= Big Band Bossa Nova (Enoch Light album) =

Studio album by Enoch Light and His Orchestra
- Released: 1962
- Genre: Bossa nova
- Label: Command

Big Band Bossa Nova is a studio album by Enoch Light and His Orchestra. It was released in 1962 on Command Records (catalog no. RS 844-SD). The musicians performing solos included Doc Severinsen on trumpet, Tony Mottola on guitar, Phil Bodner on woodwinds, and Bobby Byrne on trombone.

Big Band Bossa Nova debuted on the Billboard magazine pop album chart on December 22, 1962, peaked at No. 8, and remained on the chart for 29 weeks.

== Track listing ==
Side A

1. "Desafinado" (A.C. Jobim, N. Mendonca) [2:30]
2. "One Note Samba" (A.C. Jobim, N. Mendonca) [3:35]
3. "Perdido" (Juan Tizol) [3:14]
4. "E Luxo So" (A. Barroso, L. Peixoto) [2:53]
5. "Galanura" (E. Light, L. Davies) [2:03]
6. "Lullaby Of Birdland" (George Shearing) [3:29]

Side B

1. "Rio Junction (Bossa Nova)" (E. Light, L. Davies) [2:10]
2. "Sem Saudades De Voce" (H. Lyra) [2:34]
3. "La Puerta Del Sol" (C. Severinsen, L. Davies) [2:45]
4. "Brazil" (Ary Barroso) [2:07]
5. "Bésame Mucho" (Consuelo Velazquez) [2:46]
6. "Take The 'A' Train" (Billy Strayhorn) [2:46]

== Credits ==
- Trumpets: Doc Severinsen, Bernie Glow, Mel Davis, Jimmy Maxwell, Irvin Markowitz
- Drums: Don Lamond
- Woodwinds: Walter Lewinsky, Phil Bodner, Al Klink, Stan Webb, Hank Freeman
- Guitar: Tony Mottola
- Bass: Bob Haggart
- Trombones: Urbie Green, Bobby Byrne, Bob Alexander, Paul Faulise, Jack Satterfield
- Percussion: Bob Rosengarden, Phil Kraus, Eddie Shaughessy
