= Don Lamond =

American drummer

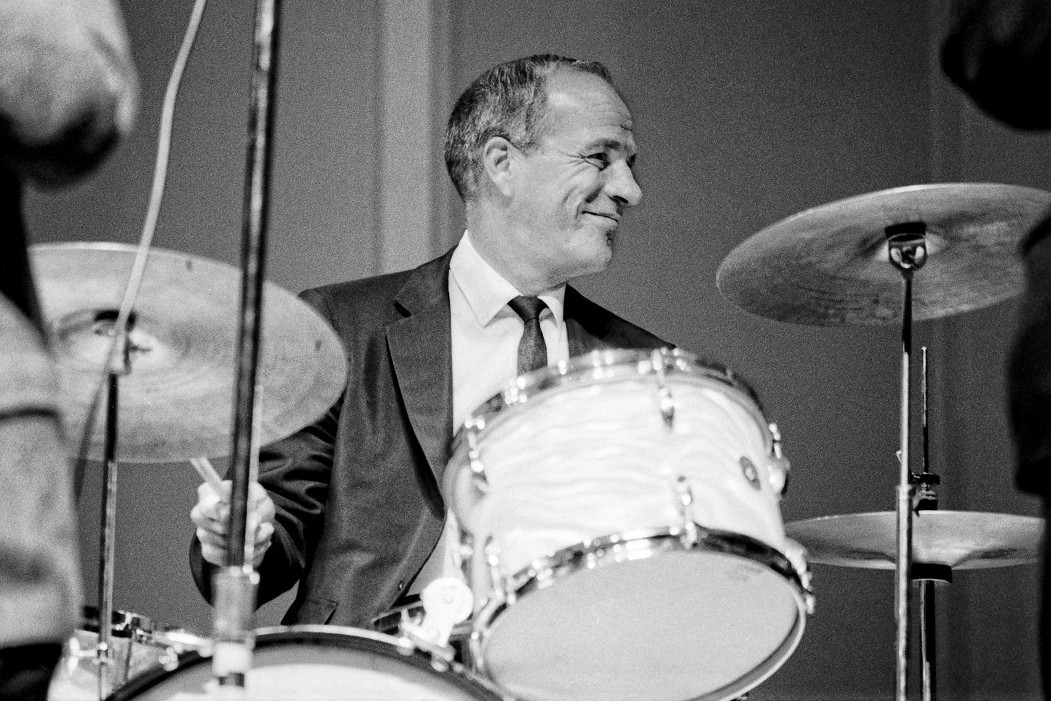
- Lamond at the 1966 Newport Jazz Festival

Background information
- Born: Donald Douglas Lamond Jr. August 18, 1920; Oklahoma City, U.S.
- Died: December 23, 2003 (aged 83) Orlando, Florida, U.S.
- Genres: Jazz, swing music, bebop, big band
- Occupation: Drummer
- Instrument: Drums
- Years active: 1940–2003

Donald Douglas Lamond Jr. (August 18, 1920 – December 23, 2003) was an American jazz drummer.

== Biography ==
Born in Oklahoma City, Lamond attended the Peabody Conservatory in Baltimore in the early 1940s, and played with Sonny Dunham and Boyd Raeburn at the outset of his career. In 1944, he performed drums on Charlie Parker’s ‘’The Complete Savoy and Dial Studio Recordings 1944-1948’’ and he took over Dave Tough's spot in Woody Herman's big band First Herd in 1945, where he remained until the group disbanded at the end of 1946. In 1947, he briefly freelanced with musicians including Charlie Parker, and then returned to duty under Herman in his Second Herd, where he remained until its 1949 dissolution. In the 1950s and 1960s Lamond found work as a session musician, recording in a wide variety of styles. He performed and recorded with Stan Getz, Zoot Sims, Johnny Smith, Benny Goodman, Ruby Braff, the Sauter-Finegan Orchestra, Sonny Stitt, Johnny Guarnieri, Jack Teagarden, Quincy Jones, George Russell, Count Basie, Lee Wiley (where he performed drums and guitar on her 1956 album West of the Moon’ and Bob Crosby among others. He recorded as a bandleader in 1962 with a tentet which included Doc Severinsen. Later in the 1960s he played with George Wein's Newport Festival band. In the 1970s, he worked with Red Norvo, Maxine Sullivan, and Bucky Pizzarelli, and also put together his own swing group late in the decade, which recorded in 1977 and 1982. He also recorded a quartet album in 1981 with his wife, Terry Lamond, singing.

He died in 2003 in Orlando, Florida, from a brain tumor, at age 83.

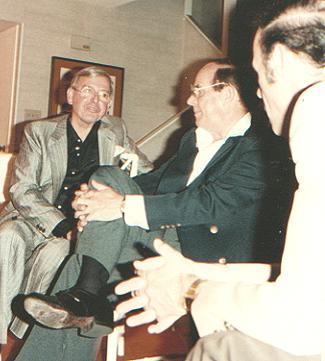
Kai Winding, Don Lamond, and Bubba Kolb at the Village Lounge, Walt Disney World

== Discography ==
According to The Jazz Discography, by Tom Lord, Lamond is listed on 549 recording sessions from 1943 to 1982.

=== As leader ===
- Off Beat (Command, 1962, RS842SD)

Full album title, Off Beat Percussion starring Don Lamond and his Orchestra

=== As sideman ===
With Manny Albam

- The Drum Suite (RCA Victor, 1956) with Ernie Wilkins

With Ruth Brown

- Late Date with Ruth Brown (Atlantic, 1959)

With Al Cohn

- The Sax Section (Epic, 1956)
- The Four Brothers... Together Again! (Vik, 1957) with Serge Chaloff, Zoot Sims and Herbie Steward
- Son of Drum Suite (RCA Victor, 1960)

With Bobby Darin

- That's All (ATCO, 1958)

With Art Farmer

- Baroque Sketches (Columbia, 1967)

With Stan Getz

- Stan Getz Quartets (Prestige, 1949-50 [1955])
- The Complete Roost Recordings (Blue Note, 1950–54 [1997])

With Harry James

- Harry James and His Orchestra 1948–49 (Big Band Landmarks Vol. X & XI, 1969)

With Hank Jones

- Gigi (Golden Crest, 1958)

With Quincy Jones

- The Birth of a Band! (Mercury, 1959)
- The Great Wide World of Quincy Jones (Mercury, 1959)

With Herbie Mann

- Love and the Weather (Bethlehem, 1956)

With Howard McGhee

- Life Is Just a Bowl of Cherries (Bethlehem, 1956)

With Carmen McRae

- Birds of a Feather (Decca, 1958)
- Something to Swing About (Kapp, 1959)

With Chico O'Farrill

- Nine Flags (Impulse!, 1966) OCLC 17472596, 763121327

With Don Elliott and Rusty Dedrick

- Counterpoint for Six Valves (Riverside, 1955–56)

With George Russell OCLC 17432429

- Jazz in the Space Age (Decca, 1960)

With Nelson Riddle

- Phil Silvers and Swinging Brass (Columbia, 1957)

With Johnny Smith

- Johnny Smith (Verve, 1967)

With Rex Stewart and Cootie Williams

- Porgy & Bess Revisited (Warner Bros., 1959)

With Joe Wilder

- The Pretty Sound (Columbia, 1959)

With Cootie Williams

- Cootie Williams in Hi-Fi (RCA Victor, 1958)

With Charlie Parker

Charlie Parker's New All Stars

Howard McGhee (trumpet), Charlie Parker (alto sax), Wardell Gray (tenor sax), Dodo Marmarosa (piano), Barney Kessel (guitar), Red Callender (bass), Don Lamond (drums)
Recorded in Hollywood, California, February 26, 1947
Originally issued by Dial
D1071-A: Relaxin' at Camarillo
D1071-B: Relaxin' at Camarillo
D1071-C: Relaxin' at Camarillo
D1071-D: Relaxin' at Camarillo
D1071-E: Relaxin' at Camarillo
D1072-A: Cheers
D1072-B: Cheers
D1072-C: Cheers
D1072-D: Cheers
D1073-A: Carvin' the Bird
D1073-B: Carvin' the Bird
D1074-A: Stupendous
D1074-B: Stupendous

Charlie Parker With Strings

Chris Griffin, Al Porcino, Bernie Privin (trumpets), Will Bradley, Bill Harris (trombones), unknown flute and oboe, Toots Mondello, Charlie Parker, Murray Williams (alto saxes), Hank Ross, Art Drellinger (tenor saxes), Stan Webb (bari sax), Lou Stein (piano), Verley Mills (harp), unknown strings, Art Ryerson (guitar), Bob Haggart (bass), Don Lamond (drums), Joe Lipman (arranger, conductor)
Recorded in New York, January 22 or 23, 1952
C675-2: Temptation
C676-3: Lover
C677-4: Autumn in New York
C678-4: Stella by starlight

Charlie Parker Quartet, Jerry Jerome Concert

Charlie Parker (alto sax), Teddy Wilson (piano), Eddie Safranski (bass), Don Lamond (drums)
Recorded in Concert at Loew's Kings Theatre, Brooklyn, March 24, 1952

1. Cool blues

Charlie Parker Big Band

Jimmy Maxwell, Carl Poole, Al Porcino, Bernie Privin (trumpets), Bill Harris, Lou McGarity, Bart Varsalona (trombones), Charlie Parker, Harry Terrill, Murray Williams (alto saxes), Flip Phillips, Hank Ross (tenor saxes), Danny Bank (bari sax), Oscar Peterson (piano), Freddie Green (guitar), Ray Brown (bass), Don Lamond (drums), Joe Lipman (arranger, conductor)
Recorded in New York, March 25, 1952
C756-5: Night and day
C757-4: Almost like being in love
C758-1: I can't get started
C759-5: What is this thing called love?

Jerry Jerome Jazz Concert, Featuring Charlie Parker

Bill Harris (trombone), Buddy DeFranco (clarinet), Charlie Parker (alto sax), Dick Cary (piano), Eddie Safranski (bass), Don Lamond (drums)
Recorded in concert at Loew's Valencia Theatre, Jamaica, New York, March 25, 1952

1. Ornithology

Charlie Parker Tentet

probably Charlie Walp (trumpet 2), Charlie Parker (alto sax), Earl Swope, Bob Swope (trombone 2), Zoot Sims (tenor sax 2), probably Bill Shanahan (piano), Charlie Byrd (guitar), Mert Oliver (bass), Don Lamond (drums) unknown (bongos)
private recording Howard Theatre, Washington, D.C., October 17, 1952

1. Scrapple from the apple
2. Out of nowhere
3. Now's the time (2)
4. 52nd Street theme (incomplete)
5. Cool blues (2)
