= Provocative Percussion Vol. III =

Studio album by Enoch Light and the Light Brigade
- Released: 1961
- Label: Command
- Producer: Enoch Light

Enoch Light and the Light Brigade chronology
Persuasive Percussion Volume 3 (1960)	Provocative Percussion Vol. III (1961)	Persuasive Percussion Volume 4 (1961)

Provocative Percussion Vol. III is a studio album by Enoch Light and the Light Brigade. It was produced by Light and released in 1961 on Light's Command Records label (catalog no. RS 821-SD). The featured musicians included Tony Mottola (guitar), Doc Severinsen (trumpet), Bobby Byrne (trombone), Urbie Green, Bob Haggart, Phil Bodner, Stanley Webb, Moe Wechsler and Joe Wilder. The arrangements were by Lew Davies. The album cover artwork is by abstract painter Josef Albers.

== Critical reception ==
Hi-Fi/Stereo Review praised the engineering and the musicians selected for the recording, but panned the percussion arrangements whose gimmicks prevented the music from "really swinging." On the other hand DownBeat cited a "minimum of drum tricks", praising the melody-centric performances and naming the track Exodus Theme as worthy of attention. Naming it a "Billboard Pick", Billboard called the album a "gas", praising the arrangements, engineering, and overall danceability. United Press International critic William D. Laffler also praised the engineering and the arrangements as "imaginative", singling out "April in Portugal" as the best song on the album.

== Track listing ==
Side A

1. "Easy to Love" (Cole Porter) - 2:25
2. "April in Portugal" (Jimmy Kennedy, Jose Galhardo, Raul Ferrão) - 2:58
3. "The Continental" (Con Conrad, Herb Magidson) - 2:57
4. "Pagan Love Song" (Arthur Freed, Nacio Herb Brown) - 3:42
5. "Ac-Cent-Tchu-Ate the Positive" (Harold Arlen, Johnny Mercer) - 3:01
6. "El Relicario" (J. Padillo) - 3:15

Side B

1. "Far Away Places" (Joan Whitney, Alex Kramer) - 4:20
2. "Let's Do It, Let's Fall in Love" (Cole Porter) - 2:16
3. "Theme from Exodus" (Ernest Gold) - 4:06
4. "Adiós Muchachos" (César Vedani, Julio César Sanders) - 3:18
5. "Provocative Percussion" (Enoch Light, L. Davies) - 2:32
6. "Old Devil Moon" (Yip Harburg, Burton Lane) - 2:57
