= Cootie Williams and His Orchestra 1941–1944 =

Compilation album by Cootie Williams
- Released: 1995
- Recorded: May 7, 1941; April 1, 1942; January 4 & 6, 1944; August 22, 1944
- Genre: Jazz
- Length: 71:24
- Label: Classics (827)

Professional ratings
Review scores
Source	Rating
Allmusic	4.5/5 stars

Cootie Williams and His Orchestra 1941–1944 is a compilation album of recordings by jazz trumpeter Cootie Williams from 1941, 1942, and 1944 (no recordings were made in 1943 due to the 1942–44 musicians' strike). It was released by Classics in 1995.

The April 1, 1942, session includes the first recording of "Epistrophy" (titled "Fly Right" here), written by Thelonious Monk, Kenny Clarke, and Cootie Williams earlier the same year. The August 22, 1944, session includes the first recording of Monk's "'Round Midnight". The January 4, 1944, session marks the recording debut of Bud Powell, then aged 20. The January 6, 1944, session features two of Pearl Bailey's earliest recordings.

== Track listing ==
All songs were written by Cootie Williams, except where noted.

1. "West End Blues" (King Oliver, Clarence Williams) – 3:08
2. "Ain't Misbehavin'" (Fats Waller, Henry Brooks, Andy Razaf) – 2:38
3. "Blues in My Condition" – 2:52
4. "G-Men" – 2:41
5. "Sleepy Valley" (unknown) – 2:54
6. "Marcheta" (Victor Schertzinger) – 3:02
7. "When My Baby Left Me" (Eddie Vinson, Williams) – 2:38
8. "Fly Right" (aka "Epistrophy") (Thelonious Monk, Kenny Clarke) – 2:30
9. "You Talk a Little Trash" – 2:59
10. "Floogie Boo" (Vinson, Williams) – 2:36
11. "I Don't Know" (Vinson, Williams) – 3:14
12. "Do Some War Work, Baby" (aka "Gotta Do Some War Work") – 3:06
13. "My Old Flame" (Arthur Johnston, Sam Coslow) – 3:16
14. "Sweet Lorraine" (Cliff Burwell, Mitchell Parish) – 3:06
15. "Echoes of Harlem" (Duke Ellington) – 3:05
16. "Honeysuckle Rose" (Waller, Razaf) – 3:06
17. "Now I Know" (Harold Arlen, Ted Koehler) – 3:02
18. "Tess's Torch Song" (aka "I Had a Man") (Arlen, Koehler) – 2:33
19. "Cherry Red Blues" (Bob Haggart) – 3:08
20. "Things Ain't What They Used to Be" (Mercer Ellington, Ted Persons) – 3:16
21. "Is You Is or Is You Ain't My Baby?" (Louis Jordan, Billy Austin) – 2:46
22. "Somebody's Gotta Go" (Haggart) – 3:19
23. "'Round Midnight" (Monk) – 3:18
24. "Blue Garden Blues" (aka "Royal Garden Blues") (Spencer Williams, Clarence Williams) – 3:13

== Personnel ==
=== Performance ===
May 7, 1941, New York. Tracks 1–4.

- Cootie Williams – trumpet
- Lou McGarity – trombone
- Les Robinson – alto sax
- Skippy Martin – baritone sax
- John Guarnieri – piano
- Artie Bernstein – bass
- Jo Jones – drums

April 1, 1942, Chicago. Tracks 5–8.

- Cootie Williams – trumpet
- Milton Fraser – trumpet
- Joe Guy – trumpet
- Louis Bacon – trumpet, vocals (track 6)
- Jonas Walker – trombone
- Robert Horton – trombone
- Sandy Williams – trombone
- Charlie Holmes – alto sax
- Eddie "Cleanhead" Vinson – alto sax, vocals (track 7)
- Bob Dorsey – tenor sax
- Greely Walton – tenor sax
- John Williams – baritone sax
- Kenny Kersey – piano
- Norman Keenan – bass
- George "Butch" Ballard – drums

January 4, 1944, New York. Tracks 9–12. January 6, 1944, New York. Tracks 13–16.

- Cootie Williams – trumpet, vocals (track 12)
- Eddie "Cleanhead" Vinson – alto sax
- Eddie "Jockjaw" Davis – tenor sax
- Bud Powell – piano
- Norman Keenan – bass
- Sylvester "Vess" Payne – drums

January 6, 1944, New York. Tracks 17–20.

- Pearl Bailey – vocals (tracks 17–18)
- Cootie Williams – trumpet
- Ermit V. Perry – trumpet
- George Treadwell – trumpet
- Harold "Money" Johnson – trumpet
- Ed Burke – trombone
- George Stevenson – trombone
- Robert Horton – trombone
- Eddie "Cleanhead" Vinson – alto sax, vocals (tracks 19–20)
- Charlie Holmes – alto sax
- Eddie "Jockjaw" Davis – tenor sax
- Lee Pope – tenor sax
- Eddie de Verteuil – baritone sax
- Bud Powell – piano
- Norman Keenan – bass
- Sylvester "Vess" Payne – drums

August 22, 1944, New York. Tracks 21–24.

- Cootie Williams – trumpet
- Ermit V. Perry – trumpet
- George Treadwell – trumpet
- Lammar Wright – trumpet
- Tommy Stevenson – trumpet
- Ed Burke – trombone
- Ed Glover – trombone
- Robert Horton – trombone
- Eddie "Cleanhead" Vinson – alto sax, vocals (tracks 21–22)
- Frank Powell – alto sax
- Sam "The Man" Taylor – tenor sax
- Lee Pope – tenor sax
- Eddie de Verteuil – baritone sax
- Bud Powell – piano
- Leroy Kirkland – guitar
- Carl Pruitt – bass
- Sylvester "Vess" Payne – drums

=== Production ===
- Anatol Schenker – liner notes
