= Persuasive Percussion Volume 3 =

Studio album by The Command All Stars
- Released: 1960
- Label: Command
- Producer: Enoch Light

The Command All Stars chronology
Provocative Percussion Volume 2 (1960)	Persuasive Percussion Volume 3 (1960)	Provocative Percussion Vol. III (1961)

Persuasive Percussion Volume 3 is a studio album by The Command All Stars. It was produced by Enoch Light and released in 1960 on Light's Command Records label (catalog no. RS 817-SD). The featured musicians included Tony Mottola (guitar), Doc Severinsen (trumpet), Bobby Byrne (trombone), Bobby Haggart, Phil Bodner (piccolo), and Stan Webb (saxophone). The album cover artwork is by abstract painter Josef Albers.

Persuasive Percussion Volume 3 debuted on the Billboard magazine pop album chart on May 1, 1961, peaked at the No. 3 spot, and remained on the chart for 51 weeks.

AllMusic gave the album a rating of two-and-a-half stars. Reviewer Dave Nathan wrote: "This is one in a series of LP's that Command records issued to show off its considerable recording skills rather than for any lasting musical value."

== Track listing ==
Side A

1. "Moments To Remember" (A. Stillman, R. Allen) [3:18]
2. "All The Way" (S. Cahn, J. Van Heusen) [2:38]
3. "Theme From Polovetzian Dances" (A. Borodin) [4:10]
4. "Perdido" (E. Drake, H. Lengsfelder, J. Tizol) [2:39]
5. "Come Rain Or Come Shine" (H. Arlen, J. Mercer) [3:17]
6. "Hawaiian War Chant" (J. Noble, Leleiohaku) [2:23]

Side B

1. "One For My Baby" (H. Arlen, J. Mercer) [3:03]
2. "Kashmiri Song" (A. Wood, Forde, Finden) [3:35]
3. "When Your Lover Has Gone" (E. A. Swan) [3:12]
4. "Bingo Bango Bongo Baby" (E. Light, L. Davies) [3:04]
5. "Autumn In New York" (V. Duke) [3:00]
6. "Don't Worry About Me" (R. Bloom, T. Koehler) [2:50]
