= Persuasive Percussion Volume 2 =

Studio album by Terry Snyder and The All Stars
- Released: 1959
- Label: Command
- Producer: Enoch Light

Terry Snyder and The All Stars chronology
Provocative Percussion (1959)	Persuasive Percussion Volume 2 (1959)	Provocative Percussion Volume 2 (1960)

Persuasive Percussion Volume 2 is a studio album by Terry Snyder and The All Stars. It was produced by Enoch Light and released in 1959 on Light's Command Records label (catalog no. RS 810-SD). The featured musicians included Tony Mottola, Willie Rodriguez, Dick Hyman, Jack Lesberg, Teddy Sommer, Artie Marotti, Stanley Webb, and Dominic Cortese.

Persuasive Percussion Volume 2 debuted on the Billboard magazine pop album chart on August 22, 1960, peaked at the No. 3 spot, and remained on the chart for 36 weeks.

AllMusic gave the album a rating of four stars. Reviewer Tony Wilds wrote: 'Rocka Bongo Boogie' is inspired; the rest is only a shade above standard Command from the period."

== Track listing ==
Side A

1. "Blue Is The Night" (Fred Fisher) [3:00]
2. "Blue Tango" (L. Anderson, M. Parish) [2:56]
3. "Miami Beach Rhumba" (A. Gamse, I. Fields) [3:02]
4. "Yours Is My Heart Alone" (F. Lehar, B. Loehner, H. Smith, L. Herzer) [2:08]
5. "In A Persian Market" (A. W. Ketelbey) [2:47]
6. "Mambo Jambo" (C. Towne, P. Prado, R. Karl) [2:14]

Side B

1. "Dearly Beloved" (J. Kern, J. Mercer) [3:03]
2. "Lu Cucaracha" [2:29]
3. "Rock-a Bongo Boogie" (E. Light, L. Davies) [2:20]
4. "Lady Of Spain" (E. Reaves, T. Evans) [2:30]
5. "Out Of Nowhere" (E. Heyman, J. W. Green) [1:58]
6. "Brazil" (A. Barroso, S. K. Russell) [2:56]
