= Great Themes from Hit Films =

Studio album by Enoch Light
- Released: 1962
- Label: Command
- Producer: Enoch Light

Great Themes from Hit Films is a studio album by Enoch Light and His Orchestra, released in 1962 on Light's Command Records label (catalog no. RS 33-835). The album was third in Light's series of albums recorded on 35 millimeter magnetic film.

Great Themes from Hit Films debuted on the Billboard magazine pop album chart on April 21, 1962, peaked at the No. 27 spot, and remained on the chart for 12 weeks.

AllMusic gave the album a rating of two-and-a-half stars. Reviewer Ted Mills wrote: "There's nothing too daring here, and any technical advances in sound are unfortunately undercut by the probable condition of the used vinyl copy you might encounter."

== Track listing ==
Side A

1. "La Dolce Vita"
2. "Moon River (From Breakfast at Tiffany's)"
3. "Light in the Piazza"
4. "Love Theme from 'El Cid'"
5. "Tender Is the Night"
6. "Never on Sunday"

Side B

1. "Tonight (From 'West Side Story')"
2. "Exodus"
3. "Theme from 'The Hustler'"
4. "Theme from 'Four Horsemen of the Apocalypse'"
5. "Theme from 'King of Kings'"
6. "Satan Never Sleeps"
