= Boomie Richman =

American jazz musician (1921–2016

Abraham Samuel Richman (April 2, 1921 – March 22, 2016), better known as Boomie Richman, was an American jazz tenor saxophone player who played with Tommy Dorsey. He also played clarinet, bass clarinet, piccolo, and flute.

Richman was born in Brockton, Massachusetts on April 2, 1921. Before joining the Dorsey band, he worked with George Paxton and Muggsy Spanier. From 1945 to 1951, he recorded with Dorsey and was a soloist in the band. During the 1950s he worked intermittently with the Benny Goodman Orchestra and with Red Allen, Ruby Braff, Al Cohn, Cootie Williams, and the Sauter-Finegan Orchestra. He also worked as a studio musician.

Richman recorded with Buddy Holly on October 21, 1958, playing the sax solo on "True Love Ways". He also played with Judy Garland in her comeback performance at Carnegie Hall. On television, he appeared on The Jimmy Dean Show, The Perry Como Show, The Dick Cavett Show, The Patti Page Show, The Pat Boone Show, and The Andy Williams Show.

Richman died in Boynton Beach, Florida on March 22, 2016, at the age of 94.

== Discography ==
=== As sideman ===
- Steve Allen, Steve Allen Plays Neal Hefti (Coral, 1958)
- Teresa Brewer, Teresa Brewer and the Dixieland Band (Coral, 1959)
- Bobby Byrne, The Jazzbone's Connected to the Trombone (Grand Award, 1959)
- Al Cohn, The Sax Section (Epic, 1956)
- Cab Calloway, Hi De Hi De Ho (RCA Victor, 1960)
- Perry Como, We Get Letters (RCA Victor, 1957)
- Jackie Cooper, The Movies Swing! (Dot, 1958)
- Rusty Dedrick, A Jazz Journey (Monmouth, 1965)
- Marty Gold, Suddenly It's Springtime (RCA Victor, 1964)
- Benny Goodman, Fletcher Henderson Arrangements (Columbia, 1953)
- Benny Goodman, B.G. in Hi-Fi (Capitol, 1955)
- Neal Hefti, Singing Instrumentals (Epic, 1954)
- Hugo & Luigi, The Cascading Voices of the Hugo & Luigi Chorus (RCA Victor, 1963)
- Henry Jerome, Brazen Brass Features...Saxes (Decca, 1961)
- Enoch Light, The Big Band Sound of the Thirties (Project 3, 1970)
- George Paxton, The Uncollected George Paxton and His Orchestra 1944–1945 (Hindsight, 1982)
- Joe Reisman, Party Night at Joe's (RCA Victor, 1958)\
- Richard Maltby, Many Sided Maltby (Sesac, 1958)
- Tommy Reynolds, Jazz for Happy Feet (King, 1956)
- Edgar Sampson, Swing Softly Sweet Sampson (Coral, 1957)
- Sauter-Finegan Orchestra, Directions in Music (Bluebird, 1988)
- Hymie Shertzer, All the King's Saxes (Disneyland, 1958)
- Phil Silvers, Phil Silvers and Swinging Brass (Columbia, 1957)
- Cootie Williams, Cootie Williams in Hi-Fi (RCA Victor, 1958)
- Cootie Williams, Porgy & Bess Revisited (Warner Bros., 1959)
