= Provocative Percussion =

Studio album by Enoch Light and The Light Brigade
- Released: 1959
- Label: Command
- Producer: Enoch Light

Enoch Light and The Light Brigade chronology
Persuasive Percussion (1959)	Provocative Percussion (1959)	Persuasive Percussion Volume 2 (1959)

Provocative Percussion is a studio album by Enoch Light and The Light Brigade, also known as the Command All-Stars. It was released in 1959 on Command Records (catalog no. RS 806-SD). The album cover artwork is by abstract painter Josef Albers, like its predecessor.

Provocative Percussion debuted on the Billboard magazine pop album chart on January 25, 1960, held the No. 2 spot for five weeks, and remained on the chart for 69 weeks.

AllMusic gave the album a rating of five stars. Reviewer Lindsay Planer called it "a highly recommended kitsch-classic."

== Track listing ==
Side A

1. "You're the Top" (Cole Porter) [2:34]
2. "Somebody Loves Me" (Gershwin, DeSylva, MacDonald) [2:42]
3. "Blues in the Night" (Arlen, Mercer) [4:12]
4. "Perhaps, Perhaps, Perhaps" (Farres) [2:35]
5. "Love for Sale" (Cole Porter) [2:50]
6. "Fascinating Rhythm" (Gershwin) [2:35]

Side B

1. "S'Wonderful" (Gershwin) [2:18]
2. "Mood Indigo" (Ellington, Mills, Bigard) [2:51]
3. "Ain't Misbehavin'" (Razaf, Brook, Waller) [3:19]
4. "The Man I Love" (Gershwin) [2:35]
5. "Song of India" (N. Rimsky-Korsakoff) [3:12]
6. "Mad About the Boy" (Coward) [2:48]

== Credits ==
- Bobby Byrne
- Charles Magnante
- Bob Haggart
- Tony Mottola
- Willie Rodriguez
- Moe Wechsler
- Urbie Green
- Terry Snyder
- Pee Wee Erwin
- Artie Marotti
- Dominic Cortese
- Ezelle Watson
- Russ Banzer
- Stanley Webb
- Milt Yaner
- Leonard Calderon
- George Dessinger
- Bernie Kaufman
