= Persuasive Percussion =

Studio album by Enoch Light and His Orchestra
- Released: 1959
- Label: Command
- Producer: Enoch Light

Enoch Light and His Orchestra chronology
Persuasive Percussion (1959)	Provocative Percussion (1960)

Persuasive Percussion is an LP album performed by Terry Snyder and the All Stars and released in 1959 by Command Records (run by Enoch Light). The packaging includes the first use of the gatefold cover which, upon being unfolded, lists information about each selection. The liner notes state that the album may be used to test audio equipment, due to the stereo placement of sounds independently in either the left or right channel (something common today, but extremely innovative in 1959). The album cover artwork, by Josef Albers, is minimalistic in style, consisting of an arrangement of dots. The album was the first volume in a series of Persuasive Percussion releases. Provocative Percussion was the second release of the Percussion albums. Both Persuasive Percussion and Provocative Percussion had four volumes released over the next several years.

In April 1960, the album reached number 1 on The Billboard's Stereo Action Albums chart, and stayed at the top for 13 weeks. It spent a total of 124 weeks on the top selling albums charts.

In 1965 Cash Box magazine stated, "Persuasive Percussion Vol. 1 was perhaps the LP that put the stereo disk on the map. Much like Milton Berle, whose antics in the early days of TV was credited with selling millions of sets, this album undoubtedly brought to light the startling musical aspects of stereo sound on records".

== Track listing ==
1. "I'm in the Mood for Love"
2. "Whatever Lola Wants"
3. "Misirlou"
4. "I Surrender Dear"
5. "Orchids in the Moonlight"
6. "I Love Paris"
7. "My Heart Belongs to Daddy"
8. "Tabú"
9. "Breeze and I"
10. "Aloha Oe"
11. "The Japanese Sandman"
12. "Love Is a Many Splendored Thing"

== Credits ==
- The Command All-Stars Primary Artist
- Dominic Cortese Accordion
- Dick Hyman Organ, Piano
- Jack Lesberg Bass
- Enoch Light Primary Artist
- Art Marotti Percussion
- Tony Mottola Guitar
- Cole Porter Composer
- Willie Rodriguez Bongos, Percussion
- Terry Snyder Drums
- Teddy Sommer Drums
- Stanley Webb Woodwind
- Enoch Light, Producer
- Julie Klages, Associate Producer
- C. Robert Fine, Recording Engineer
- George Piros, Disc Mastering Engineer
