= William Peeples =

American jazz musician

William T. Peeples (died 10 March 2004) was an American jazz drummer.

After studying bebop drumming with Ed Blackwell and "Philly" Joe Jones, he served in Korea before joining Ray Charles’ band in the mid-1950s, appearing on “I Got a Woman”, Charles’ first No. 1 R&B hit in 1954.

Tired of touring, in 1960 he retired to South Florida, playing locally with singer Alice Day, and Ira Sullivan and Pete Minger, among other musicians.

He was posthumously inducted into the South Florida Jazz Hall of Fame in 2012.

== Discography ==
As sideman

- 1957: The Great Ray Charles - Ray Charles
- 1958: Yes Indeed! - Ray Charles
- 1962: The Solid Trumpet of Cootie Williams - Cootie Williams
- 1991: In Pursuit of a Melody - Joan Cartwright with Dr. Lonnie Smith
