= The Big Challenge =

Studio album by Cootie & Rex
- Released: 1957
- Recorded: April 30 and May 7, 1957
- Studio: Webster Hall, New York City
- Genre: Jazz
- Length: 37:23
- Label: Jazztone; J 1268
- Producer: George T. Simon

Rex Stewart chronology
Dixieland Free-for-All (1956)	The Big Challenge (1957)	Rendezvous with Rex (1958)

Cootie Williams chronology
The Big Challenge (1957)	Cootie Williams in Hi-Fi (1958)

The Big Challenge is an album by trumpeter Cootie Williams and cornetist Rex Stewart, recorded in 1957 and released on the Jazztone label.

== Reception ==
Professional ratings
Review scores
Source	Rating
AllMusic	4.5/5 stars

Scott Yanow of AllMusic states, "a fun and unusual Jazztone session. Six distinctive and very different veterans were teamed together ... the unique matchups are very successful. Each of the musicians has an opportunity to be featured and the tradeoffs are quite memorable. A colorful gem.".

== Track listing ==
1. "I'm Beginning to See the Light" (Duke Ellington, Don George, Johnny Hodges, Harry James) – 6:06
2. "Do Nothing Till You Hear from Me" (Ellington, Bob Russell) – 4:07
3. "Alphonse and Gaston" (Ernie Wilkins) – 8:29
4. "I Got a Right to Sing the Blues" (Harold Arlen, Ted Koehler) – 4:09
5. "Walkin' My Baby Back Home" (Fred E. Ahlert, Roy Turk) – 4:42
6. "When Your Lover Has Gone" (Einar Aaron Swan) – 5:08
7. "I Knew You When" (Rex Stewart) – 4:42
- Recorded at Webster Hall in NYC on April 30 (tracks 1–3) and May 6 (tracks 4–7), 1957

== Personnel ==
- Cootie Williams – trumpet
- Rex Stewart – cornet
- Lawrence Brown, J. C. Higginbotham – trombone
- Bud Freeman, Coleman Hawkins – tenor saxophone
- Billy Bauer – guitar
- Hank Jones – piano
- Milt Hinton – double bass
- Gus Johnson – drums
- Ernie Wilkins – arranger
