= I Want to Be Happy Cha Cha's =

Studio album by Enoch Light and The Light Brigade
- Released: 1959
- Label: Grand Award

I Want to Be Happy Cha Cha's is a studio album of cha-cha-chá music by Enoch Light and The Light Brigade. It was released in 1959 on the Grand Award label (catalog no. G.A. 33-388).

Following its release, Billboard magazine gave the album a rating of four stars and wrote: "Enoch Light has rounded up a great set of cha-cha arrangements . . . gathering a swinging group of ace sidemen, and added a stereo engineering job in the two-track version that will make woofer-and-tweeter addicts go misty-eyed." It was also included in Billboard's "Album Spotlight Winners of the Month". It debuted on the pop album chart on June 15, 1959, peaked at the No. 38 spot, and remained on the chart for two weeks.

AllMusic later gave the album a rating of two stars."

== Track listing ==
Side A

1. "I Want To Be Happy Cha Cha" (Caesar, Youmans) [2:27]
2. "Tremendo Cha Cha" (Blanco, Loco) [3:14]
3. "Tea for Two Cha Cha" (Caesar, Youmans) [2:47]
4. "Lover" (Rodgers, Hart) [2:40]
5. "Yes Sir, That's My Baby" (Kahn, Donaldson) [2:24]
6. "The Sheikh" (Wheeler, Smith, Snyder) [2:20]

Side B

1. "Chiquita Cha Cha" (Light, Davies) [2:36]
2. "Sweet and Gentle" (Portal) [2:59]
3. "Cara Mia Cha Cha (Ciribiribin)" (Light, Davies) [2:19]
4. "How High the Moon" (Lewis) [2:19]
5. "Patricia" (Prado) [2:30]
6. "Guaglione" (Franciulli, Nisa) [2:17]
