= Trappier =

Trappier is a surname. Notable people with the surname include:

- Arthur Trappier (1910–1975), American jazz drummer
- Éric Trappier (born 1960), French businessman
