= Persuasive Percussion Volume 4 =

Studio album by Enoch Light and The Command All Stars
- Released: 1961
- Label: Command
- Producer: Enoch Light

Enoch Light and The Command All Stars chronology
Provocative Percussion Vol. III (1961)	Persuasive Percussion Volume 4 (1961)	Provocative Percussion Volume 4 (1962)

Persuasive Percussion Volume 4 is a studio album by Enoch Light and The Command All Stars. It was produced by Enoch Light and released in 1961 on Light's Command Records label (catalog no. RS 830-SD).

Persuasive Percussion Volume 4 debuted on the Billboard magazine pop album chart on March 3, 1962, peaked at the No. 34 spot, and remained on the chart for five weeks.

AllMusic gave the album a rating of four-and-a-half stars.

== Track listing ==
Side A

1. "Oh Lady Be Good" [3:03]
2. "I May Be Wrong" [2:27]
3. "It's De Lovely" [2:13]
4. "Hello Young Lovers" [4:13]
5. "Am I Blue" [2:56]
6. "Besame Mucho" [3:22]

Side B

1. "Hold Me" [2:02]
2. "You Brought A New Kind Of Love To Me" [3:35]
3. "In The Mood" [2:27]
4. "Got A Date With An Angel" [3:08]
5. "Can't Get Enough For My Baby" [2:40]
6. "My Blue Heaven" [2:50]
