= Porgy & Bess Revisited =

Studio album by Stewart–Williams & Co.
- Released: 1959
- Recorded: Late 1958
- Studios: Webster Hall, New York City
- Genre: Jazz
- Length: 37:21
- Labels: Warner Bros. W/WS 1260
- Producer: George T. Simon

Rex Stewart chronology
Henderson Homecoming (1959)	Porgy & Bess Revisited (1959)	Chatter Jazz (1959)

Cootie Williams chronology
Cootie Williams in Hi-Fi (1958)	Porgy & Bess Revisited (1959)	The Solid Trumpet of Cootie Williams (1962)

Porgy & Bess Revisited (subtitled Played by a Very Unusual Cast) is a studio album of jazz interpretations of songs from the George Gershwin opera Porgy and Bess, performed by cornetist Rex Stewart and trumpeter Cootie Williams, with saxophonists Hilton Jefferson and Pinky Williams and trombonist Lawrence Brown, which was recorded in late 1958 and released on the Warner Bros. label.

== Reception ==
Professional ratings
Review scores
Source	Rating
AllMusic	4/5 stars

Scott Yanow of AllMusic stated, "The two lead characters are played instrumentally by swing all-stars. Cornetist Rex Stewart portrays Sportin' Life, trumpeter Cootie Williams (who emerges as the main star) is Porgy, altoist Hilton Jefferson is Bess and trombonist Lawrence Brown is both Serena and Clara. Somehow it all works. Jim Timmens' arrangements for the big band keeps the momentum going, making this a surprisingly successful effort".

== Track listing ==
All tracks are written by George Gershwin.

No.	Title	Length
1.	"It Ain't Necessarily So"	3:58
2.	"Bess, You Is My Woman"	4:33
3.	"I Got Plenty o' Nuttin' "	2:23
4.	"My Man's Gone Now"	3:09
5.	"There's a Boat Dat's Leavin' Soon for New York"	3:24
6.	"Summertime"	4:05
7.	"A Red-Headed Woman"	3:03
8.	"Oh Bess, Oh Where's My Bess"	3:27
9.	"A Woman Is a Sometime Thing"	3:49
10.	"Oh Lawd, I'm on My Way"	3:58
Total length:		37:21

== Personnel ==
- Rex Stewart – cornet, trumpet (soloist: tracks 1 & 5)
- Cootie Williams – trumpet (soloist: tracks 2, 3, 7, 8 & 10)
- Hilton Jefferson – alto saxophone (soloist: track 2)
- Pinky Williams – baritone saxophone (soloist: track 9)
- Lawrence Brown – trombone (soloist: tracks 4 & 6)
- Al DeRisi, Bernie Glow, Ernie Royal, Joe Wilder – trumpet
- Eddie Bert, Urbie Green, Sonny Russo – trombone
- Abraham "Boomie" Richman, Al Klink – tenor saxophone
- Sid Cooper, Walt Levinsky – alto saxophone
- Buddy Weed – piano
- Barry Galbraith – guitar
- Milt Hinton – double bass
- Don Lamond – drums
- Joe Venuto – percussion
- Jim Timmens – conductor, arranger
- Unidentified musicians – French horn, wind instruments, string section
