= Big Band Bossa Nova =

Big Band Bossa Nova may refer to:

- Big Band Bossa Nova (Quincy Jones album), 1962
- Big Band Bossa Nova (Stan Getz album), 1962
- Big Band Bossa Nova (Enoch Light album), 1962
