= When Your Lover Has Gone =

Song
- Published: 1931
- Genre: Jazz
- Songwriter: Einar Aaron Swan

"When Your Lover Has Gone" is a 1931 composition by Einar Aaron Swan which, after being featured in the James Cagney film Blonde Crazy that same year, has become a jazz standard.

== Recordings ==
Year	Artist	Album
1931	Gene Austin	Recorded February 5, 1931, for Victor Records, catalog No. 22635. Very popular in 1931.
1931	Louis Armstrong & His Orchestra	Recorded on April 28, 1931. Label: OKeh – 41498.
1931	Ethel Waters	Recorded February 10, 1931, for Columbia Records, catalog 2409D. Ethel Waters' Greatest Years (Columbia, 1972); part of the John Hammond Collection
1931	Benny Goodman & His Orchestra	Recorded February 5, 1931, for Melotone Records, catalog No.12120.
1942	Maxine Sullivan with Charlie Shavers and His Orchestra	Recorded January 28, 1942, for Decca Records, catalog. No. 18555A. 7-inch LP, Jazztone (J-737)
1944	Eddie Condon All Stars with Lee Wiley	Recorded December 13, 1944, for Decca Records, catalog No. 23393A. Eddie Condon All Stars 1945
1944	Harry James & His Orchestra	Recorded November 24, 1944, for Columbia Records, catalog No. 36773.
1945	Irving Fazola's Dixielanders	Keynote recording, New Orleans Express (1955)
1947	Wild Bill Davison	Sweet and Hot
1949	Doris Day	You're My Thrill
1952	George Wallington Trio	Recorded September 4, 1952.
1953	Buddy DeFranco	Jazz Tones
1953	Roy Eldridge with the Oscar Peterson Trio	Dale's Wail
1955	Claire Austin	Claire Austin Sings "When Your Lover Has Gone"
1955	Earl Bostic and His Orchestra	Alto-tude
1955	Don Elliott and Rusty Dedrick	Counterpoint for Six Valves (a.k.a. Double Trumpet Doings)
1955	Urbie Green	The Lyrical Language of Urbie Green (1978).
1955	Johnny Hartman	Songs from the Heart
1955	Billie Holiday and Her Orchestra	Velvet Mood
1955	Frank Sinatra	In the Wee Small Hours
1955	Art Tatum (piano solo)	The Incomparable Art Tatum (piano solo)
1956	Art Farmer	2 Trumpets (with Donald Byrd, Jackie McLean)
1956	Herb Jeffries	Say It Isn't So
1956	Chico Hamilton Quintet	Chico Hamilton Quintet in Hi Fi
1956	Morgana King	Morgana King Sings the Blues (1958).
1956	Julie London	Lonely Girl
1956	Sonny Rollins	Tenor Madness
1957	Louis Armstrong	I've Got the World on a String
1957	Nat King Cole	Just One of Those Things
1957	Jazz Giants '58: Harry Edison, Stan Getz, Gerry Mulligan, Louis Bellson and the O. Peterson Trio	Jazz Giants '58 (Verve)
1957	Gerry Mulligan Quartet with Chet Baker	Reunion with Chet Baker
1957	Keely Smith	I Wish You Love
1957	Julie Wilson	My Old Flame
1958	Billie Holiday	Broadcast Performances, Vol. 3: 1956-1958 (also rel. on DVD); May 29 and July 17 on TV at Art Ford's Jazz Party
1958	Billie Holiday with Duke Ellington and His Orchestra	Sept. 29, live at the Persian Room, Plaza Hotel, New York City
1958	Billie Holiday	At Monterey / 1958 (1986) Live at the Monterey Jazz Festival, Oct. 5
1958	Sue Raney	When Your Lover Has Gone
1959	The Four Freshmen	Love Lost
1959	Ray Charles	The Genius of Ray Charles
1959	Eddie "Lockjaw" Davis & Shirley Scott	Bacalao
1959	Herb Ellis with Jimmy Giuffre	Herb Ellis Meets Jimmy Giuffre
1959	Red Garland Trio with Eddie "Lockjaw" Davis	Moodsville Volume 1
1959	Lee Konitz with Jimmy Giuffre	Lee Konitz Meets Jimmy Giuffre
1959	Carmen McRae	When You're Away
1959	Ben Webster with the Oscar Peterson Trio	Ben Webster Meets Oscar Peterson
1959	Mary Osborne	A Girl and Her Guitar
1959	Andy Williams	Lonely Street
1960	Art Blakey and the Jazz Messengers	A Night in Tunisia (first release on reissue in 1989)
1960	Ricky Nelson	More Songs by Ricky
1960	Jimmy Forrest	Forrest Fire
1960	Red Garland	Red Alone
1960	Anthony Newley	Love Is a Now and Then Thing
1961	Sarah Vaughan	The Divine One
1961	Stan Kenton	The Romantic Approach
1961	Dinah Washington with Quincy Jones and His Orchestra	I Wanna Be Loved
1962	Ella Fitzgerald with Nelson Riddle	Ella Swings Brightly with Nelson
1963	Vic Damone	The Liveliest at the Basin Street East
1963	Kate Smith	Kate Smith at Carnegie Hall
1964	Marvin Gaye	When I'm Alone I Cry
1964	Brenda Lee	..."Let Me Sing"
1965	Chet Baker	Baker's Holiday (Chet Baker Sings and Plays Billie Holiday)
1968	Kenny Clarke/Francy Boland Big Band	All Smiles (a.k.a. Let's Face the Music)
1975	Ella Fitzgerald with Oscar Peterson	Ella and Oscar
1975	Joe Pass	Virtuoso in New York (2004)
1978	Diahann Carroll with the Duke Ellington Orchestra under the direction of Mercer Ellington	A Tribute to Ethel Waters
1978	Sarah Vaughan	How Long Has This Been Going On?
1979	Art Van Damme Quintet	Blue World
1981	Sarah Vaughan and the Count Basie Orchestra	Send in the Clowns
1984	Linda Ronstadt with Nelson Riddle	Lush Life
1989	Ella Fitzgerald	All That Jazz; Grammy Award for Best Jazz Vocal Performance, Female 1991
1989	Mina	Uiallalla
1990	Carly Simon	My Romance
1991	Melora Hardin	The Rocketeer (film) soundtrack
1991	Dorothy Loudon	Saloon
1992	Joe Pass	Meditation (2002)
1997	Carmen Lundy	Old Devil Moon
1997	Johnny Holiday	Johnny Holiday Sings
2000	June Christy with the Johnny Guarnieri Quintet	A Friendly Session, Vol. 3
2001	Stacey Kent	Dreamsville
2002	Derek Bailey	Ballads
2004	Kevin Spacey with John Wilson & The Orchestra	Beyond the Sea O.S.T.

== See also ==
- List of 1930s jazz standards
