= Birdwatching (disambiguation) =

Birdwatching is a recreational activity involving the observation of birds.

Birdwatching or Birdwatcher may also refer to:

- Bird Watching (magazine), a British magazine established in 1986
- Birdwatch (magazine), a British magazine established in 1992
- Bird Watching (album), a 1961 album by Don Elliott
- BirdWatchers, a 2008 film by Marco Bechis
- The Birdwatchers, a garage rock pop band from the 1960s
- The Birdwatcher, a 1988 Estonian film by Arvo Iho

== See also ==
- Birdwatch (disambiguation)
