= Provocative Percussion Volume 2 =

Studio album by Enoch Light and The Light Brigade
- Released: 1960
- Label: Command

Enoch Light and The Light Brigade chronology
Persuasive Percussion Volume 2 (1959)	Provocative Percussion Volume 2 (1960)	Persuasive Percussion Volume 3 (1960)

Provocative Percussion Volume 2 is a studio album by Enoch Light and The Light Brigade. It was released in 1960 on Command Records (catalog no. RS 810-SD). The album cover artwork is by abstract painter Josef Albers.

Provocative Percussion debuted on the Billboard magazine pop album chart on September 19, 1960, peaked at the No. 4 spot, and remained on the chart for 31 weeks.

AllMusic gave the album a rating of three stars. Reviewer Eugene Chadbourne called Light "a heavyweight when it comes to big-band charts."

== Track listing ==
Side A

1. "Hernando's Hideaway" (J. Ross, R. Adler) [3:05]
2. "Speak To Me Of Love - Cha Cha" (B. Sievier, J. Lenoir) [2:50]
3. "Matilda" (N. Span) [2:41]
4. "Good Night Sweetheart - Cha Cha" (J. Campbell, R. Noble, R. Connolly, R. Vallee) [2:41]
5. "What Is This Thing Called Love" (Cole Porter) [2:42]
6. "Lady Is A Tramp" (R. Rodgers, L. Hart) [3:24]

Side B

1. "Speak Low" (K. Weill, O. Nash) [2:51]
2. "I've Got The Right To Sing The Blues" (H. Arlen, T. Koehler) [2:54]
3. "Mack The Knife" (K. Weill, M. Blitzstein) [3:20]
4. "Temptation" (A. Freed, Nacio Herb Brown) [2:42]
5. "The Natives Are Restless Tonight" (E. Light, L. Davies) [2:43]
6. "Foggy Day Cha Cha" (Geore & Ira Gershwin) [2:56]
