= Bill Pemberton =

American jazz musician

William McLane, better known as Bill Pemberton (March 5, 1918 in New York City – December 13, 1984 in New York City) was an American jazz double-bassist.

Pemberton played violin as a child before switching to bass. He was in Frankie Newton's orchestra from 1941 to 1945 and then worked with Herman "Ivory" Chittison, Mercer Ellington, Eddie Barefield, and Billy Kyle later in the 1940s. In the 1950s he worked with Art Tatum and Rex Stewart, and from 1966 to 1969 was Earl Hines's bassist, including for international tours and at the 1967 Newport Jazz Festival and Monterey Jazz Festival. He also worked with Buck Clayton in 1967. In 1969 he joined the JPJ Quartet alongside Budd Johnson, Oliver Jackson, and Dill Jones, and remained with the group until 1975; concomitantly he played with Ruby Braff, Max Kaminsky, and Vic Dickenson. He rejoined Hines in 1977, playing in Europe with him and Benny Carter. Late in his career he played with Panama Francis, Bill Coleman, and Doc Cheatham.

== Discography ==
With Rex Stewart

- Henderson Homecoming (United Artists, 1959)
