= Bird Watching (album) =

Studio album by The Nutty Squirrels
- Released: 1961
- Recorded: 26 July 1960
- Genre: Children's jazz
- Length: 31:07
- Label: Columbia
- Producer: Don Elliott and Granville Alexander "Sascha" Burland

The Nutty Squirrels chronology
The Nutty Squirrels (1959)	''Bird Watching'' (1961)	Sing a Hard Day's Night and Other Smashes (1964)

Bird Watching is a novelty jazz album by Don Elliott and Granville Alexander "Sascha" Burland, recording as The Nutty Squirrels.

Note: For stereo listeners, Sascha is the voice on the left speaker, Don on the right.

— from the album notes

Cannonball Adderley plays alto sax on the song "Yardbird Suite".

== Track listing ==
=== Side one ===
1. "Bird Watching" (Sascha Burland) – 2:41
2. "Flamingo" (Edmund Anderson, Ted Grouya) – 2:22
3. "Cool Canary" (Ray Gilbert, Paul Nero) – 2:34
4. "Sparrow in the Treetop" – (Bob Merrill) 2:09
5. "When the Red, Red Robin (Comes Bob, Bob, Bobbin' Along)" (Harry Woods) – 2:10
6. "Yardbird Suite" (Charlie Parker) – 3:05

=== Side two ===
1. "Didee Bird" (Don Elliott) – 2:39
2. "Skylark" (Johnny Mercer, Hoagy Carmichael) – 2:02
3. "Bye Bye Blackbird" (Mort Dixon, Ray Henderson) – 3:11
4. "Blue Feather" (Sascha Burland) – 2:53
5. "Bob White" (Johnny Mercer, Bernie Hanighen) – 2:13
6. "That's Owl, Brother" (Don Elliott) – 2:18

== Personnel ==
- Don Elliott, Granville Alexander "Sascha" Burland - vocalist
- Hal McKusick - alto saxophone
- Cannonball Adderley - alto saxophone on "Yardbird Suite"
- Bobby Jaspar - flute
- Sam Most - flute, tenor saxophone
- Romeo Penque - flute, woodwinds
- Sol Schlinger - baritone saxophone
- Al Casamenti, Mundell Lowe - guitar
- Trigger Alpert - double bass
- James Campbell - drums, strings
