= The Nutty Squirrels (album) =

Studio album by The Nutty Squirrels
- Released: 1959
- Genre: Children's, jazz
- Label: Hanover
- Producer: Don Elliott, Granville Alexander "Sascha" Burland

The Nutty Squirrels chronology
The Nutty Squirrels (1959)	Bird Watching (1961)

Professional ratings
Review scores
Source	Rating
DownBeat	3/5 stars

The Nutty Squirrels is a children's album by Don Elliott and Granville Alexander "Sascha" Burland under the name Nutty Squirrels. The album was released in 1959 by Hanover, a label owned by Bob Thiele and Steve Allen. The song "Uh! Oh! Part-2" reached the Top 20.

== Track listing ==
=== Side one ===
1. "Uh! Oh! Part-1" (Sascha Burland, Don Elliott) - 2:14
2. "Uh! Oh! Part-2" (Burland, Elliott) – 2:19
3. "Ding Dong" (Burland, Elliott) – 2:08
4. "Something Like That" (Burland, Elliott) – 2:08
5. "Jumping Bean" (Burland, Elliott) – 1:5
6. "Nutty" (Thelonious Monk) – 2:15

=== Side two ===
1. "Uh-Huh" (Burland, Elliott, Leu Camacho) – 2:29
2. "Salt Peanuts" (Dizzy Gillespie, Kenny Clarke) – 2:15
3. "Eager Beaver" (Stan Kenton) – 2:02
4. "Bang!" (Burland, Elliott) – 2:02
5. "Nutcracker" (Burland, Elliott) – 2:05
6. "Zowee" (Burland, Elliott) – 2:05

== Personnel ==
- Don Elliott
- Granville Alexander "Sascha" Burland
- Al Caiola – guitar
- Don Arnone – guitar
- Jack Six – double bass
- Ronnie Bedford – drums
