= The Nutty Squirrels =

Jazz virtual band

- Genres: Jazz
- Years active: 1959–1964
- Labels: Hanover, RCA Victor
- Past members: Don Elliott; Granville Alexander "Sascha" Burland

The Nutty Squirrels were a jazz virtual band formed in imitation of Alvin and the Chipmunks. The Nutty Squirrels' music was characterized by their use of scat singing. They received a Top 40 hit in late-1959 as the song "Uh! Oh!". They also preceded The Alvin Show in which they appeared on television in 1960 as The Nutty Squirrels Present, but the show was not as successful as the Chipmunks became.

The group's first two albums, The Nutty Squirrels and Bird Watching, were released in 1959. The Nutty Squirrels' final album, The Nutty Squirrels Sing A Hard Day's Night and Other Smashes, marked a stylistic change from their first two albums, featuring covers of the Beatles songs.

== Biography ==
After The Chipmunks' initial success in 1958, plans were almost immediately made to make them into an animated cartoon series. Unfortunately, there were some initial art direction snags (specifically with the character designs) and the show was delayed. This gap resulted in a race between the Chipmunks and an imitative group created by jazz musicians Don Elliott and Granville Burland, which they called the Nutty Squirrels.

Both musical groups featured the defining sped-up voices, but Ross Bagdasarian Sr.'s Chipmunks favored popular music while the Squirrels favored jazz, particularly of the bebop variety. Ultimately, the Squirrels made it to television first, in the animated series The Nutty Squirrels Present (appearing in September 1960), but it was not as popular as the Chipmunks would become.

"Uh! Oh! (Part 1)" peaked at #45 on the Billboard Pop Singles Chart, while "Uh! Oh! (Part 2)" peaked at #14.

In the 2007 live-action/animated movie Alvin and the Chipmunks, during the credits, Ian Hawke (David Cross) is trying to get three squirrels to sing.

== Personnel ==
- Don Elliott: vocals, trumpet, vibraphone, possible other instruments
- Granville Alexander "Sascha" Burland: vocals

Among the New York-based session musicians playing on these albums were Cannonball Adderley, (alto sax), Bobby Jaspar (flute), and Sam Most (clarinet)

== Discography ==
=== Albums ===
Year	Album	Label
1959	The Nutty Squirrels	Hanover
1961	Bird Watching	Columbia
1964	The Nutty Squirrels Sing A Hard Day's Night and Other Smashes	MGM

=== Singles ===
Year	Single	Chart Positions				Album
Year	Single	US	US R&B	US Country	CAN CHUM	Album
1959	"Uh! Oh! Part 1"	45	—	—	—	The Nutty Squirrels
1959	"Uh! Oh! Part 2"	14	9	—	7	The Nutty Squirrels
1960	"Eager Beaver"	—	—	—	—	The Nutty Squirrels
1960	"Uh-Huh + 3"	—	—	—	—	The Nutty Squirrels
1960	"Please Don't Take Our Tree for Christmas"	—	—	—	—	—N/a
1963	"Hello Again"	—	—	—	—	—N/a

== Reception ==
In his 2019 autobiography, Mr. Know-It-All, John Waters wrote, "I should have told my mother about the Nutty Squirrels. They did jazz and they weren't junkies. This sped-up vocal group who imitated the Chipmunks actually beat them to television with an animated show called The Nutty Squirrels Present, and they looked down on the pop sound of Alvin and his gang. The Nutty Squirrels actually had a big jazz hit with "Uh Oh, Part One and Two," but if you go back and listen to the rest of their discography, you'll be blown away by some of their other riffs. These cats were smoking! If my mom had heard jazz like this at the wrong speed, she might have loved it."
