= Maurice Frigara =

French orchestra conductor (1874–1955)

Maurice Frigara (2 July 1874 – 27 January 1955) was a French conductor of Corsican descent, mainly active in the opera house.

== Career ==
Frigara was born in Lille and studied under Charles Dancla, Lambert Massart and Benjamin Godard at the Paris Conservatoire.

He first conducted at the theatre in Lille in 1895, and also taught at the Conservatoire in the city. He worked in Antwerp then Cairo in 1898. For five years he was at the Théâtre Graslin in Nantes, and conducted in Marseille and Lyon, in the latter leading productions of Der Ring des Nibelungen, Die Meistersinger von Nürnberg, Gwendoline and Pantagruel (Claude Terrasse).

Frigara conducted at the Grand Opera seasons at Covent Garden in 1909 (Faust, Louise, Samson et Dalila) and 1910 (the same repertoire plus La Habanéra by Laparra). In 1917 he was music director at the Théâtre Trianon-Lyrique in Paris, concentrating on the late 18th and early 19th century repertoire, while also at times conducting the Concerts Lamoureux. He was considered a conscientious, precise and sometimes dry interpreter.

Having made his debut there in May 1920 conducting La traviata, he was the musical director of the Opéra-Comique from 1925–1932, including in 1925 a revival of the third Entrée of Les Indes Galantes by Rameau and La Lépreuse by Lazzari. Around this time the American violinist and band leader Enoch Light studied with Frigara in Paris.

In 1934 Frigara conducted the premiere of Fragonard by Pierné at the Théâtre de la Porte Saint-Martin. Frigara also conducted the premiere of the opérette Au soleil du Mexique by Maurice Yvain at the Théâtre du Châtelet on 18 December 1935. He was active as a conductor at that theatre as late as December 1939. He died in Paris, aged 80.

== Recordings ==
Frigara conducted several important early recordings for Columbia with the tenor Georges Thill in the 1920s, and records of orchestral music in the 1930s (Chabrier's España, Fete Polonaise from Le roi malgré lui, Massenet's Scenes alsaciennes, and the overtures to Martha, Le roi d'Ys and Light Cavalry) as well as other vocal extracts with opera singers.
