= Cootie Williams in Hi-Fi =

Studio album by Cootie Williams
- Released: 1958
- Recorded: March 5 & 25 and April 8, 1958
- Studio: Webster Hall, New York City
- Genre: Jazz
- Length: 39:49
- Label: RCA Victor; LPM 1718
- Producer: Fred Reynolds

Cootie Williams chronology
The Big Challenge (1957)	Cootie Williams in Hi-Fi (1958)	Porgy & Bess Revisited (1959)

Cootie Williams in Hi-Fi is an album by trumpeter Cootie Williams, recorded in 1958 and released on the RCA Victor label.

== Reception ==
Professional ratings
Review scores
Source	Rating
AllMusic	4.5/5 stars

Cub Koda on AllMusic said the album "shows that Williams' broad style was still mightily intact some 30 years after joining the Ellington fold".

== Track listing ==
1. "Just in Time" (Jule Styne, Betty Comden, Adolph Green) – 3:29
2. "Summit Ridge Drive" (Artie Shaw) – 3:18
3. "Nevertheless I'm in Love with You" (Harry Ruby, Bert Kalmar) – 3:41
4. "On the Street Where You Live" (Frederick Loewe, Alan Jay Lerner) – 3:28
5. "I'll See You in My Dreams" (Isham Jones, Gus Kahn) – 3:20
6. "Contrasts" (Jimmy Dorsey) – 2:55
7. "Caravan" (Juan Tizol, Duke Ellington, Irving Mills) – 3:40
8. "If I Could Be with You (One Hour Tonight)" (James P. Johnson, Henry Creamer) – 2:39
9. "Air Mail Special" (Charlie Christian, Benny Goodman, Jimmy Mundy) – 3:13
10. "My Old Flame" (Arthur Johnston, Sam Coslow) – 3:40
11. "Swingin' Down the Lane" (Jones, Kahn) – 3:24
12. "New Concerto for Cootie" (Cootie Williams) – 3:02
- Recorded at Webster Hall in NYC on March 5 (tracks 6–8 & 12), March 25 (tracks 1 & 9–11) and April 8 (tracks 2–5), 1958

== Personnel ==
- Cootie Williams – trumpet
- Billy Byers, Bobby Byrne, Chauncy Welsch (tracks 2–5), Lou McGarity (tracks 1, 6 & 12), Richard Hixon – trombone
- Boomie Richman (tracks A1-A5 & 9–11), Al Klink (tracks 1 & 6–12), Elwyn Fraser, Nick Caizza (tracks: 6–8 & 12), Phil Bodner, Romeo Penque, Stanley Webb (tracks 2–5) – saxophones
- Barry Galbraith (track 2–5), George Barnes (tracks 6–8 & 12), Tony Mottola (tracks 1 & 9–11) – guitar
- Hank Jones (tracks 1 & 9–11), Henry Rowland (track 2–5), Lou Stein (track 6=8 & 12) – piano
- Eddie Safranski – double bass
- Don Lamond (track 6–8 & 12), Osie Johnson (tracks 1–5 & 9–11) – drums
- Bill Stegmeyer – arranger
