= Louis Bacon (musician) =

American musician (1904–1967)

Louis Bacon (November 1, 1904, Louisville, Kentucky – December 8, 1967) was an American jazz trumpeter and vocalist.

Bacon's family moved to Chicago when he was a young child. After a short stint playing with Zinky Cohn in Michigan, he relocated to New York City in 1928, where he worked through 1938 with musicians such as Louis Armstrong, Benny Carter, Duke Ellington, Bingie Madison, Bessie Smith, and Chick Webb. He contracted tuberculosis in 1938, resulting in a performance hiatus, but by early 1939 was playing with Benny Carter once more. Later that same year, he embarked on a tour of Europe with Willie Lewis; remaining there for two years, he recorded under his own name as well as with Lewis and Freddy Johnson. After his return to the US, he worked with Garvin Bushell, Cootie Williams, and Jesse Stone, but shortly after the end of World War II, he stopped playing once again due to persistent health problems.

He played trumpet again briefly in 1959–60, working in New York, and late in his career taught voice and sang with Wilbur De Paris.
