= Counterpoint for Six Valves =

Studio album by Don Elliott and Rusty Dedrick
- Released: 1956
- Recorded: March 16 & 17, 1955 and April 23, 1956; Reeves Sound Studios, New York City
- Genre: Jazz
- Label: Riverside; RLP 12-218
- Producer: Bill Grauer and Orrin Keepnews

Don Elliott chronology
Don Elliott Sings (1955)	Counterpoint for Six Valves (1956)	The Voice of Marty Bell - The Quartet of Don Elliott (1956)

6 Valves 10-inch LP Cover

Counterpoint for Six Valves is an album by American jazz trumpeters Don Elliott and Rusty Dedrick which was recorded in 1955 for the Riverside label. The album features six tracks that were originally recorded in 1955 and released as the 10-inch LP, Six Valves along with four additional tracks from 1956. This album was also reissued on the Jazzland label as Double Trumpet Doings.

== Reception ==
Professional ratings
Review scores
Source	Rating
Allmusic	4/5 stars

Allmusic awarded the album 4 stars.

== Track listing ==
All compositions by Dick Hyman except as indicated

1. "Mine" (George Gershwin, Ira Gershwin) - 3:08
2. "Vampire Till Ready" - 5:03 originally released on 6 Valves
3. "Your Own Iron" - 5:01 originally released on 6 Valves
4. "It's Easy to Remember" (Lorenz Hart, Richard Rodgers) - 4:55 originally released on 6 Valves
5. "The Bull Speaks" - 3:20
6. "Dominick Seventh" - 5:08 originally released on 6 Valves
7. "Gargantuan Chant" - 4:41 originally released on 6 Valves
8. "When Your Lover Has Gone" (Einar Aaron Swan) - 5:07 originally released on 6 Valves
9. "Henry's Mambo" - 2:15
10. "Theme and Inner Tube" - 1:59
- Recorded at Reeves Sound Studios, New York City on March 16 & 17, 1955 (tracks 2–4 & 6–8) and April 23, 1956 (tracks 1, 5, 9 & 10)

== Personnel ==
- Rusty Dedrick (tracks 1–3 & 5–10), Don Elliott (tracks 1–7, 9 & 10) - trumpet
- Dick Hyman - piano (tracks 1–9)
- Mundell Lowe - guitar (tracks 1–9)
- Eddie Safranski - bass (tracks 1–9)
- Don Lamond - drums (tracks 1–9)
