= Dick Cary =

American jazz trumpeter, pianist, and composer

- Birth name: Richard Durant Cary
- Born: July 10, 1916 Hartford, Connecticut, U.S.
- Died: April 6, 1994 (aged 77) Glendale, California, U.S.
- Genres: Jazz, swing, dixieland
- Occupation(s): Musician, composer, arranger
- Instrument(s): Trumpet, piano
- Years active: 1940s–1980s

Richard Durant Cary (July 10, 1916 – April 6, 1994) was an American jazz trumpeter, composer and arranger.

He was born in Hartford, Connecticut, United States. Cary earned a bachelor's degree in music from Wesleyan University in 1938 and started working in Connecticut and New York. He landed full-time solo work at Nick's in Greenwich Village in New York City in 1941 (through 1943) and played with Joe Marsala in 1942. In 1943, he also worked as a staff arranger for Benny Goodman and played with the Casa Loma Orchestra and Brad Gowans. During a stint in the Army in 1944-46 stationed on Long Island, he managed to continue recording with Muggsy Spanier and Wild Bill Davison among others. After his discharge he worked with Billy Butterfield, then was pianist in the initial formation of Louis Armstrong's All-Stars in 1947–48. In 1949–50 he was in Jimmy Dorsey's orchestra, and in the 1950s worked with Eddie Condon, Pee Wee Russell, Max Kaminsky, Bud Freeman, Jimmy McPartland, and starting in 1957 a long-term collaboration with Bobby Hackett at the Henry Hudson Hotel in New York.

When that engagement ended in 1959 he moved to Los Angeles, where he became an active freelance, touring, and studio musician. He also began writing and arranging music for the Tuesday Night Friends, who convened at his home every Tuesday for decades, a tradition that continued following his death. The band was rarely heard by the public except for annual appearances at the Los Angeles Classic Jazz Festival and Sacramento Jazz Jubilee.

In the latter days of his life some of these rehearsals were recorded, forming the basis of the posthumous release Dick Cary and His Tuesday Night Friends Playing Dick Cary Originals. The ongoing group, directed by Dick Hamilton, recorded the album Dick Cary's Tuesday Night Friends: Catching Up in 1997. Cary also provided an extended interview to Floyd Levin in 1991. His life is the subject of the bio-discography Strictly a Musician: Dick Cary by Derek Coller, published in 2012.

Dick Cary died in April 1994, in Glendale, California, at the age of 77.

== Discography ==
As leader

- Dixieland Goes Progressive (Golden Crest, 1957)
- Hot and Cool (Stereo-Craft, 1958)
- Dick Cary & His Dixieland Doodlers (Columbia, 1959)
- The Amazing Dick Cary (Riff, 1975)
- California Doings (1981)
- Dick Cary & His Tuesday Night Friends (Arbors, 1996)
- Catching Up (Klavier, 1999)
- Got Swing? (Arbors, 2001)

As sideman

- 1947 Town Hall Concert: The Unissued Part, Louis Armstrong
- 1950 Dixie by Dorsey, Jimmy Dorsey
- 1953 Jam Session: Coast to Coast, Eddie Condon
- 1954 Satchmo at Symphony Hall, Louis Armstrong
- 1955 Bixieland, Eddie Condon
- 1955 Jazz Great, Jack Teagarden
- 1956 Barbara Lea, Barbara Lea
- 1956 My Memories of You, Maxine Sullivan/Jack Teagarden
- 1956 We're in the Money, Pee Wee Russell
- 1957 Ruth Brown
- 1957 Dixieland Heaven, Lee Castle
- 1957 Gotham Jazz Scene, Bobby Hackett
- 1958 Rendezvous with Rex Rex Stewart (Felsted)
- 1958 Henderson Homecoming Rex Stewart (United Artists)
- 1959 Rumpus on Rampart Street, Edmond Hall
- 1960 Play TV Themes, Jimmy McPartland
- 1962 Midnight in Moscow, Eddie Condon
- 1964 In Japan, Eddie Condon
- 1965 That Happy Dixieland Jazz, Jimmy McPartland
- 1973 Clarinet Gumbo, Barney Bigard
- 1978 Midnight Believer, B.B. King
- 1980 Pee Wee in Hollywood, Pee Wee Erwin
- 1994 1936–1942, Joe Marsala
