= Birdwatch =

Birdwatch may refer to:

- Birdwatch (magazine), a British monthly magazine for birdwatchers, established in 1992
- Community Notes (previously Birdwatch), a feature of X (formerly Twitter) to fight misinformation, launched in 2021

== See also ==
- BirdWatch Ireland, a conservation organisation
- Birdwatching (disambiguation)
