= Arthur Trappier =

American jazz musician

Arthur "Traps" Trappier (May 28, 1910, in Georgetown, South Carolina – May 17, 1975, in New York City) was an American jazz drummer.

Trappier played with Charlie Skeets and Blanche Calloway in the late 1920s. After working steadily through the 1930s, he joined Fats Waller in 1941-42 before serving in the military during World War II. He led his own trio in various hotels in New York City in the 1950s, and played as a sideman into the 1970s. Among those he played with are Josh White, Wilbur De Paris, Edmond Hall, Sy Oliver, Hot Lips Page, Buddy Johnson, Wingy Manone, Sidney Bechet, Benny Goodman, and Red Allen.

== Discography ==
- Edmond Hall, Swing Session (Commodore, 1959)
- Conrad Janis, Conrad Janis and His Tailgate Five (Jubilee, 1954)
- Punch Miller & Mutt Carey, Jazz New Orleans (Savoy, 1955)
- Tony Parenti, Tony Parenti and His New Orleanians (Jazzology, 1958)
- Willie "The Lion" Smith, Accent On Piano (Urania, 1957)
- Rex Stewart, Rendezvous with Rex (Felsted, 1959)
- Fats Waller, Handful of Keys (RCA Victor, 1957)
