= Project 3 Records =

American record label

- Founded: 1966
- Founder: Enoch Light
- Status: Inactive
- Genre: Pop, Jazz
- Country of origin: U.S.
- Location: New York, NY

Project 3 Records was a record label founded in 1966 by Enoch Light, featuring LPs of pop and jazz performances employing high quality stereo recording techniques, marketed at premium prices.

== Origins ==
American musician, bandleader, and recording engineer Enoch Light founded Project 3 Records in August 1966. It was a joint undertaking with sewing machine manufacturer The Singer Company. Singer had entered the home entertainment and music business several years earlier as part of its diversification process, with a line of battery-operated phonographs. In 1963 Singer had also acquired KLH Research and Development Corporation, manufacturer of KLH loudspeakers, and stereo and radio products.

Project 3 was Light's industry move after having headed up Command Records at ABC-Paramount Records for six years. He founded the Command label in 1959, sold it to ABC in October that year, and ran the label as an autonomous division until his departure in 1965. The new label was targeted to release recordings in the Command vein, employing quality stereo recording techniques, marketed at a premium price. Albums were released in three formats, as phonograph records, reel-to-reel pre-recorded tapes, and 8-track tapes.

== Artists ==
Project 3 artists, some of whom had recorded for Light on Command, included Tony Mottola, Bobby Hackett, Buddy Greco, Stan Freeman, and Peter Matz, in addition to Enoch Light and the Light Brigade.

In 1973, with the imprimatur of Popular Science magazine, Project 3 released a test record to set up and calibrate 4-channel quadraphonic sound.

A year later, the label released a quadraphonic test record produced for Fisher Electronics. The liner notes described the unique test disk:

This is a most unusual recording. Side 1 is produced via the CD-4 discrete 4 channel system and Side 2 is encoded and produced through the SQ matrix system. We believe that as of this date it is the only recording in the world which has been produced under these conditions and we do hope that it will prove to be entertaining as well as helpful in setting up your equipment and in demonstrating the different methods of 4 channel production.

== Sale ==
Light continued to direct Project 3 until his death in August 1978. The label was acquired by record industry executive Herb Linsky in June 1979.

In 1980, Linsky entered into licensing arrangements to release sessions by Larry Elgart and his Orchestra, Louis Armstrong, and Paul Whiteman. He also signed a deal for national distribution of Project 3 recordings by Arista Records.

In July 1982, Linsky launched Project 3's midline label, Seagull Records.

In September 1991, Linsky sold Project 3 to Essex Entertainment, a New Jersey–based company engaged in music licensing and allied activities.

== Select Albums ==
Artist	Title	Catalog No.	Year
Spanish Strings	Enoch Light & The Light Brigade	PR500SD	1966
The Kissin' Cousins	The Kissin' Cousins Sing	PR5001SD	1966
Tony Mottola	Heart & Soul Guitar	PR5003SD	1966
Top Hits . . . C. 1420-1635 A.D.	The Renaissance Quartet	PR7000SD	1966
That Midnight Touch	Bobby Hackett	PR5006SD	1967
Urbie Green and Twenty of the "World's Greatest"	Twenty-One Trombones	PR50014SD	1967
The Free Design	Kites Are Fun	PR50019SD	1967
Pearl Bailey	The Real Pearl	PR50022SD	1967
Jerry Goldsmith	Planet of the Apes (Original Motion Picture Soundtrack)	PR50023SD	1968
Enoch Light and The Brass Menagerie	Enoch Light and The Brass Menagerie	PR50036SD	1969

Source: "Project 3 Total Sound". discogs.com.
