= Henderson Homecoming =

Live album by Rex Stewart and the Fletcher Henderson Alumni
- Released: 1959
- Recorded: August 1, 1958
- Venue: Great South Bay Jazz Festival, Long Island, New York
- Genre: Jazz
- Length: 37:10
- Label: United Artists; UAL 4009/UAS 5009

Rex Stewart chronology
Rendezvous with Rex (1958)	Henderson Homecoming (1959)	Porgy & Bess Revisited (1959)

Henderson Homecoming is a live album performed by cornetist Rex Stewart with the Fletcher Henderson Alumni that was recorded at the Great South Bay Jazz Festival in 1958 and released on the United Artists label.

== Reception ==
Professional ratings
Review scores
Source	Rating
AllMusic	1.5/5 stars

Scott Yanow of AllMusic states: "This live concert from 1958 by what was billed as 'the Fletcher Henderson Alumni' and led by cornetist Rex Stewart should have been an artistic success, particularly since a similar group the previous year had recorded a classic studio album. Unfortunately, much of the music is extremely ragged, sloppily played, and under-rehearsed. There are some fine players on this concert (none of whom are identified on the LP), but relatively few ever played with Henderson. In addition, the repertoire (which only includes two Henderson songs) is particularly odd, with an irrelevant three-song ballad medley, a blues for singer Big Miller, and a forgettable side-long three-part 'Georgia Sketches' co-written by Dick Cary and Stewart. The results are strange and rather disappointing, so it is not at all surprising that this music has never appeared on CD, and that there were no further 'reunions'."

== Track listing ==
All compositions by Fletcher Henderson except where noted

1. "Wrapping It Up" – 3:41
2. "D Natural Blues" – 5:31
3. "These Foolish Things" (Jack Strachey, Holt Marvell) – 2:58
4. "Willow Weep for Me" (Ann Ronell) – 2:34
5. "Over the Rainbow" (Harold Arlen, Yip Harburg) – 2:55
6. "Hello Little Girl" (Big Miller) – 2:16
7. "Georgia Sketches – 1st Movement: Motion / 2nd Movement: Tiempo Espagnole / 3rd Movement: The Earth is Good" (Rex Stewart, Dick Cary) – 17:15

== Personnel ==
- Rex Stewart – cornet
- Allan Smith, Joe Thomas, Paul Webster, Taft Jordan – trumpet
- Benny Morton, Dicky Wells, James Comegys – trombone
- Dick Cary – E flat horn
- Garvin Bushell, Hilton Jefferson – alto saxophone
- Bob Wilbur, Buddy Tate – tenor saxophone
- Haywood Henry – baritone saxophone
- Red Richards – piano
- Chauncey Westbrook – guitar
- Bill Pemberton – double bass
- Mousey Alexander – drums
- Big Miller – vocals
