= Rendezvous with Rex =

Studio album by Rex Stewart
- Released: 1958
- Recorded: January 28 & 31, 1958
- Studio: NYC
- Genre: Jazz
- Length: 39:47
- Label: Felsted; FAJ.7001
- Producer: Stanley Dance

Rex Stewart chronology
The Big Challenge (1957)	Rendezvous with Rex (1958)	Henderson Homecoming (1959)

Rendezvous with Rex is an album by cornetist Rex Stewart which was recorded in 1958 and released on the Felsted label.

== Reception ==
Professional ratings
Review scores
Source	Rating
AllMusic	4/5 stars

Scott Yanow of AllMusic states: "This interesting and well-rounded LP has two separate sessions originally cut for the Felsted label. Cornetist Rex Stewart is fiery on the first date, jamming on a trio of his worthy but obscure originals ... The three numbers from the later date have moody arrangements ... Superior music that will hopefully resurface". Digby Fairweather in the Rough Guide to Jazz wrote: "this is a fine session with Stewart's sometimes buzzy open-horn still in full control".

== Track listing ==
1. "Tillies Twist" (Rex Stewart, George Edwin) – 4:39
2. "Pretty Ditty" (Stewart, Dick Cary) – 6:26
3. "Tell Me More" (Stewart, Edwin) – 8:28
4. "Trade Winds" (Stewart, Cary) – 7:22
5. "My Kind of Gal" (Stewart, Maurice Goodman) – 5:11
6. "Blue Echo" (Stewart, Cary) – 7:41

== Personnel ==
- Rex Stewart – cornet, vocals
- Dick Cary – trumpet, piano (tracks 2 & 4–6)
- George Stevenson – trombone (tracks 1, 3 & 5)
- Garvin Bushell – clarinet, bassoon (tracks 2, 4 & 6)
- Hilton Jefferson – clarinet, alto saxophone (tracks 2, 4 & 6)
- Haywood Henry – clarinet, baritone saxophone (tracks 1, 3 & 5)
- George Kelly – tenor saxophone (tracks 1, 3 & 5)
- Willie "The Lion" Smith – piano (tracks 1 & 3)
- Everett Barksdale – guitar (tracks 2, 4 & 6)
- Joe Benjamin (tracks 2, 4 & 6), Leonard Gaskin (tracks 1, 3 & 5) – bass
- Mickey Sheen (tracks 2, 4 & 6), Arthur Trappier (tracks 1, 3 & 5) – drums
