= The Voice of Marty Bell – The Quartet of Don Elliott =

Studio album by Marty Bell and Don Elliott
- Released: 1956
- Recorded: January 17 & 23, 1956; New York City
- Genre: Jazz
- Length: 37:53
- Label: Riverside; RLP 12-206
- Producer: Bill Grauer and Orrin Keepnews

Don Elliott chronology
Counterpoint for Six Valves (1955–56)	The Voice of Marty Bell – The Quartet of Don Elliott (1956)	The Bob Corwin Quartet featuring the Trumpet of Don Elliott (1956)

The Voice of Marty Bell – The Quartet of Don Elliott is an album by American jazz trumpeter Don Elliott's Quartet with vocalist Marty Bell which was recorded in 1956 for the Riverside label.

== Reception ==
Professional ratings
Review scores
Source	Rating
Allmusic	3/5 stars

Allmusic awarded the album 3 stars.

== Track listing ==
1. "I Didn't Know What Time It Was" (Lorenz Hart, Richard Rodgers) – 2:33
2. "I Thought About You" (Johnny Mercer, Jimmy Van Heusen) – 3:03
3. "Moonlight in Vermont" (John Blackburn, Karl Suessdorf) – 3:51
4. "The Girl Next Door" (Ralph Blane, Hugh Martin) – 3:16
5. "According to Moyle" – 3:27
6. "S'posin'" (Paul Denniker, Andy Razaf) – 2:57
7. "This Can't Be Love" (Hart, Rodgers) – 2:02
8. "The Love of My Life" – 3:00
9. "I Found a New Baby" (Jack Palmer, Spencer Williams) – 4:57
10. "You Go To My Head" (J. Fred Coots, Haven Gillespie) – 3:26
11. "September Song" (Kurt Weill, Maxwell Anderson) – 3:11
12. "Me and You" (Ernie Wilkins) – 2:10

== Personnel ==
- Marty Bell – vocals
- Don Elliott – vibraphone
- Bob Corwin – piano
- Vinnie Burke – bass
- Jimmy Campbell – drums
