= The Nutty Squirrels Present =

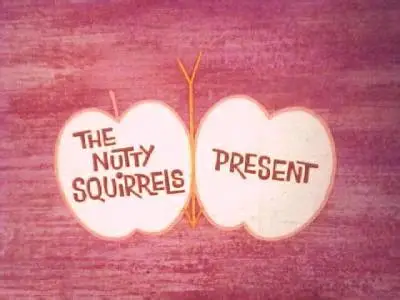
- The show's titlecard
- Genre: Cartoon series
- Directed by: Joseph Bernstein; William Hudson
- Voices of: Alexander "Sascha" Burland; Don Elliott
- Country of origin: United States
- Original language: English
- No. of seasons: 1
- No. of episodes: 30 x 30min episodes (USA) 150 shorts (USA) 90 x 6 min shorts (Australia)

Production
- Executive producers: Robert Bean; Fred Levinson
- Producer: Joseph Bernstein
- Running time: 30 min. per combined show, 6 min. each cartoon

Original release
- Release: September 1960

The Nutty Squirrels Present is a 1960 animated television series that was inspired by characters from The Nutty Squirrels hit 1959 novelty record. The series was produced by Transfilm-Wylde Animation, and aired for one season (1960–1961) on first-run syndication in the United States with over 150 six-minute episodes, being formatted originally into 30 half-hour shows.

The original cartoons themselves were purchased from overseas countries in such locales as Eastern Europe by the Russian-born Fima Noveck, the President of Flamingo Telefilm Sales. After the original cartoons arrived in the United States, they would receive a new soundtrack, including English language and music, that would appeal to American children.

== Reception ==
In his 2019 autobiography, Mr. Know-It-All, John Waters wrote, "I should have told my mother about the Nutty Squirrels. They did jazz and they weren't junkies. This sped-up vocal group who imitated the Chipmunks actually beat them to television with an animated show called The Nutty Squirrels Present, and they looked down on the pop sound of Alvin and his gang. The Nutty Squirrels actually had a big jazz hit with "Uh Oh, Part One and Two," but if you go back and listen to the rest of their discography, you'll be blown away by some of their other riffs. These cats were smoking! If my mom had heard jazz like this at the wrong speed, she might have loved it."

== Broadcasting television stations ==
=== United States ===
- WSBK-TV / Channel 38• Boston, Massachusetts
- KTVI-TV / Channel 2• St. Louis, Missouri
- KYTV-TV / Channel 44• Springfield, Ohio
- WKBN-TV / Channel 27• Youngstown, Ohio
- WLBC-TV / Channel 49• Muncie, Indiana
- WGN-TV / Channel 9• Chicago, Illinois
- KVOS-TV / Channel 38• Bellingham, Washington
- KHSL-TV / Channel 43• Chico, California

=== Canada ===
- KVOS-TV / Channel 12• via Bellingham, Washington

=== Overseas ===
Australia

Known in Australia simply as The Nutty Squirrels, the series was first transmitted on Australian television during early 1966, on the ABC. It first featured as part of a series called Cartoon Time, which ran on Saturday afternoons at 5pm. This 40-minute program also consisted of other cartoons, including King Leonardo and His Short Subjects and Felix the Cat.

The Nutty Squirrels cartoon series then made frequent appearances over the years, appearing off and on in 1970 and also during 1972. At the time in Australia, these transmissions were in black and white.

From 1976, the Nutty Squirrels series was again shown, this time in its original color format.

The main transmission of the Nutty Squirrels cartoon series in Australia came in the form of a package of at least 80 x 6 minute episodes. From December 1977, the Nutty Squirrels series was permanently adapted to the 5:30pm weekday timeslot, running Monday through to Friday. During this run, the Nutty Squirrels series ran right through to March 1979.

- ABC-TV Channel 2 Sydney, NSW Australia
- ABC-TV Channel 3 Canberra, ACT Australia

Through the ABC's facilities in Sydney, the cartoon was relayed and broadcast to all the other Australian state capital cities, plus all the Australian regional areas covered by the ABC.

After broadcast on the ABC, the Nutty Squirrels series, was for a short time, resyndicated to some of Australia's regional commercial television stations. These were mainly in NSW, with the broadcasts occurring during 1981 and 1982.

- NRN Channel 11 Northern Rivers, NSW Australia
- RTN Channel 8 Northern Rivers NSW Australia
- RVN Channel 2 Wagga, NSW Australia
- CTC Channel 7 Canberra, ACT Australia

New Zealand

In New Zealand cartoons from the Nutty Squirrels series were being shown on CHTV3 (Christchurch) during 1966. They would either be shown at 5pm or just before the 6pm news.

Japan

In Japan, the show was dubbed into Japanese and broadcast on NET (now TV Asahi) from September 21, 1963 to October 25, 1964, the show was retitled "ナッティー・ドリームランド" lit. "Nutty Dreamland" and was sponsored by Megmilk Snow Brand.

== Episodes ==
1. A barrel of fun
2. A horse for dinner
3. A recipe for courage
4. A Santa visit
5. A very strange adventure
6. An old fable
7. And so on
8. Animal school
9. Animals in dreamland
10. Bad Company
11. Bear cub at large
12. Big deal
13. Big little hero
14. Brave whistle light
15. Bullies in a Toyshop
16. The Cheese Hunters
17. Chess game in the sky
18. Dangerous dreamland
19. Detective nightmare
20. Dodo and the monster
21. Dog magician hunt
22. Don't be a pig
23. Dumb Dora
24. Enchanted morning
25. Eraser and Pencil
26. Fire and Ice
27. Fire fighters
28. Foxy Wolf
29. Friendship Island
30. Golden feather
31. Gone with the goose
32. Grandpa Caleb's canoe
33. Grandpa whirlwind
34. Happy end
35. His master's mouse
36. Hole in the sky
37. How it all began
38. Hurray for the winner
39. Imp and the angel
40. Just reward
41. Kingdom of color
42. Kings conscience
43. Kitten Blues
44. Life in doggywood
45. Life with Eva
46. Lion and gazelle
47. Lion and the donkey
48. Locomotive
49. Magic mirror
50. Magic mountain
51. Magic penny
52. Magic room
53. Magic wood
54. Malicious ink spot
55. Marsh King
56. Master skier
57. Millie the kid
58. Monkey and the Atom
59. Monkey Business
60. Moon Monster
61. On the moon
62. Once upon a time
63. One and one is two
64. One little pig
65. One sunny day
66. Pedro's Secret
67. Play ball
68. Pole painters
69. Polite neighbors
70. Prehistoric adventure
71. Puppy's pets
72. Rabbit's feet for luck
73. Railroad story
74. Recipe for courage
75. Red riding hood
76. Road pest
77. The Robin and the Bumble Bee
78. Round and Round
79. Scarecrow adventure
80. Shining star
81. Shoo! Fire!
82. Sing sing sparrow
83. Skating follies
84. Sleepy keeper
85. Sticks and stones
86. top thief
87. Storm in a coop
88. Teamwork
89. Teddy wants to sleep
90. The barefoot king
91. The Bargain
92. The Beggars Treasure
93. The Bouncing Bassoon
94. The Brave Mosquito
95. The Concertina
96. The dinosaur hunt
97. The Drought
98. The faker
99. The first song
100. The Great Bank Robbery
101. The Hold Up
102. Kind orphan
103. The king and the shepherd
104. The lion cub
105. The little cobbler
106. The little glutton
107. The lonely mermaid
108. The magic rainbow
109. The magic wand
110. The old man and the spring
111. The party
112. The peace treaty
113. The puppeteer
114. The racers
115. The rescue
116. The Santa visit
117. The scheme
118. The soccer game
119. The Stable Boy and the Princess
120. The statue
121. The trouble shooter
122. The wind
123. The wolf trap
124. The Wooden Boy
125. Thermometer fever
126. Three clumsy hunters
127. Three lumberjacks
128. Tiger trouble
129. Tit for Tat
130. To Texas and back
131. Treacherous fox
132. Two magicians
133. Wanderlust
134. War and peace
135. War of colors
136. What a Boar
137. Wheels
138. When in Rome, Don't
139. Where There's Smoke, There's Fame
140. Who's cooking
141. Who's Scared
142. Winged wedding
143. Winter palace
144. Woody in toyland
145. Zoo revolution

== See also ==
- The Alvin Show
- The Nutty Squirrels
