= The Bob Corwin Quartet featuring the Trumpet of Don Elliott =

Studio album by Bob Corwin and Don Elliott
- Released: 1956
- Recorded: June 1956; New York City
- Genre: Jazz
- Label: Riverside; RLP 12-220
- Producer: Bill Grauer and Orrin Keepnews

Don Elliott chronology
| The Voice of Marty Bell - The Quartet of Don Elliott (1956) | The Bob Corwin Quartet featuring the Trumpet of Don Elliott (1956) | A Musical Offering by Don Elliott (1956) |

The Bob Corwin Quartet featuring the Trumpet of Don Elliott is an album by American jazz pianist Bob Corwin featuring trumpeter Don Elliott which was recorded in 1956 for the Riverside label.

== Track listing ==
1. "My Shining Hour" (Harold Arlen, Johnny Mercer)
2. "Isn't It Romantic?" (Lorenz Hart, Richard Rodgers)
3. "I'll Remember April" (Gene de Paul, Patricia Johnston, Don Raye)
4. "I Remember You" (Johnny Mercer, Victor Schertzinger)
5. "Rico-Jico Joe" (Don Elliott)
6. "It Might as Well Be Spring" (Oscar Hammerstein II, Richard Rodgers)
7. "I'll Take Romance" (Hammerstein, Ben Oakland)
8. "Gone with the Wind" (Herb Magidson, Allie Wrubel)
9. "It Could Happen to You" (Johnny Burke, Jimmy Van Heusen)
10. "Ponytail" (Bob Corwin)

== Personnel ==
- Bob Corwin - piano
- Don Elliott - trumpet
- Ernie Furtado - bass
- Jimmy Campbell - drums
