= Echoes of Harlem =

1936 composition by Duke Ellington

"Echoes of Harlem", also known as "Cootie's Concerto", (not to be confused with "Concerto for Cootie," 1940) is a 1936 composition by Duke Ellington. A piece with a jazz blues sound in F minor with an ostinato piano pattern, it has been cited as one of Ellington's "mood" pieces. It opens with trumpet, playing blues sounds in F minor over the ostinato pattern, followed by a segment of 14 bars with some harmony. The third part, played in velvet sound, by the saxophone section, is in Ab major, but starts with Db, the subdominant of Ab. The piece contains thus 3 segments. The original recording features Cootie Williams on trumpet, playing in what Lawrence McClellan describes as "muted" and "in a somber minor key". It has been performed by Roy Eldridge, with Oscar Peterson and Herb Ellis.

Jazz musician and musicologist André Hodeir wrote the following:

Few records do more than the Concerto to make possible an appreciation of how great the role is that sonority can play in the creation of jazz. The trumpet part is a true bouquet of sonorities. The phrases given to it by Ellington which have a melodic beauty which should not be overlooked, are completely taken over by Cootie. He makes them shine forth in dazzling colors, then plunges them in the shade, plays around with them, make them glitter or delicately tones them down; and each time what he shows us is something new.
