= Bill Shanahan =

American football player and coach (born 1938)

Biographical details
- Born: July 27, 1938 (age 88); Wahoo, Nebraska, U.S.
- Education: Huron University (BS); Adams State University (MA); University of Utah (PhD)

Playing career
- 1956–1959: Huron
- Positions: Center, linebacker

Coaching career (HC unless noted)
- 1964–1965: Western State (CO) (assistant)
- 1966–1968: Northern Colorado (assistant)
- 1969–1972: Western New Mexico
- 1973–1974: Utah (assistant)
- 1975: Western Illinois (DE/LB)
- 1976–1978: Western Illinois

Head coaching record
- Overall: 25–37–1

Accomplishments and honors

Championships
- 1 RMAC Mountain Division (1970)

Bill Shanahan (born July 27, 1938) is an American former football coach. He served as the head football coach at Western New Mexico University in Silver City, New Mexico from 1969 to 1972 and Western Illinois University in Macomb, Illinois from 1976 to 1978, compiling a career college football head coaching record of 25–37–1.

Shanahan attended Genoa High School in Genoa, Nebraska. He played college football at Huron College—later known as Huron University—in Huron, South Dakota as a center and linebacker.

== Head coaching record ==
Year	Team	Overall	Conference	Standing	Bowl/playoffs
Western New Mexico Mustangs (Rocky Mountain Athletic Conference) (1969–1972)
1969	Western New Mexico	1–7	1–4	6th (Mountain)	
1970	Western New Mexico	5–4	5–1	T–1st (Mountain)	
1971	Western New Mexico	3–5	3–3	T–3rd (Mountain)	
1972	Western New Mexico	3–5	3–3	T–4th	
Western New Mexico:		12–21	12–11		
Western Illinois Leathernecks (NCAA Division II independent) (1976–1977)
1976	Western Illinois	7–3–0			
1977	Western Illinois	3–7–0			
Western Illinois Leathernecks (Association of Mid-Continent Universities) (1978)
1978	Western Illinois	3–6–1	1–3–1	T–4th	
Western Illinois:		13–16–1	1–3–1		
Total:		25–37–1			
National championship Conference title Conference division title or championship game berth
