= The Solid Trumpet of Cootie Williams =

Studio album by Cootie Williams
- Released: 1962
- Recorded: April 4, 1962
- Studio: Miami, FL
- Genre: Jazz
- Label: Moodsville; MVLP 27
- Producer: Sid Wayman

Cootie Williams chronology
Do Nothing Till You Hear from ... Cootie (1960)	The Solid Trumpet of Cootie Williams (1962)

The Solid Trumpet of Cootie Williams is an album by trumpeter Cootie Williams that was recorded in 1962 and released on the Moodsville label (a Prestige subsidiary).

Professional ratings
Review scores
Source	Rating
AllMusic	3/5 stars

== Track listing ==
1. "Concerto for Cootie" (Duke Ellington) – 2:37
2. "Sugar Blues" (Clarence Williams, Lucy Fletcher) – 2:51
3. "You're Nobody till Somebody Loves You" (Russ Morgan, Larry Stock, James Cavanaugh) – 4:15
4. "Some of These Days" (Shelton Brooks) – 3:46
5. "Night Train" (Jimmy Forrest, Oscar Washington) – 5:24
6. "Around the World in Eighty Days" (Victor Young, Harold Adamson) – 4:03
7. "Liza" (George Gershwin, Ira Gershwin, Gus Kahn) – 3:10
8. "Birmingham Blues" (Hampton Reese) – 5:26

== Personnel ==
- Cootie Williams – trumpet
- Nat Jones – piano
- Harold Dodson – bass
- Bill Peeples – drums
