= Pinch wheel =

Tape recorder component

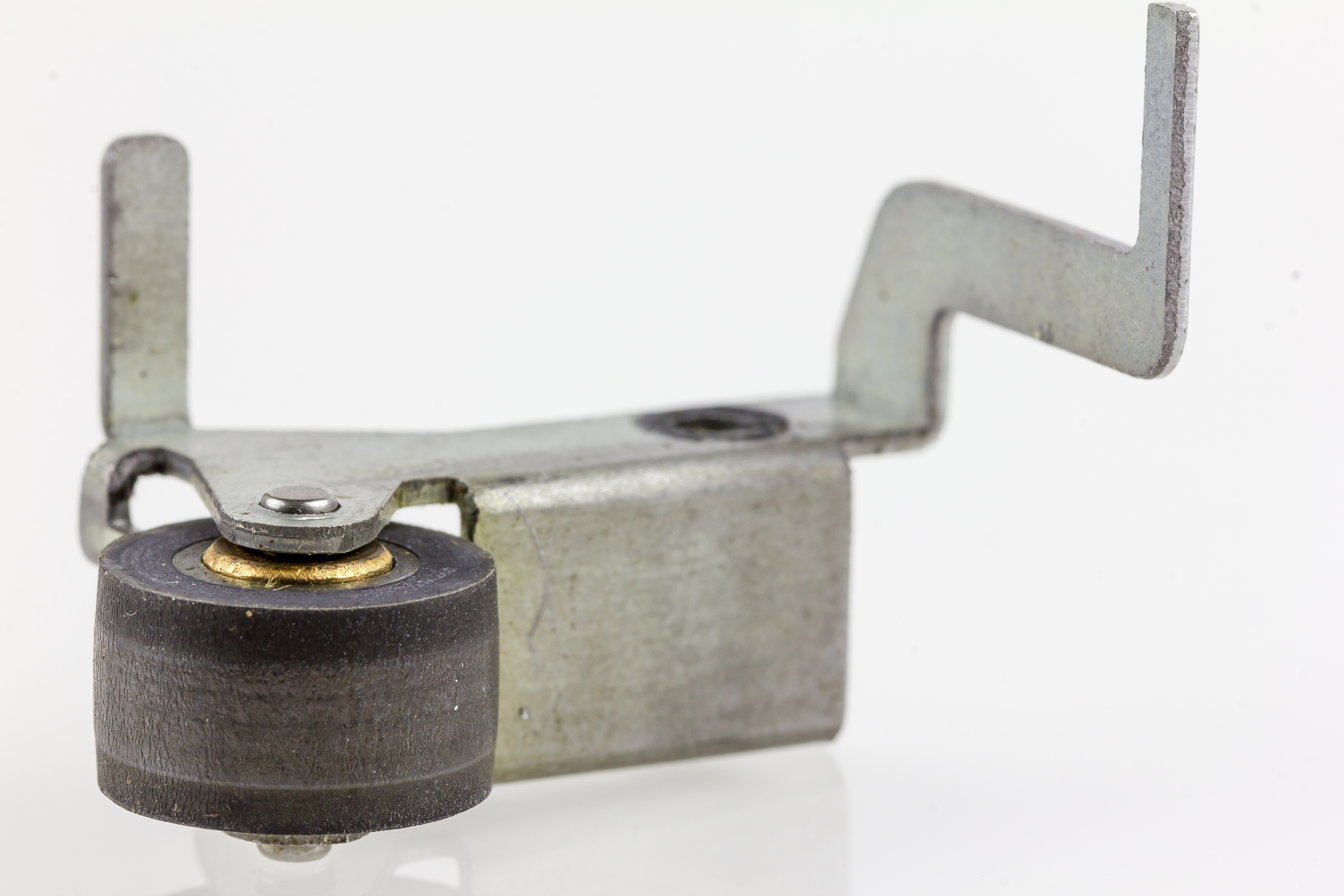
Pinch roller

Pinch wheel or pinch roller is the term for the "rubber" wheel which forms part of the drive mechanism in many forms of tape recorder and player. The magnetic tape is squeezed between the "capstan" (a precision shaft driven at constant speed) and the pinch wheel and so is drawn past whatever combination of record, replay and erase heads the "tape deck" employs.

The pliability, surface, and other physical characteristics of the "rubber" material from which the pinch wheel is made is critical to the steady progress of the tape, and usually degrades with time, and may result in speed fluctuations, causing "wow and flutter", various noises and even damage to the tape. Pressure of pinch wheel against the capstan is usually removed when not in operation, to reduce incidence of "flat spots" on the rubber surface. Replacement of pinch wheels is a common maintenance problem.

A similar situation applies to some record players, where a pinch wheel is the intermediary between the spindle of the drive motor and the rim of the turntable, with the same maintenance issues.
