= Chronological Classics =

French compilation album series (founded 1989)

The Chronological Classics series consists of 965 jazz compact discs compiled by Gilles Pétard in France. Classics Records was a record company and label founded by Pétard in Paris around 1989. The company also reissued recordings by Rhythm & blues artists in a series which ran to 190 CDs.

The label set out to assemble comprehensive collections of jazz recordings by hundreds of artists previously issued on 78 rpm records (according to European copyright laws, recordings enter the public domain after 50 years) and issue them on compact disc. The series was issued with discographical details and colour-coordinated packaging. Classics Records concentrated on reissuing American jazz, since American record companies were not issuing early jazz editions on anything like this scale. Classics Records had several European rivals in the early 1990s such as Masters of Jazz and Jazz Archives.

The series was initially distributed by subscription, with five issues released each month. The series began with number 500 in December 1989 with Ella Fitzgerald 1935–1937. The series consists of the output of the greatest jazz musicians up to the early 1950s, including Louis Armstrong, Count Basie, Duke Ellington, and Benny Goodman, as well as lesser known artists, such as Jabbo Smith, Claude Hopkins, and Tiny Parham.

The Classics label issued new CDs regularly until 2004, when its original distributor went bankrupt. The back catalogue was then acquired by Abeille Musique, which operated the label until July 2008. Five titles announced for an August 2008 release were never issued. Many of the titles have also been given a digital release under the label 'Complete Jazz Series' and are available on streaming services.

For many years, the cover of the CDs contained a typographical error. Instead of "Chronological", the typo at the top said "Chronogical". This mistake was corrected only in 2005, and a new logotype is used on the disc covers since number 1380 (Dizzy Gillespie 1953).
