= Don Elliott =

American jazz musician (1926–1984)

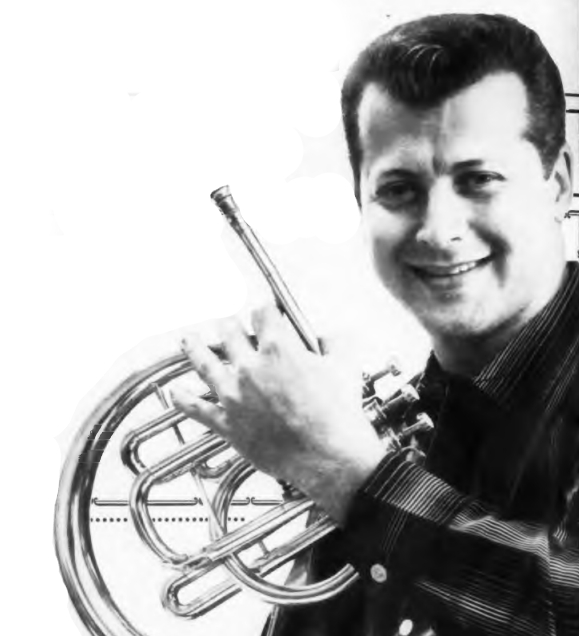
- Elliott in a 1958 advertisement

Background information
- Born: Don Helfman; October 21, 1926; Somerville, New Jersey, U.S.
- Died: June 5, 1984 (aged 57) Weston, Connecticut, U.S.
- Genres: Jazz
- Occupation: Musician
- Instruments: Trumpet, vibraphone, mellophone

Don Elliott Helfman (October 21, 1926 – June 5, 1984), known as Don Elliott, was an American jazz trumpeter, vibraphonist, vocalist, and mellophone player. Elliott recorded over 60 albums and 5,000 advertising jingles throughout his career.

== Career ==
Elliott played mellophone in his high school band and played trumpet for an army band. After studying at the University of Miami he added vibraphone to his instruments. He recorded with Terry Gibbs and Buddy Rich before forming his own band. From 1953 to 1960, he won the DownBeat Readers' Poll several times for "miscellaneous instrument-mellophone."

Known as the "Human Instrument", Elliott performed jazz as a vocalist, trombonist, flugelhornist, and percussionist. He pioneered the art of multitrack recording, composed prize-winning advertising jingles, prepared film scores, and built a thriving production company. He scored several Broadway productions, including James Thurber's The Beast in Me and A Thurber Carnival, as well as Frank D. Gilroy's The Only Game in Town. He also provided one of the voices for the novelty jazz duo the Nutty Squirrels.

Elliott was a longtime associate of Quincy Jones, contributing vocals to Jones's scores for the films The Pawnbroker (1962), Walk, Don't Run (1966), In the Heat of the Night (1967), $ (1971), The Hot Rock (1972) and The Getaway (1972). Elliot also composed the score to the short film Que Puerto Rico (1963) directedby Tibor Hirsch and The Happy Hooker starring Lynn Redgrave.

Elliott owned and operated one of the first multitrack recording studios in New York City and in Weston, Connecticut, where he died of cancer in 1984. He was married to actress Doris Wiss (1929-2015).

== Discography ==
=== As leader or co-leader ===
- Doubles in Brass (Vanguard, 1954)
- The Don Elliott Quintet (RCA Victor, 1954)
- Mellophone (Bethlehem, 1955)
- Don Elliott Sings (Bethlehem, 1955)
- Counterpoint for Six Valves (Riverside, 1955) – with Rusty Dedrick (also released as Double Trumpet Doings)
- Vibrations (Savoy, 1956) – with Cal Tjader
- The Voice of Marty Bell - The Quartet of Don Elliott (Riverside, 1956)
- The Bob Corwin Quartet featuring the Trumpet of Don Elliott (Riverside, 1956)
- A Musical Offering (ABC, 1956)
- Don Elliott at the Modern Jazz Room (ABC, 1956)
- Eddie Costa, Mat Mathews & Don Elliott at Newport (Verve, 1957)
- The Voices of Don Elliott (ABC, 1957)
- Music for the Sensational Sixties (Design, 1957)
- Jamaica Jazz (ABC-Paramount, 1958)
- The Mello Sound (Decca, 1958)
- The Nutty Squirrels (Hanover, 1959) with Alexander "Sascha" Burland
- Mr. Versatile
- Love is a Necessary Evil (Columbia, 1962)
- Rejuvenation (Columbia, 1975)

=== As sideman ===
- 1954 Skin Deep, Louie Bellson
- 1954 Joe Puma Quintet, Joe Puma
- 1955 Songs by Sylvia Syms, Sylvia Syms
- 1956 The Swingin' Miss "D", Dinah Washington
- 1956 Sylvia Syms Sings, Sylvia Syms
- 1956 Desmond: Here I AM, Paul Desmond
- 1956 Featuring Don Elliott, Paul Desmond
- 1956 Special Delivery, Janet Brace
- 1956 Braff!, Ruby Braff
- 1957 Swingin' with Terry Gibbs Orchestra & Quartet, Terry Gibbs
- 1957 My Fair Lady Loves Jazz Billy Taylor
- 1957 Hi-Fi Suite, Leonard Feather
- 1958 Sing Me a Swing Song, Bobby Short
- 1958 Connee Boswell Sings Irving Berlin, Connee Boswell
- 1958 Legrand Jazz, Michel Legrand
- 1959 Amor!: The Fabulous Guitar of Luiz Bonfa, Luiz Bonfá
- 1959 Porgy & Bess, Mundell Lowe
- 1959 The Ivory Hunters, Bob Brookmeyer/Bill Evans
- 1961 Like Tweet, Joe Puma
- 1963 The Boss of the Blues, Charles Brown
- 1964 The Many Faces of Art Farmer, Art Farmer
- 1964 Golden Boy, Quincy Jones
- 1965 Ballads My Way, Charles Brown
- 1967 In the Heat of the Night OST, Quincy Jones
- 1972 The Hot Rock OST, Quincy Jones
- 1973 There Goes Rhymin' Simon, Paul Simon
- 1976 I Heard That!, Quincy Jones
- 1977 One of a Kind, Dave Grusin
- 1996 Verve Jazz Masters 57, George Shearing
- 2001 Tenderly: An Informal Session, Bill Evans – recorded 1956 & 1957
