= Tony Mottola =

American jazz guitarist (1918–2004)

- Born: Anthony C. Mottola; April 18, 1918; Kearny, New Jersey, U.S.
- Died: August 9, 2004 (aged 86) Denville, New Jersey, U.S.
- Genre: Jazz
- Occupation: Musician
- Instrument: Guitar
- Years active: 1936–1988
- Labels: Command; Project 3
- Formerly of: The Tonight Show Orchestra; Frank Sinatra; Perry Como

Anthony C. "Tony" Mottola (April 18, 1918 – August 9, 2004) was an American jazz guitarist who released dozens of solo albums. He was born in Kearny, New Jersey, and died in Denville.

== Career ==
Like many of his contemporaries, Mottola began learning to play the banjo, but then took up the guitar. He had his first guitar lessons from his father. He toured with an orchestra led by George Hall in 1936, marking the beginning of his professional life.

Mottola's first recordings were duets with the guitarist Carl Kress. By the age of only twenty-one, he was recruited by Kress to serve as a staff guitarist at the CBS Radio network. During his tenure with the network, he founded the Tony Mottola Trio which was featured on Johnny Desmond's show Face the Music. In 1945, he also collaborated with the accordionist John Serry Sr. in a recording of "Leone Jump" for Sonora Records (MS-476-3) which was played in jukeboxes throughout the U.S. In 1946, he also joined forces with Serry and other members of the Joe Biviano Accordion and Rhythm Sextette in a recording for Sonora Records which included Tom Delaney's composition "Jazz Me Blues" (Accordion Capers, MS-476). A copy of this recording has been permanently archived at the Smithsonian Institution's National Museum of American History. Subsequently, in 1948, Mottola's trio collaborated with Carole Coleman and Danny Daniels on the CBS program Make Mine Music. During his tenure at CBS, Mottola also collaborated with Sidney Lumet, Paddy Chayefsky, John Frankenheimer, and Rod Serling. By 1967, he emerged as an executive at the founding of Project 3 Records. His only charted single as a soloist was "This Guy's in Love with You", which reached No. 22 on the Billboard magazine Easy Listening Top 40 in the summer of 1968.

During the course of his career, Mottola also emerged as a freelance composer for several luminaries within the world of entertainment, including Rosemary Clooney, Bing Crosby, Burl Ives, and Mitch Miller.

He worked often on television, appearing as a regular on shows hosted by vocalist Perry Como and comedian Sid Caesar. He was also recruited by a young Yul Brynner to serve as music director for the 1950s series Danger. From 1958 to 1972, he was a member of The Tonight Show Orchestra led by Skitch Henderson, then by Doc Severinsen. He composed music for the TV documentary Two Childhoods, which was about Vice President Hubert Humphrey and writer James Baldwin, and won an Emmy Award for his work. In 1980, Mottola began performing with Frank Sinatra, often in duets, appearing at Carnegie Hall and the White House. He retired from the music business in 1988 but kept playing at home almost every day.

== Discography ==
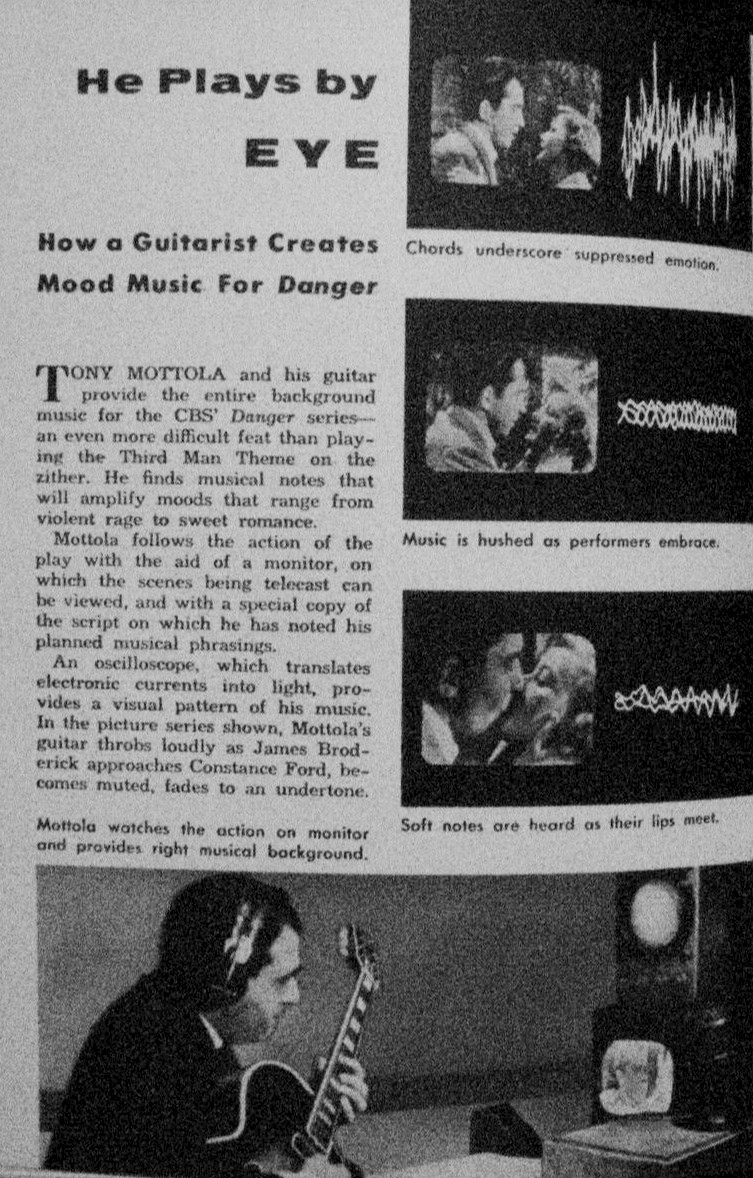
Mottola was music director for the television series Danger in 1954. He used a copy of the script with notations and watched a television monitor to provide the right music.

During the course of his career, Tony Mottola recorded for several labels including Command Records, Project 3 Records, RCA Victor, and Sonora Records. His recordings include:

External audio
- You may hear Tony Mottola performing "Swing Low Sweet Chariot" with the accordionist John Serry Sr. and the Joe Biviano Accordion and Rhythm Sextette in 1945; Here on Archive.org
- Tony Mottola & Orchestra perform "Under Paris Skies" in 1953 Here on archive.org
- Tony Mottola's album "Roman Guitar" Volume Two in 1962 Here on archive.org

External videos
- You may see Tony Mottola performing with Carol Coleman on "Make Mine Music" in 1949; Here on archive.org

=== As leader ===
- Let's Put Out the Lights (RCA Camden, 1956)
- Mr. Big: Tony Mottola...Guitar (Command, 1959)
- Roman Guitar (Command, 1960, No. 26 US)
- String Band Strum-Along (Command, 1961)
- Folk Songs (Command, 1961)
- Roman Guitar – Vol 2 (Command, 1961, No. 41 US)
- Tony Mottola a Napoli (Command, 1963)
- Tony Mottola and His Orchestra (Command, 1963)
- Romantic Guitar (Command, 1963)
- Sentimental Guitar (Command, 1964)
- Guitar...Paris (Command, 1964)
- Spanish Guitar (Command, 1965)
- Love Songs Mexico S.A. (Command, 1965, No. 85 US)
- Guitar U.S.A. (Command, 1966)
- Amor Mexico (Command, 1966)
- Heart & Soul (Project 3, 1966)
- Lush, Latin & Lovely (Project 3, 1967)
- A Latin Love-In (Project 3, 1967, No. 198 US)
- Love Songs from Mexico (Command, 1967)
- Roma Oggi/Rome Today (Project 3, 1968)
- Warm, Wild and Wonderful (Project 3, 1968)
- Joins the Guitar Underground (Project 3, 1969)
- Hawaii Five-O (Design, 1969)
- Close to You (Project 3, 1970)
- Tony Mottola's Guitar Factory (Project 3, 1970, No. 189 US)
- Warm Feelings (Project 3, 1971)
- Two Guitars for Two in Love (Project 3, 1972)
- Superstar Guitar (Project 3, 1972)
- Tony Mottola and the Quad Guitars (Project 3, 1973)
- Holiday Guitars (Project 3, 1974)
- Tony Mottola and the Brass Menagerie (Project 3, 1974)
- I Only Have Eyes for You (Project 3, 1975)
- Goin' Out of My Head (Project 3, 1979)
- Stardust (Project 3, 1980)
- All the Way (Project 3, 1983)

=== As sideman ===
With Tony Bennett

- To My Wonderful One (Columbia, 1960)

With Ray Charles

- Spring Is Here (MGM, 1955)
- Something Wonderful (Command, 1961)
- Rome Revisited (Command, 1962)
- Young Lovers On-Broadway (Command, 1965)
- Memories of a Middle-Aged Movie Fan (Atco, 1968)

With Urbie Green

- Twenty-One Trombones (Project 3, 1967)
- Green Power (Project 3, 1971)
- Bein' Green (Project 3, 1972)
- Urbie Green's Big Beautiful Band (Project 3, 1974)

With Dick Hyman

- Electrodynamics (Command, 1963)
- Fabulous (Command, 1963)
- Keyboard Kaleidoscope (Command, 1964)
- The Man from O.R.G.A.N. (Command, 1965)
- Happening! (Command, 1966)
- Concerto Electro (Command, 1970)
- Fantomfingers (Project 3, 1971)
- Traditional Jazz Piano (Project 3, 1973)

With Enoch Light

- Pertinent Percussion Cha Cha's (Command, 1959)
- Provocative Percussion Vol. 2 (Command, 1960)
- Cancoes de Paises Distantes (Musidisc 1960)
- Far Away Places (Command, 1960)
- Vibrations (Command, 1962)
- Big Band Bossa Nova (Command, 1962)
- My Musical Coloring Book (Command, 1963)
- 1963: the Year's Most Popular Themes (Command, 1963)
- Dimension 3 (Command, 1964)
- Discotheque: Dance Dance Dance (Command, 1964)
- Magnificent Movie Themes (Command, 1965)
- Film Fame (Project 3, 1967)
- Enoch Light's Action (Project 3, 1967)
- The Best of Hollywood Movie Hits '68-'69 (Project 3, 1968)
- 12 Smash Hits (Project 3, 1968)
- Enoch Light and the Glittering Guitars (Project 3, 1969)
- The Best of the Movie Themes 1970 (Project 3, 1970)
- The Big Band Hits of the Thirties (Project 3, 1970)
- Big Band Hits of the 30's & 40's (Project 3, 1971)
- Big Hits of the 20's (Project 3, 1971)
- The Big Band Sound of the Thirties (Project 3, 1971)
- The Big Band Hits of the 40s & 50s (Project 3, 1973)
- Spanish Strings (Project 3, 1973)
- Future Sound Shock (Project 3, 1973)
- Big Hits of the Seventies Vol. 2 (Project 3, 1975)
- The Disco Disque (Project 3, 1975)

With Charles Magnante

- Roman Spectacular (Grand Award, 1957)
- Roman Spectacular Vol. 2 (Grand Award, 1957)
- Percussion Italiano (Grand Award, 1961)

With Johnny Mathis

- Open Fire, Two Guitars (Columbia, 1959)

With Joe Reisman

- Armen's Theme (RCA Victor, 1956)
- Door of Dreams (RCA Victor, 1957)
- Party Night at Joe's (RCA Victor, 1958)

With Doc Severinsen

- Tempestuous Trumpet (Command, 1961)
- The Big Band's Back in Town (Command, 1962)
- Twin Trumpet Discotheque Au Go Go (Command, 1965)
- Command Performances (Command, 1966)
- Fever (Command, 1966)
- Live! (Command, 1966)
- The Great Arrival! (Command, 1969)
- Trumpets and Crumpets and Things (ABC 1973)

With Frank Sinatra

- She Shot Me Down (Reprise, 1981)
- L.A. Is My Lady (Qwest, 1984)

With others

- Jan August, Cha Cha Charm (Mercury, 1959)
- Louie Bellson, Breakthrough! (Project 3, 1968)
- Bobby Byrne, The Jazzbone's Connected to the Trombone (Grand Award, 1959)
- Al Caiola, Guitars, Woodwinds & Bongos (United Artists, 1960)
- Al Caiola, Percussion and Guitars (Time, 1960)
- Dorothy Collins, Experiment Songs (Motivation, 1961)
- Ray Conniff, S Wonderful! (Columbia, 1956)
- Perry Como, Sing to Me Mr. C (RCA Victor, 1961)
- Frederick Fennell, Frederick Fennell Conducts Gershwin (Mercury, 1961)
- Stu Davis, Land, Sky and Water (RCA Victor, 1947)
- Robert De Cormier, Walking in the Sunshine (Command, 1967)
- Milton DeLugg, Add-A-Part Jazz (Columbia, 1956)
- The Free Design, Kites Are Fun (Project 3, 1967)
- The Free Design, You Could Be Born Again (Project 3, 1968)
- Johnny Desmond, Blue Smoke (Columbia, 1960)
- Georgia Gibbs, Swinging with Her Nibs (Mercury, 1956)
- Jackie Gleason, Jackie Gleason Presents "Oooo!" (Capitol, 1957)
- Bobby Hackett, That Midnight Touch (Project 3, 1967)
- Richard Hayman, Harmonica Holiday (Mercury, 1961)
- Neal Hefti, Concert Miniatures (Vik, 1957)
- Frank Hunter, The Sound of Strings Vol. 2 (Medallion, 1960)
- Ralph Hunter, The Wild Wild West (RCA Victor, 1959)
- Burl Ives, Cheers (Decca, 1959)
- Don Lamond, Off Beat Percussion (Command, 1962)
- Yank Lawson, Ole Dixie (ABC-Paramount, 1965)
- Eddie Layton, Caravan (Mercury, 1959)
- Richard Maltby, Many Sided Maltby (Sesac, 1958)
- Richard Maltby, Ballads and Blues (Roulette, 1962)
- Mitch Miller, Peace Sing-Along (Atlantic, 1970)
- Jelly Roll Morton, Dick Hyman, Transcriptions for Orchestra (Columbia, 1974)
- Bucky Pizzarelli, Playing Bix Beiderbecke & Bill Challis and Carl Kress & Dick McDonough (Monmouth Evergreen, 1974)
- Ruth Price, My Name Is Ruth Price...I Sing! (Kapp, 1955)
- John Serry Sr., Accordion Capers - Joe Biviano & His Rhythm Sextette (Sonora, 1946)
- Hymie Shertzer, All the King's Saxes (Disneyland, 1958)
- Roy Smeck, The Magic Ukulele of Roy Smeck Wizard of the Strings (ABC-Paramount, 1959)
- Lou Stein, Eight for Kicks Four for Laughs (Jubilee, 1956)
- Kirby Stone Four, Frank Loesser's Broadway Hit Guys & Dolls (Columbia, 1962)
- Sylvia Syms, Syms by Sinatra (Reprise, 1982)
- Cootie Williams, Cootie Williams in Hi-Fi (RCA Victor, 1958)

== Archived works ==
- Smithsonian Institution's National Museum of American History preserved a copy of Tony Mottola's performance with the accordionists Joe Biviano and John Serry from the album Accordion Capers (Sonora, MS-476, 1946) as part of its permanent collection.
