= Cootie Williams =

American jazz, blues and R&B trumpeter (1911–1985)

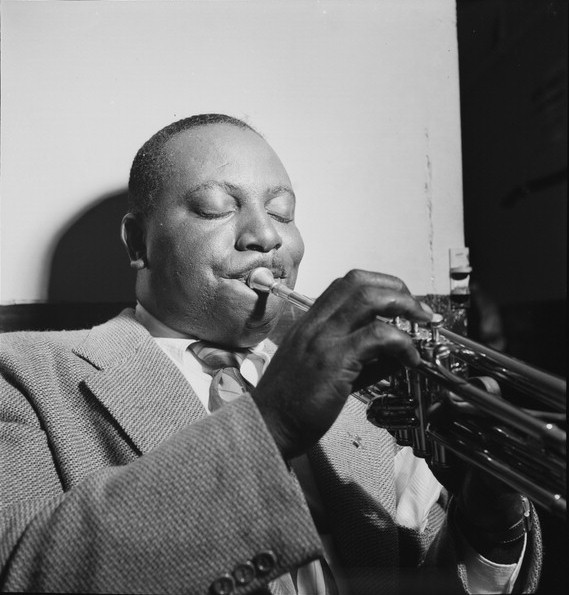
- Williams, between 1938 and 1948; by William P. Gottlieb

Background information
- Born: Charles Melvin Williams; July 10, 1911; Mobile, Alabama, U.S.
- Died: September 15, 1985 (aged 74) New York City, U.S.
- Genres: Jazz; jump blues; R&B
- Occupation: Musician
- Instruments: Trumpet; vocals
- Years active: 1925–1975
- Labels: Jazztone; RCA Victor; Jaro; Decca; Warner Bros.; Warwick; Moodsville
- Formerly of: Chick Webb; Fletcher Henderson; Duke Ellington; Benny Goodman
- Burial place: Woodlawn Cemetery, Bronx

Charles Melvin "Cootie" Williams (July 10, 1911 – September 15, 1985) was an American jazz, jump blues, and rhythm and blues trumpeter.

== Biography ==
Born in Mobile, Alabama, Williams began his professional career at the age of 14 with the Young Family band, which included saxophonist Lester Young. According to Williams, he acquired his nickname as a boy when his father took him to a band concert; when it ended, his father asked him what he'd heard, and he replied, "Cootie, cootie, cootie."

Williams with Duke Ellington in Helsinki, 1963

In 1928, he made his first recordings with the pianist James P. Johnson in New York, where he also worked briefly in the bands of Chick Webb and Fletcher Henderson. Williams rose to prominence as a member of Duke Ellington's orchestra, when the band was booked at the Cotton Club, with which he first performed from 1929 to 1940. He also recorded his own sessions during this time, both freelance and with other Ellington sidemen. Williams was renowned for his "jungle"-style trumpet playing (in the manner of Ellington's earlier trumpeter Bubber Miley and trombonist Tricky Sam Nanton) and for his use of the plunger mute. He also sang occasionally, a notable instrumental feature being in the Ellington piece "Echoes of the Jungle". Ellington wrote ''Concerto for Cootie'' for him, which, when lyrics were added, became "Do Nothing till You Hear from Me". He was also the featured soloist in other Ellington compositions, such as "Echoes of Harlem", "Harlem Air Shaft", and the religious piece "The Shepherd Who Watches Over the Night Flock", which was dedicated to the Rev. John Gensel.

In 1940, Williams joined Benny Goodman's orchestra, a highly publicized move that caused quite a stir at the time (commemorated by Raymond Scott with the song "When Cootie Left the Duke"), then in 1941 formed his own orchestra, in which over the years he employed Charlie Parker, Eddie "Lockjaw" Davis, Bud Powell, Eddie Vinson, and other young players.

In 1947, Williams wrote the song "Cowpox Boogie" while recuperating from a bout with smallpox. He contracted the disease shortly after a vaccination he insisted all band members receive.

By the late 1940s, Williams had fallen into obscurity, having had to reduce his band numbers and finally to disband. In the 1950s, he began to play more rhythm and blues, toured with small groups, and played in the Savoy Ballroom.

In the late 1950s, he formed a small jazz group and recorded a number of albums with Rex Stewart, as well as his own album, Cootie Williams in Hi-Fi (1958). In 1962, he rejoined Ellington and stayed with the orchestra until 1974, after Ellington's death. In 1975, he performed during the Super Bowl IX halftime show. He was a 1991 inductee of the Alabama Jazz Hall of Fame.

== Death ==
Williams died in New York City on September 15, 1985, at the age of 74, from a kidney ailment. He is interred at Woodlawn Cemetery in the Bronx, New York City.

== Discography ==
=== As leader ===
- Cootie Williams and His Orchestra 1941–1944 (Classics, 1995) – earliest solo recordings
- The Big Challenge (Jazztone, 1957)
- Cootie Williams in Hi-Fi (RCA Victor, 1958)
- Around Midnight (Jaro, 1959)
- Cootie (Decca, 1959)
- Porgy & Bess Revisited (Warner Bros., 1959)
- Do Nothing till You Hear from... Cootie (Warwick, 1960)
- The Solid Trumpet of Cootie Williams (Moodsville, 1962)

=== As sideman ===
- Duke Ellington, All Star Road Band Volume 2 (Doctor Jazz, 1985)
- Joya Sherrill, Joya Sherrill Sings Duke (20th Century Fox, 1965)
