= Rex Stewart =

American jazz cornetist (1907–1967)

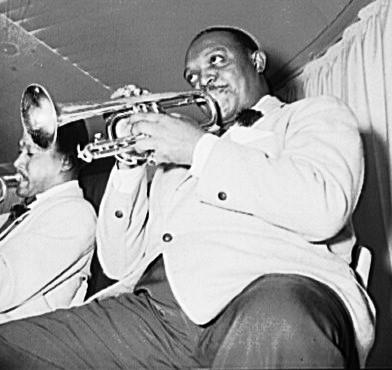
- Stewart with Duke Ellington's orchestra, 1943

Background information
- Born: Rex William Stewart Jr. February 22, 1907; Philadelphia, Pennsylvania, U.S.
- Died: September 7, 1967 (aged 60) Los Angeles, California, U.S.
- Genre: Jazz
- Occupations: Musician; bandleader
- Instrument: Cornet
- Years active: 1920s–1966
- Formerly of: Willie Lewis's Musical Spillers; Horace Henderson; Fletcher Henderson; McKinney's Cotton Pickers; Duke Ellington

Rex William Stewart Jr. (February 22, 1907 – September 7, 1967) was an American jazz cornetist who was a member of the Duke Ellington orchestra.

== Career ==
As a boy, Stewart studied the piano and violin; however, most of his career was spent on the cornet. Stewart dropped out of high school to become a member of the Ragtime Clowns led by Ollie Blackwell. He was with the Musical Spillers led by Willie Lewis in the early 1920s, then with Elmer Snowden, Horace Henderson, Fletcher Henderson, Fess Williams, and McKinney's Cotton Pickers. In 1933, he led a big band at the Empire Ballroom in New York City. Beginning in 1934, he spent eleven years with the Duke Ellington orchestra. Stewart co-wrote "Boy Meets Horn" and "Morning Glory" and supervised recording sessions by members of the Ellington band. He left Ellington to lead "little swing bands that were a perfect setting for his solo playing." He toured in Europe and Australia with Jazz at the Philharmonic from 1947 to 1951.

Stewart at the Aquarium jazz club, New York, 1946

Beginning in the early 1950s, he worked in radio and television and wrote jazz criticism for the Los Angeles Times and the magazines Playboy and DownBeat. The book Jazz Masters of the Thirties is a selection of his criticism. He lived in upstate New York after purchasing a one-hundred-year-old farmhouse. He hosted a jazz radio program in Troy, New York, and owned a small restaurant for a short time near a drag racing track in Vermont. While living in France, he attended the Le Cordon Bleu school of cooking and dedicated his life to becoming a fine cook. Stewart moved to Los Angeles, California, to be near his children. His son, Paul Albert Hardy, lived in New York City. While in Los Angeles, he reunited with musicians from the Ellington band and played jam sessions in clubs. He was a studio musician for The Steve Allen Show, and with George Cole he hosted two radio shows: Dixieland Doings and Things Ain't What They Used to Be.

Stewart died of a brain hemorrhage in Los Angeles, on September 7, 1967, aged 60. His autobiography, Boy Meets Horn, was published in 1991.

== Film and television ==
Stewart made a cameo appearance in the film Rendezvous in July (1950) directed by Jacques Becker. He also appeared in Hellzapoppin' (1941) and The Sound of Jazz (1957) telecast.

== Discography ==
Jam Session, a 1942 short film of Duke Ellington and his orchestra performing "C Jam Blues", featuring Stewart

- Big Jazz with Jack Teagarden (Atlantic, 1953)
- Rex Stewart Plays Duke Ellington with Illinois Jacquet (Grand Award, 1955)
- The Big Challenge with Cootie Williams (Jazztone, 1957)
- Porgy & Bess Revisited with Cootie Williams (Warner Bros., 1959)
- Chatter Jazz with Dicky Wells (RCA Victor, 1959)
- Henderson Homecoming (United Artists, 1959)
- Rendezvous with Rex (Felsted, 1959)
- The Happy Jazz of Rex Stewart (Swingville, 1960)
- Rex Stewart and the Ellingtonians (Riverside, 1960)
- Redhead (Design, 1960)
- The Rex Stewart Memorial Album (Prestige, 1969)
- The Irrepressible Rex Stewart with John Dengler (Jazzology, 1980)
- Rex Stewart with the Alex Welsh Band (Jazzology, 2004)
