= Rusty Dedrick =

American jazz trumpeter and composer (1918–2009)

Lyle "Rusty" Dedrick (12 July 1918 – 25 December 2009) was an American swing and bebop jazz trumpeter and composer born in Delevan, New York, probably better known for his work with Bill Borden, Dick Stabile, Red Norvo, Ray McKinley and Claude Thornhill, among others.

In 1971, Dedrick joined the faculty of the Manhattan School of Music, later becoming director of jazz studies.

He was the uncle of the members of the sunshine pop group The Free Design.

== Discography ==
=== As leader/co-leader ===
- Counterpoint for Six Valves (Riverside, 1955–56) - with Don Elliott
- Salute to Bunny (Counterpoint, 1957)
- Twelve Isham Jones Evergreens (Monmouth, 1964)
- Rhythm and Winds (Esoteric, 1957)

=== As sideman ===
With Bobby Hackett

- Creole Cookin' (Verve, 1967)

With Maxine Sullivan

- Sullivan Shakespeare Hyman (Audiophile, 1971)
