= Command Records =

American record label, 1959–1970

- Founded: 1959
- Founder: Enoch Light
- Defunct: 1970
- Status: Defunct
- Genre: Space age pop; easy listening; popular music
- Country of origin: U.S.
- Location: New York, New York

Command Records was a record label founded by Enoch Light in 1959 and, in October that year, was acquired by ABC-Paramount Records. Light produced a majority of the releases in the label's catalog.

== Origin and history ==
After Grand Award Records, the company focused on producing records targeted at audiophiles. Light and sound engineer Bob Fine handled the recording and engineering responsibilities, employing the technique of multiple microphone pickups. They used different types of microphones whose characteristics were best suited to reproduce the sounds of a particular instrument.

Command Records often featured abstract covers. In the early years, all covers were designed by Josef Albers, whose student Charles E. Murphy served as design director. Several are in the collection of the Museum of Modern Art in New York City. Later covers appeared to be imitations of Albers' work.

In 1966, Light left Command to form Project 3 Records.

== Recording technique ==
While the recording industry had made magnetic tape the standard for recording music for release on vinyl, Command's albums were recorded onto magnetic 35mm film. Light used the width of the film strip to create multitrack recordings, as opposed to the more limited two or three tracks offered by most recording studios at the time; the slightly higher linear speed provided an advantage in analog fidelity and the sprocket-driven film limited the "wow and flutter" problems associated with tape recording. This enabled Light to record more instruments individually and adjust their audio input levels, as well as their stereo position.

== Command test record ==
The Command test record (Stereo Check Out) was an LP album produced by Command Records in 1960. It contained recordings designed to allow users to test their stereo equipment.

=== Album details ===
Like many other Command records, the Stereo Check Out came in a gatefold cover with extensive liner notes and full technical data inside. Charles Stark narrated both sides, providing both technical details and information about the musical instruments used on the tracks on Side Two.

==== Side one ====
Side One of this LP consists of turntable tests. An oscilloscope is a useful tool when used in conjunction with these tests:

1. Stereo Balance Check
2. Left and Right Channel Check
3. Volume Reference Check
4. Frequency Run Check
5. Output Balance Check
6. Flutter or Wow Check
7. Phasing Check
8. Acoustical Check
9. Rumble Check

==== Side two ====
Side Two of this LP consists of musical selections from the Command catalogue:

1. Hernando's Hideaway (from Provocative Percussion Vol II)
2. Cumana (from Provocative Piano)
3. Tenderly (from bongos)
4. Enjoy Yourself Cha-Cha (from Pertinent Percussion Cha-Cha's)

== Selected albums ==
1. Enoch Light...And His Orchestra – A Discothèque Dance...Dance...Dance
2. Enoch Light...And His Orchestra – Paperback Ballet
3. Enoch Light...And The Light Brigade – Big Bold And Brassy
4. Enoch Light...And The Light Brigade – Vibrations
5. Enoch Light...Big Band Bossa Nova – The New Beat From Brazil
6. Enoch Light...And The Light Brigade - Happy Cha Cha
7. Enoch Light...Command Performances
8. Los Admiradores - Bongos/Flutes/Guitars RS 812 SD 1960
9. Off Beat Percussion – Don Lamond and His Orchestra
10. Terry Snyder And The All Stars – Persuasive Percussion
11. Terry Snyder And The All Stars – Persuasive Percussion Volume 2
12. Terry Snyder And The All Stars – Persuasive Percussion Volume 3
13. Enoch Light...And The Command All Stars – Persuasive Percussion Volume 4
14. Enoch Light...And The Light Brigade – Provocative Percussion
15. Enoch Light...And The Light Brigade – Provocative Percussion Volume 2
16. Provocation Piano – Dick Hyman and His Orchestra
17. The Man From O.R.G.A.N. – Dick Hyman
18. Spanish Guitar – Tony Mottola and his orchestra (1962)
19. Persuasive Trombone of Urbie Green Volume 1
20. Persuasive Trombone of Urbie Green Volume 2
21. Enoch Light...& The Light Brigade – A New Concept of Great Cole Porter Songs CQD40002 1971
22. Doc Severinsen...His Trumpet and Orchestra Fever! CQD40003 1971
23. Ravel – Daphnis Et Chloe, Suite No.2 -Pierre Dervaux Command Classics CC33-11005 1961
24. Ravel Bolero – Rapsodie Espagnole- Pierre Dervaux Command Classics CC33-11007 1961
25. Tony Mottola And His Orchestra – Roman Guitar RS 816 SD

== See also ==
- Grand Award Records
- List of record labels
