= Enoch Light =

American dance band leader and recording engineer (1907–1978)

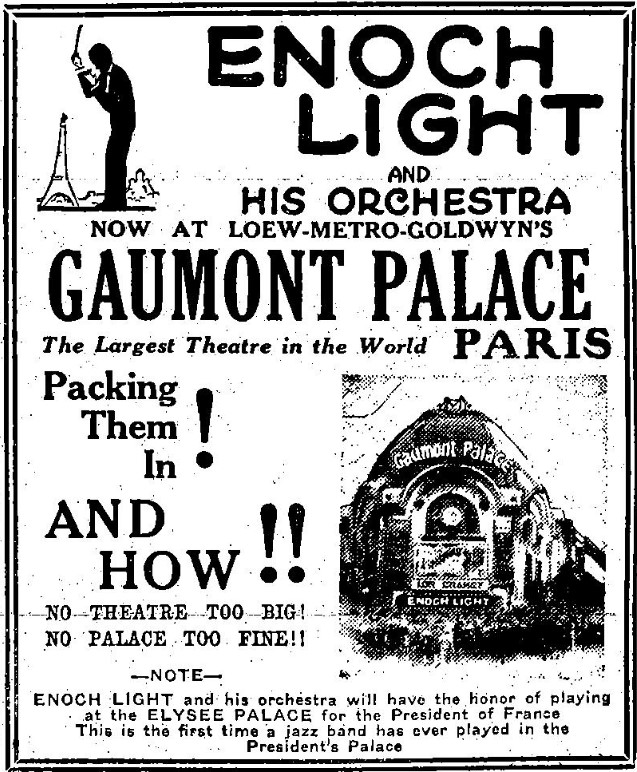
- Occupations: Audio engineer, record label executive and producer
- Known for: Quadraphonic recordings

Enoch Henry Light (August 18, 1907 – July 31, 1978) was an American classically trained violinist, danceband leader, and recording engineer. As the leader of various dance bands that recorded as early as March 1927 and continuing through at least 1940, Light and his band primarily worked in various hotels in New York. For a time in 1928 he also led a band in Paris. In the 1930s Light also studied conducting with the French conductor Maurice Frigara in Paris.

Throughout the 1930s, Light and his band were steadily employed in upscale hotel restaurants and ballrooms in New York, playing popular songs for dining and dancing rather than out-and-out jazz.

At some point his band was tagged The Light Brigade and they often broadcast over radio live from the Hotel Taft in New York, where they had a long residency. Through 1940, Light and his band recorded for various labels including Brunswick, ARC, Vocalion and Bluebird. In 1955, Light founded Grand Award Records and served as president and A&R chief. In 1959 he founded a subsidiary label, Command Records. Grand Award and its subsidiary labels were sold to ABC-Paramount Records in October 1959. Light's name was prominent on many albums both as musician and producer.

== Early years ==
Light was born in Canton, Ohio, on August 18, 1907. While he was a student at Johns Hopkins University, he formed his initial orchestra. When he took that group on tours of Europe in 1928 and 1929, he studied classical conducting at the Mozarteum in Salzburg and the Opera Comique in Paris. He also studied at Ohio State University and the University of Pittsburgh.

== Career ==
Light's early career in the United States had him leading orchestras on recordings and in dance halls, hotels, and theaters for about 10 years. His work was interrupted for two years while he recovered from a head-on automobile collision. When he was ready to resume his career, the big-band era had ended, and he turned to the business side of recorded music.

Light is credited with being one of the first musicians to go to extreme lengths to create high-quality recordings that took full advantage of the technical capabilities of home audio equipment of the late 1950s and early 1960s, particularly stereo effects that bounced the sounds between the right and left channels (often described as "Ping-pong recording"), which had huge influence on the whole concept of multi-track recording that would become commonplace in the ensuing years. Doing so, he arranged his musicians in ways to produce the kinds of recorded sounds he wished to achieve, even completely isolating various groups of them from each other in the recording studio. The first of the albums produced for Command Records, Persuasive Percussion, became one of the first big-hit LP discs based solely on retail sales. Light's music received little or no airplay on the radio, because AM radio, the standard of the day, was monaural and had very poor fidelity. Light went on to release several albums in the Persuasive Percussion series, as well as a Command test record.

Enoch Light released myriad albums in various genres of music under a variety of names during the late 1950s and early 1960s. Some were released under Grand Award Records, which he founded in 1955. He founded Command Records in 1959. ABC-Paramount Records acquired the Light family of labels in October 1959. Light stayed on to manage and handle A&R.

The music was intended for older audiences, presumably because he saw them as more serious audiophiles who had more money to spend on high-end stereo equipment, as opposed to most popular music of the time, which was generally intended for teenagers and young adults. During this time, he pioneered many recording techniques such as the use of 35 mm magnetic film instead of magnetic tape, reducing wow and flutter, being driven by sprockets rather than a rubber pinch wheel. The recordings were released under the "35MM" series, starting from "Stereo 35-MM" released by Command Records. Musicians who appeared on Light's albums include The Free Design, The Critters, Rain, Doc Severinsen, Tony Mottola, Dick Hyman, and organist Virgil Fox (on the Wanamaker Organ). As an arranger, Lew Davies was one of the label's most important contributors.

Light joined forces with the Singer Corporation in August 1966, to help the company launch production of phonograph records, tapes, and tape cartridges. Plans called for a new company to be formed, with Light and Singer each having half-interest and Light as both president and chief executive officer.

Light's new label was called Project 3. It did not concentrate as heavily on stereo effects. Light recorded several successful big band albums with an ace group of New York studio musicians, many of whom were veterans of the bands of the swing era who were still regularly working in New York's television and recording studios. Released as Enoch Light and the Light Brigade, the arrangements used on the recordings were transcribed note-for-note from some of what were the hallmark recordings by many of the best bands of the swing era.

The arranging reconstructions of these now "classic" arrangements were completely reconstructed by arrangers Dick Lieb, Dick Hyman, Tony Mottola and Jeff Hest. Many of the musicians employed for this series of "re-creations" had been members of the original bands that made the original records decades earlier. This veritable Who's Who of swing-era veterans included saxophonists Phil Bodner, Walt Levinsky (both also heavily featured on clarinet), Al Klink, Boomie Richman, Romeo Penque, and Sol Schlinger; trumpeters Mel Davis, Rusty Dedrick, Bernie Glow, Bob McCoy, and Marvin Stamm; trombonists Wayne Andre, Urbie Green, Lou McGarity, Buddy Morrow, and Santo Russo; guitarist Tony Mottola; bassists Bob Haggart and George Duvivier; drummers Don Lamond and Ronnie Zito; pianists Dick Hyman and Derek Smith and vibraharpist Phil Kraus.

== Personal life and death ==
Light married Mary Danis, who acted on stage and sang on recordings and on radio. They had two daughters.

Light retired from music entirely in 1974. He died on July 31, 1978, at Mount Sinai Hospital in New York City, aged 71.

== Legacy ==
Light released 25 albums over 12 years (1959–71), with two of them reaching number one on the U.S. Billboard album chart. He holds the record for having the most charting LPs without having a Top 40 single, as reported by Casey Kasem on the American Top 40 broadcast of 14 October 1978.

Events coinciding with Light's birthday near his birthplace of northeastern Ohio have occurred since the late 1990s. The most recent was 2014's Enoch Light Birthday Memorial Go-Go Happening, which featured bands performing Light's work and multimedia installations remixing the distinctive Command Records album cover designs.

== Discography ==
Big Band Hits of the 30s (Project 3, PR-5049) [LP-1 / 13 tracks]

- Begin The Beguine – Artie Shaw version
- A String of Pearls – Glenn Miller version
- I'm Gettin' Sentimental Over You – Tommy Dorsey version
- We'll Git It! – Tommy Dorsey version
- Woodchopper's Ball – Woody Herman version
- One O'Clock Jump – Count Basie version
- Moonlight Serenade – Glenn Miller version
- Let's Dance – Benny Goodman version
- In The Mood – Glenn Miller version
- Ciribiribin – Harry James version
- Snowfall – Claude Thornhill version
- South Rampart Street Parade – Bob Crosby version
- Take The "A" Train – Duke Ellington version

Big Band Hits of the 30s, Vol. 2 (Project 3, PR-5089) [LP-2 / 12 tracks]

- Stardust – Benny Goodman version
- American Patrol – Glenn Miller version
- Sugar Blues – Clyde McCoy version
- Solitude – Duke Ellington version
- King Porter Stomp – Benny Goodman version
- What Is This Thing Called Love? – Artie Shaw version
- Bugle Call Rag – Benny Goodman version
- Smoke Rings – Casa Loma Orchestra version
- Softly, As in a Morning Sunrise – Artie Shaw version
- Boogie Woogie – Tommy Dorsey version
- Caravan – Duke Ellington version
- Little Brown Jug – Glenn Miller version

Big Band Hits of the 30s and 40s (Project 3, PR-5056) [LP-3 / 13 tracks; CD re-issue = 12 tracks]

- Cherokee – Charlie Barnet version
- April in Paris – Count Basie version
- I Can't Get Started – Bunny Berigan version
- Jersey Bounce – Benny Goodman version
- Sing, Sing, Sing (Part 1)* – Benny Goodman version
- Sing, Sing, Sing (Part 2)* – Benny Goodman version
- Marie – Tommy Dorsey version
- I'll Never Smile Again – Tommy Dorsey version
- Don't Get Around Much Anymore – Duke Ellington version
- Moonlight Sonata – Glenn Miller version
- Flying Home – Lionel Hampton version
- Tuxedo Junction – Glenn Miller version
- Four Brothers – Woody Herman version

(*) These two tracks were merged into one continuous track on CD re-issues.

Big Band Hits of the 40s and 50s (Project 3, PR-5076) [LP-4 / 12 tracks]

- Chattanooga Choo Choo – Glenn Miller version
- You Made Me Love You – Harry James version
- Satin Doll – Duke Ellington version
- On a Slow Boat to China – Kay Kyser version
- Cherry Pink And Apple Blossom White – Prez Prado version
- Pennsylvania 6-5000 – Glenn Miller version
- Song of India – Tommy Dorsey version
- Sentimental Journey – Les Brown version
- Don't Be That Way – Benny Goodman version
- Heartaches – Ted Weems version
- Sunrise Serenade – Glenn Miller version
- Stompin' At The Savoy – Benny Goodman version

LP-1 and -4 and LP-2 and -3 were reissued as two double album compilation LPs, but the various compilation double-album releases of LP-2 and -3 are missing two tracks that originally appeared on LP-3.
