= Bobby Byrne (musician) =

American musician

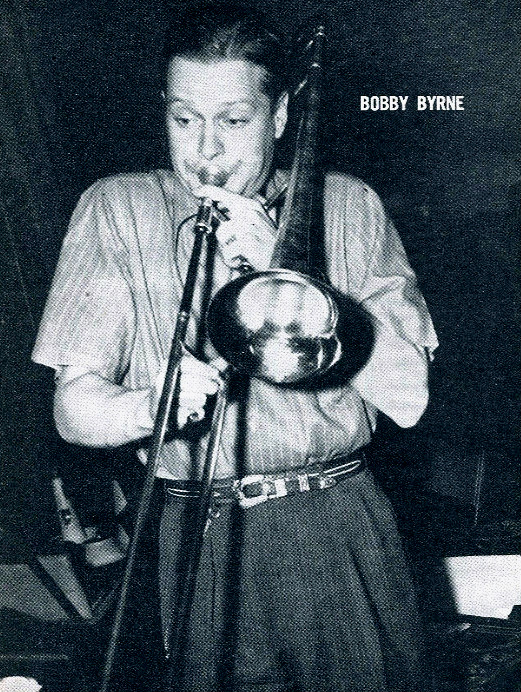
- Byrne in 1946

Background information
- Born: Robert Byrne; May 13, 1918; Columbus, Ohio, U.S.
- Died: November 25, 2006 (aged 88) Irvine, California, U.S.
- Genres: Jazz, Big band
- Occupations: Bandleader, trombonist, arranger
- Instrument: Trombone
- Years active: 1930s–1960s
- Labels: Decca, Cosmo Records, Top Rank Records, Command Records
- Formerly of: The Dorsey Brothers, Jimmy Dorsey, Steve Allen

Robert Byrne (/bɜːrn/; May 13, 1918 – November 25, 2006) was an American bandleader, trombonist, and music executive. His big band was well regarded. He flew aircraft in World War II, and later became a musical producer for television and albums credited to other artists.

== Biography ==
=== Early life and career ===
Byrne was born on May 13, 1918, on a farm near Columbus, Ohio, to Clarence Byrne and his wife. Both of his parents were musicians; his mother was a concert pianist before marriage and, at the time of Byrne's birth, his father was in France with the U.S. Army band. When Byrne was one, the family moved to Detroit so his father could take a position at Cass Technical High School, where he became a music teacher of high repute. Byrne was instructed musically at home by his parents from an early age, as well as at Cass Technical, which he later attended as a student. His father taught him musical technique with a mixture of tough criticism and high praise. In addition to trombone and harp, he studied piano, piccolo/flute, cello, and percussion. At one point, the senior Byrne invited Tommy Dorsey to hear the school's band, which was led by his son. Dorsey was impressed, and invited the younger Byrne to meet his brother Jimmy and hear the Dorsey Brothers band perform. He then asked Byrne to accompany the band to hear them play their next one-night stand. While there, he asked Byrne to sit in with the band for several minutes during the performance, taking Tommy's chair. Both Dorseys were impressed by his performance.

After an argument, the Dorsey Brothers ceased to speak to each other on May 30, 1935, resulting in Tommy refusing to play with the band. Their manager called in several replacements for the crucial trombone part, however, due to either personal or professional reasons, they all declined. The next offer was made to a sixteen-year-old Byrne, at 75 dollars a week. His mother instantly drove him (with a harp in addition to his three trombones) to the Glen Island Casino, where the orchestra was under contract to play for several months. Taking over Tommy's charts, Byrne was a success. Because of contractual obligations, Tommy returned to play with the orchestra, and Byrne was relegated to offstage. In the meantime, he learned from watching Tommy Dorsey perform. Escaping his contract, Tommy left the band permanently in September. When the Dorsey Brothers split, Byrne joined Jimmy's outfit, and took Tommy Dorsey's place leading the trombone section. By August, Byrne had recorded his first solo with the band on their hit single "From the Top of Your Head to the Tip of Your Toes". He married his first wife, Pat, in March 1939, two months after having met her in Dallas, Texas.

=== As bandleader and the war years ===
In November 1939, he formed his own band, based out of Detroit, with the assistance of manager Tommy Rockwell and the backing of Jimmy Dorsey, for whom he continued to record until at least April 1940. After signing contracts with Decca Records and the Glen Island Casino, Byrne's career as a bandleader appeared to be off to a positive start. In July 1940, he suffered an attack of appendicitis. He conspired to keep news of his ailment from his father, however Glenn Miller found out about his illness and relayed the news home. Byrne was able to delay surgery until fall of that year. His theme, "Meditation at Moonlight", was composed expressly for him by Peter de Rose and Mitchell Parish. After World War II began, Byrne struggled to keep his band going, constantly needing to replace band members lost to the draft. In 1943, while touring Florida, he joined the Army Air Corps. His band continued under Jack Jenney until he also joined the military several months later.

Byrne left the army in 1945 and began recording for the Cosmo label. He formed another band in 1949, featuring woodwind and French horn tone colorings. Bill Simon liked the sophisticated aural shadings, but felt they were not suited to many of the venues where the band performed. At this point Byrne signed with Mercury Records and became musical director for the ABC Television show Club Seven. He re-built his band yet again in 1950, eliminating woodwinds and focusing on brass and saxes, not to mention his occasional harp solo. This band included his brother Don and a sax section led by Larry Elgart. Critic Bill Simon considered this ensemble to be an improvement over Byrne's previous one. He applauded the improvements in singing and in the rhythmic numbers, while noticing the improved attendance at Byrne's performances.

=== Later life and career ===
Bobby married Catherine Migliori in 1951. They had three daughters together, Barbara, Kathleen and Eileen. Bobby met Catherine at the Paramount Theater in New York City in 1950. While Bobby was on stage performing, he noticed Catherine sitting in the audience. He knew he had to meet her and went out of his way to do just that. Soon after that meeting, they started dating and then married. Their marriage lasted 24 years.

Finding the big-band scene in decline, Byrne disbanded his outfit to concentrate on recording studio work, and on radio and television. In 1953, he became the musical director for WNBT-TV, which included providing music with a Dixieland band for Steve Allen's late-night show, originally called The Knickerbocker Beer Show. When NBC decided to add Allen's show to their network lineup as Tonight Starring Steve Allen, Skitch Henderson was asked to replace Byrne as the leader of the Tonight Show band. Henderson felt badly for Byrne, however band member Doc Severinsen felt that the type of music demanded by the show did not fit Byrne's style. In 1956, Byrne recorded three sessions with Cannonball Adderley, which appeared on the album In the Land of Hi-Fi with Julian Cannonball Adderley. In 1961, he joined Enoch Light's Grand Award Records in the A&R department. Byrne became a Command Records executive in the 1960s.

In the late 1960s, Byrne recorded two vinyl albums for the Evolution Records label. The second album was called Shades Of Brass and was released in 1969. It is notable for its inclusion of the Moog synthesizer and for its up tempo instrumental title track "Shades of Brass". It was released as a single in the U.S and was used by ABC as its main theme from 1969 to 1973.

Byrne left music in the early 1970s to pursue other business opportunities.

=== Death ===
Byrne died on November 25, 2006, in Irvine, California at the age of 88. His wife, Marilyn, said he had suffered a stroke and had been suffering from Alzheimer's disease.

== Style ==
Byrne closely modelled his playing after Tommy Dorsey. In the Jimmy Dorsey outfit, Byrne was comfortable playing either sweet or hot. His jazz solos were considered ahead of their time by Gunther Schuller, and Bill Simon considered his embellishments on slow numbers to be "breathtaking". He was an extreme perfectionist, which was sometimes given as the reason why his 1940s band was never very successful. He overworked himself and his band, even after suffering appendicitis in 1940. A 1942 review praised his "clean, solid swing" but found his song introductions to be too lengthy. Although known for his perfectionism, he was also recognised as being very affable.

== Discography ==
=== Albums ===
- Bobby Byrne Plays Great Themes. (1958, Grand Award)
- Bobby Byrne and the Alumni Orchestra. (1959, Top Rank 35-028)
- The Jazzbone's Connected to the Trombone. (1959, Grand Award)
- Tribute to the Dorseys. (Command 33-382)
- 1966-Magnificent Movie Themes. (1966, Command 894)
- Sound in the Eighth Dimension. (1968, Command)
- Shades of Brass. (1969, Evolution)

=== Singles ===
Year	Title	Peak chart positions	B-side	Issued on
1939	"Speaking of Heaven"	-	"Make With the Kisses"	Decca 2815
1939	"If It Wasn't for the Moon"	-	"One Cigarette for Two"	Decca 2956
1939	"Can't We Be Friends"	-	"Two Little Doodle Bugs"	Decca 2956
1940	"Easy Does It"	27	"How Can You Pretend"	Decca 3020
1940	"Way Back in 1939 A.D."	-	"Busy as a Bee"	Decca 3028
1940	"How Many Times"	-	"Barnyard Cakewalk"	Decca 3108
1940	"If I Could Be the Dummy on Your Knee"	-	"Slow Freight"	Decca 3123
1940	"Thinking of You"	-	"'Deed I Do"	Decca 3170
1940	"When the Swallows Come Back to Capistrano"	-	"Stop Pretending"	Decca 3278
1940	"Can't Get Indiana Off My Mind"	-	"Orchids for Remembrance"	Decca 3279
1940	"That's for Me"	-	"Only Forever"	Decca 3313
1940	"Love Lies"	-	"Trade Winds"	Decca 3325
1940	"Maybe"	18	One Look at You	Decca 3392
1940	"Take Care (of You for Me)"	-	"The Right Time"	Decca 3398
1940	"Danny Boy"	-	"Maria Elena"	Decca 3442
1941	"You Walk By"	22	"Chapel in the Valley"	Decca 3613
1941	"Brazilian Nuts"	-	"Bobby's Trombone Blues"	Decca 3648
1941	"Music Makers"	-	"When You and I Were Young, Maggie"	Decca 3739
1941	"I Found a Million Dollar Baby"	-	"On the Beach at Waikiki"	Decca 3771
1941	"Nighty Night"	-	"Do I Worry"	Decca 3773
1941	"These Things You Left Me"	-	"Two Hearts That Pass in the Night"	Decca 3774
1941	"You Started Something"	-	"Down, Down, Down"	Decca 3891
1941	"More Than Once"	-	"If It's True"	Decca 3898
1941	"What Word Is Sweeter Than Sweetheart?"	-	"I Guess I'll Have to Dream the Rest"	Decca 3906
1941	"It's You Again"	-	"I Went Out of My Way"	Decca 3969
1942	"I'll Pray for You"	-	"Blue Tahitian Moon"	Decca 4302
1942	"The Angelus Rings Again"	-	"Now and Forever"	Decca 4306
1946	"Watta Ya Gonna Do?"	-	"Ridin' on a Summer Afternoon"	Cosmo 488
1946	"Hey Bobby!"	-	"Hymn to the Sun"	Cosmo 492
1946	"This Is Always"	-	"Linger in My Arms a Little Longer"	Cosmo 496
1946	"Take Me Back to Little Rock"	-	"So Beats My Heart for You"	Cosmo 501
1946	"Take it Slow, Taste the Vanilla"	-	"You Keep Coming Back Like a Song"	Cosmo 503

=== Other appearances ===
With the Henri René Orchestra

- RCA Victor Presents Eartha Kitt (RCA, 1953)
- That Bad Eartha (EP) (RCA, 1954)
- Down To Eartha (RCA, 1955)
- That Bad Eartha (LP) (RCA, 1956)
- Thursday's Child (RCA, 1957)

With Cootie Williams

- Cootie Williams in Hi-Fi (RCA Victor, 1958)
