= Jimmy Maxwell (trumpeter) =

American jazz musician

Jimmy Maxwell (January 9, 1917 – July 20, 2002) was an American swing jazz trumpeter.

Maxwell played cornet from an early age, studying with Herbert L. Clarke in the early 1930s. He played with Gil Evans (1933–34), Jimmy Dorsey (1936), Maxine Sullivan, and Skinnay Ennis before joining Benny Goodman's band from 1939 to 1943. He also played with Goodman later in life, including on his tour of the Soviet Union in 1962. He worked as a studio musician for NBC from 1943, playing on The Perry Como Show (1945–63), The Patti Page Show, the Pat Boone Show, and The Tonight Show (1963–73). He played first trumpet on hundreds of recordings and commercials from 1950 to 1980. In addition, he worked as a sideman for, among others, Woody Herman (1958), Count Basie, Duke Ellington (1973), Oliver Nelson, Gerry Mulligan, Maynard Ferguson, Quincy Jones (1964), the New York Jazz Repertory Company, and Chuck Israels's National Jazz Ensemble.

Of his sideman jobs, he is cited as having played trumpet in the Henri René orchestra for Eartha Kitt's first five albums; RCA Victor Presents Eartha Kitt (1953), That Bad Eartha (EP) (1954), Down To Eartha (1955), That Bad Eartha (LP) (1956), and Thursday's Child (1957), all with RCA Victor. Maxwell played the trumpet solo theme for the soundtrack of The Godfather. He also taught from the late 1970s onwards.

Later in life Maxwell worked with Dixieland jazz and swing ensembles such as Dick Sudhalter's New California Ramblers. He led one session for Circle Records in 1977. He retired from recording and performing later in life but still taught music until 2001, and died the next year.

== Discography ==
With Cannonball Adderley

- Domination (Capitol, 1965)

With Manny Albam

- Brass on Fire (Sold State, 1966)

With Ruth Brown

- Ruth Brown '65 (Mainstream, 1965)

With Al Cohn

- Son of Drum Suite (RCA Victor, 1960)
- Jazz Mission to Moscow (Colpix, 1962)

With Bobby Hackett

- Creole Cookin' (Verve, 1967)

With J. J. Johnson

- J.J.! (RCA Victor, 1964)

With Quincy Jones

- The Great Wide World of Quincy Jones (Mercury, 1959)
- Quincy Jones Explores the Music of Henry Mancini (Mercury, 1964)

With Carmen McRae

- Something to Swing About (Kapp, 1959)

With Oliver Nelson

- Full Nelson (Verve, 1963)
- Oliver Edward Nelson in London with Oily Rags (Flying Dutchman, 1974)

With Charlie Parker

- Big Band (Clef, 1954)

With Nelson Riddle

- Phil Silvers and Swinging Brass (Columbia, 1957)

With Clark Terry

- Mother ! Mother ! (Pablo, 1979)
