= List of Kim Kardashian performances =

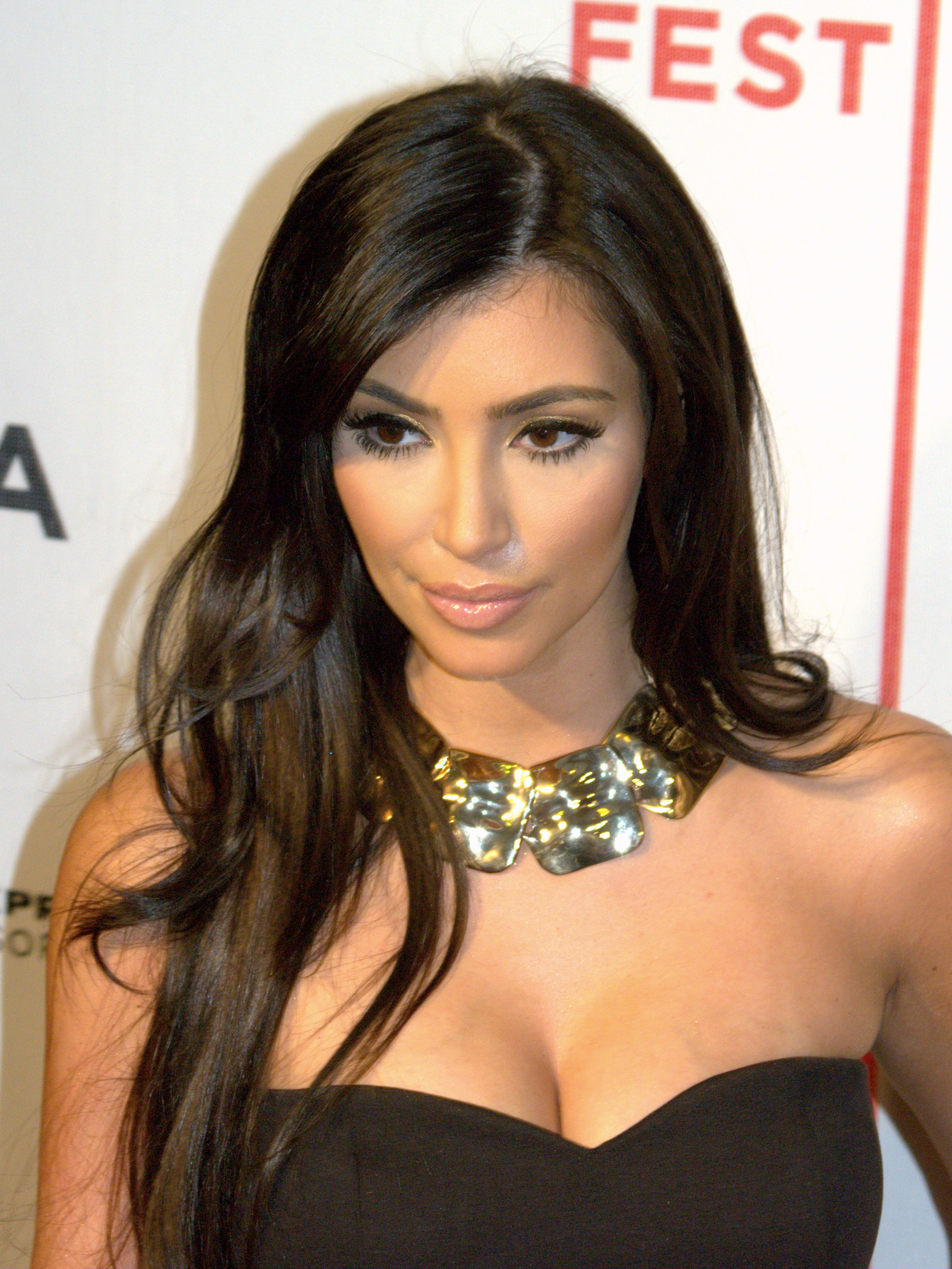
Kardashian at the 2009 Tribeca Film Festival

The following is the complete list of performances by American media personality Kim Kardashian.

== Film ==
Year	Title	Role	Notes	Ref.
2007	Kim Kardashian, Superstar	Herself	Pornographic film	
2008	Disaster Movie	Lisa Taylor		
2009	Kim Kardashian: Fit in Your Jeans by Friday	Herself	Three-part fitness DVD collection	
2009	Deep in the Valley	Summa Eve		
2013	Temptation: Confessions of a Marriage Counselor	Ava		
2016	Zoolander: Super Model	Herself (voice)		
2018	Ocean's 8	Herself		
2020	This Is Paris	Herself	Documentary	
2021	The First Step	Herself	Documentary	
2021	Paw Patrol: The Movie	Delores (voice)		
2023	Paw Patrol: The Mighty Movie	Delores (voice)		
2027	The Fifth Wheel		Also producer	

== Television ==
=== As herself ===
Year	Title	Notes	Ref.
2005	Princes of Malibu	Pilot episode	
2006	The Simple Life	3 episodes	
2007	The Hills	Deleted scene (aired on the 10th anniversary special)	
2007–2021	Keeping Up with the Kardashians	Main role Also executive producer	
2008	WrestleMania XXIV	Hostess	
2008–2018	Celebrity Family Feud	Contestant: 2 episodes	
2008	Dancing with the Stars	Season 7; Contestant: 6 episodes	
2009–2013	Kourtney and Kim Take Miami	Main role: 19 episodes	
2009–2011	America's Next Top Model	Guest star: 2 episodes	
2010	La La's Full Court Wedding	Episode: "Bachelorette Party"	
2010	The Apprentice	Episode: "Fragrant Disregard"	
2010	The Spin Crowd	Cameo appearances Also executive producer	
2011	H8R	Episode: "Kim Kardashian"	
2011	Project Runway	Guest judge; Episode: "Go Big or Go Home"	
2011	Khloé & Lamar	3 episodes	
2011–2012	Kourtney and Kim Take New York	Main role: 18 episodes	
2012	Punk'd	Episode: "Ashton Kutcher"	
2012	Oprah Prime	Two-week special: "The Kardashians"	
2012	Last Man Standing	Episode: "Tree of Strife"	
2013	Betty White's Off Their Rockers	Episode: "Kim Kardashian"	
2014	Kourtney and Khloé Take The Hamptons	3 episodes	
2014	2 Broke Girls	Episode: "And the Reality Problem"	
2014	Celebrities Undercover	Episode: "Wendy Williams & Kim Kardashian"	
2015	I Am Cait	7 episodes	
2015	Dash Dolls	Recurring role Also executive producer	
2015	Australia's Next Top Model	1 episode	
2016	Kocktails with Khloé	Episode: "Kimye and Legends"	
2016	The Hills: That Was Then, This Is Now	Anniversary special	
2017	Big Fan	Contestant; Episode: "Kim Kardashian West"	
2018	You Kiddin' Me	Episode: "Kim Kardashian West & Sisters Prank Kris Jenner"; Also executive producer	
2018	A Legendary Christmas with John and Chrissy	Christmas special	
2019–2020	My Next Guest Needs No Introduction with David Letterman	Episode: "Kanye West" (uncredited); Episode: "Kim Kardashian West"	
2020	Kim Kardashian West: The Justice Project	Documentary; Also executive producer	
2021	Martha Gets Down and Dirty	Episode:"Keeping Up With Martha's Trees"	
2021	Cooking with Paris	Episode: "Breakfast in the Clouds"	
2022–present	The Kardashians	Main role Also executive producer	
2022	Gutsy	Episode: TBA	
2024	In Vogue: The 90s	Mini-series; 4 episodes	
2024	Elizabeth Taylor: Rebel Superstar	Mini-series; 3 episodes Also executive producer	

=== As an actress ===
Year	Title	Role	Notes	Ref.
2009	Alligator Boots	Herself / Princess Leia	TV Pilot	
2009	Brothers	Herself	Episode: "Meet Mike Trainor/Assistant Coach"	
2009	CSI: NY	Debbie Fallon	Episode: "Second Chances"	
2009	Beyond the Break	Elle	4 episodes	
2009	How I Met Your Mother	Herself	Episode: "Benefits"	
2010	90210	Herself	Episode: "Senior Year, Baby"	
2012	Drop Dead Diva	Nikki LePree	4 episodes	
2012	Last Man Standing	Herself	Episode: "Tree of Strife"	
2012	30 Rock	Herself	Episode: "Live from Studio 6H"	
2014	American Dad!	Qurchhhh / Herself (voice)	Episode: "Blagsnarst, a Love Story"	
2014	2 Broke Girls	Herself	Episode: "And the Reality Problem"	
2021	Saturday Night Live	Host / Herself	Episode: "Kim Kardashian West/Halsey"	
2023–2024	American Horror Story: Delicate	Siobhan Corbyn	Main role	
2025–present	All's Fair	Allura Grant	Main role Also executive producer	

=== As executive producer ===
Year	Title	Ref.
2010	The Spin Crowd	
2015–2021	Keeping Up with the Kardashians	
2015	Dash Dolls	
2016	Rob & Chyna	
2018	You Kiddin' Me	
2018	Glam Masters	
2020	Kim Kardashian West: The Justice Project	
2022–present	The Kardashians	
2025	All's Fair	

== Music videos ==
Year	Title	Artist(s)	Director(s)	Ref.
1996	"All About U"	2Pac	Marlene Rhein and Rob Johnson	
2004	"Dip It Low"	Christina Milian	Matthew Rolston	
2007	"Thnks fr th Mmrs"	Fall Out Boy	Alan Ferguson	
2011	"Jam (Turn It Up)"	Herself	Hype Williams	
2012	"Come on a Cone"	Nicki Minaj	Grizz Lee	
2013	"Bound 2"	Kanye West	Nick Knight	
2016	"M.I.L.F. $"	Fergie	Colin Tilley	
2016	"Wolves"	Kanye West	Steven Klein	
2019	"B.F.A. (Best Friend's Ass)"	Dimitri Vegas & Like Mike featuring Paris Hilton	Charlotte Rutherford	
2020	"Feel Me"	Tyga featuring Kanye West	Eli Russell Linnetz	
2021	"Come to Life"	Kanye West	Kanye West and Nico Ballesteros	
2024	"Santa Baby"	Herself	Nadia Lee Cohen and Charlie Denis	

== Video games ==
Year	Title	Role	Ref.
2014	Kim Kardashian: Hollywood	Herself	
2025	Fortnite	Herself	Likeness; 2 outfits

== Discography ==
List of singles, with selected chart positions
Title	Year	Peak chart positions		Album
Title	Year	US Bub.	US Heat.	Album
"Jam (Turn It Up)"	2011	17	21	Non-album singles
"Santa Baby"	2024	—	—	Non-album singles
"—" denotes releases that did not chart or were not released in that territory.
