= Jack Lesberg =

American jazz double-bassist (1920–2005)

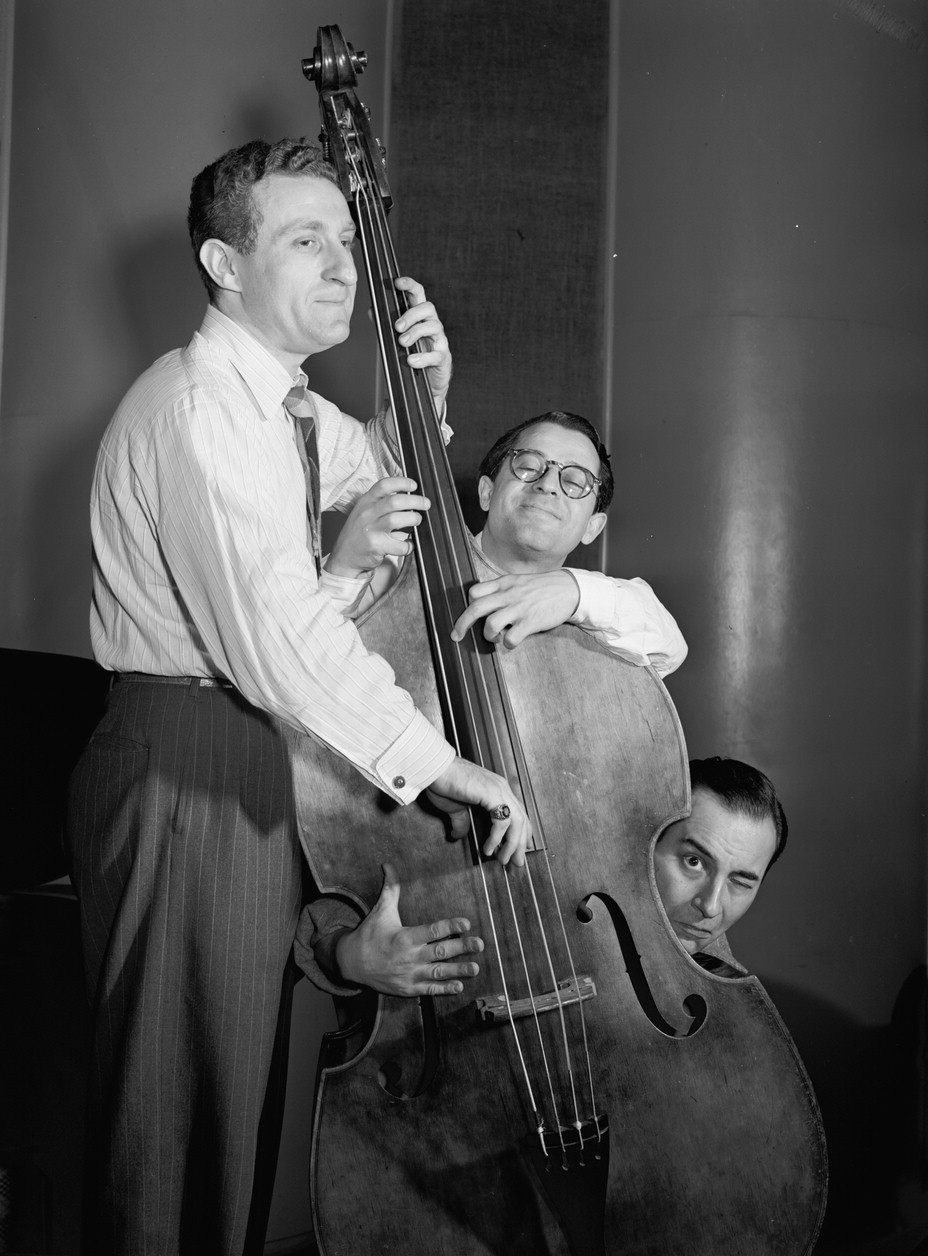
- Jack Lesberg, Max Kaminsky, and Peanuts Hucko, Eddie Condon's, New York, N.Y., ca. May 1947. Image: Gottlieb

Background information
- Born: February 14, 1920; Boston, Massachusetts, U.S.
- Died: September 17, 2005 (aged 85) Englewood, New Jersey, U.S.
- Genres: Swing, big band
- Occupation: Musician
- Instrument: Double bass

Jack Lesberg (February 14, 1920 – September 17, 2005) was an American jazz double-bassist.

Lesberg performed with many famous jazz musicians, including Louis Armstrong, Earl Hines, Jack Teagarden, Sarah Vaughan and Benny Goodman, with whom he went on several international tours. He also performed in the New York City Symphony under Leonard Bernstein in the 1940s.

A native of Boston, Massachusetts, United States, Lesberg played at the Cocoanut Grove on November 28, 1942, when 492 people lost their lives in a fire. His escape was memorialized by fellow bassist Charles Mingus in an unpublished section of Mingus's autobiography Beneath the Underdog; this passage was read by rapper Chuck D. on the Mingus tribute album, Weird Nightmare.

Lesberg continued to tour in the 1980s and was interviewed for KCEA radio in 1984, following a performance in Menlo Park, California. During the taped interview he spoke of the many bands and performers he worked with and expressed his feelings that he felt blessed to be a musician.

He died of Alzheimer's in Englewood, New Jersey at the age of 85.

== Discography ==
As co-leader

- We've Got Rhythm/Live at Hanratty's (Chaz Jazz, 1981)
- No Amps Allowed (Chiaroscuro)

As sideman

- Dixieland Jazz (Waldorf, 1957)
- Tribute to Louis Armstrong (Jugoton, 1985)
- Tribute to Louis Armstrong Vol. 2 (Jugoton, 1989)
- The Music of Lil Hardin Armstrong (Chiaroscuro, 1988)

With George Barnes

- Guitar in Velvet (Grand Award, 1957)
- Country Jazz (Colortone, 1957)
- Movin' Easy (Mercury, 1959)
- Guitar Galaxies (Mercury, 1960)
- Guitars Galore (Mercury, 1961)

With Tony Bennett

- I've Gotta Be Me (Columbia, 1969)

With Ruth Brown

- Ruth Brown (Atlantic, 1957)

With Eddie Condon

- In Japan (Chiaroscuro, 1964)

With Urbie Green

- All About Urbie Green and His Big Band (ABC-Paramount, 1956)

With Coleman Hawkins

- The Hawk in Hi Fi (RCA Victor, 1956)

With Johnny Hodges

- Blue Rabbit (Verve, 1964)

With John Lennon

- Imagine (Apple Records, 1971)

With the Henri René Orchestra

- RCA Victor Presents Eartha Kitt (RCA, 1953)
- That Bad Eartha (EP) (RCA, 1954)
- Down To Eartha (RCA, 1955)
- That Bad Eartha (LP) (RCA, 1956)
- Thursday's Child (RCA, 1957)

With Ralph Sutton & Ruby Braff

- R & R (Chiaroscuro, 1994)
