= Johnny Guarnieri =

American jazz pianist

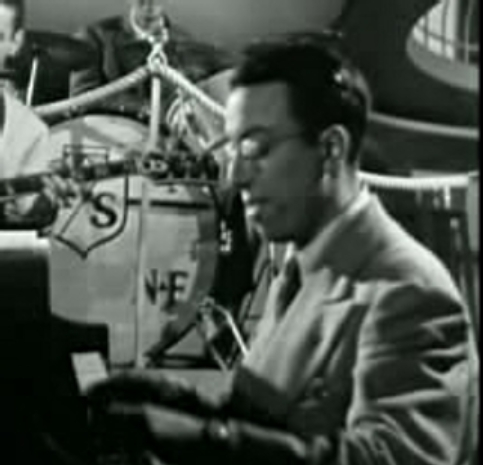
- Guarnieri in Second Chorus, 1940

Background information
- Born: John Albert Guarnieri; March 23, 1917; New York City, New York, U.S.
- Died: January 7, 1985 (aged 67) Livingston, New Jersey, U.S.
- Genres: Jazz; swing
- Occupation: Musician
- Instrument: Piano
- Labels: Savoy; Majestic; RCA

John Albert Guarnieri (March 23, 1917 – January 7, 1985) was an American jazz and stride pianist, born in New York City.

== Career ==
Guarnieri joined the George Hall orchestra in 1937. He is possibly best known for his big band stints with Benny Goodman in 1939 and with Artie Shaw in 1940. Guarnieri is also noted for his embellishment and juxtaposition of jazz with classical piano, such as Scarlatti and Beethoven.

Throughout the 1940s, Guarnieri was active as a sideman, recording with artists such as Charlie Christian, Cozy Cole, Ike Quebec, Charlie Kennedy, Hank D'Amico and Ben Webster. He also led his own group called the "Johnny Guarnieri Swing Men" and recorded with them on the Savoy label, a group that included Lester Young, Hank D'Amico, Billy Butterfield and Cozy Cole. He also led a trio in the 1940s composed of himself, Slam Stewart, and Sammy Weiss, recording again for Savoy. During the 1940s, he also recorded for the short-lived Majestic label, playing solo piano and with his trio.

In the 1940s, he also played harpsichord in the Gramercy Five, a small band led by Artie Shaw; his solos were the first examples of jazz recorded on the instrument.

In 1946, Guarnieri's trio was broadcast twice by the BBC Home Service in the UK in a short series highlighting American, British and French jazz artists dubbed as 'Kings of Jazz'. The 18 January and 29 March episodes featured his trio with Guarnieri (piano), Slam Stewart (bass), and Sidney Catlett (drums), and was introduced by Alistair Cooke.

In 1949, Guarnieri recorded an album with June Christy entitled June Christy & The Johnny Guarnieri Quintet. In his later years, Guarnieri shifted more toward jazz education. In commemoration of his reputation as a teacher, Guarnieri's students financed a label for him called "Taz Jazz Records". In the 1970s, Guarnieri recorded numerous albums on his new label, and until 1982 worked at the "Tail o' the Cock" restaurant bar in Studio City, California. In the early 1980s, Guarnieri recorded Johnny Guarnieri Plays Duke Ellington on a Bösendorfer Grand "SE" player piano, for the Live-Performance Jazz Series.

== Death ==
Guarnieri was based in Los Angeles later in his life, but traveled to the East Coast to play a concert in January 1985. He played at the Vineyard Theatre at East 26th Street in New York City on January 6, but had to stop at the intermission because of dizziness. He went to a friend's house to rest, but was admitted to St Barnabas hospital in Livingston, New Jersey the following day, where he died following a heart attack.

== Personal life ==
He was survived by his wife, Jeanne, six children, and 18 grandchildren.

== Select discography ==
- Makin' Whoopee (Dobre)

With Cozy Cole

- Concerto for Cozy (Savoy, 1944)

With Tony Mottola, Cozy Cole and Bob Haggart

- An Hour of Modern Piano Rhythms (Royale, 1953)

With the Henri René Orchestra

- RCA Victor Presents Eartha Kitt (RCA, 1953)
- That Bad Eartha (EP) (RCA, 1954)
- Down to Eartha (RCA, 1955)
- That Bad Eartha (LP) (RCA, 1956)
- Thursday's Child (RCA, 1957)

With Ben Webster

- "Honeysuckle Rose" b/w "Kat's Fur" (Savoy, 1944 )

With Lester Young (Keynote, 1943)

- "Sometimes I'm Happy"
- "Just You, Just Me"
- "I Never Knew"
- "Afternoon of a Basie-ite"

With Trio

- Makin' Whoopee (Dobre Records DR1017, 1978)
