= Tony Terran =

American trumpet player (1926–2017)

Background information
- Born: May 30, 1926; Buffalo, New York, U.S.
- Died: March 20, 2017 (aged 90) Los Angeles, California, U.S.
- Occupation: Musician
- Instrument: Trumpet
- Website: tonyterran.com

Anthony Terran (May 30, 1926 – March 20, 2017) was an American trumpet player and session musician. He was part of the Wrecking Crew, a group of largely uncredited session musicians in Los Angeles, California, who helped famous artists record hit records in the 1960s.

== Career ==
Terran was in high school when he started working on live radio shows in Buffalo, New York. In 1944, he arrived in Los Angeles after touring with Horace Heidt. In 1945, he began working with Bob Hope, and then with Desi Arnaz in 1946. Terran was the last surviving member of the Desi Arnaz Orchestra from the I Love Lucy television show.

Terran performed and recorded with many artists including the Jackson 5, the 5th Dimension, the Mamas & the Papas, the Beach Boys, Harry Nilsson, the Bee Gees, Ray Charles, Neil Diamond, Chicago, Nat King Cole, Natalie Cole, Commodores, Perry Como, Bob Dylan, Ella Fitzgerald, Benny Goodman, Tony Bennett, Eartha Kitt, Peggy Lee, Madonna (I'm Breathless), Dean Martin, The Monkees, Elvis Presley, Bonnie Raitt (Takin' My Time), Linda Ronstadt, Diana Ross, Frank Sinatra, Sammy Davis Jr., Lou Rawls, Barbra Streisand, Baja Marimba Band, Tijuana Brass, the Carpenters, Tom Waits, Ricky Nelson, Glen Campbell and Eric Burdon and the Animals.

== Family ==
Terran had a son named Mark with singer/dancer Avalon Adele Kirkham. Tony and Avalon married the following year, at which time Tony became step-father to Avalon's daughter from a previous marriage, Aprile Lanza. The marriage produced another son David and daughters Eve and Jennifer; all the children were raised in the LDS faith. The couple divorced in 1976, and Avalon died in 1981. Daughter Jennifer Terran became a singer-songwriter and pianist based in Southern California.

== Mentor ==
Terran was known for mentoring new trumpet players and providing opportunities for watching his recording sessions and learning the business.

== Selected discography ==
=== As featured artist ===
- The Song's Been Sung (Imperial, 1966)

=== As sideman ===
with Chet Baker

- Blood, Chet and Tears (Verve, 1970)

with the Henri René Orchestra

- RCA Victor Presents Eartha Kitt (RCA, 1953)
- That Bad Eartha (EP) (RCA, 1954)
- Down To Eartha (RCA, 1955)
- That Bad Eartha (LP) (RCA, 1956)
- Thursday's Child (RCA, 1957)

with Lalo Schifrin

- Music from Mission: Impossible (Dot, 1967)
- There's a Whole Lalo Schifrin Goin' On (Dot, 1968)
- Bullitt (soundtrack) (Warner Bros., 1968)
- Enter the Dragon (soundtrack) (Warner Bros., 1973)
