= Charles Magnante =

American piano-accordionist, arranger, composer, author

- Born: December 7, 1905; New York City, New York, U.S.
- Died: December 30, 1986 (aged 81) Westchester County, New York, U.S.
- Genres: Easy listening - Boogie-Woogie - Jazz - Light Classical
- Occupations: Musician, Arranger, Composer, Author, Educator
- Instrument: Accordion
- Labels: Columbia; Grand Award; Command

Charles Magnante (December 7, 1905 – December 30, 1986) was an American piano-accordionist, arranger, composer, author and educator. His artistry helped raise the image of the accordion from an instrument considered suitable only for folk music to an instrument accepted in many music genres.

== Background ==
Magnante's father was a well-known amateur musician, and performed at Italian wedding receptions and other dance venues. Charles sang along with his father beginning at the age of five years, and at the age of seven, he secretly learned to play his father's accordion. At the age of sixteen his reputation as an accordionist had grown so much he was receiving many offers to join tours with stage bands, which he declined due to his continuing musical studies.

== Career ==
Charles Magnante started his professional career playing in Italian restaurants and on the Staten Island Ferry. However, he wanted to break free from the "'O sole mio" image of the stereotypical Italian-American accordionist which his audiences expected to hear. In the 1940s, he was the leader of a successful trio with guitarist Tony Mottola and organist George Wright, and played regularly on NBC radio broadcasts. He worked also as a sought-after studio musician.

At the peak of his career, he played 30 live radio broadcasts (including The Jack Berch Show) and eight studio sessions each week. He performed also as a solo concert musician, and once performed a solo concert at the Civic Stadium of Buffalo, New York for an audience of 40,000.

Magnante was one of the twelve founding members of the American Accordionists' Association (founded in 1938), and also served as this organization's president for three terms.

Magnante wrote method books for accordion players and numerous arrangements of contemporary popular standards, schlagers and classical pieces. Many of his arrangements can still be found in the standard repertoire of accordionists throughout the world. His most famous original composition is probably the novelty Accordiana. His arrangements and compositions stretch across a number of musical genres, including easy listening, jazz and boogie-woogie, and light classical pieces.

== Discography ==
Magnante was featured as accordion soloist on more than two dozen albums (many with studio orchestras), released by Columbia, Grand Award, Command Records, Decca Records, and other record labels.

Solo releases

Cook Records releases

- Accordion Pops Concert (Cook #1013)
- "His & Hers" (Cook #1014)

Hollywood release

- Accordiana - Charles Magnante & Mullen Sisters (Hollywood #LPH 131, 1958)

Columbia Records releases

- Accordiana (Columbia #C-53) [Set]
- Accordiana, Vol. II (Columbia #B-283)
- Accordiana, Vol. II (Columbia CL-6194)

Command Records releases

- Fiesta! (Command #RS 869 SD)
- Carnival (Command #RS 907 SD)
- Roman Accordion (Command #RS 852 SD)
- Romantic Accordion (Command #RS 888 SD)
- Accordion Bellicosity (Command #RSSD 971-2)

Grand Award Records releases

- Charles Magnante Plays the Accordion (Grand Award #AAS-707)
- Magnante…In Concert (Grand Award #GA 268 S)
- Polka Party (Grand Award #GA 33-323)
- Roman Spectacular (Grand Award #GA EP 2022)
- Roman Spectacular (Grand Award #GA 33-205)
- Roman Spectacular (Grand Award #GA 33-361)
- Roman Spectacular (Grand Award #GA 33-374)
- Roman Spectacular (Grand Award #GA 205 SD)
- Roman Spectacular (Grand Award #GA 233 SD)
- Roman Spectacular (Grand Award #GA 306 SD)
- Spanish Spectacular (Grand Award #GA 33-379)
- Spanish Spectacular (Grand Award #GA 212 SD)
- Roman Carnival (Grand Award #GA 33-429)
- Roman Carnival (Grand Award #GA 260 SD)
- Moods For Moderns (Grand Award #GA 33-413)
- Moods For Moderns (Grand Award #GA 245 SD)

Waldorf Music Hall Records releases

- Polka Party (Waldorf Music Hall #MH 45-155)
- Holiday in Paris (Waldorf Music Hall #MHK 33-1218)

Accordia Records release

- Accordion Variety Concert, Volume 1 (Accordia #V6490-10043)

Mercury Records releases

- Accordion Encores (Mercury #MCR 1001) [cassette]
- Virtuoso Accordion (Mercury #MCR 1000) [cassette]

Unknown record company

- 21 Favorites [cassette and book]
- (2003)

Live radio

- Boston Radio Interview WGBH FM (WGBH FM Radio) [cassette]

The Charlie Magnante Trio recordings (London 30012)

- The Letter I Forgot to Mail/Kemo Kimo - 1949, with Jack Berch (Regent 144)
- Bibbi-Di Bobba-Di Boo/Cinderella - 1950 with Jack Berch and The Mullen Sisters (London 20012)

Guest appearances

Magnante also appeared as guest accordionist with other artists, such as Marlene Dietrich.

- "Sonny Boy" - Annette Hanshaw (1928)
- "Lilli Marlene"/"Symphonie" - Marlene Dietrich (Decca #23456, 1945)

Other appearances

With Kenyon Hopkins, in his Orchestra and Chorus

- Cash On Delivery (Merrimac #751)

With the Henri René Orchestra

- RCA Victor Presents Eartha Kitt (RCA, 1953)
- That Bad Eartha (EP) (RCA, 1954)
- Down To Eartha (RCA, 1955)
- That Bad Eartha (LP) (RCA, 1956)
- Thursday's Child (RCA, 1957)

== Private life ==
Charles Magnante was married twice. He had a son and a daughter from his first marriage, from which he divorced. His second wife, Charlotte, was a professional musician, whom he met in Atlanta, Georgia. Charlotte Magnante died in 1997.

Magnante was an avid big game hunter; he wrote articles about his hunting trips which were published by hunting magazines.
