= Revisited (Eartha Kitt album) =

Studio album by Eartha Kitt
- Released: 1960
- Recorded: March and April 1960 at the Fine Studio, New York
- Genre: Vocal jazz
- Label: Kapp

Eartha Kitt chronology
The Fabulous Eartha (1959)	Revisited (1960)	Bad But Beautiful (1962)

Revisited is a 1960 studio album by American singer Eartha Kitt, her second album issued on the Kapp Records label. All songs had been previously recorded by Kitt, between 1953 and 1958, during her recording contract at RCA Victor. It was recorded in New York on March 31 and April 1, 1960, with Maurice Levine as musical director. The album was also released as a four track, 7-inch EP in the United Kingdom and France.

The complete album was re-issued on CD in 1994 as part of the Bear Family Records five CD boxset Eartha - Quake, which included a previously unreleased bonus track, "Johnny with the Gentle Hands", from the same recording session. The album was also released to CD by Hallmark Music & Entertainment in 2012 as a stand-alone album.

The album charted in the UK at #17 in February 1961.

== Track listing ==
=== 12" LP version ===
1. "(If I Love Ya, Then I Need Ya) I Wantcha Around" (Bob Merrill) - 2:25
2. "Uska Dara (A Turkish tale)" (Traditional) - 3:37
3. "Let's Do It" (Cole Porter) - 2:38
4. "Angelitos Negros" (Andrés Eloy Blanco, Manuel Alvarez Maciste) - 3:27
5. "Apres Moi" (Bernard Bennett) - 3:25
6. "C'est si bon" (Henri Betti, André Hornez) - 2:35
7. "Just an Old Fashioned Girl" (Marve Fisher) - 2:44
8. "April In Portugal" (Raul Ferrão, Jimmy Kennedy) - 2:35
9. "I Want to Be Evil" (Lester Judson, Raymond Taylor) - 2:57
10. "My Heart Belongs to Daddy" (Cole Porter) - 2:47
11. "Lilac Wine" (James Shelton) - 3:30
12. "Santa Baby" (Joan Javits, Philip Springer) - 2:47

Eartha - Quake CD bonus tracks

- "Johnny With the Gentle Hands" (Take 7) (George Siravo, Kermit Goell)
- "Johnny With the Gentle Hands" (Take 8) (George Siravo, Kermit Goell)

=== 7" EP version ===
1. "My Heart Belongs to Daddy" (Cole Porter) - 2:47
2. "I Wantcha Round" (Bob Merrill) - 2:25
3. "C'est Si Bon" (Henri Betti, André Hornez) - 2:35
4. "Angelitos Negros"(Andrés Eloy Blanco, Manuel Alvarez Maciste) - 3:27

== Personnel ==
Technical

- Maurice Levine – arranger and Musical Director

Performance

- Eartha Kitt – vocals

== Release history ==
Region	Date	Format	Label	Catalog No.	Ref.
Australia	1960	12-inch LP Vinyl (Stereo)	Kapp Records	PKS 6021	
Canada	1960	12-inch LP Vinyl (Stereo)	Kapp Records	KL-1192	
United States	1960	12-inch LP Vinyl (Mono)	Kapp Records	KL-1192	
United States	1960	12-inch LP Vinyl (Stereo)	Kapp Records	KS-3192	
United Kingdom	1960	12-inch LP Vinyl (Mono)	Kapp Records, London Records	HA-R 2296	
United Kingdom	1960	7-inch EP Vinyl	Kapp Records, London Records	RE-R 1266	
United Kingdom	1961	12-inch LP Vinyl (Stereo)	Kapp Records, London Records	SAH-R 6107	
Mexico	Unknown	12-inch LP Vinyl (Mono)	Kapp Records	KL-M 1192	
France	Unknown	12-inch LP Vinyl	Mode Disques	MDK 9416	
France	1963?	7-inch EP Vinyl	Kapp Records	KE-3017M	
United Kingdom	1963?	12-inch LP Vinyl (Stereo) [budget re-issue]	Kapp Records, Ace of Hearts Records	AHR 170	
United Kingdom	1969	12-inch LP Vinyl (Mono) [re-issue]	Coral Records	CP 102	
Netherlands	1970	12-inch LP Vinyl (as Stars of the Fifties)	MCA Records	5C 050-95432	
Germany	1970	12-inch LP Vinyl (as And Her Greatest Songs)	MCA Records	252 652-1	
Germany	June 28, 1994	CD compilation box set (as a part of Eartha-Quake)	Bear Family Records	BLCD15639 EI	
United Kingdom	January 1, 2012	CD	Hallmark Music & Entertainment	711042	
