= That Bad Eartha =

Studio album by Eartha Kitt
- Released: December 1953, 1954, 1956
- Recorded: March 1953 at The Manhattan Center, New York and October 1953 at RCA Victor Studio No. 2
- Genres: Vocal jazz; pop
- Length: 37:01
- Languages: English; French; Spanish; Turkish; Swahili
- Labels: RCA Victor (US); His Master's Voice (UK)
- Producers: Hugo Winterhalter; Joe Carlton

Eartha Kitt chronology
That Bad Eartha (1953)	Down to Eartha (1955)

Professional ratings
Review scores
Source	Rating
AllMusic	4/5 stars

That Bad Eartha is a twelve-song reconfiguration of material from American singer Eartha Kitt's first two eight-song, 10-inch albums issued by RCA Victor. It contains all eight songs from the 1953 album RCA Victor Presents Eartha Kitt. It repurposes the cover image and title, and four of the songs from Eartha's 1954 second 10-inch album, That Bad Eartha (10-inch, 8-song album). In this way, it could be considered an expansion of the first short-length album, supplementing it with packaging and selected songs from the second.

In May 1953, RCA Victor released the 10-inch vinyl album RCA Victor Presents Eartha Kitt, which reached No. 2 on the pop albums chart and featured 8 songs. The album was recorded in four sessions between March and October 1953 with Henri Rene and His Orchestra.

RCA released her second album, That Bad Eartha, in the 10″ popular format, in 1954. It was also released in a 45 RPM extended play version with two songs on each side of two disks. That Bad Eartha spent 12 weeks on the pop albums chart, peaking at No. 5.

Long-playing records were introduced in 1948 by Columbia with 10-inch albums as the popular music format and the 12-inch album the format for classical music. RCA introduced the 45 RPM format shortly afterwards. By the mid-50s, 10″ LPs were phased out, replaced by 12″ ones for popular as well as classical music. At this point, in approximately 1956, RCA Victor reconfigured these two 8-song albums into a 12-track album, jettisoning 4 songs. This then became the standard version of the album.

Several singles were issued from various configurations of these albums. "Under the Bridges of Paris" charted in the UK Singles Chart in 1955 at #7.

Many of the songs recorded for this album, such as "C'est si bon", "Uska Dara" and "I Want to Be Evil" became closely associated with Eartha Kitt, and were performed live by her until one of her last concerts at the Cheltenham Jazz Festival, shortly before her death in December 2008. The complete album was re-issued on CD in 1994 as part of the Bear Family Records five-CD boxset Eartha – Quake; this included "Santa Baby" and several other tracks from the same recording session not included in this album.

== Track listings ==
=== RCA Victor Presents Eartha Kitt (1953) ===
This was the first incarnation of the album, originally released to 10-inch in late-1953. It was released a few months later in early 1954 as a 45 RPM 7-inch double extended play. In 2010 it was issued as a digital download in select European countries under public domain with alternate artwork by Smith & Co.

10-inch Long Play

Track list and notes adapted from liner notes of original release.Track lengths adapted from digital release.

Side A
No.	Title	Length
1.	"I Want to Be Evil"	3:30
2.	"C'est si bon (It's So Good)" (Sung in French)	2:59
3.	"Angelitos Negros" (Sung in Spanish)	3:27
4.	"Avril au Portugal (The Whisp'ring Serenade)" (Sung in French)	2:52
Total length:		12:48

Side B
No.	Title	Length
1.	"Uska Dara-A Turkish Tale" (Sung in Turkish)	3:07
2.	"African Lullaby" (Sung in English and Swahili)	2:52
3.	"Mountain High, Valley Low"	2:36
4.	"Lilac Wine (Dance Me A Song)"	3:45
Total length:		12:20

7-inch Double Extended Play

Track list and notes adapted from liner notes of original release.Track lengths adapted from digital release.

Side A
No.	Title	Length
1.	"I Want To Be Evil"	3:30
2.	"C'est si bon (It's So Good)" (Sung in French)	2:59
Total length:		6:29

Side B
No.	Title	Length
1.	"Angelitos Negros" (Sung in Spanish)	3:27
2.	"Avril au Portugal (The Whisp'ring Serenade)" (Sung in French)	2:52
Total length:		6:19

Side C
No.	Title	Length
1.	"Uska Dara-A Turkish Tale" (Sung in Turkish)	3:07
2.	"African Lullaby" (Sung in English and Swahili)	2:52
Total length:		5:59

Side D
No.	Title	Length
1.	"Mountain High, Valley Low"	2:36
2.	"Lilac Wine (Dance Me A Song)"	3:45
Total length:		6:21

=== That Bad Eartha (EP) (1954) ===
The follow-up to Kitt's first album, RCA Victor Presents Eartha Kitt, That Bad Eartha (EP) was released in 1954, consisting entirely of previously unreleased music. It wasn't until 1956 that a 12-inch album with this title and packaging would be made available; and the later album would only contain four of these songs, with the other eight from her debut. The catalog numbers for the release were LPM-3187 (10-inch version) and EPB3187 (7-inch version).

10-inch Extended Play

Side A
No.	Title	Writer(s)	Length
1.	"Under the Bridges of Paris"	Cochran; Vincent Scotto; Rodor	2:41
2.	"Let's Do It (Let's Fall in Love)"	Porter	3:04
3.	"The Blues"	Ellington	3:34
4.	"My Heart Belongs to Daddy"	Porter	3:01
Total length:			12:20

Side B
No.	Title	Writer(s)	Length
1.	"Sandy's Tune"	Kennedy; Simon	2:34
2.	"Señor"	Adamson; Teixeira	2:58
3.	"Smoke Gets in Your Eyes"	Harbach; Kern	3:05
4.	"Salanga Dou"	Scott	2:26
Total length:			11:03

7-inch Double Extended Play

Credits adapted from label notes of original release.

Side A
No.	Title	Writer(s)	Length
1.	"Under the Bridges of Paris"	Cochran; Rodor; Scotto	2:41
2.	"Let's Do It (Let's Fall in Love)" (from the musical prod. In Paris)	Cole Porter	3:04
Total length:			5:45

Side B
No.	Title	Writer(s)	Length
1.	"The Blues"	Duke Ellington	3:34
2.	"My Heart Belongs to Daddy"	Cole Porter	3:01
Total length:			6:35

Side C
No.	Title	Writer(s)	Length
2.	"Sandy's Tune"	Jimmy Kennedy; Nat Simon	2:34
3.	"Señor"	Harold Adamson; Humberto Teixeira	2:58
Total length:			5:32

Side D
No.	Title	Writer(s)	Length
1.	"Smoke Gets in Your Eyes" (from the musical prod. Roberta)	Otto Harbach; Jerome Kern	3:05
2.	"Salanga Dou"	Tom Scott	2:26
Total length:			5:31

10-inch Long Play (United Kingdom Version)

Released in 1955, it wasn't until 1958 that the now standard, 12-inch long play version of the album was released in the United Kingdom. As a result, this version with catalogue number DLP 1067, released by His Master's Voice, is still considered to be the standard track listing for the album in the UK; the 12-inch version being commonly referred to as the "American Version" within the country. The UK version of the album was released with alternative cover artwork, and was later released to a compact disk compilation.

Credits adapted from liner notes of original release.

Side A
No.	Title	Writer(s)	Length
1.	"Under the Bridges of Paris"	Cochran; Scotto; Rodor	2:41
2.	"Let's Do It (Let's Fall in Love)" (from the musical production In Paris)	Cole Porter	3:04
3.	"The Blues"	Duke Ellington	3:34
4.	"C'est Si Bon" (Sung in French)	André Hornez; Henri Betti	2:58
5.	"My Heart Belongs to Daddy"	Cole Porter	3:01
Total length:			15:18

Side B
No.	Title	Writer(s)	Length
1.	"Monotonous" (from New Faces)	Siegel; Carroll	3:47
2.	"Sandy's Tune"	Jimmy Kennedy; Nat Simon	2:34
3.	"Señor"	Harold Adamson; Humberto Teixeir	2:58
4.	"Smoke Gets in Your Eyes" (from Roberta)	Otto Harbach; Jerome Kern	3:05
5.	"Salanga Dou"	Tom Scott	2:26
Total length:			14:50

=== That Bad Eartha (LP) (1956) ===
As 12-inch records became more popular, RCA Victor re-issued RCA Victor Presents Eartha Kitt as a 12-inch record with four new songs from That Bad Eartha (EP), releasing it synonymously a year after the extended play's release. This is now considered to be the standard track listing of That Bad Eartha in all countries except the United Kingdom, where this version was not officially released until 1958, three years after a ten-track, long play version of That Bad Eartha (EP) was released in the country as a stand-alone album. During the early 1980s this version of the album was re-issued by RCA on 12-inch in the Netherlands entitled "The Classics" That Bad Eartha. In 1984, following her international commercial success with "Where Is My Man", RCA re-issued this version of the album once again on 12-inch, this time also issuing the first cassette and compact disc versions of the album in Germany, Europe, and the UK. Over the course of the next two decades, RCA Victor would release at least four re-issues of the same CD version throughout Europe. By 1994 songs from the album began becoming available in CD compilations in America by numerous record companies. However, it wasn't until 2002 that a CD featuring the full album would become available, released as a two-for-one with Down To Eartha. In 2006, a version of the album featuring 12 bonus tracks would be released in Italy displaying a new cover designed from an alternate shot of Kitt from the same photo shoot for her original album covers for Down to Eartha and Thursday's Child, two months later it was briefly released in the US. The album has since been issued in its entirety on CD by numerous record labels, often in multi-album compilations, throughout the world, and inevitably as a digital download. As of 2007 this album falls into public domain in Europe and is issued freely, without consent from RCA or its parent company Sony Music Entertainment.

12-inch Long Play

Side A
No.	Title	Writer(s)	Length
1.	"I Want to Be Evil"	Lester Judson; Raymond Taylor	3:31
2.	"C'est si bon"	Henri Betti; André Hornez	2:58
3.	"Angelitos Negros"	Andrés Eloy Blanco; Manuel Alvarez Maciste	3:27
4.	"Avril au Portugal (The Whisp'ring Serenade)"	Raul Ferrão; Jimmy Kennedy	2:53
5.	"Let's Do It (Let's Fall in Love)"	Cole Porter	3:04
6.	"My Heart Belongs to Daddy"	Cole Porter	3:01
Total length:			18:54

Side B
No.	Title	Writer(s)	Length
1.	"Uska Dara" (A Turkish Tale)	Traditional	3:08
2.	"African Lullaby"	William Greaves	2:52
3.	"Mountain High, Valley Low"	Bernie Hanighen; Raymond Scott	2:36
4.	"Lilac Wine"	James Shelton	3:45
5.	"Under the Bridges of Paris"	Vincent Scotto; Jean Rodor; Dorcas Cochran	2:41
6.	"Smoke Gets in Your Eyes"	Jerome Kern; Otto Harbach	3:05
Total length:			18:07

CD (1984)

No.	Title	Writer(s)	Length
1.	"I Want to Be Evil"	Lester Judson; Raymond Taylor	3:31
2.	"C'est si bon"	Henri Betti; André Hornez	2:58
3.	"Angelitos Negros"	Andrés Eloy Blanco; Manuel Alvarez Maciste	3:27
4.	"Avril au Portugal (The Whisp'ring Serenade)"	Raul Ferrão; Jimmy Kennedy	2:53
5.	"Let's Do It (Let's Fall in Love)"	Cole Porter	3:04
6.	"My Heart Belongs to Daddy"	Cole Porter	3:01
7.	"Uska Dara" (A Turkish Tale)	Traditional	3:08
8.	"African Lullaby"	William Greaves	2:52
9.	"Mountain High, Valley Low"	Bernie Hanighen; Raymond Scott	2:36
10.	"Lilac Wine"	James Shelton	3:45
11.	"Under the Bridges of Paris"	Vincent Scotto; Jean Rodor; Dorcas Cochran	2:41
12.	"Smoke Gets in Your Eyes"	Jerome Kern; Otto Harbach	3:05
Total length:			37:01

Bonus tracks (2006)
No.	Title	Writer(s)	Length
13.	"Annie Doesn't Live Here Anymore" (B-side of "I Want To Be Evil")	Harold Spina; Joe Young	2:54
14.	"Two Lovers" (B-side of "Uska Dara")	John Rox	2:46
15.	"Señor"	Harold Adamson; Humberto Teixeira	2:58
16.	"Santa Baby" (Non-album single)	Joan Javits; Tony Springer	3:26
17.	"Oh John! (Please Don't Kiss Me)" (from Down To Eartha)	Fred Ebb; Philip Springer	2:48
18.	"Salangadou"	Tom Scott	2:26
19.	"Sandy's Tune"	Harold Adamson; Humberto Teixeira	2:34
20.	"The Blues"	Duke Ellington	3:34
21.	"Lovin' Spree" (Non-album single)	Joan Javits; Philip Springer	2:58
22.	"Somebody Bad Stole de Wedding Bell" (B-side of "Lovin' Spree")	David Mann	2:50
23.	"Looking for a Boy" (from Down To Eartha)	George Gershwin; Ira Gershwin	3:03
24.	"Lonely Girl" (unreleased)	Bobby Troup	3:04
Total length:			72:02

=== That Bad Eartha (Japanese version) ===
7" Extended Play

This was a seven-inch extended play released in Japan of the same name consisting of three songs from different versions of the album and "Santa Baby". It was released with the same cover artwork as Down To Eartha, only changing the letters to "That Bad Eartha", with the same placement and font as the album. Released by Victor of Japan, catalogue number EP-1118.

Track list adapted from label notes of original release.

Side A
No.	Title	Length
1.	"Uska Dara-A Turkish Tale"	3:08
2.	"Santa Baby"	3:26
Total length:		6:34

Side B
No.	Title	Length
1.	"C'est Si Bon"	2:58
2.	"Monotonous"	3:47
Total length:		6:45

== Personnel ==
Personnel adapted from AllMusic. Orchestra and chorus members adapted from the liner notes of the 2006 Universe Italy CD release.

Performance

- Anton Coppola – Orchestra conductor (for "Monotonous")
- Eartha Kitt – vocalist
- Henri René – Orchestra conductor, (producer)
- Henri René & His Orchestra – performer
- Hugo Winterhalter – conductor, (producer)

Chorus members

- Betty Allen – choir, chorus
- Howard Hudson – choir, chorus
- Ada Beth Lee – choir, chorus
- Betty Noyes – choir, chorus

Orchestra members

- Russell Banzer – bassoon
- Milt Bernhart – trombone
- Noel Boggs – guitar
- Julius Brand – violin
- Sidney Brecher – viola
- Frederick Buldrini – violin
- Robert Byrne – trombone
- Warren Covington – trombone
- John d'Agostino – trombone
- Roland Dupont – trombone
- Harold Feldman – oboe
- Arnold Fishkind – bass
- Calman Fleisig – viola
- Harold Furmansky – viola
- Harry Glickman – violin
- Bernard Greenhouse – cello
- Johnny Guarnieri – piano
- Allen Hanlon – guitar
- Julius Held – violin
- Al Hendrickson – guitar
- Harry Hoffman – violin
- Raymond Hunoz – drums
- Harry Katzman – violin
- Bernard Kaufman – saxophone
- Albert Klink – clarinet, saxophone
- Stanley F. Kraft – violin
- Jack Lesberg – bass
- Arno Levitch – violin
- Ivan Lopes – bongos
- Charles Magnante – accordion
- James Maxwell – trumpet
- George Ockner – violin
- Eugene Orloff – violin
- Pullman Pederson – trombone
- Danny Perri – guitar
- Victor Piemonte – calliope
- Jack Pleis – piano
- Edward B. Powell – flute
- Ralph Ransell – marimbas
- Tommy Romersa – drums
- Henry Ross – saxophone
- Henry Rowland – piano
- Art Ryerson – guitar
- Tosha Samaroff – violin
- Frank Saracco – trombone
- Jack Saunders – drums
- Julius Schacter – violin
- William Schaffer – trombone
- Herman Schertzer – clarinet, saxophone
- Lucien Schmit – cello
- Sam Shamper – violin
- Norris "Bunny" Shawker – drums
- Mock Shopnick – bass
- Terry Snyder – drums
- Melvin "Red" Solomon – trumpet
- Sal Spinelli – violin
- Phil Stephens – bass
- Melvin Tax – saxophone
- Anthony Terran – trumpet
- Stanley Webb – saxophone

Technical

- Joe Carlton – producer, (composer)
- Henri René – producer, (Orchestra conductor)
- Hugo Winterhalter – producer, (conductor)

Re-issue

- Norman Blake – recreation (re-issue)
- Joe Foster – producer, recreation (Rev-Ola Records re-issue)
- Nicole Garcia – liner notes (re-issue)
- Stella Lee – arrangement (re-issue)
- Duncan MacDougald, Jr. – liner notes (re-issue)
- Andy Morten – artwork, design (re-issue)
- Steve Huey – liner notes (Universe Italy re-issue)

Composers

- Harold Adamson – composer
- Henri Betti – composer
- Joe Carlton – composer, (producer)
- Dorcas Cochran – composer
- Fred Ebb – composer
- Duke Ellington – composer
- George Gershwin – composer
- Ira Gershwin – composer
- Bernie Hanighen – composer
- Otto Harbach – composer
- André Hornez – composer
- Joan Javits – composer
- Lester Judson – composer
- Jimmy Kennedy – composer
- Jerome Kern – composer
- Jacques Larue – composer
- Manuel Alvarez Maciste – composer
- Dave Mann – composer
- Cole Porter – composer
- John Rox – composer
- Tom Scott – composer
- Vincent Scotto – composer
- James Alan Shelton – composer
- Nat Simon – composer
- Harold Spina – composer
- Philip Springer – composer
- Tony Springer – composer
- Raymond Taylor – composer
- Humberto Teixeira – composer
- Bobby Troup – composer
- Joe Young – composer
- Traditional – composer

== Release history ==
Region	Date	Format	Label	Edition
United States	May 1953	10-inch LP	RCA Victor	RCA Victor Presents Eartha Kitt
United States	1954	2×7″ Double EP	RCA Victor	RCA Victor Presents Eartha Kitt
United States	195?	2×7″ Double EP	RCA	RCA Victor Presents Eartha Kitt
France	1954	10-inch LP	RCA Victor	RCA Victor Presents Eartha Kitt
United States	1954	10-inch EP, 2×7″ Double EP	RCA Victor	That Bad Eartha (EP)
United Kingdom	1955	10-inch LP (UK version)	His Master's Voice	That Bad Eartha (LP)
United States	1956	12-inch LP (standard version)	RCA Victor	That Bad Eartha (LP)
South Africa	1956	12-inch LP (standard version)	RCA, Teal Records	That Bad Eartha (LP)
Canada	Unknown	12-inch LP (standard version)	RCA Victor	That Bad Eartha (LP)
United Kingdom	1958	12-inch LP (standard version)	RCA	That Bad Eartha (LP)
United Kingdom	1958	12-inch LP (standard version)	RCA Victor	That Bad Eartha (LP)
Germany	1958	12-inch LP (standard version)	RCA	That Bad Eartha (LP)
Europe	1958	12-inch LP (standard version)	RCA	That Bad Eartha (LP)
Mexico	Unknown	12-inch LP (standard version)	RCA Victor	That Bad Eartha (LP)
Japan	Unknown	7-inch EP (Japanese version)	Victor	That Bad Eartha
Netherlands	1980	12-inch LP (re-issue)	RCA Victor	"The Originals" That Bad Eartha
Germany	1984	12-inch LP (re-issue), cassette (standard version), CD (standard version) (re-issued 1988–1989, 1992–1993, 1998, 2003 all under the original catalog #ND-89439)	RCA	That Bad Eartha (LP)
United Kingdom	1984	12-inch LP (re-issue), cassette (standard version), CD (standard version) (re-issued 1988–1989, 1992–1993, 1998, 2003 all under the original catalog #ND-89439)	RCA, BMG Records (dist)	That Bad Eartha (LP)
Europe	1984	12-inch LP (re-issue), cassette (standard version), CD (standard version) (re-issued 1988–1989, 1992–1993, 1998, 2003 all under the original catalog #ND-89439)	RCA, BMG Ariola (dist)	That Bad Eartha (LP)
United States	2002	CD (standard version)	BMG Special Products	That Bad Eartha / Down to Eartha
Japan	Unknown	CD (standard version)	RCA Records	That Bad Eartha (LP)
Italy	30 January 2006	CD (bonus track version)	Universe Italy	That Bad Eartha (LP)
United States	21 March 2006	CD (bonus track version)	Universe USA	That Bad Eartha (LP)
Netherlands (CRREV189)	27 November 2006 (ret) (imp) (imp) / 4 December 2006 (lis)	CD (standard version) (reconstructed artwork)	Rev-Ola	That Bad Eartha (LP)
Australia (CRREV189)	27 November 2006 (ret) (imp) (imp) / 4 December 2006 (lis)	CD (standard version) (reconstructed artwork)	Rev-Ola, Red Eye (dist)	That Bad Eartha (LP)
United Kingdom (CRREV189)	27 November 2006 (ret) (imp) (imp) / 4 December 2006 (lis)	CD (standard version) (reconstructed artwork)	Rev-Ola	That Bad Eartha (LP)
Germany (189)	30 Jan 2007	CD (standard version) (reconstructed artwork)	Rev-Ola, Bear Family (dist)	That Bad Eartha (LP)
United Kingdom / Ireland (CR 228)	20 November 2007 (lis) / 3 December 2007 (ret)	CD (standard version) (reconstructed artwork) (UK re-issue / IE first distributed issue), digital download (standard edition) (reconstructed artwork)	Rev-Ola, Cherry Red (dist)	That Bad Eartha (LP)
Spain (CR 228)	3 December 2007 (ret)	Digital download (standard version) (reconstructed artwork)	Rev-Ola	That Bad Eartha (LP)
Canada (CR 228)	11 December 2007 (ret)	CD (standard version) (reconstructed artwork) [import]	Rev-Ola	That Bad Eartha (LP)
Austria	2008	CD (UK version)	Vocalation	That Bad Eartha & Down to Eartha
United Kingdom	2009	CD (UK version)	Vocalation	That Bad Eartha & Down to Eartha
United Kingdom / Ireland	16 February 2009 (ret) / 19 February 2009 (lis)	2xCD (standard version), digital download (standard version)	Avid Easy	Four Classic Albums (That Bad Eartha / Down to Eartha / Thursday's Child / St. Louis Blues)
Canada	16 February 2009 (ret)	digital download (standard version)	Avid Easy	Four Classic Albums (That Bad Eartha / Down to Eartha / Thursday's Child / St. Louis Blues)
United States	11 May 2010 (ret)	2xCD (standard version) [import]	Avid Easy	Four Classic Albums (That Bad Eartha / Down to Eartha / Thursday's Child / St. Louis Blues)
Ireland	2010	digital download	Smith & Co	RCA Victor Presents Eartha Kitt
Europe / North America (imp)	9 July 2013	4xCD Box Set (standard version) [remastered]	Real Gone Jazz	7 Classic Albums (That Bad Eartha / Down to Eartha / Thursday's Child / St. Louis Blues / The Fabulous Eartha / Bad But Beautiful / The Romantic Eartha)
