= Back in Business =

Back in Business may refer to:

- Back in Business (film), a 1997 action film starring Brian Bosworth
- Back in Business (EPMD album), 1997
- Back in Business (Eartha Kitt album), 1994
- "Back in Business", a song by AC/DC from their 1985 album Fly on the Wall
- Back in Business (Desperate Housewives), an episode of the TV series Desperate Housewives
