= Back in Business (Eartha Kitt album) =

Studio album by Eartha Kitt
- Released: November 23, 1994
- Recorded: July 18–20th, 1994
- Length: 49:57
- Label: DRG
- Producer: Hugh Fordin

Eartha Kitt chronology
Thinking Jazz (1991)	Back in Business (1994)	The Most Exciting Woman in the World (1995)

Back in Business is the sixteenth and final studio album by American singer Eartha Kitt, released on November 23, 1994 by DRG Records. At the 38th Annual Grammy Awards in 1996, the album was nominated for Best Traditional Pop Vocal Performance.

== Critical reception ==
Professional ratings
Review scores
Source	Rating
AllMusic	3/5 stars

JT Griffith from AllMusic awarded Back in Business three out of five stars, calling it a "solid collection" that fulfilled Kitt's desire to return to the industry.

== Track listing ==
Back in Business – Standard edition
No.	Title	Writer(s)	Length
1.	"Back in Business"	Stephen Sondheim	3:27
2.	"Let's Misbehave"	Cole Porter	3:29
3.	"Solitude"	Eddie DeLange; Duke Ellington; Irving Mills	4:16
4.	"Why Can't I?"	Lorenz Hart; Richard Rodgers	4:53
5.	"Ain't Misbehavin'"	Harry Brooks; Andy Razaf; Fats Waller	3:27
6.	"The Nearness of You"	Hoagy Carmichael; Ned Washington	4:01
7.	"Close Enough for Love"	Johnny Mandel; Paul Williams	5:19
8.	"Brother, Can You Spare a Dime?"	Jay Gorney; E.Y. "Yip" Harburg	4:51
9.	"Angelitos Negros"	Andrés Eloy Blanco; Manuel Álvarez Maciste	3:42
10.	"Moon River"	Henry Mancini; Johnny Mercer	3:47
11.	"Speak Low"	Ogden Nash; Kurt Weill	4:19
12.	"Here's to Life"	Artie Butler; Phyllis Molinary	4:26
Total length:			49:57

Notes

- "Angelitos Negros" had also been recorded on Eartha's debut album RCA Victor Presents Eartha Kitt (1953), as well as in Revisited (1960).
