= Jennifer Terran =

American singer-songwriter

- Origin: Santa Barbara
- Occupations: Singer-songwriter, pianist
- Instrument: Piano
- Label: Grizelda Records
- Website: www.jenniferterran.com

Jennifer Terran is an American singer-songwriter and pianist from Santa Barbara, California. In 1996, she started her own music label, Grizelda Records. Her most critically acclaimed solo album is The Musician, which was licensed by Continental Record Services in the Netherlands, and recognized by The Sunday Times as one of its best albums of the year in 2002.

== Career ==
Terran plays the piano and sings on her records, often leading to her being compared to Tori Amos. She is also a hip hop dance instructor, as well as a producer, having established her own music label, Grizelda Records, in 1996. She has produced seven solo albums: Cruel, Rabbit, The Musician, Live from Painted Cave, Full Moon in 3, Born from the Womb of Silence and California National Anthem.

Her album The Musician, first released in January 2001, was licensed the following year by Continental Record Services in the Netherlands, the European arm of Rounder Records. In 2002 the Sunday Times selected her album The Musician as its second best album of the year, and it was recognized as the "best pop record of the year" by Dutch magazine Heaven. That year, Terran embarked on a European tour, playing at small venues in the Netherlands, Germany, and the UK.

In December 2007, Terran's recording of "Que Sera Sera" featured in a commercial for Dell's XPS computer, accompanied by exploding monitors and wrecking balls.

== Reception ==
In 2002, critic Mark Edwards wrote in The Times that The Musician was "An astonishing album by an almost unknown singer-songwriter". While noting similarities with Kate Bush and Tori Amos, he said that Terran "takes her songs into darker territories, especially on Mad Magdaline, her epic tale of revenge against the record industry by ... an unknown singer-songwriter". Music & Media compared Terran's "This Recording" as "reminiscent of Beverly Graven's hit Promise Me, only with a lot more lyrical depth".

== Personal life ==
Terran grew up in Los Angeles, California. Her father, trumpeter Tony Terran, was a successful session musician who performed with Frank Sinatra and The Beatles, and is credited on the I Love Lucy theme song. Her mother was a dancer. She was raised as a Mormon, left the religion at 15 years old. Terran sang from an early age, first writing songs post graduating from University of California, Santa Barbara.

== Discography ==
Albums and Release Dates
Title	Release Date
Cruel	January 1997
Rabbit	January 1998
The Musician	January 2001
Live From Painted Cave	January 2004
Full Moon in 3	January 2006
Born From The Womb Of Silence	October 2012
California National Anthem	November 2022
