= April in Portugal (song) =

Song
- English title: "The Whisp'ring Serenade", "Coimbra"
- Written: 1947
- Genre: Fado
- Composer: Raul Ferrão
- Lyricists: Jose Galhardo (Portuguese); Jimmy Kennedy (English)

"April in Portugal" is a popular song, also named "The Whisp'ring Serenade." The music was written by Raul Ferrão with Portuguese lyrics by José Galhardo as a fado named "Coimbra", about the city of that name in 1947. English lyrics written by Jimmy Kennedy were set to the music, though many of the most popular versions of the song were instrumentals. It is one of the signature songs of Portuguese singer and fadista Amália Rodrigues. It was also recorded in French by the tenor Luís Piçarra.

== Charting versions ==
Charting versions were recorded by the Les Baxter orchestra, by the Richard Hayman orchestra, by the Freddy Martin orchestra, and by Vic Damone:

- The Les Baxter recording was released by Capitol Records as catalog number 2374. It first reached the Billboard magazine charts on March 28, 1953, and lasted 22 weeks on the chart, peaking at #2. In 2023, Les Baxter's version of the song was included on the soundtrack of the 2023 film Asteroid City by Wes Anderson.
- The Richard Hayman recording was released by Mercury Records as catalog number 70114. It first reached the Billboard magazine charts on April 25, 1953, and lasted 11 weeks on the chart, peaking at #12.
- The Freddy Martin recording was released by RCA Victor as catalog number 20-5052. It first reached the Billboard magazine charts on May 9, 1953, and lasted 3 weeks on the chart, peaking at #15.
- The Vic Damone recording was released by Mercury Records as catalog number 70128. It first reached the Billboard magazine charts on May 30, 1953, and lasted 3 weeks on the chart, peaking at #16.

On Cash Box magazine's chart, where all versions were combined, the song reached a peak position of #2.

== Other contemporary versions ==
Other versions recorded include those by:

- Tony Martin with Lennie Hayton's orchestra and chorus, recorded on March 26, 1953, released by RCA Victor as catalog number 20-5279 (in USA) and by EMI on the His Master's Voice label as catalog number B 10500.
- Geraldo & his new Concert Orchestra, recorded on April 30, 1953, released by Philips Records as catalog number PB-149
- Louis Armstrong, recorded on April 21, 1953, released by Decca Records as catalog number 28704
- Eartha Kitt with Henri René's Orchestra, recorded on March 13, 1953, released by RCA Victor in an Extended Play album, catalog number EPB 3062
- Mantovani and his Orchestra, recorded on October 14, 1959, on the album Continental Encores for Decca, SKL 4044.
- Bing Crosby with Malcolm Lockyer & His Orchestra, recorded on May 8, 1961, for the "Holiday in Europe" album - produced by Project Records and leased to US Decca.
- Don Costa, released in 1961 on the album The Sound Of The Million Sellers, United Artists WWS 8513.
- Mickey Katz recorded a Yiddish-inflected parody called "Paisach in Portugal" in 1954.
