= Under the Bridges of Paris =

Song
- Published: 1954
- Genre: Jazz
- Composer(s): Vincent Scotto
- Lyricist(s): Jean Rodor (French); Dorcas Cochran (English)

"Under the Bridges of Paris" is a popular 1913 song, consisting of music written by Vincent Scotto, original French lyrics (entitled "Sous les ponts de Paris") written by Jean Rodor in 1913, and partial English lyrics added in by Dorcas Cochran in 1952, resulting in the version released in 1954 containing lyrics in both French and English.

== Background ==
Recordings by both Eartha Kitt (released as a B-side to "Santa Baby") and Dean Martin charted in the United Kingdom in 1955, but failed to chart in the United States, though both were subsequently released as LP album tracks.

The recording by Eartha Kitt in collaboration with Henri René and his orchestra and chorus was completed in New York City on October 25, 1953. It was released by RCA Victor Records as catalogue number 20-5502 (in the USA) and by EMI on the His Master's Voice label as catalogue number B 10647. Kitt's recording appears on her 1954 album That Bad Eartha.

Michel Legrand recorded a jazz trio version of the song for his Paris-themed album of 1960, Legrand Piano. It was also performed by Polish singer Violetta Villas during her Las Vegas shows in the late 1960s.
