= Eartha Kitt discography =

This article contains the discography of American singer Eartha Kitt.

== Albums ==
=== Studio albums ===
RCA Victor releases 1952 to 1959

- 1952: Leonard Sillman's New Faces Of 1952 (Original Cast) (as cast member) (LOC1008; 12-inch)
- 1953: RCA Victor Presents Eartha Kitt (with Henri René and His Orchestra) (LPM-3062; 10-inch)
- 1954: That Bad Eartha (10-inch, 8-song album) (with Henri René and His Orchestra) (LPM-3187; 10-inch)
- 1954: Leonard Sillman presents Mrs. Patterson (Original Cast Recording) (as starring cast member)
- 1955: Down to Eartha (with Henri René and His Orchestra) (LPM-1109; 12-inch)
- 1956: That Bad Eartha (12-inch compilation from 1953-54 10-inch albums) (with Henri René and His Orchestra) (LPM-1183; 12-inch)
- 1957: Thursday's Child (with Henri René and His Orchestra) (LPM-1300)
- 1958: St. Louis Blues (with Shorty Rogers and His Orchestra) (LPM-1661)

Kapp Records releases 1959 to 1960

- 1959: The Fabulous Eartha
- 1960: Revisited

MGM Records release 1962

- 1962: Bad But Beautiful

EMI Columbia releases 1963 to 1965

- 1962: The Romantic Eartha
- 1965: Love for Sale (with Tony Osborne and His Orchestra) (SCX-3563)

Decca Records release 1965

- 1965: Canta en Español/Sings In Spanish

Caedmon Records releases 1968

- 1968: Folk Tales of the Tribes Of Africa
- 1968: Black Pioneers in American History (with Moses Gunn)

Spark Records release 1970

- 1970: Sentimental Eartha

Can't Stop Productions release 1984

- 1984: I Love Men

Swing Disques release 1985

- 1985: Eartha Kitt, Doc Cheatham, Bill Coleman, with George Duvivier & Co. (FR; SW8410) [album features four previously unreleased tracks from a Paris recording session in 1950; the original, unreleased 1950 performing credit was "Eartha Kitt with Doc Cheatham & His Trio"]

Ariola Records releases 1989 to 1990

- 1989: I'm Still Here

ITM Records releases 1991 to 1992

- 1991: Thinking Jazz

DRG Records release 1994

- 1994: Back in Business

West Wind Records release 2000

- 1999: Thinking Jazz

=== Live albums ===
MGM Records release 1962

- 1962 Bad But Beautiful / The Most Exciting Woman in the World

EMI Columbia releases 1963 to 1965

- 1963 C'est Si Bon, Live in Tivoli

GNP Crescendo release 1965

- 1965 Eartha Kitt Live at the Plaza

Ariola Records releases 1989 to 1990

- 1990: Live in London

ITM Records releases 1991 to 1992

- 1992: Standards/Live

Kulter Video release 1994

- 1994-1995: The Most Exciting Women in the World (1994 VHS) (1995 CD)

DRG Records release 2006

- 2006 Live from the Cafe Carlyle

Strike Force Entertainment release 2008

- 2008 Live at the Cheltenham Jazz Festival

=== Extended play albums ===
- 1954: That Bad Eartha
- 1954: Sings Songs from "New Faces"
- 1955: Down to Eartha (U.S.; RCA; EPB1109) [re-issued in 1960]
- 1956: Just an Old Fashioned Girl (U.S.; RCA; EPA 9053)
- 1956: Thursday's Child (U.S.; RCA; EPA-844)
- 1956: Gold N Kitt (SWE; RCA; EPS 157) (two Swedish songs, two instrumentals with Gold's orchestra)
- 1959: Gold ´n' Kitt (DE; RCA; EPS 157) [German re-issue of Gold N Kitt]
- 1959: That Blue Eartha (U.K.; RCA; SRC-7015) [EP version of St. Louis Blues]
- 1959: Just Eartha (DE; RCA; RCX-138)
- 1960: Revisited

== Singles ==
=== Charted singles ===
Year	Single	Peak positions									
Year	Single	U.S.	U.S. Dance	AUS	BEL	FRA	GER	NLD	NZL	SWE	UK
1953	"Uska Dara"	23	—	—	—	—	—	—	—	—	—
1953	"C'est Si Bon"	8	—	—	—	—	—	—	—	—	—
1953	"Santa Baby"	4	—	—	—	92	68	—	—	—	44
1953	"I Want to Be Evil"	22	—	—	—	—	—	—	—	—	—
1954	"Lovin' Spree"	20	—	—	—	—	—	—	—	—	—
1954	"Somebody Bad Stole de Wedding Bell"	16	—	—	—	—	—	—	—	—	—
1954	"Let's Do It"	—	—	12	—	—	—	—	—	—	—
1954–1955	"Under the Bridges of Paris"	—	—	20	—	—	—	—	—	—	7
1956	"Nothin' for Christmas"	—	—	18	—	—	—	—	—	—	—
1963	"Just an Old Fashioned Girl"	—	—	41	—	—	—	—	—	—	—
1964	"You're My Man"	—	—	95	—	—	—	—	—	—	—
1983	"Where Is My Man"	—	7	70	6	—	31	22	28	5	36
1984	"I Love Men"	—	—	—	29	—	26	—	49	—	50
1986	"This Is My Life"	—	—	—	—	19	—	—	—	—	73
1989	"Cha Cha Heels" (with Bronski Beat)	—	—	—	—	—	—	—	—	—	32
1994	"If I Love Ya Then I Need Ya"	—	—	—	—	—	—	—	—	—	43
"—" denotes items which were not released in that country or failed to chart

=== Complete list of singles ===
- 1952: "Tierre va Tembla" / "Caliente" (U.S.; SEECO; SR-8242)
- 1952: "Monotonous" / "Boston Beguine" (U.S.; RCA; 47-4952)
- 1953: "Uska Dara – A Turkish Tale" / "Two Lovers" (U.S.; RCA; 47-5284)
- 1953: "C'est Si Bon"/ "African Lullaby" (U.S.; RCA; 47-5358)
- 1953: "I Want to Be Evil" / "Annie Doesn't Live Here Anymore" (U.S.; RCA; 20-5442)
- 1953: "Santa Baby" / "Under The Bridges Of Paris" (with Henri René and His Orchestra) (U.S.; RCA; 247-5502)
- 1954: "Lovin' Spree" / "Somebody Bad Stole de Wedding Bell" (U.S.; RCA; 20-5610)
- 1954: "Let's Do It" / "Senor" (U.S.; RCA; 47-5737)
- 1954: "Mink Shmink" / "Easy Does It" (U.S.; RCA; 47-5756)
- 1954: "Apres Moi" / "I Wantcha Around" (U.S.; RCA; 47-5776)
- 1954: "If I Was a Boy" / "Tea in Chicago" (U.S.; RCA; 5882)
- 1954: "Hey Jacques" / "(This Year's) Santa Baby" (U.S.; RCA; 47-5914)
- 1955: "Fredy" / "Sweet And Gentle" – with Perez Prado (U.S.; RCA Victor; 47-6138 )
- 1955: "Under the Bridges of Paris" / "Let's Do It" (U.K.; RCA; 47-1014)
- 1955: "The Heel" / "My Heart's Delight" (U.S.; RCA; 47-6009)
- 1955: "Do You Remember" / "Mambo de Paree" (U.S.; RCA; 47-6197)
- 1955: "Sho-Jo-Ji (The Hungry Raccoon)" / "Nobody Taught Me" (U.S.; RCA; 47-6245)
- 1956: "I'm a Funny Dame" / "Put More Wood on the Fire" (U.S.; RCA; 47-6267)
- 1956: "Rosenkyssar" / "Vid kajen" (SWE; RCA on 7-inch vinyl and 78 rpm) (both songs in Swedish. Re-released on a Swedish EP in 1959; it sold better there)
- 1955: "Nothin' for Christmas" / "Je Cherche un Homme (I Want a Man)" (U.S.; RCA; 47-6319)
- 1956: "Honolulu Rock & Roll" / "There is No Cure for L'Amour" (U.S.; RCA; 47-6521)
- 1957: "A Woman Wouldn't Be a Woman" / "Toujour Gai" (U.S.; RCA; 47-6928)
- 1957: "Take My Love, Take My Love" / "Yomme Yomme" (U.S.; RCA; 47-7013)
- 1957: "If I Can't Take It With Me" / "Proceed With Caution" (U.S.; RCA; 47-7118)
- 1958: "Just An Old-Fashioned Girl" / "If I Can't Take It With Me (When I Go)" (U.K.; RCA; 1087)
- 1959: "Sholem" / "Love is a Gamble" (U.S.; Kapp; 294)
- 1960: "I Wantcha Around" / "Johnny with the Gentle Hands" (U.S.; Kapp; 333)
- 1961: "No Second Chance" / "You're My Man" (DE; RCA; 47-9525)
- 1962: "A Lady Loves" / "Please Do It Again" (U.K.; MGM; 1153)
- 1962: "Good Little Girls" / "Diamonds Are a Girl's Best Friend" (U.K.; MGM; 1178)
- 1962: "It's So Nice to Have a Man Around the House" / "Lola Lola" (AU; Columbia; DO4414)
- 1963: "Mack the Knife" / "Tierra va Tembla" (U.S.; Kapp; 10 246 AU)
- 1963: "Little White Lies" / "An Englishman Needs Time" (U.K.; Columbia; Db 4985)
- 1963: "Lola Lola" / "I Had a Hard Day Last Night" (U.S.; RCA; DB7170)
- 1965: "The Art of Love" / "Nikki" (U.S.; Brunswick; 05937)
- 1965: "Any Way You Want It Baby / There Comes a Time" (U.S.; Musicor; MU 1220)
- 1965: "Chez Moi" / "When the World was Young" (U.K.; HMV; 1401)
- 1968: "Che Vale Per Me" / "Eccomi" (IT; CDI; CDI 2021)
- 1971: "A Knight for My Nights" / "Summer Storm" (U.K.; RCA; CBS S 7626)
- 1971: "Gib mir deine Hände" / "Ein Sommertraum" (DE; Spark; 14685AT)
- 1972: "Catch the Wind" / "Hurdy Gurdy Man" (DE; Spark; 14 572 AT)
- 1983: "Where Is My Man" (U.S.; Streetwise; SWRL 221)
- 1984: "I Love Men" (NL; High Fashion Music; MS 128)
- 1986: "I Don't Care" (FR; Scorpio Music; 885 233-1)
- 1986: "This Is My Life" (DE; Metronome; 883 791-1ME )
- 1987: "Arabian Song" (U.K.; Quazar Records; QUAT 1)
- 1989: "Cha Cha Heels" (Eartha Kitt and Bronski Beat) (DE; Ariola; 662 213 )
- 1989: "Primitive Man" (Ariola; 612 713)
- 1994: "Where Is My Man (Remix 94')" (DE; Blow Up; INT 125.645)
- 1994: "If I Love Ya Then I Need Ya, If I Need Ya Then I Wantcha Around" (U.K.; RCA; 20-5776)
- 1998: "Where Is My Man '98" (DE; ZYX Music; ZYX 8857-8 )
- 2000: "Where Is My Man (Joe T. Vannelli Remix)" (U.S.; Groovilicious; GM 225)
- 2001: "This Is My Life (Eartha Kitt vs. Joe T. Vannelli)" (IT; Dream Beat; DB 154)
