= Jam (Turn It Up) =

Single by Kim Kardashian
- Released: March 2, 2011
- Recorded: 2010
- Genre: Dance-pop
- Length: 4:35
- Label: Self-released
- Songwriters: The-Dream; Tricky Stewart
- Producer: The-Dream

Kim Kardashian singles chronology
"Jam (Turn It Up)" (2011)	"Santa Baby" (2024)

"Jam (Turn It Up)" is the debut single by American television personality Kim Kardashian. The song features background vocals by singer-songwriter and record producer The-Dream. The song was released on iTunes Store on March 2, 2011, and half of the proceeds from the sales of the song were donated to St. Jude Children's Research Hospital. Shortly after the song's release, Kardashian confirmed that she had no plans to put out a full-length album any time soon. Years later, she also admitted that she regretted recording the song.

== Background ==
In early 2010, Kardashian was introduced to The-Dream by her friend, American singer and songwriter Ciara. Later that year, he reached out to her to pitch an idea and create a debut single for her; she was reluctant at first and sought advice from friends such as Kanye West and others who work in the industry: "They gave me good advice. They asked me what I do for fun, and I said, 'I go shopping, I hang out with friends.' And was told, 'We go to the studio for fun. Come have fun with us. Don't think too much about it.'" so after a lot of thinking she accepted the challenge. The-Dream would later state that "This was very, very – believe it or not – a very fun moment for me. It's one of my lightest musical moments. [...] It wasn't about kicking off a singing career; it was us really having the power of TV and goofing off."

Kardashian first premiered the song on December 31, 2010, at TAO nightclub in Las Vegas. In a video that captured the song's unveiling, Kardashian is seen giving the crowd a brief introduction before launching into the new song; "I didn't mean to, but I did this song with The-Dream, and it's really fun! I hope you guys like it!" she told the crowd. Titled "Turn It Up" and written by The-Dream and Tricky Stewart, the song features synthesizers and vocal harmonies. The-Dream can be heard backing up Kardashian's airy vocals on the chorus of the track.

Three months later the song premiered during On Air with Ryan Seacrest, on March 2, 2011, was released on iTunes two days later. Kardashian also revealed that a portion of the proceeds from the sales of the song would be donated to St. Jude Children's Research Hospital. The song made its television premiere during the March 6, 2011 episode of Kourtney & Kim Take New York, titled "Dream a Little Dream". When asked if an album is in the works, Kardashian replied: "There's no album in the works or anything – just one song we did for the show, and a video Hype Williams directed, half of the proceeds we're giving away to a cancer foundation, because The-Dream's and one of my parents passed away from cancer. It's just all having fun – with a good cause".

== Critical reception ==
The track was panned by critics. Jim Farber, writing for the Daily News, called the song a "dead-brained piece of generic dance music, without a single distinguishing feature," and suggested that the single made Kardashian the "worst singer in the reality TV universe." R&B singer Keri Hilson gave her take on Kim's attempt at the music industry during an interview, saying "I haven't [followed the story] at all, actually, I thought it was rumor, [...] but hey, I think we're all entitled to follow our dreams. And if that's part of her dream, then go for it. You know? I wouldn't resent anybody for trying something new and you never know what could happen. [Kim] could discover that she has a new passion."

In an August 2014 appearance on Bravo's Watch What Happens: Live, Kardashian stated that the biggest regret in her life was recording the song:

"It’s definitely a memory and it was a fun experience. We gave the proceeds to a cancer organization, But if there’s one thing in life that I wish I didn’t do ... I don’t like it when people kind of dabble into things they shouldn’t be. And that I don’t think I should have. Like, what gave me the right to think I could be a singer? Like, I don’t have a good voice."

== Commercial performance ==
In its first month on sale, the song sold over 60,000 pure copies in the United States.

== Music video ==
When it was first reported that Kanye West was scheduled to appear in an upcoming episode of Kardashian's new reality series Kourtney & Kim Take New York, it didn't take long for people to guess that they were up to something musically. "He's a musical genius, so I would be honored to work with Kanye," Kim told MTV News. It was later revealed that they were working in the music video for the song, which was filmed through December 28, 2010 and the beginning of January 2011 at a Culver City, California recording studio by director Hype Williams but never officially released. The video also featured a special appearance by Kanye West. In March, Kim tweeted pictures from the video shoot in which she is sporting a white fur and long braids. Some behind-the-scenes archive footage from the video were shown in ads for Keeping Up with the Kardashians, Season 6. According to Kim's sister, Khloé Kardashian, "It [the video] was never meant to be played publicly." She continues, "I've seen it. It's to die for. Her body is banging, baby. [...] The song was for charity; it wasn't for her to have a recording deal. [It was] something she just wanted to be for herself and for fun, so the video she made just for herself," she told MTV News in May. Six months after the song was released, on August 29, 2011, a 55-second teaser of the video was leaked against her wishes on to the internet. The video features scenes of Kardashian "oiled up, writhing around in a pair of tiny pink booty shorts and a white tank top, displaying wet and wild hair as well as a shiny appearance to her skin; In another part of the clip Kim vamps it up donning bright-red, ultra shiny lipstick and giant mirrored aviator sunglasses as she licks her lips for the camera and gazes sultrily into the lens. At one point the camera pans to a shot of Kim's famous derrière in a pair of neon pink shorts before showing her lying down in a revealing white top."

== Track listing ==
- Digital download
1. "Jam (Turn It Up)" – 4:35

== Charts ==
Chart (2011)	Peak position
US Billboard Bubbling Under Hot 100	17
