= Santa Baby =

1953 Christmas song recorded by Eartha Kitt

Single by Eartha Kitt and Henri René and His Orchestra

from the EP Eartha Kitt
- B-side: "Under the Bridges of Paris"
- Released: October 1953
- Recorded: October 5, 1953
- Genre: Christmas
- Length: 3:22
- Label: RCA Victor
- Songwriters: Joan Javits; Philip Springer; Tony Springer
- Producer: Henri Renee

Eartha Kitt singles chronology
"I Want to Be Evil" (1953)	"Santa Baby" (1953)	"Lovin' Spree" (1954)

Henri René and His Orchestra singles chronology
"I Want to Be Evil" (1953)	"Santa Baby" (1953)	"Lovin' Spree" (1954)

Official audio
- "Santa Baby" on YouTube

"Santa Baby" is a song performed by American singer Eartha Kitt with Henri René and His Orchestra and originally released in 1953. The song was written by Joan Javits and Philip Springer, who also used the pseudonym Tony Springer in an attempt to speed up the song's publishing process. Lyrically, the song is a tongue-in-cheek look at a Christmas list addressed to Santa Claus by a woman who wants extravagant gifts such as sables, yachts, and decorations from Tiffany, which become increasingly laced with innuendo and the implication that the woman is a "sugar baby" infatuated with her Santa.

Music critics gave mixed reviews to the single, with some calling it too suggestive for a holiday-themed song. Springer was initially dissatisfied with "Santa Baby" and called it one of his weakest works. It has since been included on lists of both the best and worst Christmas songs ever written.

In the United States, "Santa Baby" became the best-selling Christmas song of 1953 and found more success, retrospectively, when it entered various component charts by Billboard in the 2000s and 2010s. Elsewhere, it has charted in Canada, France, Germany, Switzerland, and the United Kingdom. As of 2014, Kitt's version had sold more than 620,000 copies, having appeared on her self-titled and first extended play in 1954.

"Santa Baby" has been parodied, referenced, and featured in various films and television series. It has also been covered by many artists, such as Mae West, Madonna, Kylie Minogue, Taylor Swift, and Trisha Yearwood, Ariana Grande, Gwen Stefani, Michael Bublé and Kim Kardashian. Many of the cover versions experienced major commercial success, with Minogue's version reaching the top 40 of the UK Singles Chart and selling over 600,000 copies. Madonna's cover has sold over 500,000 copies in the United States and was subject to discussion by many music critics, who believed her version revived the popularity of the song. However, Kitt disliked Madonna's association with the track. Grande's cover was released as a duet with Elizabeth Gillies and managed positions on charts in several countries such as Australia, the Netherlands, and Sweden. Bublé's version has been named multiple times as one of the worst Christmas songs ever.

== Background ==
In August 1953, songwriters Philip Springer and Joan Javits were commissioned to write a Christmas song for Eartha Kitt for the upcoming holiday season. The writers had first met in 1950 during Springer's trip to Massachusetts where Javits had sought advice about beginning a career as a songwriter, which he advised against. Their professional relationship resumed three years later when Springer was searching for a new writing partner, he recalled:

I was looking for a new lyric writer, so I asked someone who had a lot of contacts and they suggested Joan Javits, the exact person who I suggested stay out of the industry! She said she was too busy. I asked her if she had ever written a hit and she said hadn't, so I said, ‘l have. Are you going to tell me that you refuse to write songs with a songwriter who's done more than you in the business?'

In a 2008 interview, Springer told the interviewer that "Philip and Joan (both ASCAP writers) checked into the song title with the publishers from a company called Trinity Music, owned by BMI. At the time, BMI and ASCAP were entrenched in a 'war,' as Philip described it, so in order to get the song published and settle their differences, they had to create a fictional BMI songwriter who they named Tony Springer."

== Recording and release ==
Kitt recorded the single live with René and his orchestra on October 5, 1953, at a recording studio in New York City. The song was released later that month by RCA Victor in the United States and Canada. To promote the single, the record label purchased page advertisements in Billboard as "1953's Big Christmas Record!" It was pressed as a 7-inch single for wide release, while a promotional 10-inch single was created for airplay. The RCA Victor 7-inch release featured Kitt and René's version of "Under the Bridges of Paris" as the B-side. In the United Kingdom and Denmark, "Santa Baby" was released in 1954 under the label His Master's Voice. On this version, the B-side was Kitt's cover of "Let's Do It (Let's Fall in Love)". Kitt also performed the song in the 1954 film New Faces, after which it was used as the closing track of the extended play Eartha Kitt.

The single received numerous reissues, including in Italy in 1957 when RCA Italiana released a 7-inch single that was paired with B-side "Thursday's Child". The same label also distributed a four track promotional extended play titled White Christmas that same year, featuring Kitt's version of "Santa Baby" as the second A-side. In 1987, Collectables Records released a limited edition 7 inch single of Kitt's "C'est si bon" (1953) paired with "Santa Baby" on the flip side.

In 1960, Kitt recorded a new studio version of "Santa Baby" for her Kapp album Revisited with Maurice Levine as musical director. The album featured new versions of songs she had recorded earlier with RCA Victor. The Kapp version is faster and shorter by about a minute, with more emphasis on orchestration and no vocal accompaniment.

== Composition and lyrics ==
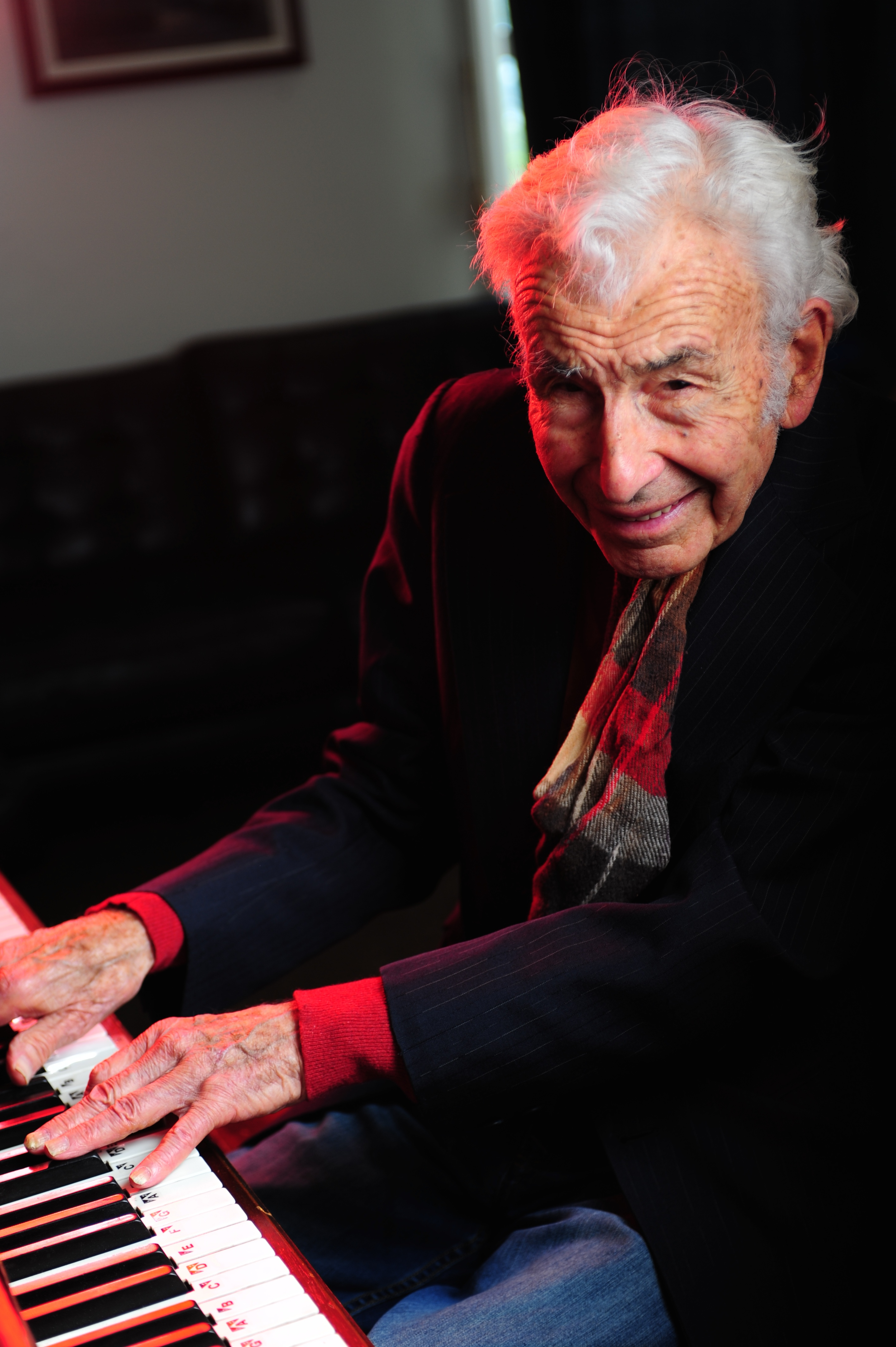
According to co-writer Philip Springer, he came up with the music for "Santa Baby" and completed it within ten minutes.

According to the official sheet music for the song at Musicnotes.com, "Santa Baby" is set in common time with a moderately slow tempo of 84 beats per minute. The key of the song is D-flat major with Kitt maintaining a relatively consistent vocal range that spans from A♭_{3} to A♭_{4} in scientific pitch notation. The song contains chord progressions that follow a D♭-B♭m-E♭-A♭ pattern in the verses and whenever she sings "Santa baby, so hurry down the chimney tonight".

Upon completing the lyrical component of "Santa Baby", Philip Springer expressed his dissatisfaction with its content. During a meeting with a group of music publishers in 1953, Springer warned them: "Gentlemen, this is not really the kind of music that I like to write. I hope it's OK. It's the best I could do."

== Public reception ==
In a 2019 poll created by Evening Standard, Kitt's version of "Santa Baby" was voted the ninth "most annoying festive song" by British listeners. A 2021 YouGov poll in the United States registered it the most annoying Christmas song.

== Commercial performance ==
According to Billboard, "Santa Baby" was the best-selling Christmas song of 1953, mostly due to the controversy surrounding it. RCA Victor, Kitt's label at the time, referred to the single as "far more than a seasonal success [...] but a further tribute to Eartha's art – for, as each of us desires, she can make every day of the year seem like Christmas". On the US Billboard Best Selling Singles chart, "Santa Baby" debuted at number 16 before rising to number ten the following week, ultimately peaking at number 4. On November 21, 1953, Billboard reported that the single had sold 200,000 copies, which the magazine called surprising: "Unlike many other Christmas tunes it has broken the deejays' 'We won't play Christmas records in November' sound barrier, and has been getting loads of airtime."

"Santa Baby" entered several of the Billboard charts in the twenty-first century. In 2005, the song had its best week on the Digital Songs chart, reaching number 28 in the month of December. It returned to the chart in December 2007, when it re-entered at number 59. During the week of December 21, 2012, "Santa Baby" peaked at number 11 on Billboard's seasonal Holiday Digital Song Sales chart in the United States. In total, the single has spent 101 weeks ranking on the chart. It also reached the similar Holiday Streaming Songs chart where it peaked at number 6. On December 9, 2008, the mastertone recording of "Santa Baby" received a gold certification from the Recording Industry Association of America, denoting shipments of 500,000 copies or more. Sony BMG reported that "Santa Baby" is one of the holiday season's most popular ringtones, and that it in addition to six other holiday songs have sold an accumulated 2.3 million units in one year later. The Billboard-published Ringtones chart later listed Kitt's version of the song peaking at number 6 in December 2010. According to the German database Statista, Kitt's version of "Santa Baby" has sold 620,000 copies in the United States as of 2014.

In later years, the track found more success and entered the record charts in several countries other than the United States. According to Springer, the retrospective success of "Santa Baby" was completely unexpected. In an interview with the Los Angeles Times, he said: "I ask myself, ‘How come?' I've written so many songs that, to me, musically are much better than 'Santa Baby', and they're not popular. The answer has to be that 'Santa Baby' has a magic that goes beyond a composer's plans." In Canada, the single reached number 42 on the Canadian Hot 100 in 2023. In the United Kingdom, Kitt's version of "Santa Baby" debuted on the UK Singles Chart in 2007, when it hit number 85. It had previously reached number 30 on the accompanying UK Singles Downloads Chart in 2006. The single had its best-performing period on the UK Singles Chart during the 2023 holiday season, when it charted for three weeks and reached its highest peak position to date of number 44. The British Phonographic Industry later awarded "Santa Baby" a gold certification, signifying certified units of 400,000 copies. In France, the single debuted with a peak of number 92 on December 28, 2013; it dropped to 113 the following week but rose to 96 the week after that, marking its last appearance overall. "Santa Baby" also charted in Germany and Switzerland and positions 73 in 2018 and 94 in 2019, respectively.

== Legacy ==
Following the mixed reception that music critics gave to "Santa Baby" in 1953, Springer and Javits reworked the song completely for the upcoming year. In 1954, Kitt recorded a new holiday song titled "This Year's Santa Baby", featuring new lyrics but identical songwriter credits. The publishing company who handled the song's legal matters promoted the new release by distributing "Santa Baby"-themed apparel, in addition to releasing country pop and children-specific versions of the song.

Rob LeDonne from Billboard called "Santa Baby" one of the "most recognizable non-traditional yuletide recordings" in a piece commemorating its 65th anniversary. In 2019, Kelly O'Sullivan of Country Living ranked "Santa Baby" at number 56 on her list of the "60 Best Christmas Songs".

On August 4, 1989, Billboard released Christmas Greatest Hits 1935–1954, a collection of 10 popular Christmas tracks in the United States, in which "Santa Baby" was included in the track listing. Kitt has since featured "Santa Baby" on several of her compilation albums in her discography. She also reprised the tune for her seventh studio album, Revisited (1960), and her first live album, Eartha Kitt at Tivoli (1962). In later years, it appeared on catalog albums such as Eartha Kitt (1979), At Her Very Best (1981), The Best of Eartha Kitt (1982), Mink Shmink (1989), Eartha-Quake (1993), After Dark (1995), That Seductive Eartha (1996), The Ultimate Collection (1996), Purr-Fect: Greatest Hits (1999), Greatest Hits (2000), Legendary (2001), and Heavenly Eartha (2002).

== Track listings and formats ==
United States and Canada 7" single

1. "Santa Baby" – 3:22
2. "Under the Bridges of Paris" – 2:40

United States promotional 10" single

1. "Santa Baby" – 3:22
2. "Under the Bridges of Paris" – 2:40

United Kingdom and Denmark 7" single (1954)

1. "Santa Baby" – 3:22
2. "Let's Do It (Let's Fall in Love)" – 3:11

Italy 7" single (1957)

1. "Santa Baby" – 3:22
2. "Thursday's Child" – 4:00

United States 7" limited edition single (1987)

1. "C'est si bon" – 3:01
2. "Santa Baby" – 3:22

== Charts ==
Chart performance for "Santa Baby"
Chart (1953–2026)	Peak position
Austria (Ö3 Austria Top 40)	55
Canada Hot 100 (Billboard)	31
France (SNEP)	92
Germany (GfK)	68
Global 200 (Billboard)	27
Greece International (IFPI)	64
Ireland (IRMA)	43
Latvia (DigiTop100)	91
Lithuania (AGATA)	66
Netherlands (Single Top 100)	81
Poland (Polish Streaming Top 100)	78
Portugal (AFP)	111
Romania Airplay (TopHit)	94
Sweden (Sverigetopplistan)	82
Switzerland (Schweizer Hitparade)	38
UK Singles (Official Charts)	44
UK Indie (Official Charts)	9
US Billboard Best Selling Singles	4
US Billboard Hot 100	19
US Holiday 100 (Billboard)	18
US Rolling Stone Top 100	61

== Certifications ==
Certifications for "Santa Baby"
Region	Certification	Certified units/sales
Denmark (IFPI Danmark)	Gold	45,000^{‡}
New Zealand (RMNZ)	Gold	15,000^{‡}
United Kingdom (BPI)	Platinum	600,000^{‡}
United States (RIAA)	Gold	620,000
Streaming
Greece (IFPI Greece)	Gold	1,000,000^{†}
^{‡} Sales+streaming figures based on certification alone.^{†} Streaming-only figures based on certification alone.

== Madonna version ==
"Santa Baby"

Song by Madonna

from the album A Very Special Christmas
- Released: October 12, 1987
- Genre: Christmas
- Length: 2:35
- Label: A&M
- Songwriters: Joan Javits; Philip Springer; Tony Springer
- Producer: Jimmy Iovine

Audio video
- "Santa Baby" on YouTube

Madonna recorded a cover of "Santa Baby" for the 1987 charity album A Very Special Christmas. It was released on October 12, 1987, by A&M Records.

Caroline Framke from the A.V. Club argued that Madonna's version increased the popularity of the song, initiating an "explosion of covers and parodies [to] follow". When asked about his thoughts on Madonna's cover, Phil Springer said he was happy she covered the original Kitt rendition instead of the revised "This Year's Santa Baby" from 1954. Randall Norberts from the Los Angeles Times insisted that "Madonna was the perfect adapter for the song when she recorded it in 1987", comparing the lyrical messages between "Santa Baby" and her 1985 single "Material Girl". After the release of Madonna's "Santa Baby" in 1987, the song became licensed and was used in various theatrical releases and television series, such as Driving Miss Daisy (1989), The Sopranos (1999), and Elf (2003).

=== Musical structure ===
In Madonna's version of "Santa Baby", the singer heightened her range by half of an octave in order to "reach the aggressively cutesy 'baby voice' that the song has come to be associated with".

=== Critical reception ===
Madonna's cover of "Santa Baby" was met with divided opinions from music critics. The staff at BlackBook gave a positive review, finding Madonna's version to contain "a sense of humor she's long since replaced". According to Framke from the A.V. Club wrote of the song: "There is no Christmas song more polarizing than 'Santa Baby'". She stated that part of the song's commercial appeal stems from its sexual implications and claimed that although Kitt's version contained sensual vocals, Madonna's version is what "cranked the sex appeal up to 11". It was also reported by Framke that Kitt was displeased with Madonna's cover of her single. During a live performance of "Santa Baby" years after Madonna's version was released, Kitt was quoted saying: "I used to have a lot of fun with this song, and then Madonna sang it". In his review for Kansas Pitch, David Cantwell said "Madonna's recording of 'Santa Boy' is so lame that it actually succeeds in making the phrase 'merry Christmas' seem like a contradiction in terms".

Xavier Piedra from Billboard included Madonna's version in an unranked list of the top ten best covers of "Santa Baby". His review stated: "This cover from the legendary pop singer is guaranteed to be stuck in your head, and on your holiday playlist, for days." Paris Close, also a writer for Billboard, included the cover in her list of "15 Songs For an LGBTQ Holiday Kiki" and claimed its sex appeal would be enough to "spice up any occasion".

=== Chart performance ===
Many years after its initial release, Madonna's version of "Santa Baby" entered various holiday-centric charts in the United States. On the main Holiday 100 chart, it peaked at number 44 in December 2011 during its fourth and final week. On the Holiday Airplay chart compiled by Billboard, it peaked at number 24 during the week ending December 13, 2003, marking Madonna's first entry on that chart. It spent a total of 11 non-consecutive weeks among the Holiday Airplay chart. In the United States, "Santa Baby" did not enter Billboard's Digital Songs chart, but rather the Holiday Digital Song Sales component chart. In 2010, the song peaked at number 46; in total, her cover spent three weeks tallied on the chart. Statista reported in 2014 that Madonna's cover of "Santa Baby" has sold over 500,000 copies in the United States.

=== Charts ===
Chart performance for "Santa Baby"
Chart (2003–2025)	Peak position
Croatia International Airplay (Top lista)	99
US Holiday 100 (Billboard)	44
US Holiday Airplay (Billboard)	24
US Holiday Digital Song Sales (Billboard)	46

== Kylie Minogue version ==
"Santa Baby"

Promotional single by Kylie Minogue
- A-side: "Please Stay"
- Released: December 11, 2000
- Recorded: 2000
- Studio: Metropolis Studio (Melbourne, Australia)
- Genre: Christmas
- Length: 3:23
- Label: Parlophone
- Songwriters: Joan Javits; Philip Springer
- Producer: Chong Lim

Audio video
- "Santa Baby" on YouTube

=== Background and release ===
Kylie Minogue originally recorded a cover of "Santa Baby" in 2000. It was used as the B-side to her single "Please Stay", from her seventh studio album Light Years (2000), on select physical releases in 2000. A promotional CD single for "Santa Baby" was distributed by Parlophone in the United Kingdom in December 2000, with "Please Stay" as a B-side. A different promotional CDR was released on August 21, 2003, by Parlophone, in preparation for the upcoming holiday season. Minogue's version of "Santa Baby" was produced by Chong Lim and credited Javits and Phillip Springer as the writers. In November 2010, the cover was included on Minogue's extended play A Kylie Christmas, alongside a newly recorded cover of "Let It Snow". She released a different holiday-themed extended play in Europe titled A Christmas Gift, which featured two tracks from her eleventh studio album Aphrodite (2010) and closed with "Santa Baby".

On November 13, 2015, Minogue released her thirteenth studio album, and first Christmas album, titled Kylie Christmas. Her cover of "Santa Baby" was included in the project's track listing with Steve Anderson, the album's executive producer, being attributed as an additional producer. The A.V. Club's Caroline Framke compared Minogue's cover to Madonna's, suggesting that they channel similar "inner pin-up girl[s]".

=== Critical reception ===
In 2018, Billboard's Xavier Piedra listed Minogue's cover in a list of the ten best covers of "Santa Baby", writing: "Kylie Minogue's 'Santa Baby' cover remains very true to the original track. [...] This cover truly is an updated version of the classic that will not disappoint." Piedra also praised Minogue's vocal delivery for embodying the "cheekiness" of Kitt's original version. The Herald Sun's Cameron Adams described Minogue's version as an "old school, feel-good festive fave".

=== Commercial performance ===
With the inclusion of streaming data in chart tabulations in the late 2010s, Minogue's version of "Santa Baby" attained most of its commercial success nearly two decades after its initial release. It charted in Australia and various European countries. In the former region, Minogue's cover spent one week on the ARIA Singles Chart. After the release of A Kylie Christmas, "Santa Baby" debuted at number 85 for the week of December 27, 2010; her cover of "Let It Snow", the other track on A Kylie Christmas, charted closely to "Santa Baby" at number 89. In Germany, "Santa Baby" reached number 60 on the German Singles Chart. It also appeared on the Dutch Single Top 100 chart in the Netherlands, where it peaked at number 68. In Denmark, Minogue's cover did not reach the country's top 40 singles chart, but was issued a Gold certification from International Federation of the Phonographic Industry for shipments of 45,000 copies in that country. On the streaming component chart in Hungary, Minogue's cover of "Santa Baby" hit number 27. In Switzerland and on Sweden's Heatseeker chart, the song peaked at numbers 57 and 10, respectively.

Her cover achieved its highest-peaking position in the United Kingdom during the 2020–2021 Christmas season. On their singles chart, it debuted on the list dated December 16, 2007, at number 93, the same week that Kitt's original version entered at number 85. Minogue's cover later reached number 38 during the week of December 29, 2017, becoming Minogue's fiftieth top 40 entry, collectively. It reached a new peak at number 31 on the chart dated January 1, 2021. Her cover made a second appearance on the chart in 2010 when it was paired as a double A-side single with "Let It Snow"; the dual single charted at number 188 on Christmas Day. As of December 2019, her cover had sold 330,000 copies in the United Kingdom. It went on to receive a Platinum certification from the British Phonographic Industry in December 2021, denoting combined sales and shipments figures of 600,000 copies. In Ireland, her cover charted at number 52 in 2017 on the country's official single chart. It reappeared at number 56 the following year, which led Jack White from the Official Charts Company to predict that it would reach the top 50 in Ireland during 2019. It also entered the Ö3 Austria singles chart, peaking at number 67 during the chart dated January 4, 2019. As of 2021, Minogue's version of "Santa Baby" has earned in excess of £417,000 in streaming revenue.

=== Track listing ===
Promotional CD single
No.	Title	Length
1.	"Santa Baby"	3:23
2.	"Please Stay"	4:08

Promotional CD-R single
No.	Title	Length
1.	"Santa Baby"	3:23

=== Credits and personnel ===
Credits adapted from the liner notes of "Santa Baby".

- Kylie Minogue – performer
- Joan Javits – writer
- Philip Springer – writer
- Chong Lim – producer, arranger
- Steve Anderson – vocal production
- Doug Brady – engineer, mixer

=== Charts ===
Chart performance for "Santa Baby"
Chart (2000–2025)	Peak position
Australia (ARIA)	44
Austria (Ö3 Austria Top 40)	27
Croatia International Airplay (Top lista)	29
Germany (GfK)	23
Global 200 (Billboard)	89
Hungary (Stream Top 40)	27
Ireland (IRMA)	52
Lithuania (AGATA)	100
Netherlands (Single Top 100)	46
Portugal (AFP)	109
Romania Airplay (TopHit)	75
Sweden Heatseeker (Sverigetopplistan)	10
Switzerland (Schweizer Hitparade)	57
UK Singles (Official Charts)	31
UK Singles (Official Charts) with "Let It Snow" from A Kylie Christmas	188

=== Certifications ===
Certifications for "Santa Baby"
Region	Certification	Certified units/sales
Denmark (IFPI Danmark)	Platinum	90,000^{‡}
Germany (BVMI)	Gold	300,000^{‡}
New Zealand (RMNZ)	Gold	15,000^{‡}
United Kingdom (BPI)	Platinum	600,000^{‡}
^{‡} Sales+streaming figures based on certification alone.

=== Release history ===
Release dates and formats for "Santa Baby"
Region	Date	Format(s)	Label(s)	Ref.
United Kingdom	December 2000	Promotional CD single	Parlophone	
United Kingdom	August 21, 2003	Promotional CD-R single	Parlophone	

== Kellie Pickler version ==
"Santa Baby"

Promotional single by Kellie Pickler

from the album Hear Something Country Christmas
- Released: September 18, 2007
- Genre: Christmas
- Length: 3:27
- Label: 19
- Songwriters: Joan Javits; Phil Springer; Tony Springer
- Producer: Blake Chancey

Audio video
- "Santa Baby" on YouTube

=== Background and release ===
In 2007, American singer Kellie Pickler recorded a cover of "Santa Baby" for the country-themed compilation album, Hear Something Country Christmas. The song was released for digital download and streaming in North and South America on September 18, 2007, through 19 Recordings. Following the album's release, the song was distributed as a promotional CD single in the United States by BNA Records and Sony BMG Nashville in 2007. The CD featured three different radio edit versions of the song, including one with a cold ending. Pickler's cover of "Santa Baby" was produced by Blake Chancey and mastered by Joseph M. Palmaccio at The Place... For Mastering studios in Nashville.

Pickler's version of "Santa Baby" was described as a sultry Christmas song with a "classic arrangement [of] horns". According to the sheet music published at Musicnotes.com, her cover is set in the time signature of common time and has a moderately slow tempo of 86 beats per minute. The key of the song is in G major and Pickler's vocal range advances in the chord progression of G–Em–Am–D. Her voice spans one octave, from D_{4} to D_{5}.

Pickler's cover also made an appearance on the compilation Now That's What I Call a Country Christmas (2009) and the charity album, A Very Special Christmas 7 (2009). Proceeds from the latter album's sales benefitted Special Olympics. In 2010, Pickler was invited to appear as a guest musical act on the inaugural CMA Country Christmas television special. For the appearance, she performed her cover of "Santa Baby" while dressed in a red dress "and matching gloves". A contributor to the Country Music Family website lauded Pickler's performance, calling it enjoyable and fun to watch. They also enjoyed her vocals, writing that she "used the song to display her talents as a vocalist". David Drew from WUBE-FM referred to this performance of "Santa Baby" by Pickler as the song's official music video. On December 15, 2013, Pickler uploaded a promotional audio clip of the song to her Vevo YouTube channel.

=== Reception ===
Pickler's cover of "Santa Baby" was frequently labeled a standout by critics. Lea Weatherby from Mic included her version in a playlist of the best country Christmas songs. After listing several other covers of the song, she wrote: "Though Pickler had some pretty big boots to fill, this rendition gives the song the wholesome, southern charm it needed." Eric Cornish from WKDQ liked her cover, calling it hot. Drew also liked the song, finding it to be cute and including it on his annual list of "12 Days of Christmas Music". In 2012, Sterling Whitaker from Taste of Country named Pickler's version as one of the "Top 50 Country Christmas Songs" of all time. He called the song sexy, and sultry, and appreciated the classic-style arrangements.

Pickler's cover of "Santa Baby" reached two Billboard charts in the US. On December 8, 2007, the song debuted at number 49 on the Hot Country Songs chart, becoming the week's second-highest new entry after Taylor Swift's cover of "Last Christmas" (2007), which debuted at number 48. After rising for five weeks, it peaked at number 33 on the issue dated January 5, 2008. The song's performance was replicated exactly on the Country Airplay chart. On both charts, the song spent a total of six weeks appearing. As of December 2014, her version has sold approximately 140,000 digital downloads in the US.

=== Track listings and formats ===
Digital download/streaming
No.	Title	Length
1.	"Santa Baby"	3:27

Promotional CD single
No.	Title	Length
1.	"Santa Baby"	3:12
2.	"Santa Baby"	3:13
3.	"Santa Baby" (Cold ending)	3:27

=== Credits and personnel ===
Credits adapted from the liner notes of Hear Something Country Christmas and Tidal.

- Kellie Pickler – performer
- Joan Javits – composer, lyricist
- Phil Springer – composer, lyricist
- Tony Springer – composer, lyricist
- Blake Chancey – producer
- Joseph M. Palmaccio – mastering

=== Charts ===
Chart performance for "Santa Baby"
Chart (2008)	Peak position
US Country Airplay (Billboard)	33
US Hot Country Songs (Billboard)	33

=== Release history ===
Release dates and formats for "Santa Baby"
Region	Date	Format(s)	Label(s)	Ref.
North America	September 18, 2007	Digital download; streaming	19	
South America	September 18, 2007	Digital download; streaming	19	
United States	2007	Promotional CD single	BNA; Sony Music Nashville	

== Taylor Swift version ==
"Santa Baby"

Song by Taylor Swift

from the EP The Taylor Swift Holiday Collection
- Released: October 14, 2007
- Genre: Christmas
- Length: 2:41
- Label: Big Machine
- Songwriters: Joan Javits; Philip Springer; Tony Springer
- Producer: Nathan Chapman

Audio video
- "Santa Baby" on YouTube

Taylor Swift recorded a cover of "Santa Baby" for her first extended play, The Taylor Swift Holiday Collection (2007).

=== Reception ===
Dan MacIntosh from Country Standard Time liked Swift's cover, calling her version "sexy".

=== Charts ===
Chart performance for "Santa Baby"
Chart (2008–2015)	Peak position
US Hot Country Songs (Billboard)	43
US Country Airplay (Billboard)	43
US Holiday 100 (Billboard)	89
US Holiday Digital Song Sales (Billboard)	42
US Ringtones (Billboard)	37

== Michael Bublé version ==
"Santa Baby"

Song by Michael Bublé

from the album Christmas
- Released: December 12, 2011
- Genre: Christmas
- Length: 3:51
- Label: 143; Reprise
- Songwriters: Joan Javits; Philip Springer; Tony Springer
- Producers: David Foster; Courtney Blooding

Audio video
- "Santa Baby" on YouTube

Michael Bublé recorded a cover of "Santa Baby" for his seventh studio album, Christmas (2011). Bublé's version made extensive changes to the lyrics, including saying "Santa Buddy", "Santa Pally" and "Santa Poppy" instead of "Santa Baby".

The cover has been ranked consistently on lists of worst Christmas songs ever made. Richard Evans from Best Life included Bublé's version of "Santa Baby" in his list of "The Most Hated Christmas Songs of All Time", primarily for the changes in lyrics to ensure "everyone knows he is not attracted to Santa". Steve Eighinger listed Bublé's cover as number 6 on his list of the worst Christmas songs ever made.

=== Composition and structure ===
According to Musicnotes.com, Bublé's version has a time signature with a 12/8 feel and has a moderately slow tempo of 96 beats per minute. The key of the song is in F major, with Bublé's vocal range spanning from A_{2} to C_{4} in scientific pitch notation. The song progresses in the chord progressions of F–F/A–C in the first verses, followed by F-F/A-G-C.

=== Charts ===
Chart performance for "Santa Baby"
Chart (2011–2019)	Peak position
Australia (ARIA)	97
UK Singles (Official Charts)	192
US Holiday 100 (Billboard)	34
US Holiday Digital Song Sales (Billboard)	24
US Holiday Streaming Songs (Billboard)	4

=== Certifications ===
Sales and certifications for "Santa Baby"
Region	Certification	Certified units/sales
United Kingdom (BPI)	Silver	200,000^{‡}
^{‡} Sales+streaming figures based on certification alone.

== Ariana Grande and Liz Gillies version ==
"Santa Baby"

Single by Ariana Grande featuring Liz Gillies

from the EP Christmas Kisses
- Released: December 10, 2013
- Recorded: 2013
- Genre: Christmas
- Length: 2:51
- Label: Republic
- Songwriters: Philip Springer; Tony Springer; Joan Javits
- Producers: Kenneth "Babyface" Edmonds; Antonio Dixon; The Rascals

Ariana Grande singles chronology
"Snow in California" (2013)	"Santa Baby" (2013)	"Problem" (2014)

Liz Gillies singles chronology
"Santa Baby" (2013)	"We Wish You the Merriest" (2023)

Audio video
- "Santa Baby" on YouTube

On November 6, 2013, Ariana Grande announced via Twitter she would be releasing new music each week leading up to Christmas. On the fourth and final week she released a cover of "Santa Baby", which features Grande's former Victorious co-star Elizabeth Gillies (credited as Liz Gillies). It was distributed to digital retailers such as Amazon Music on December 10, 2013. It was then placed as the fourth and closing track to her first extended play, Christmas Kisses, which was released the same week.

=== Critical reception ===
Grande's version of "Santa Baby" received largely positive reviews from music critics. Jocelyn Vena from MTV enjoyed Grande's take on "Santa Baby", comparing it with Kitt's original version. Carolyn Menyes from Music Times ranked it as the best song on Christmas Kisses, awarding particular praise to its production and Grande and Gillies's chemistry. However, Menyes felt the mix of their vocals together could have been improved. Billboard's Piedra described the collaboration as a "fun duet" and an "experience like no other".

=== Chart performance ===
Grande's collaboration with Gillies enjoyed commercial success in several countries, reaching number 36 on the Holiday 100 in the United States.

=== Track listing ===
Digital download
No.	Title	Length
1.	"Santa Baby" (featuring Elizabeth Gillies)	2:51

=== Charts ===
Chart performance for "Santa Baby"
Chart (2013–2025)	Peak position
Australia (ARIA)	77
Czech Republic Singles Digital (ČNS IFPI)	76
Greece International Digital Singles (IFPI)	90
Hungary (Stream Top 40)	29
Netherlands (Single Top 100)	53
Portugal (AFP)	77
Slovakia Singles Digital (ČNS IFPI)	72
Sweden Heatseeker (Sverigetopplistan)	15
Switzerland (Schweizer Hitparade)	77
UK Singles (Official Charts)	155
US Holiday 100 (Billboard)	36

=== Certifications ===
Certifications for "Santa Baby"
Region	Certification	Certified units/sales
Australia (ARIA)	Gold	35,000^{‡}
Denmark (IFPI Danmark)	Gold	45,000^{‡}
New Zealand (RMNZ)	Gold	15,000^{‡}
United Kingdom (BPI)	Silver	200,000^{‡}
^{‡} Sales+streaming figures based on certification alone.

== Trisha Yearwood version ==
"Santa Baby"

Song by Trisha Yearwood

from the album Christmas Together
- Released: November 11, 2016
- Studio: Allentown Studios (Nashville)
- Genre: Christmas
- Length: 2:41
- Label: Gwendolyn; Pearl
- Songwriters: Joan Javits; Phil Springer; Tony Springer
- Producer: Mark Miller

Live video
- "Santa Baby" (CMA Country Christmas 2017) on YouTube

=== Background ===
Trisha Yearwood recorded a cover of "Santa Baby" for her collaborative album with husband Garth Brooks, Christmas Together (2016). The project was first unveiled in mid-October 2016 and was billed as the couple's first collaborative album, consisting of a combination of duets and solo works from both Yearwood and Brooks. "Santa Baby" does not feature a guest performance from Brooks but Yearwood is joined by Tania Hancheroff, Jon Mark Ivey, Shane McConnell, Lisa Silver, and Kira Small who provide backing vocals. Her cover, along with the rest of Christmas Together was released on November 11, 2016, by Gwendolyn Records and Brook's personal label, Pearl Records.

Brooks' long-time collaborator Mark Miller produced the track. Yearwood performed the track along with a cover of "Hard Candy Christmas" for the 2017 Christmas television special CMA Country Christmas.

=== Reception ===
Entertainment Tonight's Raphael Chestang wrote that "Yearwood shines on 'Santa Baby'", while a staff member at the Associated Press was glad that Yearwood had fun while recording the track. A writer for KNCI provided a positive review of Yearwood's cover, calling it "fun and flirty". MacIntosh from Country Standard Time agreed, lauding her vocals: "Yearwood sounds like a truly sexy hotty". Christopher Bohlsen from Renowned for Sound, on the other hand, panned the track, claiming that "Yearwood makes the mistake of trying to make Christmas sexy". He also compared it unfavorably to her cover of "Hard Candy Christmas" on Christmas Together, calling "Santa Baby" the weaker of the two songs.

In the United States, Yearwood's version of "Santa Baby" was released to adult contemporary radio stations. It reached Billboard's weekly Adult Contemporary chart, peaking at number 18 on January 6, 2017. It became her third entry on the chart and second-highest-charting effort after her cover of "Broken" peaked at number 17 in 2016. It also charted on Billboard's Country Airplay chart at number 60 during that same week.

=== Charts ===
Chart performance for "Santa Baby"
Chart (2017)	Peak position
US Adult Contemporary (Billboard)	18
US Country Airplay (Billboard)	60

== Gwen Stefani version ==
"Santa Baby"

Single by Gwen Stefani

from the album You Make It Feel Like Christmas
- Released: December 8, 2017
- Recorded: 2017
- Studio: Barefoot Studios (Los Angeles, CA); The Way Station (Beverly Hills, CA)
- Genre: Christmas
- Length: 2:54
- Label: Interscope
- Songwriters: Joan Javits; Philip Springer; Anthony Fred Springer
- Producers: busbee; Eric Valentine

Gwen Stefani singles chronology
"You Make It Feel Like Christmas" (2017)	"Santa Baby" (2017)	"Secret Santa" (2018)

Audio video
- "Santa Baby" on YouTube

=== Development and release ===
Following the release of her third studio album This Is What the Truth Feels Like (2016), Gwen Stefani announced in July 2017 that she had plans to release new music by the end of the year. She did not provide further details, but several publications speculated in August 2017 that Stefani's new material would be Christmas-related due to song titles such as "Christmas Eve", "Under the Christmas Lights", and "You Make It Feel Like Christmas" becoming registered on the two music databases, BMI and GEMA. On September 18, 2017, she took to her social media accounts and claimed that she "had something big planned for the holidays", and that more information would follow. The next day, Stefani announced her next studio album, You Make It Feel Like Christmas, as well as the track listing, which revealed a cover of "Santa Baby" as the album's ninth track.

One week prior to the release of You Make It Feel Like Christmas, Stefani's cover of "Santa Baby" was released as a promotional single. In the United States, Interscope Records released it for digital download and streaming on September 29, 2017. In Italy, it was released to radio stations on December 8, 2017, as the album's first single in that country. Stefani's version was produced by busbee and Eric Valentine, with Javits, Philip Springer, and Tony Springer (credited as Anthony Fred Springer in the album's liner notes) were listed as the songwriters. Her cover was engineered by Valentine, mixed by Dave Clauss, and Jonathan Sterling served as assistant engineer. Laura Mace, Monet Owens, and Dolly Sparks provided background vocals for the track with arrangements from Grace Potter. Sal Cinquemani from Slant Magazine described the style of Stefani's version as a hybrid of Kitt's original slow rendition and the revised uptempo one. Regarding her decision to cover "Santa Baby" for You Make It Feel Like Christmas, Stefani explained: "I haven't done many covers in my career, but this song feels like a perfect fit. What an extraordinary talent Phil Springer is. Eartha Kitt is so full of personality. This song must have been unbelievably edgy when it came out, and it still is."

"Santa Baby" was performed twice by Stefani during the 2017 holiday season. As part of a promotional campaign for You Make It Feel Like Christmas, Stefani appeared as a guest or performed on various television series in the US. On the November 20, 2017, episode of NBC's Today, Stefani was featured as a guest and performed "Santa Baby", "When I Was a Little Girl", and "Christmas Eve" to the studio audience. For the appearance, she wore a sleeveless white gown adorned by a dangly feather boa and sparkly jewelry. The same day, the taping of her mini concert was posted to Stefani's official YouTube channel and her separate Vevo account. The second time Stefani sang "Christmas Eve", she performed it on her Christmas television special Gwen Stefani's You Make It Feel Like Christmas, which was broadcast to NBC on December 12, 2017. She performed the song ahead of "Christmas Eve" and wore a sparkly Santa Claus-inspired outfit. Stefani was later joined by a Claus lookalike at the end of the performance. Emily Krauser from Entertainment Tonight enjoyed the outfit, saying that she "absolutely slay-belled the fashion game" during the special. The full video of "Santa Baby" from Stefani's televised special was uploaded to her YouTube channel on December 30, 2017.

=== Reception ===
Piedra from Billboard lauded Stefani's cover, stating that it "works perfectly with her incredibly unique voice". He also placed it within an unranked list of the ten best covers of "Santa Baby". David Smyth, a writer for London's Evening Standard, enjoyed Stefani's version "Santa Baby" and highlighted it as one of the stronger offerings on You Make It Feel Like Christmas. Roberts from the Los Angeles Times also approved of this version, calling it a "thoroughly modern take" and containing elements of both Kitt's version and Madonna's cover.

Following its promotional release in the United States, "Santa Baby" entered the Holiday Digital Song Sales chart in the US. On the edition for the week ending October 20, 2017, the song debuted and peaked at number 7, becoming the second-highest new entry from Stefani on that particular chart. Overall, it was her third highest-peaking song and one of sixteen consecutive top 40 hits on the chart. In Canada, Stefani's cover was sent to holiday radio playlists, allowing it to enter the country's Adult Contemporary chart in January 2018. It peaked at number 38, the same week that three other Stefani songs ("You Make It Feel Like Christmas" and her covers of "Jingle Bells" and "White Christmas") were ranked on the chart.

=== Track listing ===
Digital download/streaming
No.	Title	Length
1.	"Santa Baby"	2:54

=== Charts ===
Chart performance for "Santa Baby"
Chart (2017–2018)	Peak position
Canada AC (Billboard)	38
US Holiday Digital Song Sales (Billboard)	7

=== Release history ===
Release dates and formats for "Santa Baby"
Region	Date	Format(s)	Label(s)	Ref.
United States	September 29, 2017	Digital download; streaming	Interscope	
Italy	December 8, 2017	Contemporary hit radio	Universal Music Group	
Russia	January 19, 2021	Contemporary hit radio	Universal Music Group	

== Kim Kardashian version ==
"Santa Baby"

Single by Kim Kardashian
- Released: December 23, 2024
- Length: 3:29
- Label: DTA; Kimsaprincess, Inc.; Columbia
- Songwriters: Joan Javits; Philip Springer; Anthony Fred Springer
- Producer: Travis Barker

Kim Kardashian singles chronology
"Jam (Turn It Up)" (2011)	"Santa Baby" (2024)

Audio video
- "Santa Baby" on YouTube

=== Background and release ===
Kim Kardashian recorded a cover of "Santa Baby" during a season 3 episode of Hulu's The Kardashians show. She released it on December 23, 2024. Her rendition was produced by her brother-in-law Travis Barker, the husband of her sister Kourtney Kardashian. The release marked Kardashian's first new music release since her 2011 debut single "Jam (Turn It Up)". The song was released through Barker's DTA Records and Kardashian's Kimsaprincess, Inc. with distribution by Columbia Records

=== Composition and reception ===
Kardashian's rendition was described as having an "unorthodox, lofi quality to it" by The Independent's Greg Evans, as she performs the song in a "husky whisper". Billboard's Gil Kaufman thought the cover is a "sultry take on the Eartha Kitt standard". Janna Brancolini of The Daily Beast noted that "Santa Baby" is "far more stripped down" than "Jam (Turn It Up)", pointing out that the music "almost feels like an afterthought" of the music video, though. Eddie Fu of Consequence called the cover "awful" and "entirely unremarkable if not for the bizarre and disturbing music video".

=== Music video ===
The short film accompanying the song was released the same day. It was directed by Nadia Lee Cohen and Charlie Denis. The video, conceptualized as eerie house party footage with a glitchy, VHS-tape-like crackling quality, kicks off with Kardashian in a blonde bob wig slowly crawling across the floor on her hands and knees. She passes a donkey alongside a businessman making phone calls, a sleeping elf, women in their underwear on a Twister mat, a man dressed as Jesus raiding the fridge and more "surreal guests" and "absurd vignettes". A lit-up nativity is also seen in the background. She smolders in a blue top, beige leggings exposing her underwear and heels on her way to Santa Claus. When she reaches him and runs her fingers up his leg, the seated man moves the video camera away from his face to reveal the Home Alone (1990) star Macaulay Culkin, who stares at Kardashian with a blank expression before the video ends.

Brancolini thought that the video "seems to be a clear parody of the excesses of the holiday season. Using a glorified Skims commercial to make their point was probably intentional, though reasonable people can differ on whether making something meta is the same as thing as making it incisive. Unless the point was that just like Skims, consumerism is seductive, and in that sense Kardashian's curves are the perfect narrative vehicle." She also compared it to Bernardo Bertolucci's The Conformist (1970). Emily Zemler described the video for Rolling Stone as "David Lynch directing a Skims commercial." Writing for The Cut, Cat Zhang described the video as "sexy housewife of drug lord drops too much valium into her eggnog and crawls dizzily around the house", and wondered about the purpose of the project: "Is this all just an elaborate Skims advertisement or is Kim just a huge fan of Stanley Kubrick? (She nods to The Shining in the film.) Did North watch Home Alone for the first time?"

Riley Cardoza of Page Six dubbed the video "bizarre" and compared it with American Horror Story. Latoya Gayle of People described the video as "surreal versions of typical Christmas scenarios". Evans characterized the video as "creepy" and noted the fans' polarized reactions. Lindsay Lowe of Today, Kimberly Nordyke of The Hollywood Reporter and Logan DeLoye of iHeartRadio also pointed out the fans' polarized reactions.

"Santa Baby"

Song by aespa

== Aespa version ==
=== Background and release ===
Written by Joan Javits and Philip Springernin 1953, famously popularized by Eartha Kitt, the holiday classic "Santa Baby" has been covered by various artists over the decades.

On November 13, 2026, a cover of "Santa Baby" recorded by South Korean girl group Aespa was released during Christmas Holiday season. The track was provided by to streaming platforms by POPS Music Singapore under Primary Wave Music IV.
