= Just an Old Fashioned Girl =

Song by Eartha Kitt

from the album Thursday's Child
- Released: 1956 (album); November 1958 (UK single)
- Recorded: December 1955 – April 1956
- Genre: Traditional pop, novelty
- Length: 2:49
- Label: RCA
- Songwriter(s): Marve Fisher

"Just An Old Fashioned Girl" is a popular song written by Marve A. Fisher and best known in its 1956 recording by Eartha Kitt.

The song was recorded with Henri René and his orchestra, and was included on Kitt's RCA album Thursday's Child which she recorded between December 1955 and April 1956. Reviewer William Ruhlmann refers to the song as a "novelty... to exploit Kitt's promiscuous gold-digger image, as she wooed millionaires and their money." In 1958 the song was issued as a single in the UK, but failed to chart. It became a minor chart hit in Australia in 1963.

"Just An Old Fashioned Girl" became a cornerstone of Eartha Kitt's stage act, as her popularity developed around the world at the same time as her novel and provocative image became less of an attraction to US audiences. It became her signature tune in Britain, so much so that it is prominently mentioned in "The Cycling Tour," a Series 3 episode of Monty Python's Flying Circus. Some of the song's lyrics have been included in directories of quotations:

I'm just an old fashioned girl with an old fashioned mind
Not sophisticated, I'm the sweet and simple kind
I want an old fashioned house, with an old fashioned fence
And an old fashioned millionaire.

The song's lyricist and composer, Marvin A. "Marve" Fisher (June 21, 1907 – September 1, 1957), was an Illinois-born and Los Angeles–based writer of comic and novelty songs, including "Ring Those Christmas Bells", recorded by Peggy Lee and others, which Fisher co-wrote with Gus Levene. He is sometimes confused with another songwriter, Marvin Fisher (1916–1993), who wrote "When Sunny Gets Blue" and "Destination Moon", and was the son of Fred Fisher.
