= Uska Dara =

1953 song performed by Eartha Kitt

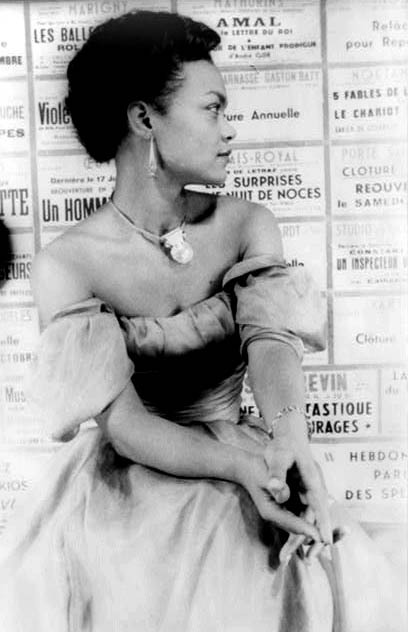
Portrait of Eartha Kitt

"Uska Dara" ("A Turkish Tale") is a 1953 song made famous by Eartha Kitt, and also recorded by Eydie Gormé. It is based on the Turkish folk song "Kâtibim" about a woman and her secretary traveling to Üsküdar. On early American recordings, this adaptation is credited to Stella Lee.

Kitt first heard the song "Kâtibim" at a local bar when she was in Istanbul as a member of the Katherine Dunham Company, and began performing it herself; the song received abundant play in Ankara Radio and became a hit. She then recorded "Uska Dara" with Henri René and his orchestra at Manhattan Center, New York City, on March 13, 1953. The song was released by RCA Victor Records as catalog number 20-5284 (in USA) and by EMI on the His Master's Voice label as catalog number B 10573. Kitt's recording sold 120,000 copies when it was first released by RCA Victor in 1953. Kitt later performed the song in the 1954 film New Faces, and included the song in her cabaret act, in which she culminated the number with a belly dance. The song appears on her albums RCA Victor Presents Eartha Kitt (1953) and That Bad Eartha (1955).

The 1978 disco song "Rasputin" by Boney M uses part of the melody of "Kâtibim", and mimics the line "Oh! those Turks" (as "Oh! those Russians") at the end of the song.
