= Henri René =

American musician (1906–1993)

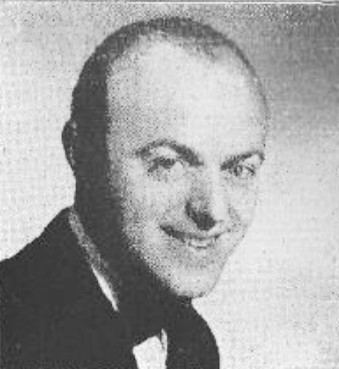
- René c. 1943

Background information
- Born: Harold Manfred Kirchstein; December 29, 1906; New York City, New York, U.S.
- Died: April 25, 1993 (aged 86) Houston, Texas, U.S.
- Genres: Classical music, opera, traditional pop, jazz, pop rock
- Occupations: Musician: Conductor, Composer, Arranger, Recording Artist, Record Producer
- Instruments: Saxophone, piano, musette accordion
- Labels: RCA Victor, Imperial

Henri René (born Harold Manfred Kirchstein; December 29, 1906 – April 25, 1993), was an American musician who had an international career in the recording industry as a producer, composer, conductor and arranger.

== Early years ==
Born in New York City of a German father and a French mother, young Harold traveled to Germany with his family, where he studied at the Royal Berlin Academy of Music.

== Artistic career ==
Returning to the U.S. in the mid-1920s, he appeared with several orchestras. After this, he returned once more to Berlin, working as a composer in the German film industry, and as an arranger with a German record label.

While touring Europe with his band some years before the war, he was appointed musical director of the two largest moving-picture firms in Europe, Tobis and UFA. In 1936, René returned to the U.S. and became musical director and chief arranger for RCA Victor, forming his own orchestra in 1941. As instrumentalist, René played the piano, saxophone, and Musette accordion.

He was responsible for the original "Beer Barrel Polka" disk, which played an important role in the development of the music machine to its present status as a powerful entertainment medium. Shortly after returning to the USA, he began recording regularly for Standard and became its No. 1 artist, his disks selling in quantities comparable to those of the largest commercial dance bands. Among his most successful records have been "Cuckoo Waltz," "Waltzing on the Kalamazoo," "Tap the Barrel Dry," "Pete, the Pickelman" and "Tommy's Mustache." After service with the Allies in World War II, he resumed working for RCA Victor as a conductor and arranger.

Henri René's recording of the Milton Delugg composition "Roller Coaster" was used as the closing theme for the Goodson-Todman Productions panel show What's My Line? from the early 1950s until its cancellation in 1967.

In the mid 1950s, he issued several successful LPs which Allmusic has called "forerunners of the space-age pop aesthetic"; among the albums were Music for Bachelors, Music for the Weaker Sex, Compulsion to Swing and Riot in Rhythm. René composed music themes and scores for several popular television series. After this René worked in production for RCA Victor, with Harry Belafonte, Perry Como, the Ames Brothers, Eartha Kitt and Dinah Shore among others. He left RCA Victor in 1959 to work freelance for the rest of his active career.

== Honours ==
For his contributions to the recording industry, René has a Star at 1610 Vine Street on the Hollywood Walk of Fame.

== Selected filmography ==
- Men Without a Fatherland (1937)
- Togger (1937)
