= Tricky =

Tricky may refer to:

== Arts and entertainment ==
- Tricky (TV series), a Saturday morning ITV children's television series
- Tricky TV, an ITV children's television magic series
- "Tricky", a song by Fitz and the Tantrums from their self-titled album
- Prince Tricky, a character in the Star Fox series of video games

== People ==
- Tricky (musician) (born 1968), English producer and trip hop musician
- Tricky Nichols (1850–1897), American baseball pitcher
- Tricky Stewart (born 1974), American music producer

== Other uses ==
- Tricky Hill, a summit in Missouri, US

== See also ==
- "Tricky, Tricky", a song by Lou Bega
- "It's Tricky", a song by Run-DMC
- SSX Tricky, the second game in the SSX series
- Trick (disambiguation)
- Tricky Business (disambiguation)
- Tricky Dicky (disambiguation)
