= Autarky =

Characteristic of self-sufficiency

Autarky is the characteristic of self-sufficiency, usually applied to societies, communities, states, and their economic systems.

Autarky as an ideology or economic approach has been attempted by a range of political ideologies and movements, particularly leftist ones like African socialism, mutualism, war communism, communalism, swadeshi, syndicalism (especially anarcho-syndicalism), and left-wing populism, generally in an effort to build alternative economic structures or to control resources against structures a particular movement views as hostile. However, some right-wing ones, like nationalism, conservatism, and anti-globalism, along with even some centrist and religious movements (such as Islamism), have also adopted autarky, generally on a more limited scale, to develop a particular industry, to gain independence from other national entities, or to preserve part of an existing social order.

Proponents of autarky have argued for national self-sufficiency to reduce foreign economic, political, and cultural influences, and to promote international peace. However, economists who support free trade instead argue that protectionism has a negative effect on economic growth and economic welfare, whereas free trade and the reduction of trade barriers have a positive effect on economic growth and economic stability.

Autarky may be a policy of a state or some other type of entity when it seeks to be self-sufficient as a whole, but it also can be limited to a narrow field such as possession of a key raw material. Some countries have a policy of autarky with respect to foodstuffs (such as South Korea), and water for national-security reasons. Autarky can result from economic isolation or from external circumstances in which a state or other entity reverts to localized production when it lacks currency or excess production to trade with the outside world.

== Etymology ==
The word autarky is from the Ancient Greek word Greek: αὐτάρκεια, which means "self-sufficiency" (derived from αὐτο-, "self", and ἀρκέω, "to suffice"). In Stoicism the concept of autarky represents independence from anything external, including independence from personal relationships, so as to immune one from vagaries of fortune. The Stoic sage is autarkic by being dependent only on his own virtue. In Epicureanism the concept of autarky represents having the fewest possible requirements for living a life of pleasure, free of pain (aponia).

Lexico, whose content is provided by the same publisher as that of the Oxford English Dictionary, says that autarky is a variant spelling of and pronounced the same as autarchy and that autarchy is another term for autocracy.

== History ==
=== Ancient and medieval ===
Early state societies that can be regarded as autarkic include nomadic pastoralism and palace economy, though over time these tend towards becoming less self-sufficient and more interconnected. The late Bronze Age, for example, saw formerly self-sufficient palace economies rely more heavily on trade, which may have been a contributing factor to the eventual Bronze Age Collapse when multiple crises hit those systems at once. After that collapse, the ideal of autarkeia formed a part of emerging Greek political culture, emphasizing economic self-sufficiency and local self-rule.

The populist Chinese philosophy of Agriculturalism, prominent in the Spring and Autumn and Warring States periods, supported egalitarian, self-sufficient societies as an antidote to rampant war and corruption.

During the Late Roman Empire, some rebellions and communities pursued autarky as a reaction both to upheaval and to counter imperial power. A prominent example is the Bacaude, who repeatedly rebelled against the empire and "formed self-governing communities" with their own internal economy and coinage.

Medieval communes combined an attempt at overall economic self-sufficiency through the use of common lands and resources with the use of mutual defense pacts, neighborhood assemblies and organized militias to preserve local autonomy against the depredations of the local nobility. Many of these communes later became trading powers such as the Hanseatic League. In some cases, communal village economies maintained their own debt system as part of a self-sufficient economy and to avoid reliance on possibly hostile aristocratic or business interests. The trend toward "local self-sufficiency" increased after the Black Plague, initially as a reaction to the impact of the epidemic and later as a way for communes and city states to maintain power against the nobility.

There is considerable debate about how autarkic cultures that resisted the spread of early capitalism were. Golden Age pirate communities have been dubbed both heavily autarkic societies where "the marauders...lived in small, self-contained democracies" and as an "anti-autarky" due to their dependence on raiding.

While rarer among imperial states, some autarkies did occur during specific time periods. The Ming dynasty, during its earlier, more isolationist period, kept a closed economy that prohibited outside trade and focused on centralized distribution of goods produced in localized farms and workshops. A hierarchy of bureaucrats oversaw the distribution of these resources from central depots, including a massive one located in the Forbidden City. That depot was, at the time, the largest logistical base in the world. The Incan Empire also maintained a system of society-wide autarky based on community levies of specific goods and "supply on command".

=== 19th and early 20th centuries ===
In some areas of the antebellum South, the enslaved and free black populations forged self-sufficient economies in an effort to avoid reliance on the larger economy controlled by the planter aristocracy. In eastern North Carolina maroon communities, often based in swampy areas, used a combination of agriculture and fishing to forge a "hidden economy" and secure survival. The relative self-reliance of these maritime African-American populations provided the basis for a strongly abolitionist political culture that made increasingly radical demands after the start of the Civil War. Due to tense relations with some Union commanders and political factions during and after that war, these communities "focused their organizing efforts on developing their own institutions, their own sense of self-reliance, and their own political strength".

Communist movements embraced or dismissed autarky as a goal at different times. Peter Kropotkin advocated local and regional autarky integrating agriculture and industry, instead of the international division of labor. His work repeatedly held up communities "that needed neither aid or protection from without" as a more resilient model.

Some socialist communities like Charles Fourier's phalansteries strove for self-sufficiency. The early USSR in the Russian Civil War strove for a self-sufficient economy with war communism, but later pursued international trade vigorously under the New Economic Policy. However, while the Soviet government during the latter period encouraged international trade, it also permitted and even encouraged local autarkies in many peasant villages.

Sometimes leftist groups clashed over autarkic projects. During the Spanish Civil War, the anarcho-syndicalist CNT and the socialist UGT had created economic cooperatives in the Levante that they claimed were "managing the economic life of the region independent of the government". But communist factions responded by cracking down on these cooperatives in an attempt to place economic control back in the hands of the central government.

Some right-wing totalitarian governments have claimed autarky as a goal, developing national industry and imposing high tariffs but have crushed other autarkic movements and often engaged in extensive outside economic activity. In 1921, Italian fascists attacked existing left-wing autarkic projects at the behest of large landowners, destroying roughly 119 labor chambers, 107 cooperatives and 83 peasant offices that year alone. Nazi Germany under economics minister Hjalmar Schacht, and later Walther Funk, still pursued major international trade, albeit under a different system, to escape the terms of the Treaty of Versailles, satisfy business elites and prepare for war. The regime would continue to conduct trade, including with countries like the United States, including connections with major companies like IBM and Coca-Cola.

=== After World War II ===
Economic self-sufficiency was pursued as a goal by some members of the Non-Aligned Movement, such as India under Jawaharlal Nehru and Tanzania, under the ideology of Ujamaa and Swadeshi. That was partly an effort to escape the economic domination of both the United States and the Soviet Union while modernizing the countries' infrastructure. In the case of Francoist Spain, it was both the effect of international sanctions after the Spanish Civil War (1939) and the Second World War and the totalitarian nationalist ideology of Falangism. Post-war famine and misery lasted longer than in war-ravaged Europe. It was not until the capitalist reforms of 1950s with the approach to the United States that the Spanish economy recovered the levels of 1935 launching into the Spanish Miracle.

In the latter half of the 20th century economists, especially in wealthier countries, backed the emerging Washington consensus, overwhelmingly endorsing free trade while discouraging autarkic and socialist policies. These economists asserted that protectionism has a negative effect on economic growth and economic welfare while free trade and the reduction of trade barriers has a positive effect on economic growth and economic stability. But economists from many developing nations, or who came from Marxian traditions, endorsed more autarkic ideas including import substitution industrialization and dependency theory. The work of Celso Furtado, Raul Prebisch and Samir Amin, especially Amin's semi-autarkic "autocentric" policies, proved influential in efforts by many countries in Latin America, Asia and Africa to stave off economic domination by developing more self-sufficient economies.

Small-scale autarkies were sometimes used by the Civil Rights Movement, such as in the case of the Montgomery Bus Boycott. Boycotters set up their own self-sufficient system of cheap or free transit to allow black residents to get to work and avoid using the then-segregated public systems in a successful effort to bring political pressure.

Autarkic efforts for food sovereignty also formed part of the civil rights movement. In the late 1960s, activist Fannie Lou Hamer was one of the founders of the Freedom Farms Cooperative, an effort to redistribute economic power and build self-sufficiency in Black communities. "When you've got 400 quarts of greens and gumbo soup canned for the winter, nobody can push you around or tell you what to say or do," Hamer summarized as the rationale for the cooperative. The efforts were extensively targeted by segregationist authorities and the far-right with measures ranging from economic pressure to outright violence.

After World War II, Autonomist efforts in Europe embraced local autarkic projects in an effort to craft anti-authoritarian left-wing spaces, especially influencing the social center and squatters' rights movements. Such efforts remain a common feature of Autonomist and anarchist movements on the continent today. The Micropolis social centre in Greece, for example, has gyms, restaurants, bars, meeting space and free distribution of food and resources.

Around 1970, the Black Panther Party moved away from orthodox communist internationalism towards "intercommunalism", a term coined by Huey P. Newton, "to retain a grasp on the local when the rest of radical thought seemed to be moving global". Intercommunalism drew from left-wing autarkic projects like free medical clinics and breakfast programs, "explicitly articulated as attempts to fill a void left by the failure of the federal government to provide resources as basic as food to black communities".

In Murray Bookchin's Communalist ideal, he wrote that in a more liberated future "every community would approximate local or regional autarky".

The influential 1983 anarchist book bolo'bolo, by Hans Widmer, advocated the use of autarky among its utopian anti-capitalist communes (known as bolos), asserting "the power of the State is based on food supply. Only on the basis of a certain degree of autarky can the bolos enter into a network of exchange without being exploited". Widmer theorized that through "tactical autarky" such communes would be able to prevent the return of oppressive structures and a money economy.

While autarky is not a formalized tenet of Islamism, many Islamist factions historically lean toward economic self-reliance and independence (Istiqlal). The drive for self-reliance is heavily tied to resisting Western economic hegemony and globalization, which are frequently viewed as exploitative. Some radical or state-led Islamist groups advocate the creation of closed, parallel trade networks solely among Muslim-majority nations (the Ummah) to achieve independence from Western financial institutions such as the IMF and the World Bank and prioritized heavy state control, domestic manufacturing and strict financial regulations.

Autarkic efforts to counter the forcible privatization of public resources and maintain local self-sufficiency also formed a key part of alter-globalization efforts. The Cochabamba Water War had Bolivians successfully oppose the privatization of their water system to keep the resource in public hands.

=== Contemporary ===
Today, national economic autarkies are relatively rare. A commonly-cited example is North Korea, based on the government ideology of Juche (self-reliance), which is concerned with maintaining its domestic localized economy in the face of its isolation. However, even North Korea has extensive trade with Russia, China, Algeria, Syria, Iran, Vietnam, India and many countries in Europe and Africa. North Korea had to import food during a widespread famine in the 1990s.

Some would consider a modern example at a societal level is Rojava, a former autonomous northern region of Syria. Despite a key alliance with the United States, supporters consider them largely cut off from international trade, facing multiple enemies, and striving for a society based on communalism, Rojava's government and constitution emphasize economic self-sufficiency directed by neighborhood and village councils. Rojavan society and economics are influenced by Bookchin's ideas, including the emphasis on local and regional self governance. Under changes made in 2012, property and business belong to those who live in or use it towards these goals, while infrastructure, land and major resources are commons run by local and regional councils. Bookchin, however, was concerned about the effects of isolationist autarky in respect to the closing off of a community, and therefore always stressed the need for a balance between localism and globalism.

An example of a contemporary effort at localized autarky, incorporating the concept's history from black nationalism, Ujamaa, African-American socialism and the civil rights movement, is Cooperation Jackson, a movement aimed at creating a self-sufficient black working class economy in Jackson, Mississippi. The movement has aimed to secure land and build self-sufficient cooperatives and workplaces "to democratically transform the political economy of the city" and push back against gentrification. Cooperation Jackson also saw a gain in electoral political power when its involvement proved pivotal to the 2013 mayoral election of Chokwe Lumumba and the 2017 election of his son, Chokwe Antar Lumumba.

== See also ==
- Autarchism
- Domestic sourcing
- Import substitution industrialization
- Mercantilism
- Protectionism
- Resistance economy
- Robinson Crusoe
- Swadeshi
- National Policy

== Bibliography ==
- Bookchin, Murray (2017). Urbanization Without Cities: The Rise and Decline of Citizenship. Montréal: Black Rose Books. ISBN 978-1551646237. OCLC 1046676911.
- Cecelski, David S. (2012). The Waterman's Song: Slavery and Freedom in Maritime North Carolina. London: University of Carolina Press. ISBN 978-1469602356. OCLC 605086965.
- Federici, Silvia (2004). Caliban and the witch. New York: Autonomedia. ISBN 1570270597. OCLC 53122730.
- P. M. (2011). Bolo'bolo (30th anniversary ed.). Brooklyn, NY: Autonomedia. ISBN 978-1570272417. OCLC 753622961.
