= Trick =

Trick(s) may refer to:

== People ==
- Trick McSorley (1852–1936), American professional baseball player
- Armon Trick (born 1978), retired German international rugby union player
- David Trick (born 1955), former Ontario civil servant and university administrator
- Marcus Trick (born 1977), retired German international rugby union player
- Stanley Arthur Trick (1884–1958), English cricketer for Essex
- Stephanie Trick (born 1987), American stride, ragtime and jazz pianist
- Trick Daddy (born 1974), American rapper and producer
- Trick-Trick (born 1973), Detroit rapper
- Junaid Hussain (1994–2015), British hacker and propagandist who used the alias TriCk

== Arts, entertainment, and media ==
=== Films ===
- Tricks (1925 film), American silent film
- Trick (1999 film), American gay romantic-comedy
- Tricks (1997 film), TV movie; see Jay Friedkin
- Tricks (2007 film), Polish film by Andrzej Jakimowski
- Trick (2010 film), Polish film by Jan Hryniak
- Trick (2019 film), American Halloween-themed horror film
- The Trick (film), a 2021 BBC film about the Climatic Research Unit email controversy
- Trick (2026 film), Italian film by Mario Martone

=== Literature ===
- Trick (novel), a 2015 novel by Natalia Jaster
- Tricks, a 1979 chronicle of homosexual encounters by Renaud Camus
- Tricks (novel), a 2009 novel by Ellen Hopkins

=== Music ===
- Trick-Trick (born 1973), Detroit rapper
- Stephanie Trick (born 1987), American stride, ragtime and jazz pianist
- Trick Daddy (born 1973), American rapper and producer

==== Albums ====
- Trick (Kumi Koda album), 2009
- Trick (Panic Channel album), 2005
- Trick (Kele Okereke album), 2014
- Trick (Jamie T album), 2016
- Tricks (ohGr album), 2018
- Trick (Alex G album), 2012

==== Songs ====
- "Trick", by Girls' Generation from The Boys, 2011
- "Trick", by IMx from Introducing IMx, 1999
- "Trick", by Saweetie from Icy, 2019
- "Trick (So Sweet)", by Seaway from Colour Blind, 2015
- "Tricks", by Falco from Wiener Blut, 1988
- "Tricks", by MC Breed from It's All Good, 1999
- "Tricks", by Tony Bennett from This Is All I Ask, 1963
- "The Trick", by AJR from OK Orchestra, 2021

=== Other uses in arts, entertainment, and media ===
- Magic trick, an illusion or act of misdirection
- Trick (TV series), a comedic Japanese television drama
- Trick McCorrigan, a fictional character in the Canadian television series Lost Girl
- Stop trick, a simple film special effect

== Sports and games ==
- Trick, skill, or element, a maneuver in various sports:
  - Trick, an acrobatic move performed in an acro dance
  - Juggling trick, a maneuver performed while juggling
  - Skateboarding trick, a maneuver performed on a skateboard
  - Trick shot, a shot played on a billiards table, which seems unlikely or impossible, or requires significant skill
  - Trick shooting, a sport in which a marksman performs various feats of skill, frequently using non-traditional targets
- Tricking, a martial arts-based sport with emphasis on aesthetics
- Hat-trick, in sports, succeeding at anything three times in three consecutive attempts, or three times in one game
- Trick-taking game, a type of card game
- The Center fork trick, arising from the Italian Game or Four Knights Game

== Other uses ==
- Trick (nautical term)
- Trick, or john, a person who pays for prostitution (in slang "Turn a trick"), process referred to as "Trickin"
- Sex trick, another term for a unique sexual position
- Trick, a neat or unexpected solution in computer programming
- Confidence trick, a trick performed by a con artist

== See also ==
- Hat trick (disambiguation)
- Trichomoniasis or trich, a sexually transmitted infection
- Trick-or-treating, an activity for children on Halloween
- Tricked
- Tricky (disambiguation)
- Trix (disambiguation)
