= Tracy Sugarman =

American illustrator (1921–2013)

Tracy A. Sugarman
Biographical details
- Born: November 14, 1921; Syracuse, New York
- Died: January 20, 2013 (aged 91); Compo Beach, Connecticut
- Education: Syracuse University (1943)

Accomplishments and honors

Awards
- Society of Illustrators, New York, New York, The Art Directors Club, Washington, D.C., Town of Westport, Connecticut, Lifetime Achievement in Art Award (1998)

Tracy A. Sugarman (November 14, 1921 – January 20, 2013) was an American illustrator who illustrated numerous books, magazines and record covers in a professional career that lasted more than 50 years.

== Early life ==
Sugarman was born and raised in Syracuse, New York, the son of David Bernard Sugarman, a trial attorney, and Golda Sophian Sugarman. He attended Nottingham High School and Syracuse University, earning a bachelor's degree in fine arts in May 1943. During his junior year in college, Sugarman joined the U.S. Navy Reserve.

== Military service ==
After graduating from Syracuse, Sugarman attended Midshipman's School at Notre Dame University, where he received an officer's commission and the rank of ensign. He served as a Landing Craft Vehicle Personnel (LCVP) officer on Utah Beach during the June 6, 1944, D-Day invasion at Normandy, France. After nearly six months of duty on Normandy, Sugarman spent the remainder of the war serving on Landing Ship Tank 357.

== Artistic career ==
Following his World War II service, Sugarman and his wife, June, moved to Westport, Connecticut, and embarked on a career in illustration. He initially illustrated books and magazine articles before earning commissions in other fields, including television and industry.

He was also an illustrator of record covers, primarily for Waldorf Music Hall Records/Grand Award Records. He designed more than 100 covers between 1950-1959, including the covers for albums by "Knuckles O'Toole," a ragtime piano player for the Grand Award company. In 1961, he created illustrations for "The Feeling of Jazz," a book by George Simon. Besides an illustrator, he was also an artist, scriptwriter, civil rights activist, producer, and author.

Among his published works is “My War: A Love Story in Letters and Drawings.” The 2000 memoir is a collection of letters, drawings and watercolors he sent to his wife, during his World War II service. The collection was later acquired by the Veterans History Project at the Library of Congress.

As a visual journalist, he covered the appalling conditions in the Rikers Island jail for the New York Times and the Malcolm X trial for the Saturday Evening Post. His painting, "The Heroes of Nine-Eleven," is on permanent display in Washington, D.C. Another on the rollout of the Space Shuttle Columbia is part of NASA's pictorial history at Cape Kennedy.

== Civil rights involvement ==
Some of his most iconic illustrations involved the civil-rights movement in the 1960s. Sugarman recalls his experiences as a volunteer in the 1964 Mississippi voting registration drive, also known as the Mississippi Summer Project, as part of the 2023 Peabody Award-winning documentary "Freedom Summer," which appeared on PBS' American Experience. "My motivation for drawing was I wanted to make sure that I was capturing the flavor of a moment, the intensity of a moment. That happened to me twice in my life. One was on D-Day. And the other was in Mississippi." He spent several weeks in Ruleville, Mississippi, where he met local activists Fannie Lou Hamer and Charles McLaurin.

In 1969, Sugarman was one of the principals behind Rediscovery Productions which he formed to produce documentary films about often overlooked black contributors who enriched American society. One of its projects was "Never Turn Back: The Life of Fannie Lou Hamer," in 1980.

Stranger at the Gates, published in 1966, is Sugarman's personal account of that summer, illustrated with dozens of his evocative drawings. In the preface he wrote, "No one who went to Mississippi in 1964 returned the same. I came home from the dusty roads of the Delta with a deeper understanding of patriotism, an unshakable respect for commitment, and an abiding belief in the power of love."

We Had Sneakers, They Had Guns, published in 2009, is a sequel to his earlier work in which Sugarman reflected on the relationships formed that summer and how his life and the lives of his fellow volunteers were shaped by their experiences. It is both a personal memoir and a collective biography of the people he met in Mississippi.

== Later works ==
Prior to his death at the age of ninety-one, Sugarman completed his first novel, Nobody Said Amen, the fictional story of two Mississippi families, one black and one white, coping with the turbulent changes brought by the Civil Rights Movement.

== Personal life ==
Sugarman married June Feldman, a Syracuse University classmate, on September 24, 1943. The couple were married for 55 years and had two children. After June's sudden death from a heart attack in 1998, he married Gloria Cole, a former journalist, on October 17, 2000.
