= Willie "the Lion" Smith =

American jazz and stride pianist (1893–1973)

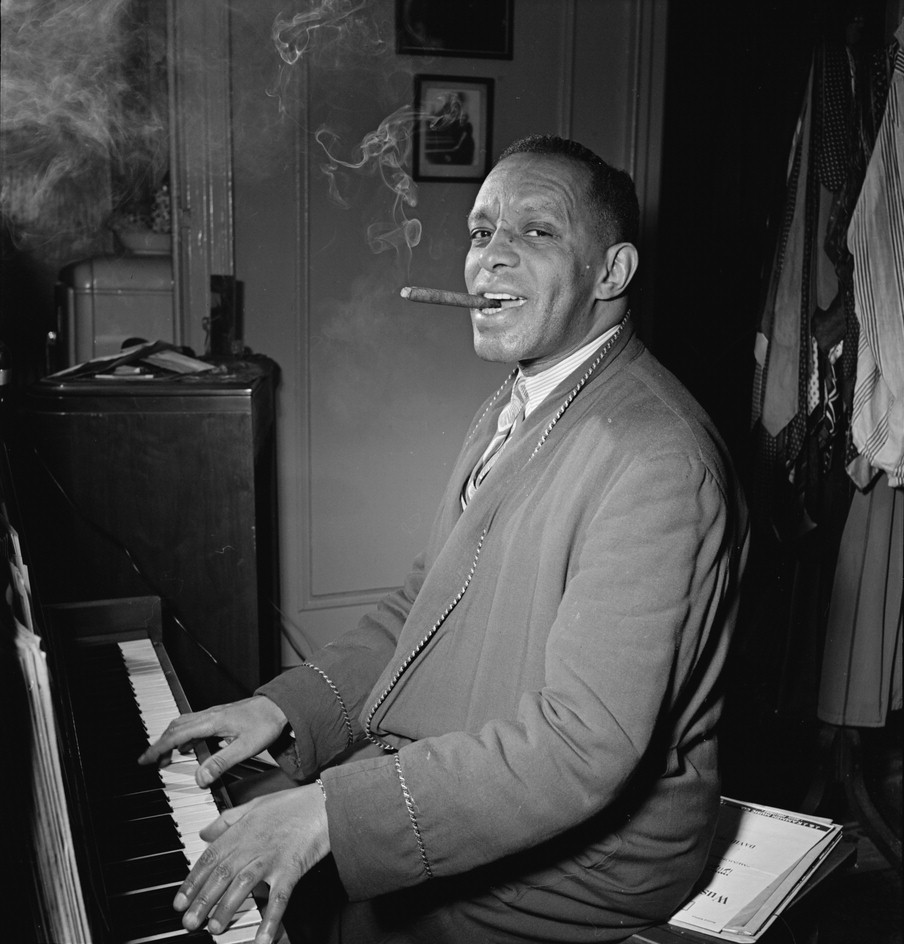
- Smith, c. January 1947; by William P. Gottlieb

Background information
- Born: William Henry Joseph Bonaparte Bertholf; November 23, 1893; Goshen, New York, U.S.
- Died: April 18, 1973 (aged 79) New York City, U.S.
- Genres: Jazz; stride; blues
- Occupation: Musician
- Instrument: Piano
- Spouse: Blanche Merrill (m. 1915; sep. 1917)
- Military career
- Allegiance: United States
- Branch: United States Army
- Service years: 1916–1919
- Rank: Corporal
- Units: 92nd Infantry Division; 350th Field Artillery
- Conflicts: World War I; Western Front

William Henry Joseph Bonaparte Bertholf Smith (November 23, 1893 (Note: Sometimes given as November 25, 1897.) – April 18, 1973), nicknamed "the Lion", was an American jazz and stride pianist.

== Early life and education ==
William Henry Joseph Bonaparte Bertholf, known as Willie, was born in 1893 in Goshen, New York. His mother and grandmother chose his names to reflect different parts of his heritage: Joseph after Saint Joseph (the Bible), Bonaparte (French), and Bertholf (his biological father's last name). William and Henry were added for "spiritual balance". When he was aged three, his mother married John Smith, and Smith was added as the boy's surname, after his stepfather.

In his memoir, Smith reports that his father, Frank Bertholf (incorrectly spelled "Bertholoff" in many sources), was Jewish. Smith's New York birth record shows him as William H. Bertholf, with father, Frank Bertholf, an electrician from nearby Monroe, New York. (Note: Found in the 1880 United States census under the misspelled "Bortholf" and correctly in 1900 under "Bertholf". Frank Bertholf was shown as single in the 1900 census, calling into question whether or not he was legally married to Ida Oliver.) Smith became at least somewhat conversant in Yiddish and studied Hebrew with children of a Jewish family who were clients of his mother's. He made his bar mitzvah at age 13 in Newark, New Jersey.

His mother, Ida Oliver, had "Spanish, Negro, and Mohawk Indian blood". Her mother, Ann Oliver, was a banjo player and had been in Primrose and West minstrel shows (Smith also had two cousins who were dancers in the shows, Etta and John Bloom). According to Ida, "Frank Bertholoff [sic] was a light-skinned playboy who loved his liquor, girls, and gambling." She threw Frank out of the house when their son, Smith, was two years old. After Frank Bertholf died in 1901, his mother married John Smith, a master mechanic from Paterson, New Jersey. When Willie Smith was three, his mother and stepfather added the surname Smith to his legal name. He grew up in a large family with his mother and stepfather in Newark at 76 Academy Street.

John Smith worked for C. M. Bailey, Pork Packers, and he would leave the house around midnight to pick up freshly killed pigs and take them to the packing house. He was supposed to be home by 4 am, but would usually go to bars after work. Eventually, Ida tasked the younger Smith with accompanying his stepfather to work in order to encourage him to come straight home and not go drinking. Smith said he enjoyed this task, but most of the time he had to drive the horses home. He only worked on Fridays and Saturdays, as his mother did not want him to miss school.

He later wrote in his memoir about being at the slaughterhouse with his stepfather:

I couldn't stand to see what I saw at the slaughterhouse. I would watch wide-eyed as the squealing pigs slid down the iron rails to the cutter where they were slashed through the middle, with the two halves falling into a tank of hot water. The kill sometimes went to as many as four hundred pigs a night. It was a sickening sight to watch. But the cries from the pigs brought forth an emotional excitement. It was another weird but musical sound that I can still hear in my head. The squeaks, the squeals, the dipping them in hot water, they put them on a hook, take off the head, the legs, going down an aisle—I hear it on an oboe. That's what you hear in a symphony: destruction, war, peace, beauty, all mixed.

In 1907, the family moved to 90 Bloome Street in Newark. They moved again around 1912, when his stepfather got a new job at the Crucible Steel Company, across the Passaic River in Harrison, New Jersey. The job paid more, and Smith was assigned to get him away from work before his bosses got him drunk on his own money.

He attended the Baxter School, rumored to be a school for bad children. The school was notorious for brawls among the ethnic Irish, Italian, and African-American children. One day, Smith was in Mrs. Black's fruit store and was caught with his hand in her register. According to his memoir, Smith had wanted to borrow a dime to see S. H. Dudley's traveling road show at Blaney's Theater. The owner shocked Smith by turning him over to the police. Mrs. Black's son-in-law was the number-three tough guy in Newark; reportedly, the family hated policemen and generally would not allow them into their store. Smith was charged in children's court and sentenced to a ten dollar fine and probation.

After that incident, he was transferred to Morton School (which had a lot less brawling) and began sixth grade. He attended Newark High School (now known as Barringer High School). In an effort to get the attention of girls, he attempted a variety of sports, including swimming, skating, track, basketball, sledding, cycling, and boxing. He learned how to swim in the Morris Canal.

Prizefighting was the sport he was most interested in. Smith has said that "maybe that because I've known most of the great fighters from way back. They liked to visit the night clubs". He got to kid around with Jack Johnson, Jack Dempsey, Battling Siki, Kid Chocolate, Sam Langford, Joe Gans, Bob Fitzsimmons, Harry Greb, Joe Louis, and Gene Tunney. Fitzsimmons owned a saloon on Market Street in Newark. It was where Smith learned about Stanley Ketchel, Kid McCoy, Benny Leonard, Jimmy Britt, and Charlie Warner.

Smith also joined a gang; their club was called The Ramblers (two members were Abner Zwillman and Niggy Rutman). He was one of two African Americans in the gang; the other was Louis Moss, who Smith called a "sweet talker, who could take his foes apart". Moss later became known as "Big Sue" and owned a saloon in the Tenderloin, Manhattan. Moss acted as his own bouncer at his club (according to Smith, Moss was 6 ft 4 in (1.93 m) and around 240 pounds). Smith used to play piano in his back room to help him out.

== Music career and military service ==
Around age six, Smith discovered an organ in the lower house, which his mother used to play. It had deteriorated and nearly half the keys were missing. After his mother saw he was interested in it, she taught him the melodies she knew. One of the first songs he learned was "Home! Sweet Home!". His uncle Rob, a bass singer who ran his own quartet, taught Smith how to dance. The boy entered an amateur dance contest at the Arcadia Theater and won first place, including a prize of ten dollars. After that, he focused more on playing music at the clubs.

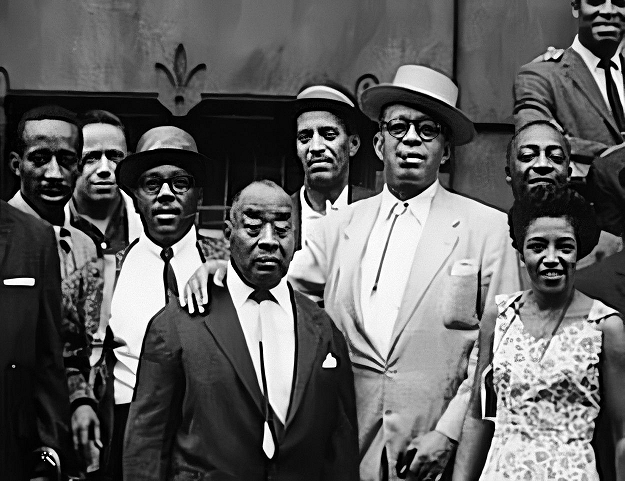
Smith (sixth from left) with Luckey Roberts (fourth from left) in 1958; by Art Kane

Smith had wanted a new piano very badly, but every time he thought his mother was able to afford it, there was a new mouth to feed. Smith got a job at Hauseman's Footwear store shining shoes and running errands, where he was paid five dollars a week. "Old Man" Hauseman paid that much because he was pleased that Smith could speak Yiddish and also because Smith wanted to buy a piano with the money. As it turned out, the piano sellers Marshall & Wendell's was holding a contest: the objective was to guess how many dots there were in a printed circle in their newspaper advertisement. Smith used arithmetic to help guess the number, won, and was delivered an upright piano the next day. He played the piano from then on. He would play songs he heard in the clubs, including "Maple Leaf Rag" by Scott Joplin, "Cannonball Rag" by Joe Northrup, "Black and White Rag" by George Botsford, and "Don't Hit that Lady Dressed in Green", about which he said, "the lyrics to this song were a sex education, especially for a twelve year old boy." His other favorites picked up from the saloons were "She's Got Good Booty" and "Baby, Let Your Drawers Hang Low".

By the early 1910s, Smith was playing at clubs in New York City and Atlantic City, New Jersey. He served in World War I, where he saw action in France. He also played the drum in the African-American regimental band led by James Tim Brymn called "The Black Devils", and basketball with the regimental team. Legend has it that his nickname "the Lion" came from his reported bravery while serving as a heavy artillery gunner. Smith recalled,

When they asked for volunteers to fire the French 75, I stepped forward. French Captain-in-Charge told us, "Well, I think it will take you a month to learn the mechanisms, and then we'll shoot you up to the front." I learned that mechanism in six hours. They tabbed me as an A-1 gunner right off the bat. I shot those 75s at the Fritzies for forty-nine days straight without a break or any relief. Word got back and the Colonel came up and said, "Smith, you're a lion with that gun." That name stuck with me ever since.

He was a decorated veteran of the 350th Field Artillery, a regiment of the 92nd Infantry Division ("Buffalo Soldiers").

Around 1915, he married Blanche Merrill (née Howard). Smith and Merrill are thought to have separated before Smith joined the Army in 1916, where he served as a corporal. However, they were listed in the 1920 census as living together in Newark, New Jersey. Merrill was white, and Smith was the only man in their apartment building who was classified as black on this census.

He returned to working in Harlem clubs and at "rent parties". Smith, and his contemporaries James P. Johnson and Fats Waller, developed a new, more sophisticated piano style later called "stride".

In the 1940s, his music found appreciation with a wider audience. Smith toured North America and Europe up to 1971. To leave the U.S., he needed a birth certificate; he went to the Orange County Courthouse to find it and discovered that it stated his birth date as November 25, in contradiction to his mother telling him he was born on November 23.

== Personal life ==
Smith had 10 brothers and a sister (including half-siblings). His older brother Jerome died at the age of 15. Another older brother, George, became an officer in Atlantic City and died in 1946. Smith said of George, "Our paths didn't cross very often in later life. His friends and connections were always on the other side of the fence from mine." His half-brother Robert owned a bar on West Street in Newark. His half-brother Melvin lived on Mulberry Street in Manhattan. Smith had no idea what became of his other two half-brothers, Norman and Ralph. His other siblings died as children, ranging from ages of three to seven.

As a boy, Smith delivered clean clothes to his mother's clients, of whom included a prosperous Jewish family who invited him to sit in on Hebrew lessons on Saturday mornings. Smith made his bar mitzvah in Newark at age 13. Later in life, he worked as a Hebrew cantor for a congregation in Harlem.

== Death ==
In his later years, Smith received frequent honors for his life's work, including a Willie "the Lion" Smith Day in Newark, New Jersey. He died at the age of 79 on April 18, 1973, in New York.

== Legacy ==
The liner notes of his 1958 LP The Legend of Willie "The Lion" Smith (Grand Awards GA 33-368) state, "Duke Ellington has never lost his awe of the Lion's prowess." It quotes Ellington as saying, "Willie the Lion was the greatest influence of all the great jazz piano players who have come along. He has a beat that stays in the mind." This LP's cover, features a painting of Smith by Tracy Sugarman. Ellington attested to his admiration when he composed and recorded "Portrait of the Lion" in 1939.

In 2012, Edward Diana, the County Executive of Orange County, New York, issued a proclamation declaring September 18 Willie "the Lion" Smith Day in Orange County, the date of the first Goshen Jazz Festival.

== Discography ==
- 1925–37: Chronological (Classics)
- 1937–38: Chronological (Classics)
- 1938–40: Chronological (Classics)
- 1944–49: Chronological (Classics)
- 1950: Chronological (Classics)
- 1950–53: Chronological (Classics)
- 1957: Accent on Piano (Urania, 1957)
- 1957: Dixiecats, Dixieland All Stars (Roulette, 1957)
- 1957.08: The Legend of Willie "the Lion" Smith (Grand Award, 1959)
- 1957.11: The Lion Roars (Dot, 1958)
- 1958: Luckey & the Lion: Harlem Piano (Good Time Jazz, 1960)
- 1958: Luckey & the Lion: Harlem Piano (Good Time Jazz, 1960)
- 1966.11: Music On My Mind (SABA, 1966)
- 1966.11: Pork and Beans (Black Lion, 1972)
- 1967.04: The Memories of Willie "The Lion" Smith (Victor)
- 1967.02: Grand Piano: Virtuoso Duets by Willie Smith & Don Ewell (Swaggie, 1966)
- 1970.06: Live at Blues Alley (Chiaroscuro, 1973)
- 1970-71: Relaxing (Chiaroscuro, 1977)
- 1971.02: Willie the Lion and His Washington Cubs (Fat Cat's Jazz, 1971)
- 1972.02: The Lion and the Tiger (Jazz Odyssey)
- 1972.06: The Lion, the Tiger and the Madelon (Jazz Odyssey)

The following albums are contained in the Chronological Classics series:

- 1949: Willie "the Lion" Smith (GNP Crescendo, 1972) – Vogue sessions
- 1949: The Lion (Vogue, 1966)
- 1949–50: Memorial (Vogue, 1960)
- 1950: Piano Solos by Willie Smith, the Lion of the Piano: Original Compositions (Commodore, 1961)
- 1950: Piano Solos by Willie Smith, the Lion of the Piano: Show Time (Commodore, 1962)
- 1950: A Legend (Mainstream, 1965) – Commodore sessions

== See also ==
- List of ragtime composers
- List of people from Harlem
