= ABC Records =

American record label

- Parent company: American Broadcasting Company
- Founded: 1955; 71 years ago
- Defunct: 1979; 47 years ago
- Status: Sold to MCA Records: Defunct
- Distributors: Self-distributed (US), EMI (international), Anchor Records (UK), Sparton Records (Canada), Polydor Records (Canada), GRT (Canada)
- Genre: Various
- Country of origin: United States
- Location: New York City

ABC Records was an American record label founded in New York City in 1955. It originated as the main popular music label operated by the Am-Par Record Corporation. Am-Par also created the Impulse! jazz label in 1960. It acquired many labels before ABC was sold to MCA Records in 1979. ABC produced music in a variety of genres: pop, rock, jazz, country, rhythm and blues, soundtrack, gospel, and polka. In addition to producing records, ABC licensed masters from independent record producers, and purchased regionally released records for national distribution.

The label was initially called Am-Par Records (1955), but quickly changed to ABC-Paramount Records (1955–1966), and then renamed ABC Records in 1966.

== History ==
=== Background ===
In the 1940s and early 1950s, the Federal Communications Commission took action against the Anti-competitive practices of movie studios and broadcasting companies, forcing the Radio Corporation of America (RCA) to sell the Blue Network, the sister network of NBC Red Network, in 1943. The Blue Network was purchased by Edward J. Noble, who changed the company's name to the American Broadcasting Company (ABC) in 1946. In 1953, ABC merged with United Paramount Theatres, the divested former exhibition/cinema division of Paramount Pictures, with the newly-merged corporation, American Broadcasting-Paramount Theatres (AB-PT) chaired by former Paramount Theaters executive Leonard Goldenson and headquartered at 1501 Broadway in New York City, above the Paramount Theater in Times Square.

=== ABC-Paramount Records ===
ABC Paramount 78rpm record and original sleeve

American Broadcasting-Paramount Theatres formed a records division, incorporating the Am-Par Record Corporation on June 14, 1955 with Samuel H. Clark as its first president. By August 1955, the unit was organized with AMPCO (ASCAP) and PAMCO (BMI) as subsidiary publishing units. Though the record label was established as Am-Par, no records were released until after the division's name was changed to ABC-Paramount in September 1955.

Eydie Gorme was the company's first signed artist. The company recorded its first single record, "Sincerely Yours" and "Come Home", both by Gorme. Alec Templeton's "Smart Alec" was the company's first LP recorded, also in September 1955.

One of Gorme's singles was its first release in January 1956. "Chain Gang" by Bobby Scott in February 1956 was the company's first national hit. George Hamilton IV's "A Rose and a Baby Ruth" single was Am-Paramount's first million-selling single in October 1956.

In 1957, the company had two million-selling singles: in June with "Diana" by Paul Anka and in October with "At the Hop" by Danny & the Juniors. Am-Paramount Records in May 1958 debuted the Apt subsidiary label with its first million-selling single, "Little Star" by the Elegants, released the same month.

Chancellor Records had Am-Par Record Corporation handle its distribution starting in 1957 and started a trend.

Am-Par purchased Grand Award Records including the newly formed Command Records label, in 1959. The company started a second label for jazz, Impulse! Records, in November 1960. Impulse released its first four records in January 1961.

The company had artists that earned three Grammy Awards in 1960. While in January 1961, the company purchased Westminster Records, a classical label. Thus Am-Par Record had a label for each music genre.

Am-Par Record Corporation was renamed to ABC-Paramount Records, Inc. on December 7, 1961. The company opened a Los Angeles office in January 1962. Ray Charles formed Tangerine Records in March 1962 and arranged for ABC-Paramount to distribute Tangerine's records. The company formed Jet Record Distributors based in Long Island City, N.Y. as its local distributor. Also in 1962, the company had acquired Music Guild label and library for Westminster Records.

In 1965, Clark was promoted to vice-president in charge of AB-PT's non-broadcast operations. National sales manager Larry Newton was named ABC-Paramount president. On January 4, 1965, vice-president in charge of sales Larry Newton was promoted to president of ABC-Paramount Records. The previous president, Sam Clark was promoted to director of theater operations for American Broadcasting-Paramount Theatres. Newton's first action as president was to restart Apt Records as a teen-oriented West Coast base label under Irwin Garr.

=== Apt Records ===
Apt Records was a sub-label from ABC-Paramount Records. The label was started in 1958 and released only singles until it was shelved in 1966. ABC briefly reactivated Apt twice, in 1969 and 1972, and also used the Apt name on a line of budget-priced 8-track and cassette tapes in 1970. The name was derived from ABC-Paramount's parent company, American Broadcasting-Paramount Theatres.

Label variants included:

- 1958-1966: Black label with multi-color logo at top
- 1965: Black and white label with new logo at left (in conjunction with the above label)
- 1969-1972: Yellow label with orange APT logo and "abc RECORDS" logo at top

=== ABC Records ===
In June 1966, the label was renamed ABC Records, and the company acquired New Deal Record Service Corp., a rack-jobbing and record distribution company, along with its affiliates.

In 1967, Dunhill Records was purchased from Lou Adler. In 1970, ABC and Dunhill moved its headquarters to Los Angeles. Newton was promoted to vice-president in charge of ABC Pictures. Dunhill co-owner Jay Lasker was named president and referred to the combined operations as ABC/Dunhill. At that time ABC had another five labels: Westminster, Command, Probe, Impulse!, and Bluesway.

At the August 29, 1970 Directors Guild meeting, ABC/Dunhill launched a number of marketing initiatives. The company planned to have writers create a broader music for the catalog market. Imprints Probe and Apt were relaunched, Probe as a label which held the international rights to ABC's albums and Apt as a label which released budget cassettes and 8-track tapes. Jazz dropped from Impulse!'s cover for a new slogan: "University Series of Fine Recordings" and two new series were launched: Audio Treasury and Westminster Gold for classic and youth fare, respectively.

By May 1972, ABC formed the ABC Leisure Group, which included ABC Records, Anchor Records, and ABC Records and Tape Sales, plus a new retail record-store division. Lasker left ABC to join Ariola America Records in 1975. He was succeeded by Jerry Rubinstein, who served as company head until 1977. In November 1972, ABC bought country music company Cartwheel Records.

In 1974, ABC switched British distribution from EMI to the EMI-distributed Anchor Records, allowing ABC recordings to be issued on the ABC label in the UK, and Anchor records to be distributed by ABC on the Anchor label in the US. Also in 1974, ABC acquired Famous Music Records Group including Nashville based Dot Records then began releasing ABC country music under the ABC/Dot label until January 1979.

In December 1977, Don Biederman was appointed vice president of legal affairs and administration and Richard Green was appointed vice president of business affairs at ABC Records.

As a cost-cutting measure, ABC Records discarded many master tapes in the 1970s to save storage space. When these recordings were reissued on compact disc in the 1980s, CD versions were often taken from master copies which had less than optimal sound quality. The company's last president, Steve Diener, was named to that job in 1977 after serving as head of ABC Records' international division. Because of financial problems except for its Nashville office, ABC Records was sold on January 31, 1979, to MCA Records with ABC Records being its third label likely under a different name. Instead, MCA discontinued ABC Records on March 5, 1979, and albums in the ABC catalog still selling well were reissued on MCA.

Diener died in April 2019, aged 80.

== Acquisitions ==
ABC Records sub-labeled Apt to release singles. In the early 1960s, it bought Westminster, a classical music label. For jazz it created Impulse!. Led by Creed Taylor and Bob Thiele, Impulse! developed a reputation for innovative releases, including albums by John Coltrane from 1961 until his death in 1967. ABC created Bluesway for blues music. Tangerine was formed by Ray Charles to produce his albums and those he produced.

ABC Records bought Dunhill in the summer of 1967, forming ABC Dunhill Records. It also bought Don Robey's record labels, including Duke, Peacock, Back Beat, and Song Bird on May 23, 1973.

In 1974 ABC bought the Famous Music record labels from Gulf and Western, the parent company of Paramount. This acquisition gave ABC Dot, Blue Thumb, and a distribution deal with Sire, which released the first album from the Ramones.

ABC purchased all labels from Enoch Light in October 1959. It acquired Audition, Command, Colortone, and Waldorf Music Hall.

In 1979, ABC was acquired by MCA for $30 million. It operated briefly as a separate division. MCA was absorbed by the Universal Music Group, which currently distributes recordings for ABC's current sister company, Disney Music Group, worldwide except for Russia.

This is not the same ABC Records that operates in Australia, which is run by the Australian Broadcasting Corporation, although the Ampar label was distributed in Australia in the 1950s and 1960s, first by W&G Records (1955–60) and then by Festival. Nor is it the sub-label of Voiceprint.

== ABC-Paramount and ABC Records label variations ==
- 1955–1961: Black label, "ABC-PARAMOUNT" around top perimeter of label in yellow, red, and blue (repeating in that sequence) Venus medium font, with silver print for singles and the company's name in all white letters in Venus medium and silver print for albums and logo consisting of color spectrum Möbius strip and white jagged line (representing a sound wave). Bottom perimeter of label reads: "A PRODUCT OF AM-PAR RECORD CORP."
- 1961–1966: Same label as above, but disclaimer at bottom of label now reads: "A PRODUCT OF ABC-PARAMOUNT RECORDS, INC."
- 1966–1967: Label name now shortened to ABC Records. Black label with large white circle at top with "abc" in black letters and the "Möbius strip and sound wave" logo under the letters. This variant was used only for singles.
- 1967–1974: Black label with small white "abc" circle logo in color spectrum box at top (In conjunction with this label, a brief interim label was used from 1973 to 1974 consisting of three children's blocks spelling out ABC and one block with the "abc" logo in a white triangle at the top).
- 1974–1978: Yellow, orange, red and purple "sunburst" label with "abc Records" (black "abc" circle logo) between two black lines at top. (Note: The other ABC labels would also adopt this label, such as Dunhill, Dot, Blue Thumb with its logo next to the "abc" logo, and Backbeat and Impulse! with a green background rather than a yellow background, but the circles were the same.)
- 1978–1979: Same multi-colored label as above, but with 1/8 note featuring "abc" inside the bottom of the note. Late pressings show "Mfg. & Dist. by MCA Distributing Corp..." at the bottom perimeter, just before the ABC label was discontinued and its artists transferred to MCA.

== Artists associated with ABC Records and its labels ==
- Amazing Rhythm Aces
- Paul Anka
- Louis Armstrong
- The Atlantics
- Kevin Ayers
- Florence Ballard
- Count Basie
- Cliff Bennett and the Rebel Rousers (US/Canada)
- Joe Bennett and The Sparkletones
- Stephen Bishop
- Art Blakey
- Blood, Sweat & Tears
- Bobby Bland
- The Brass Ring
- Tom Bresh
- Charles Brown
- Roy Brown
- Jimmy Buffett
- Solomon Burke
- Shirley Collie
- Carl Carlton
- Betty Carter
- Johnny Carver (musician)
- Ray Charles
- Kvitka Cisyk
- Roy Clark
- Ornette Coleman
- John Coltrane
- John Conlee
- Billy "Crash" Craddock
- Jim Croce
- Crosby and Nash
- Crowfoot
- The Crusaders
- Danny & the Juniors
- Dalton and Dubarri
- James Darren
- Billy Davis Jr.
- The Del-Vikings
- The Dells
- Fats Domino
- Bo Donaldson and the Heywoods
- The Dramatics
- The Dubs
- Duke and the Drivers
- The Elegants
- Lu Elliott
- Mario Escudero
- Donna Fargo
- Narvel Felts
- Freddy Fender
- Ferrante & Teicher
- Mickie Finn's
- The Floaters
- Frank Fontaine
- Four Tops
- Ferrante & Teicher
- The 5th Dimension
- Lefty Frizzell
- Gabriel (band)
- Genesis (US/Canada)
- Eydie Gormé
- The Grass Roots
- George Hamilton IV
- Bobby Hammack
- Christian Harmonizers
- Richard Harris (US/Canada)
- Coleman Hawkins
- Isaac Hayes
- Roy Head
- Hello People
- Levon Helm
- Lawrence Hilton-Jacobs
- Eddie Holman
- John Lee Hooker
- Freddie Hubbard
- James Gang
- The Impressions
- Jackie and Roy
- Johnny Kidd and the Pirates (US/Canada)
- B.B. King
- Kracker
- Frankie Laine
- Julius La Rosa
- Denise LaSalle
- Yusef Lateef
- Steve Lawrence
- J B Loyd
- Eddie Lund
- Barbara Mandrell
- The Mamas and the Papas
- Barry Mann
- Charles Mann
- Shelly Manne
- Guy Marks
- The Marvelows
- Marilyn McCoo
- Brownie McGhee
- Barry McGuire
- Mighty Clouds of Joy
- Charles Mingus
- The O'Kaysions
- The Oak Ridge Boys
- Tommy Overstreet
- Pavlov's Dog
- Paxton Brothers
- Poco
- The Pointer Sisters
- The Poni-Tails
- Lloyd Price
- Rare Bird
- Jimmy Reed
- Emitt Rhodes
- Rhythm Heritage
- Cliff Richard (US/Canada)
- Sue Richards
- Howard Roberts (Impulse!)
- Tommy Roe
- Sonny Rollins
- Jeris Ross
- Royal Teens
- Rufus featuring Chaka Khan
- Jimmy Rushing
- John Wesley Ryles
- Sabicas
- Soupy Sales
- The San Lucas Band
- The Sapphires
- Bobby Scott
- Jack Scott
- Shirley Scott
- The Shadows (US/Canada)
- Archie Shepp
- Beverly Sills
- Smith (featuring Gayle McCormick)
- Soft Machine (Probe/ABC)
- Otis Spann
- Arnold Stang
- Dusty Springfield (US/Canada)
- Joe Stampley
- Red Steagall
- Silk
- Steely Dan
- Diane Steinberg
- Steppenwolf
- Stepson
- Sonny Terry
- B. J. Thomas
- Lucky Thompson
- Three Dog Night
- Buck Trent
- Joe Turner
- US Radio Band
- Eddie Vinson
- Bobby Vinton
- T-Bone Walker
- Joe Walsh
- Wha-Koo
- Josh White
- Chico Williams
- Lenny Williams
- Jimmy Witherspoon
- Bobby Wright
- O. V. Wright
- The Ziontones
- The Free Spirits

== Labels associated with ABC Records ==
- 20th Century Fox Records
- Addison Records
- Anchor Records
- Apt Records
- Back Beat Records
- Bigtop Records
- Blue Thumb Records
- Bluesway Records
- Boom Records
- Buluu Dunhill Records
- Chancellor Records
- Cimarron Records
- Colonial Records
- Command Records
- Dot Records
- Duke Records
- Dunhill Records
- Equinox Records
- Fargo Records
- Grand Award Records
- GTO Records
- Hickory Records
- Hot Buttered Soul Records
- Hunt Records
- Impulse! Records
- Jerden Records
- LHI Records
- Montel Records
- Myrrh Records
- Oliver Records
- Passport Records
- Peacock Records
- Probe Records
- Senate Records
- Shelter Records
- Sire Records
- Song Bird Records
- Tangerine Records
- Westminster Records
- Wren Records

== Management of ABC Records catalog today ==
The catalogs of ABC Records and its sub-labels are now controlled by Universal Music Group. UMG also distributes Disney Music Group, which is owned by ABC's current parent, The Walt Disney Company, with the following exceptions:

- The Paul Anka ABC-Paramount catalog is controlled by Anka himself. Distribution is done by Universal Music Enterprises and its Canadian counterpart UMusic.
- The Jim Croce catalog is controlled by the Croce estate and R2M Music, and is distributed by BMG Rights Management.
- The Ray Charles catalog is controlled by the Charles estate and is currently licensed to Concord Records. Concord's recordings are distributed by UMG.
- The Amazing Rhythm Aces catalog and the recordings that former 5th Dimension members Marilyn McCoo and Billy Davis Jr. made for ABC are controlled by Sony Music.
- Lawrence Welk acquired his Dot recordings (prior to ABC acquiring the label) which were reissued on his Ranwood Records label. Like Concord, Ranwood is also distributed by UMG.

The following labels manage different genres:

- Pop, rock, R&B: Geffen
- Jazz: Impulse!, Impulse!/Verve
- Country: Music Corporation of America
- Classical: Deutsche Grammophon
- Musical theater: Decca Broadway

These labels also produce releases from labels absorbed into ABC. For example, Music Corporation of America's catalog includes country releases on Dot Records. Deutsche Grammophon's catalog includes the Westminster Records catalog, as well as soundtracks released by Dot and Paramount Records.

== See also ==
- American Broadcasting Company
- 20th Century Fox Records
- Fox Music
- List of record labels
