= Rent party =

Type of social occasion

A rent party (sometimes called a house party) is a social occasion where tenants hire a musician or band to play and pass the hat to raise money to pay their rent, originating in Harlem during the 1920s. These parties were a means for Black tenants to eat, dance, and get away from everyday hardship and discrimination. The rent party played a major role in the development of jazz and blues music, alongside forms of swing dancing. The Oxford English Dictionary states that the term skiffle means "rent party", indicating the informality of the occasion. Thus, the word became associated with informal music. However, many notable jazz musicians are associated with rent parties, including pianists Speckled Red, Georgia Tom, Little Brother Montgomery, James P. Johnson, Willie "the Lion" Smith, and Fats Waller, although rent parties also featured bands as well. The OED also gives boogie as a term meaning 'rent party'.

Rent parties were often the location of so-called cutting contests, which involves jazz pianists taking turns at the piano, attempting to out-do each other.

== History ==
At the start of the Great Migration, and at the start of World War I, hundreds of thousands of African Americans began to move north into more urbanized areas of the United States. This was brought on with the need for a large labor force to help supply the war effort. Many at the time sought out new employment opportunities, as well as a means to escape Jim Crow laws in the south. Over the course of this time, around 1.5 million African Americans had moved up north and taken up factory positions or other urban jobs. Of that population, 200,000 had migrated to Harlem.

African Americans were still faced with social and economic discrimination within these urban areas, most notably when it came to rental payments. Black tenants were required to pay higher apartment rent than white tenants for small and cramped apartments, all while making less money as well. While a white family was more likely to make around $1,600 a year, a black family was more likely to make around $1,300. Alongside that, black tenants would often have to pay $20-$30 more in rent than white tenants.

Out of this grew the grounds for rent parties. Parties were hosted to raise enough money to make up the difference in rent due. While this was the original intent of these sorts of parties, eventually, they grew so popular that tenants started to throw them to supplement their salaries. Rent parties also evolved into an event of cultural importance, as rent parties were places for middle-class African Americans to go on their nights off and get away from the everyday struggle.

== Organization ==
Rent parties were predominantly advertised through "rent party tickets." These were printed as business cards and leaflets in order to be easily distributed. These tickets often had quirky rhymes or euphemisms, without explicitly identifying the event as a rent party. Some hosts would distribute these tickets to friends, neighbors, and acquaintances, while some hosts would pass tickets to random strangers, often hiding them amid various public spaces. Many were still careful when it came to handing out tickets, not wanting to attract the attention of police. Tickets never explicitly referred to events as rent parties, instead referring to them as a "Social Party" or a "Social Dance."

The cost of admission ranged around 25 cents. Parties were typically held on Saturdays, which was when many of the laborers were paid, or on Thursdays, which was when most domestic workers were off duty. Hosts often provided a variety of southern comfort food, such as fried chicken and collard greens. A big draw was the presence of bootleg alcohol, illegal at the time due to Prohibition. Live music and dancing was also a popular feature. Piano players and jazz bands were invited to provide live music for dancing. Dancing was a big part of the scene, often accompanied with contests and newly-invented dance moves.

Rent parties were very competitive, with up to twelve occurring on a single block within any given week. Rent parties were considered to be much rowdier than the average house party at the time, with drugs, gambling, and paid rooms for sex being widely available. Gangsters and racketeers would also host rent parties as fronts. Because of this, Black intellectuals of the time looked down upon these gatherings, worrying that they would reflect badly upon African Americans as a whole. Nevertheless, rent parties were also seen as means of building Black community and a creative way to tackle economic hardship.

== Legacy ==
Rent parties had a great impact on dance within the 1920s. Due to these parties being so crowded and highly energetic, the dance styles were often erratic and unpredictable. Dance styles, like the Lindy Hop, were invented through these parties. The Lindy Hop in particular was a jazz-based dance style that was heavily based on improvisation and swing dancing. This dance style would eventually gain popularity at the Savoy Ballroom, a very popular ballroom in Harlem that was the center of recreation and cultural life.

Rent parties were also the birthplace of new forms of music. Stride piano playing had emerged, which involved the left hand performing rhythmic chords, while the right had would play out blues melodies and riffs. The play style emerged due to the crowded nature of the parties, with the tenants wanting to hire as few musicians as possible. Because of this, lone piano players would have to entertain the entire party. The busy nature of the play style would compensate for the lack of an actual band. The style was referred to as the "Harlem Stride" and was popularized by several notable jazz musicians, such as James P Johnson, Fats Waller, and Willie "The Lion" Smith.

Renowned writer and poet Langston Hughes personally collected various rent party tickets and wrote and about his fond memories of rent parties. As a poet, he was fond of the little rhymes found on each of the party tickets and would store them in a personal collection. These can be found now amidst his other papers within the Yale Beinecke Rare Book & Manuscript Library.

The rent party experienced a revival during the COVID-19 pandemic. Due to the disappearance of paid gigs during the lockdown in the United States, pianist and Harlem resident Emmet Cohen started his version of the rent party as an online streaming concert on Monday nights to provide income for his trio with bassist Russell Hall, drummer Kyle Poole, as well as other musicians living or traveling through New York. The concert series is titled "Live From Emmet's Place." The in-person audience was limited to eight while the live online audience averaged 1000 attendees on Facebook and YouTube. One of the uploaded concert videos featuring singer Cyrille Aimee has accumulated over 4 million views.

== In popular culture ==
The band Steely Dan's 2009 tour of the United States was named the "Rent Party 09" tour.

Rent parties not featuring either jazz or specifically African American crowds are featured in the plots of movies set in New York during the 1980s and 1990s such as Party Girl (starring Parker Posey). The song "House Rent Party" (1955) by Babs Gonzales and The Waldos' 1994 album Rent Party are references to the practice.

== See also ==
- Harlem Renaissance
- Jazz Age
