= Cutting contest =

Stride piano music competition

A cutting contest is a type of musical battle that was traditionally held between various stride piano players from the 1920s to the 1940s, and to a lesser extent in improvisation contests on other jazz instruments during the swing era.

Up to the present time, the expression cutting in jazz is sometimes used, sometimes facetiously, to claim a new musician's technical superiority over another.

Cutting contests first had a more earnest meaning only among pianists, and later existed for their own sake. Originally, to "cut" another piano player meant to replace them at their job by outperforming them. This serious form of rivalry ended by the 1920s when pianists began acquiring more stable engagements, and basic ragtime and "fast shout" piano evolved into the more improvised stride style (a term that began to be used in the 1920s).

"Cutting" came to mean victory at a pre-arranged contest. These contests were held after hours in clubs, or in a Bronzeville, Chicago or Harlem, New York home "rent party", where an entrance fee raised prize money and helped residents pay their rent. In the contests, often one pianist began a tune; then others took turns "cutting in", introducing increasingly complex ideas, changing the key and/or tempo, and otherwise trying to outplay and out-style the previous musician(s).

The great stride pianist James P. Johnson and his "rival", Willie "The Lion" Smith, often participated in cutting contests. Yet they had so much respect for one another that their contests usually ended in draws, and they "cut in" only for humorous effect. Toward other pianists, however, Smith was often very sarcastic. He criticized them by asking, "Is your arm broken?", implying that they did not measure up to the heyday of stride piano, when pianists had competed by speed and intricate improvisation.

Cutting contests continued into the 1940s. Art Tatum usually won the contests he engaged in, beating out such notable pianists as Fats Waller, Teddy Wilson, Count Basie, Earl "Fatha" Hines, Albert Ammons, Harry Gibson, Pete Johnson, Marlowe Morris, Clarence Profit, and Claude Hopkins.

Cutting contests also took place between blues musicians.

An enduring form of the cutting contest is the "trading" tradition in jazz improvisation, where two or more musicians alternately play parts of solo choruses. Cutting contests are common events at Tap Dance festivals. Rap battles could also be considered a present-day form of the cutting contest.

== See also ==
- Guitar battle
- Jam session

== Sources ==
- Ken Burns (director) (2001). The Gift (part 2 of Jazz) (Documentary). PBS.
