= Trix =

Trix may refer to:

== Brands and products ==
- Trix (cereal), a breakfast cereal made by General Mills
  - Trix yogurt, branded Yoplait yogurt
- Trix (company), the German company that produced Trix construction and model train sets
- Trix (construction set), originally produced in Germany and later in the UK
- Kodak Tri-X, a popular brand of black-and-white photographic film from Kodak

== Science and technology ==
- Trix (dinosaur), a Tyrannosaurus rex specimen
- TRIX (operating system), start for the first attempt at the GNU kernel
- Trix (technical analysis), triple exponential, a technical analysis oscillator
- TriX (serialization format), Triples in XML, a serialization of Resource Description Framework models

== Arts and entertainment ==
- Trix & Flix, the two official mascots for UEFA Euro 2008
- Trix Gilmore, a recurring character on the TV series Gilmore Girls
- Trix MacMillan, a fictional character in the Eighth Doctor Adventures novels based upon the Doctor Who television series
- Trix Records, a blues record label
- Trix (group) (born 1960), pop group of blonde identical triplet women
- The Trix (Winx Club), a group of antagonists in the television series Winx Club

== People ==
- Helen Trix (1886–1951), American actress, dancer, singer, and song composer
- Trix Worrell (born 1959), St Lucia-born writer, composer, and director
- Trix Rechner, Swiss high jumper
- Trix Heberlein (born 1942), Swiss politician

== See also ==
- Trick (disambiguation)
