= Fannie Lou Hamer Freedom High School =

Public high school in the Bronx, New York

Location
- 1021 Jennings Street; Bronx, New York 10460; United States; 40.8313°N 73.8852°W

Information
- Type: Public high school
- Motto: Step Up. Stand Out. Move Forward.
- Established: 1994; 32 years ago
- School district: New York City Geographic District #12
- School number: X682
- CEEB code: 330515
- NCES School ID: 360009001327
- Principal: Jeffrey Palladino
- Faculty: 21.75 (on FTE basis)
- Grades: 9–12
- Enrollment: 443 (2023–24)
- Student to teacher ratio: 20.37
- Campus: Urban
- Website: www.flhfhs.org

Fannie Lou Hamer Freedom High School (FLHFHS) is a public high school located in the Bronx, New York City. Opened in 1994, the school is named after civil rights activist and voting rights advocate Fannie Lou Hamer, and its mission is deeply rooted in her legacy of social justice and community empowerment. The school is known for its distinctive educational model, which emphasizes critical thinking, civic engagement, and performance-based assessment.

== History ==
Fannie Lou Hamer Freedom High School was established in 1994, founded on the premise of creating a learning environment that would prepare students not only for college and careers but also to be active, socially conscious citizens committed to positive change. The decision to name the school after Fannie Lou Hamer (1917–1977), a prominent leader in the Civil Rights Movement, reflects its foundational commitment to fighting injustice and fostering a deep understanding of historical and contemporary social issues. Hamer, known for her tireless work in voter registration and her powerful speeches, provides a potent inspiration for the school's ethos.

In 2018, students from Fannie Lou Hamer Freedom High School successfully petitioned the New York City Council to rename a portion of West Farms Road in the Bronx to "Fannie Lou Hamer Street," further cementing her legacy in the local community and highlighting the school's commitment to civic action.

== Educational philosophy and curriculum ==
Fannie Lou Hamer Freedom High School operates with a progressive educational philosophy that contrasts with traditional high school models. Key aspects include:

- Social Justice Focus: The core mission is to teach students "to use their minds well and prepare them to live productive, socially useful, and personally satisfying lives," with a strong emphasis on understanding and addressing societal injustice.
- Performance-Based Assessment Tasks (PBATs): Rather than relying solely on standardized tests, students demonstrate their learning through comprehensive, in-depth projects and presentations, particularly in their junior and senior years. These "Graduation Portfolios" require students to produce original work in areas like literature, history, social issues, math, science, and art. This aligns with schools that are part of the New York Performance Standards Consortium.
- Interdisciplinary Learning: The curriculum often integrates subjects, particularly in the humanities, to foster holistic understanding.
- Community School Model: FLHFHS operates as a Children's Aid Community School, offering integrated support services to students and their families, including access to medical, dental, and mental health services, and programs addressing issues like adolescent pregnancy prevention and vision care.
- College and Career Readiness: The school provides college classes, internships, and digital courses, and works with a dedicated team of college and career counselors to guide students toward post-secondary goals. It participates in initiatives like the Career Readiness and Modern Youth Apprenticeship (CRMYA) pilot program, offering apprenticeships in tech, finance, and business.
- Technology Integration: The school leverages technology to enhance learning, offering asynchronous classrooms and has been recognized as an Apple Distinguished Schools Program for its innovative use of technology.

== Demographics and location ==
Fannie Lou Hamer Freedom High School is located at 1021 Jennings Street, Bronx, NY 10460. The school serves grades 9–12 within New York City Geographic District#12. The student body is diverse, with a significant percentage of economically disadvantaged students, reflecting the demographics of the South Bronx.

== Recognition and partnerships ==
Fannie Lou Hamer Freedom High School has received various forms of recognition for its innovative approach and success:

- Schools of Opportunity: In 2015, the National Education Policy Center named FLHFHS a "School of Opportunity," one of only 5 high schools nationwide to receive the Gold Recognition, for its commitment to supporting students and closing opportunity gaps.
- Apple Distinguished Program: Recognized by Apple for its innovative use of technology in education.
- Children's Aid Community School: A partnership with Children's Aid Society provides comprehensive support services.
- Consortium Member: As part of the New York Performance Standards Consortium, it is recognized for its alternative assessment model.
- Sloan STEM Teaching Awards: Teachers from the school have been recognized with Sloan Awards for Excellence in Teaching Science and Mathematics.

== Transportation ==
The school is near the New York City Subway's Whitlock Avenue station, served by the 6 train, and the Freeman Street station, served by the 2 and 5 trains. Several MTA Regional Bus Operations routes also serve the area, including the Bx19, Bx35, Bx4, Bx4A and Bx27.
