= Tricked =

Tricked may refer to:

- Tricked (British TV series), a British magic television series
  - Tricked (Canadian TV series), a Canadian adaptation of the British series
- Tricked (film), a 2013 American documentary film
- Tricked, a 2012 film created during the Entertainment Experience
- "Tricked", a song by Royce da 5'9" from the 2020 album The Allegory
- Tricked, a 2012 novel by Kevin Hearne in the series The Iron Druid Chronicles
- Tricked (graphic novel), a graphic novel by Alex Robinson
- "Tricked (That's the Way I Like It)", a song by God Lives Underwater
- "Tricked", an episode of Nickelodeon's The Loud House

== See also ==
- Trick (disambiguation)
