= Colah B. Tawkin =

American entrepreneur, gardener and podcaster

- Born: Ticole Smith
- Citizenship: USA
- Occupations: Podcaster, gardener, entrepreneur
- Known for: Black in the Garden podcast
- Website: https://blkinthegarden.com/about

Colah B. Tawkin, born Ticole Smith, is an American entrepreneur, gardener and podcaster, whose podcast Black in the Garden reached the Top Ten of Apple's Home & Garden Podcasts.

== Career ==
Tawkin is a former professional truck driver. She began her broadcasting career in 2019 after she noticed a gap in the market for a podcast at the crossover between horticulture and Black culture. Since its launch, Black in the Garden has reached the Top Ten of Apple's Home & Garden Podcasts and it was an Apple featured podcast in Black History Month in 2021. Tawkin's work aims to increase the representation of Black people within the world of horticulture by providing a platform to enable the voices of Black farmers and garden enthusiasts to be heard. She cites Toni Morrison and Fannie Lou Hamer as inspiration for the "black gardening experience" her work represents. New York City Food Policy Centre recommended Black in the Garden to audiences who want to explore "historical and contemporary impacts of race and culture on [the] food system".

== Personal life ==
Tawkin is originally from Jacksonville, Florida.
