= Tricky Business =

Tricky Business may refer to:

- Tricky Business (Australian TV series), an Australian television drama series
- Tricky Business (UK TV series), a British children's television comedy series
- Tricky Business (novel), a novel by Dave Barry
