= Tricky Dicky =

Tricky Dicky or Tricky Dick may refer to:

- US President Richard Nixon, as an unfriendly nickname with origins in the 1950 United States Senate election in California (also "Tricky Dick")
  - A song about Richard Nixon by Country Joe McDonald
  - Tricky Dick: The Rise and Fall and Rise of Richard M. Nixon, a biography by Roger Stone and Mike Colapietro
- "Tricky Dicky", a 1962 song by Jerry Leiber and Mike Stoller, recorded by Richie Barrett and The Searchers among others
- Tricky Dicky (Cor!!), a British comic strip by Cyril Gwyn Price, which appeared in the magazine Cor!! from 1970 to 1973
- Tricky Dicky (Topper), a British comic strip by John Dalles which appeared in the magazine The Topper and The Beano, from 1977 on
- Richard Hillman, in the Coronation Street TV series
- Richard Cole (EastEnders), in the EastEnders television series
- Man Called Invincible, a 1973 western comedy film also known as Tricky Dicky

== See also ==
- "Tricky Dick", the 3rd episode of the 3rd season of the sitcom 3rd Rock from the Sun
- Tricky Dicks, starring American slapstick comedy team The Three Stooges
- Tricky Nixon, a band from Manchester, England
