= Waldorf Music Hall Records =

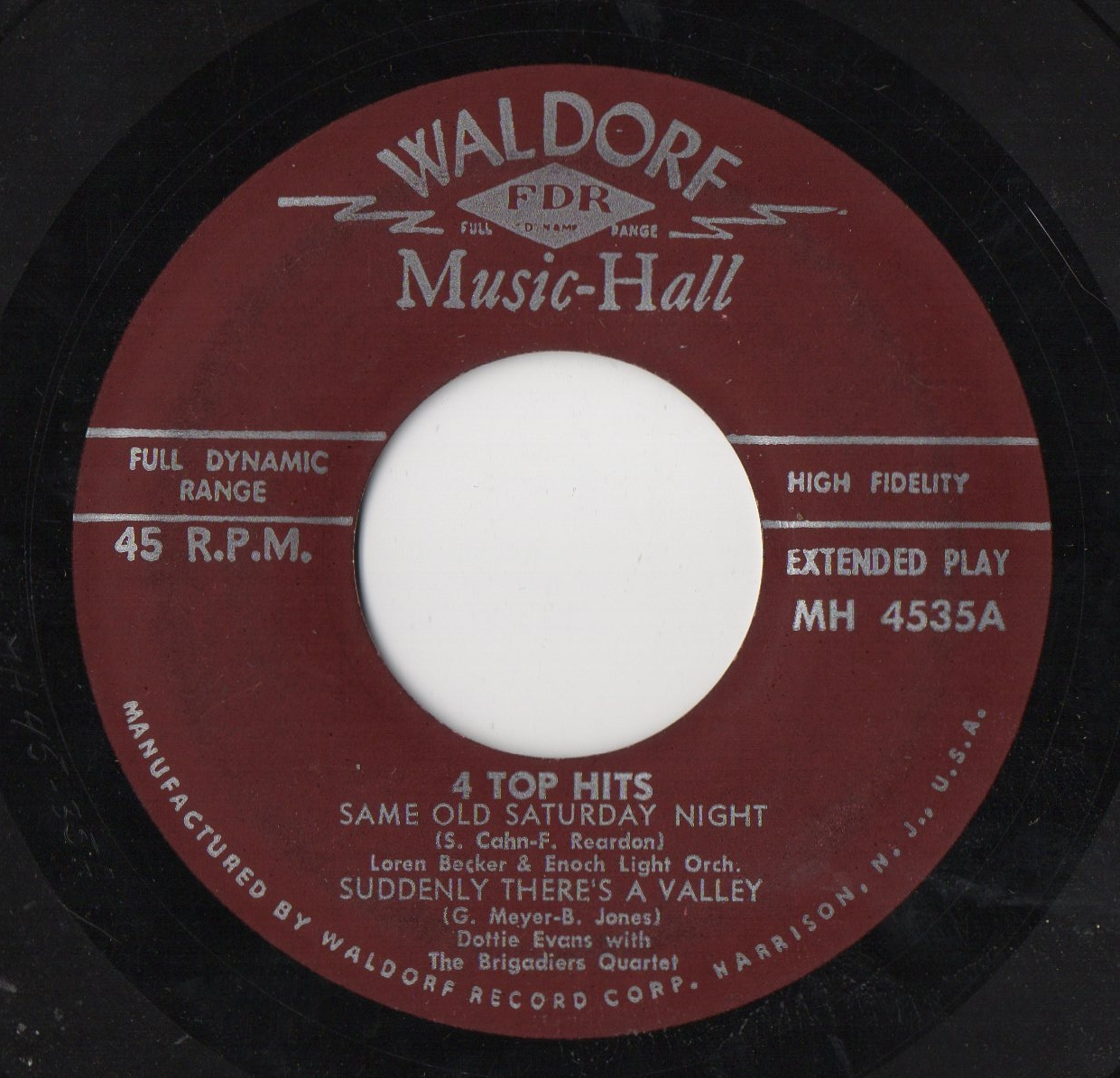
Waldorf Music Hall 4535, a 45rpm EP issued in 1955

Waldorf Music Hall Records was a budget record label exclusively sold in Woolworth stores from 1954 to 1959. Waldorf was headed by Enoch Light and based in Harrison, New Jersey. Light's business partners in this venture were Casper Pinsker and Dick Davemos. The business model for Waldorf Music Hall appears to have been inspired by the popularity of the Your Hit Parade television program. In the 1950s it was common to refer to Waldorf Music Hall, and other labels like it, as 'Hit Parader Records.'

== History ==
Although many sources give 1953 as the establishment date for Waldorf Music Hall, none of their releases appears to predate 1954. Light's promotional literature identifies Waldorf Music Hall as the first record label he began on his own, with Light's Project 3 label debuting in 1967. Therefore, the Waldorf label was "Project 1" whilst Grand Award Records and its later subsidiary Command Records became "Project 2". It was begun as a generic, "soundalike" label, with Light's stable of artists—Loren Becker, Artie Malvin, Lois Winter, Dottie Evans and others—reproducing the hits of the day. Some have regarded Waldorf Music Hall as the first such label, but it appears that Big 4 Hits, a label based out of Cincinnati and headed by Carl Burkhardt, was established in 1952 and is therefore earlier. Emblazoned with the diamond-shaped logo "FDR"—meaning "Full Dynamic Range," signifying high fidelity, but also invoking an acronym for a popular American president—Waldorf Music Hall was primarily a 10-inch LP label with 8 hits apiece; 48 releases in the 3300 series appeared between January 1954 and December 1957. Waldorf Music Hall also issued 45 rpm EPs of the same material; 78 rpm releases were issued on a plain label simply called "Waldorf" and on subsidiary labels 18 Top Hits and Rock N Roll. The 10" Lps sold for 99 cents, and the singles for 69 cents apiece.

As mainstream pop vocals in the hit market began to give way to rock n' roll hits, Hit Parader type versions of these began to sound considerably more quaint and old-fashioned compared to the originals. Fortunately, Waldorf Music Hall had begun to diversify its offerings already through a $1.49 12-inch album program that featured coherent offerings ranging from classical and opera to children's records, jazz, dance music and gospel. In 1955, Light had begun his higher profile Grand Award label and this drew some attention away from Waldorf Music Hall; the Hit Parader issues stopped at the end of 1957. However, at the same time Waldorf gained a budget subsidiary, Colortone Records. In 1959, Enoch Light sold all of his labels to AM-PAR and became part of their organization. Grand Award continued, but at this point Waldorf Music Hall became dormant, having served its short-lived purpose.

== Legacy ==
Many collectors view the Waldorf Music Hall records as "junk," and they are relatively common in second hand shops, though it took one collector more than thirty years to locate copies of all 48 albums in the 10" 3300 series. Nevertheless, some of the 12-inch albums—for example, those by the gospel group Deep River Boys and the traditional jazz band The Royal Playboys—remain desirable and are unique to Waldorf Music Hall. Moreover, the label also issued recordings by pianists Pauline Alpert and Dick Hyman (as "Knuckles O'Toole" and "Puddin' Head Smith"), bandleaders Will Bradley, Bobby Byrne and Peanuts Hucko and other significant artists under-utilized or not employed by the major labels. Waldorf Music Hall also released some novelty songs performed by TV comedian/actor Wally Cox. In keeping with Light's reputation as an audiophile, Waldorf Music Hall issues do on the whole sound better than average for Hit Parader records, and the performances are of professional caliber even if the idiom of rock 'n roll is not comfortably realized.

== Notable Releases ==
- Chimes at Christmas Time – Godrey Malcolm on the Organ with Fredrico on the Chimes – MHK 33-1230

== See also ==
- Grand Award Records
- List of record labels
