= Bolo'bolo =

1983 book by P.M.

bolo'bolo
- Author: P.M.
- Publication date: 1983

bolo'bolo is a 1983 book by P.M., a pseudonym for Hans Widmer, in which he outlines a plan for utopia.

== Synopsis ==
The opening of bolo'bolo describes and criticizes the current world, called the Planetary Work Machine, which the work describes as based on domination and resulting in the despoiling of the natural world. The author describes the Machine as decentrally orchestrated by corporations and government (and their representatives) who each independently increase their control over others, quashing resistance and the viability of alternative systems. He advocates the undermining of the system via subversion and construction ("substruction"). The book then presents a plan and a future history in which humanity transitions into the bolo system.

The remainder of the work describes the theoretical future social order and defines terms. A "bolo" is an intentional community formed of about 500 "ibus", or individual egos. The intentional community is described through its lifestyle ("nima"), hospitality ("sila"), and agrarian self-sufficiency ("kodu"), among other traits. Multiple intentional communities together form a socioeconomic network known as "bolo'bolo". The communities trade with gifts, barter, and, possibly, markets.

bolo'bolo's approach is anti-work and anti-state, and was written to be practiced.

== History ==
bolo'bolo was first published in 1983 in Switzerland. The book received multiple translations and reprints. It developed a cult following among European anarchists.
