= Charles McLaurin =

American civil rights organizer

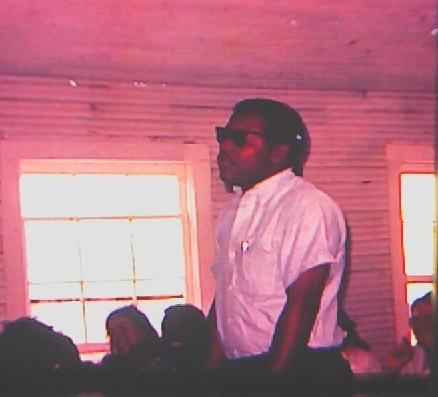

Charles McLaurin (born in 1941) is an American civil rights organizer. He moved to Sunflower County, Mississippi, in 1962 as part of the Student Nonviolent Coordinating Committee, to help alleviate injustices and expose the activities of James Eastland against African Americans. He helped register African Americans to vote and was part of the Freedom Summer movement. His efforts met with retribution and violence. He worked with Fannie Lou Hamer. He was jailed.

He wrote notes on organizing. He later lived in Indianola.

The PBS show American Experience includes a segment where he revisits towns in rural Mississippi he worked in organizing voters. He was interviewed in 2015.
