= A Place Called Mississippi =

A Place Called Mississippi: Collected Narratives is a 1997 non-fiction book edited by Marion Barnwell and published by the University Press of Mississippi. It is a collection of text documents about the State of Mississippi.

There are six sections: "Forebears," "Terrains and Travelers," "Conflict," "Social Fabric," "Body and Soul," and "Lives and Legends." The first section, second, and third sections are historical, travel, and historical texts. The next two sections have cultural texts, and the final one have texts about figures in Mississippi literature.

Works include Works Progress Administration research done in the 1930s and previously unpublished works.

== Reception ==
William R. Glass of the Mississippi University for Women praised the book.
