= Hat trick (disambiguation) =

A hat-trick (commonly known as a hat trick), in various sports, means achieving three goals, three wickets in three deliveries, etc. in a single match.

Hat trick, hat-trick or hattrick may refer to:

- Hat-trick (cricket), three or more consecutive wickets taken in three or more consecutive deliveries by an individual bowler in a single match.
- "Hat Trick" (Once Upon a Time), an episode of ABC's 2011 fantasy drama Once Upon a Time
- Hattrick (video game), online football management game
- Hat-trick (magic trick), a classic magic trick in which an object is produced from an apparently empty stovepipe hat
- Hattrick (film), a 2007 Bollywood film
- "Hat Trick" (The Mighty B! episode)
- Hat Trick (America album), 1973
- Hat Trick (Jackie McLean album), 1996
- Hat Trick Productions, British comedy television production company
- Hat Trick (video game), 1984 arcade game based on the sport of ice hockey
- Hat Trick Hero, arcade game, a variant of Football Champ
- Hat manipulation, a form of juggling using a brimmed hat
