= Stride (music) =

Style of jazz piano music

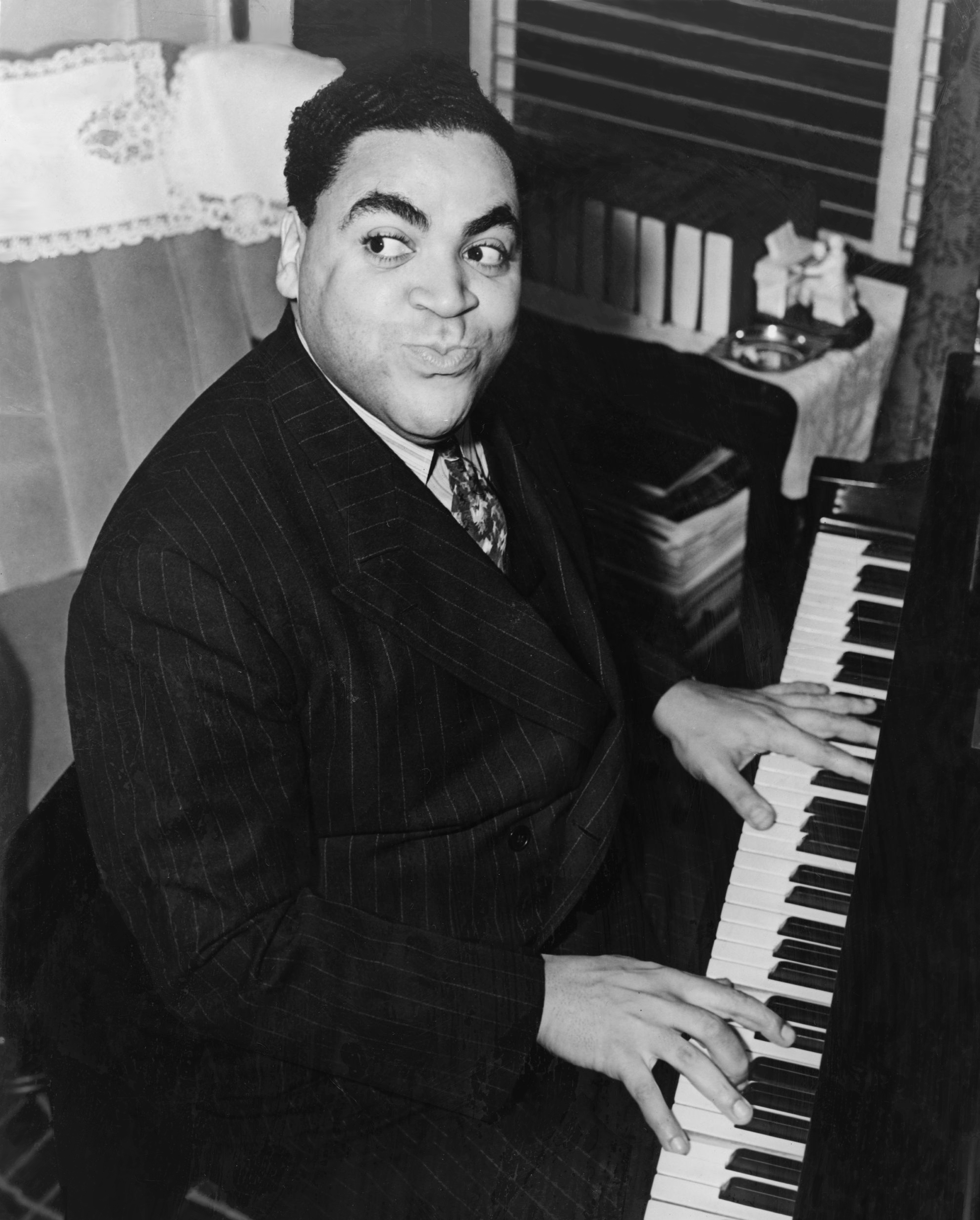
- Thomas "Fats" Waller (1904–1943), a student of James P. Johnson, was an important contributor to the stride piano style.
- Stylistic origins: Jazz; Ragtime
- Cultural origins: 1920s
- Derivative forms: Kansas City jazz

Stride jazz piano, often shortened to stride, is a jazz piano style that arose from ragtime players. Prominent stride pianists include James P. Johnson, Willie "the Lion" Smith, Fats Waller, Luckey Roberts, and Mary Lou Williams.

== Technique ==
Stride employed left hand techniques from ragtime, wider use of the piano's range, and quick tempos. Compositions were written but were also intended to be improvised.

The term "stride" comes from the idea of the pianist's left hand leaping, or "striding", across the piano. The left hand characteristically plays a four-beat pulse with a single bass note (or an octave, major seventh, minor seventh or major tenth interval) on the first and third beats, and a chord on the second and fourth beats. Occasionally this pattern is reversed by placing the chord on the downbeat and bass notes on the upbeat. Compared to the ragtime style popularized by Scott Joplin, stride players' left hands travel greater distances on the keyboard.

Stride piano is highly rhythmic because of the alternating bass note and chord action of the left hand while the right hand plays syncopated melody lines with harmonic and riff embellishments and fill patterns. Proper playing of stride jazz involves a subtle rhythmic tension between the left hand which is close to the established tempo, and the right hand, which is often slightly anticipatory.

Unlike ragtime pianists, stride pianists were not concerned with ragtime form and played pop songs of the day in the stride style. Ragtime was composed, but many stride pianists improvised. Some stride players didn't read music. Stride used tension and release and dynamics. Stride can be played at all tempos, slow or fast depending on the underlying composition and treatment the pianist is performing. On occasion a stride jazz pianist might have the left hand shift into double time.

Some pianists have transcribed display pieces note for note from early recordings. However, this practice only illustrates a small part of stride jazz musical adventures.

James P. Johnson (1894–1955), known as the "Father of Stride", created this style of jazz piano along with fellow pianists Willie "The Lion" Smith (1893–1973), Thomas "Fats" Waller (1904–1943) and Luckey Roberts (1887–1968). One of Johnson's contributions was to recast the "straight" feeling of ragtime with a more modern, swinging beat, sophisticated harmonies and dynamics. He discovered and employed the tenth or "broken tenth" interval. The pianist could not only substitute tenths for single bass notes but could also play broken (staggered) tenths up and down the keyboard.

Stride pianist Art Tatum (1909–1956) (a fan of Fats Waller and Lee Sims, who was himself a fan of the European "Impressionist" pianists such as Claude Debussy and Erik Satie, and hosted a radio program Tatum enjoyed) introduced more complex harmonies into his playing, and, like Fats Waller, would start songs with legato explorations of chordal intricacies before launching into swing. Tatum was given a posthumous Grammy Award in 1974.

Stride pianists used devices such as arpeggios, black note slide-offs, varying rhythmic accents, and tension and release.

Stride pianists engaged in marathon cutting contests to show off their skills.

== Practitioners ==
Other stride jazz pianists of the 20th century included Clarence Profit, Johnny Guarnieri, Mary Lou Williams, Cliff Jackson, Hank Duncan, Pat Flowers, Don Ewell, Joe Turner, Claude Hopkins, Ralph Sutton, Dick Wellstood, Dick Hyman, and Judy Carmichael. Others such as Duke Ellington, Thelonious Monk, and Jaki Byard developed the style for their own ends.

Other prominent stride jazz pianists are Butch Thompson, Mike Lipskin, Bernd Lhotzky, Louis Mazetier, Rossano Sportiello and Stephanie Trick, who perform internationally. Japanese pianist Hiromi Uehara's solo concerts often include stride-based pieces.

Mrs Mills used a stride technique for her many sing-along and party tunes.

== Works ==
- James Price Johnson – "Carolina Shout" (1918/1921), "Mule Walk," "Caprice Rag"
- Thomas "Fats" Waller – "Handful of Keys" (1929), "Vipers Drag" (1934), "Alligator Crawl" (1934)
- Willie "The Lion" Smith – "Finger Buster" (1931), "Echoes of Spring" (1939)

== See also ==
- Ragtime
- Jazz piano
- Novelty piano
- Swing music
