= Stephanie Trick =

- Born: 1987 (age 37–38); San Francisco, California, U.S.
- Genres: Jazz
- Occupation: Pianist
- Instrument(s): Piano, pipe organ
- Website: stephanietrick.com

Stephanie Trick (born 1987 in San Francisco, California, United States) is an American stride, ragtime and jazz pianist.

== Biography ==
Trick is the daughter of late I/T professional Allen Trick (1952-2012) and Filipina-American nurse Alina (Marcilla) Trick of St. Louis. Stephanie began playing piano at the age of five. Her interest outside classical music began at the age of ten, when her piano teacher introduced her to ragtime. She received her BA degree in music with honors from the University of Chicago in 2009. Trick demonstrates piano performance and composition styles of stride, ragtime and jazz piano from the 1900s to the 1940s. She emphasizes jazz standards, stride and boogie-woogie tunes with an accent on her specialty of Harlem stride. Trick and her husband, pianist Paolo Alderighi, reside in both St. Louis and Milan, Italy, his home town.

== Discography ==
- Piano Tricks (2005)
- Ragtime Tricks (2006)
- Hear That Rhythm! (2008)
- Stephanie Trick LIVE (2010)
- Something More (2011) – with Danny Coots (drums) and Jay Hungerford (bass)
- Two For One (2012) – with Paolo Alderighi (piano)
- Fourteen (2012) – with Lorraine Feather (vocal)
- Sentimental Journey (2014) – with Paolo Alderighi (piano)
- Double Trio Live (2015) – with Paolo Alderighi (piano) Marty Eggers (bass) Danny Coots (drums)
- Always (2016) – with Paolo Alderighi (piano) Roberto Piccolo (bass) Nicola Stranieri (drums)
- From Joplin to Jobim (2016) – Paolo Alderighi (piano) Engelbert Wrobel (reeds) Nicki Parrott (bass and vocals) Paolo Alderighi and Stephanie Trick, four-hands piano
- Broadway and More (2018) – with Paolo Alderighi (piano)
