= Freedom Farm Cooperative =

Civil rights movement food independence project

- Formation: 1967; 59 years ago
- Founder: Fannie Lou Hamer
- Dissolved: 1976; 50 years ago
- Location: Ruleville, Mississippi, United States
- Region served: Mississippi Delta
- Leader: Fannie Lou Hamer

Freedom Farm Cooperative was an agricultural cooperative in Sunflower County, Mississippi, founded by American civil rights activist Fannie Lou Hamer in 1967 as a rural economic development and political organizing project. The cooperative sought to uplift Black families through food provisions, such as vegetable gardens and pig-raising, and through community support, such as housing development and education. By providing food and financial services that the U.S. government systematically denied Black communities as a means of oppression, the cooperative allowed Black families to be self-sufficient. With reliable food and housing, the community was able to more freely participate in politics and protest. This cooperative is a foundation for modern food security and food justice movements.

== Background ==
During the Jim Crow era, the United States Department of Agriculture imposed a variety of policies that discriminated against Black farmers. The policies, which systematically rejected Black farmers from obtaining loans and subsidies available to White farmers, forced Black farm owners to lose their land and prevented them from buying new land. In the Mississippi Delta where Hamer founded her project, African American farmers lost approximately 12 million acres of land– six million of which was between 1950 and 1964, shortly before Hamer began the farm. This (among other federal government policies that disadvantaged Black people) forced many into sharecropping, low-wage agricultural work, or northern migration.

Under sharecropping and industrial agricultural work, Black farmers remained subject to the control of White landowners. They remained under continued oppression and were not free to exercise their political rights. Black agricultural workers were evicted and fired from their jobs for registering to vote.

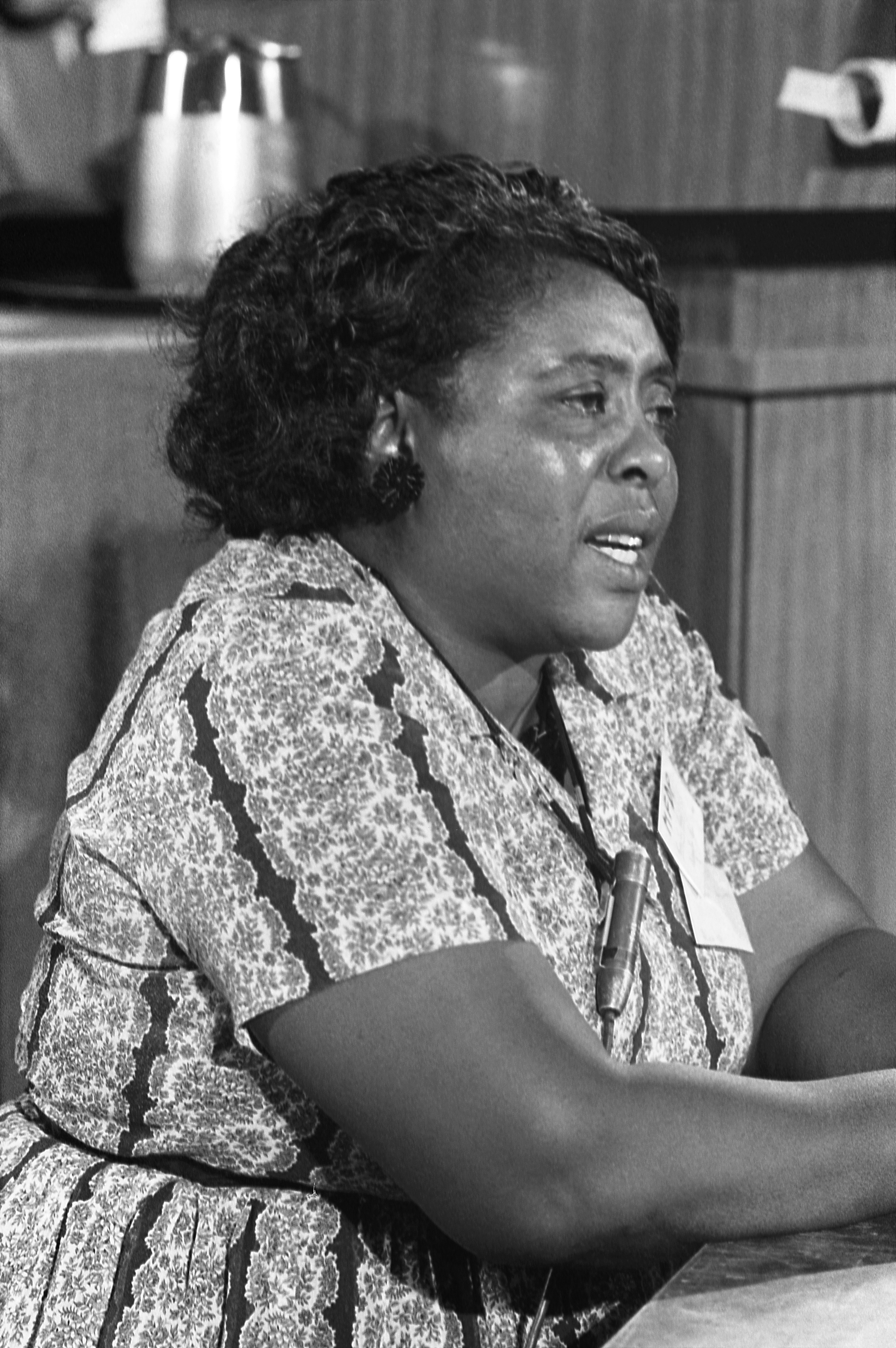
Freedom Farm Cooperative founder Fannie Lou Hamer in 1964

Hamer, born in 1917 in Mississippi, grew up in the midst of these conditions. The 20th and youngest child of sharecroppers, Hamer joined them in the plantation fields picking cotton at age six. She attended school until age 12 when she left to work full time. After she married in 1944, she and her husband worked on a Mississippi plantation. In 1962, Hamer joined the Student Non-Violent Coordinating Committee (SNCC) and participated in an action to register to vote. The couple moved to Ruleville, Mississippi (in rural Sunflower County) with almost nothing. Hamer continued to organize and made notable advances in the political arena; her speech at the 1964 Democratic National Convention helped lead to the Voting Rights Act of 1965.

"Where a couple of years ago white people were shooting at Negroes trying to register, now they say, 'go ahead and register—then you'll starve.'"

— Fannie Lou Hamer, 1968

Despite the national scale of civil right’s work, Hamer recognized the pressing need to address economic and food insecurity within her home community. Sunflower county, which was 67% Black, struggled with food insecurity and held some of the country’s highest rates of malnutrition, diabetes, and hypertension. The state of Mississippi intentionally created these conditions of starvation. While federal lawmakers witnessed the hunger and wanted to improve the situation, Mississippi congressman Jamie Whitten prevented action to assist the predominantly Black community.

Hamer saw the need for Black economic self-sufficiency as a means resistance that could foster political power. For Black people to achieve political freedom and rights, they had to rely on themselves alone.

== Founding and Expansion ==
As an economic response to widespread poverty and as a political project to empower Black families, Hamer began planning the Freedom Farm Cooperative. She founded the farm in 1967 on 40 acres of land. Hamer’s national connections to nonprofits and wealthy activists such as Measure for Measure and Harry Belafonte enabled the original investments. The immediate goals of the Freedom Food Cooperative (FFC) were threefold: to improve nutrition, affordable housing, and entrepreneurship opportunities for the Black community in the Delta.

The cooperative greatly expanded in 1972, acquiring 600 acres of land. They used the additional space to cultivate cash-crops, which included 300 acres of cotton, 200 acres of soybeans, 80 acres of wheat, and 10 acres of cucumber. They also raised cattle and catfish. The sale of cash-crops helped fund the food provisioning and community support programs as well as pay the mortgage on the land.

== Food Provisions ==
The farm, which fed over 1,500 families, consisted of a vegetable operation and pig bank.

Within two years of founding, the vegetable fields produced thousands of pounds of culturally appropriate vegetables such as collard greens, kale, rape, turnips, peas, corn, sweet potatoes, butter beans, okra, tomatoes, and string beans. Farming initiatives were particularly important to Black women, who have historically had a fundamental role in food production and whose bodies have been threatened in White agricultural spaces.

The pig bank, which started after a donation of 55 pigs (5 male and 50 female) from the National Council of Negro Women in 1967, yielded 2,000 pigs after three years. The pigs were held within fences and pens built by women and were loaned out to families who would harvest the pigs after producing piglets. The pig farm had international connections to Heifer International, which provided animal husbandry aid. Hamer felt owning a pig was a bulwark against starvation.

The farm was meant to be accessible to anyone in need of assistance. While the cooperative did have a monthly $1 membership due, it was not required and only 30 families could afford to pay. Instead, the cooperative allowed families to trade work hours for a bushel of the farm's produce. 10% of food provisions were dedicated to families within the community that were unable to participate on any level. While Sunflower County’s Black community was the primary focus of the cooperative, White families in need were included and excess produce was shipped to Black communities in Chicago.

The food provisioning programs addressed the high food security in Sunflower County and allowed Black families to be independent and self-reliant. Challenging existing power structures, FFC freed Black farmers from the oppression of sharecropping and the agriculture industry. With Black and local leadership that governed itself, made its own decisions, and grew its own food, survival was a means of resistance on its own. “Down where we are, food is used as a political weapon. But if you have a pig in your backyard, if you have some vegetables in your garden, you can feed yourself and your family, and nobody can push you around” said founder and activist Hamer. The aid from the farm cooperative and pig bank meant that Black farmers no longer had to risk starvation to vote.

== Community Support ==
The Freedom Farm Cooperative offered various forms of community support such as subsidized housing, education, employment opportunities, and general aid.

95% of Black people in Sunflower County lived in homes officially considered “dilapidated and deteriorating.” In response to the drastic need for safe and reliable housing, FFC created the Delta Housing Development Corporation. The project built 92 homes with electricity, running water, and indoor plumbing, which were utilities many homes in the Delta did not have before. As of 2020, some of these homes are still standing in Ruleville. The cooperative also used profits from cash-crops to help people buy new homes. Providing secure housing was also a means of obtaining political freedom. White property owners evicted their Black tenants when they registered to vote. In 1969, white owners evicted more than 100 African American sharecropping families from their shacks or tents on the plantation. Thus, independent housing allowed Black families to be politically active without immediate consequence.

The cooperative provided education to both children and adults. The state of Mississippi invested little in Black schools. FCC had a Head Start preschool program and also sponsored 25 students to go to college and vocational schools. Job and skill training in construction, food preservation, and sewing were also provided (White).

Direct employment opportunities within the cooperative included secretary, bookkeeper, farm manager, and farm laborer positions. The farm also hired summer youth workers. A sewing cooperative produced and sold garments. On site childcare was provided to employees.

The FCC offered general aid to members of the community in need of assistance. The cooperative provided clothing, food, and home and school supplies to families that needed. The “Out Right” grant gave financial assistance to families to help buy food stamps and medicine. The cooperative also provided temporary housing to families after disaster and emergencies. It also provided loans to new Black businesses in the county.

Importantly, the cooperative also provided civil rights classes and voter education. It also assisted with voter mobilization and activist support. The cooperative was therefore a site of both indirect and direct assistance. Indirectly, it enabled Black people to be free from starvation and oppression and able to be politically active. Directly, it actively supported voter registration and protest efforts.

== Closing and legacy ==
A combination of factors led to the eventual closing of Freedom Farm Cooperative in 1976. A series of floods, droughts, and tornadoes in 1972 and 1973 hindered cash-crop production, so the cooperative was not able to simultaneously fund social programs and pay off its taxes. Unlike White owned farms, FCC did not receive any financial support or subsidies from the State government. Instead tensions with local governments restricted the cooperative’s success. Organizational disagreements with donors as well as a general economic downturn caused funders to pull out. Hamer was also an instrumental figure in running the cooperative and obtaining national funding and support, yet her declining health and limited travel meant that the cooperative lacked a recognized leadership. The FFC closed in 1976 and Hamer died of breast cancer the following year, at age 59.

While the Freedom Farm Cooperative lasted fewer than ten years, its legacy lives on today. Food scholar Monica White refers to the project as an example of “collective agency and community resilience.” The Black community came together to defend their rights to healthy food, affordable housing, clean water, quality education, healthcare, and employment. Food cultivation and land stewardship is the entry point to explore racial justice economic empowerment, and community resilience. This endeavor serves as the foundation for modern Black community farming projects in both rural and urban areas. The Freedom Farmer’s market in Oakland, California, the Detroit Black Community Food Security Network (D-Town), and St. Louis’ Rustic Roots Sanctuary are key examples of modern Black food justice initiatives. “Give us food and it will be gone tomorrow. Give us land and the tools to work it and we will feed ourselves forever” said Hamer.
