= Fannie Lou Hamer =

American civil rights activist (1917–1977)

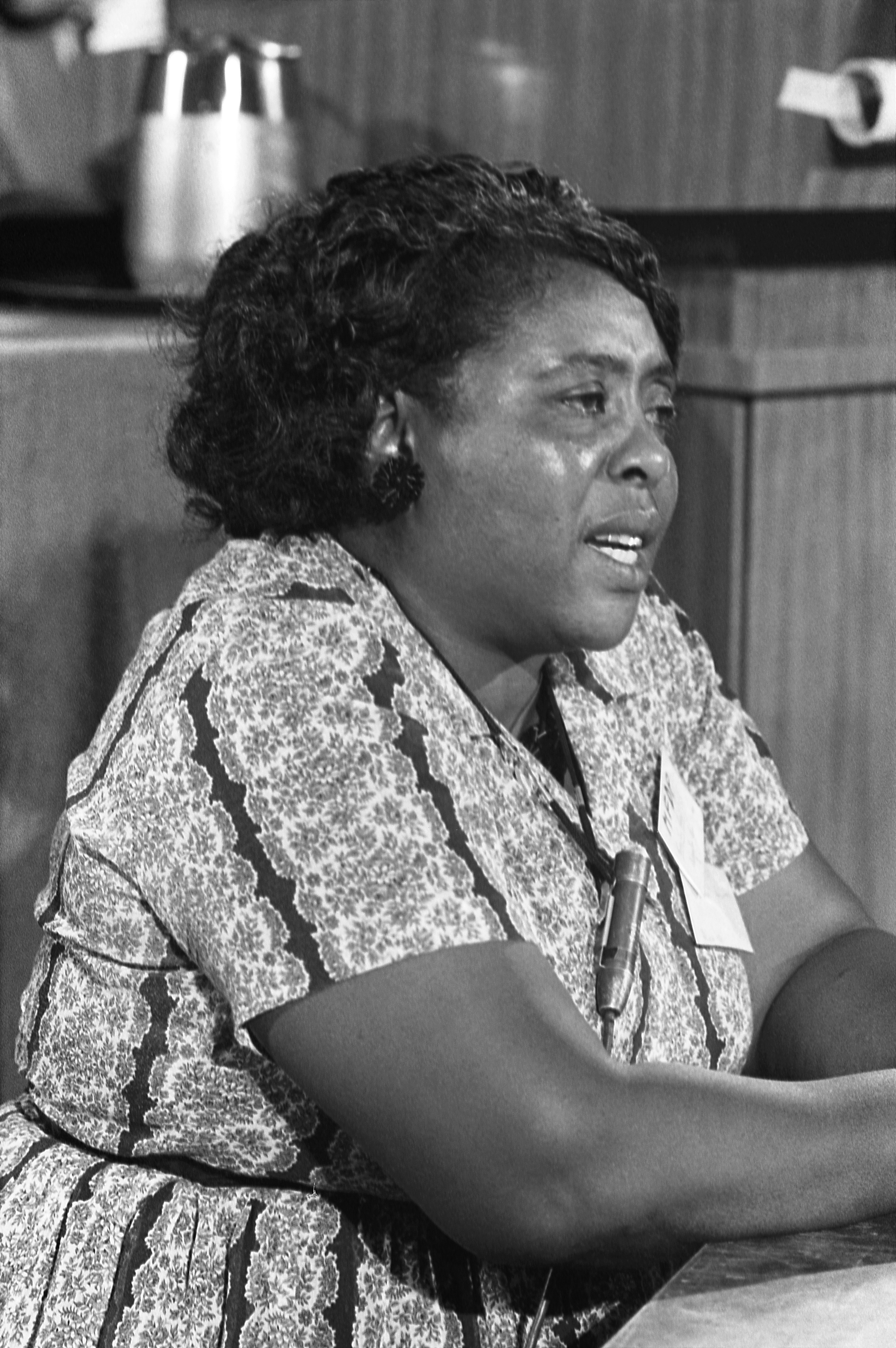
- Hamer in 1964
- Born: Fannie Lou Townsend; October 6, 1917; Montgomery County, Mississippi, U.S.
- Died: March 14, 1977 (aged 59); Mound Bayou, Mississippi, U.S.
- Burial place: Ruleville, Mississippi, U.S.
- Organization(s): National Women's Political Caucus; Student Nonviolent Coordinating Committee; National Council of Negro Women
- Known for: Civil rights leader
- Title: Vice chairwoman of Freedom Democratic Party; Co-founder of National Women's Political Caucus
- Political party: Freedom Democratic Party
- Movement: Civil rights movement Women's rights
- Spouse: Perry "Pap" Hamer
- Children: 4
- Awards: Inductee of the National Women's Hall of Fame

Fannie Lou Hamer (/ˈheɪmər/; née Townsend; October 6, 1917 – March 14, 1977) was an American voting and women's rights activist, community organizer, and leader of the civil rights movement. She was the vice-chair of the Freedom Democratic Party, which she represented at the 1964 Democratic National Convention. Hamer also organized Mississippi's Freedom Summer along with the Student Nonviolent Coordinating Committee (SNCC). She was a co-founder of the National Women's Political Caucus, an organization created to recruit, train, and support women of all races who sought election to government offices.

Hamer began her civil rights activism in 1962, continuing it until her health declined nine years later. She was known for her use of spiritual hymns and biblical quotes, and for her resilience in leading the civil rights movement for black women in Mississippi. She was threatened, harassed, shot at, and assaulted by racists, including members of the police, while she was trying to register to vote. She later helped and encouraged thousands of Black people in Mississippi to become registered voters, and assisted hundreds of disenfranchised people in her area through her work in programs such as the Freedom Farm Cooperative. She ran for the U.S. House in 1964, losing to Jamie Whitten, and she ran for the Mississippi State Senate in 1971. In 1970, she led legal action against the government of Sunflower County, Mississippi, for continued illegal segregation.

Hamer died on March 14, 1977, aged 59, in Mound Bayou, Mississippi. Her memorial service was widely attended and U.S. Ambassador to the United Nations Andrew Young delivered the eulogy. She was inducted into the National Women's Hall of Fame in 1993. On January 4, 2025, President Joe Biden posthumously awarded Hamer the Presidential Medal of Freedom.

== Early life, family, and education ==
Hamer was born as Fannie Lou Townsend on October 6, 1917, in Montgomery County, Mississippi. She was the last of the 20 children of Lou Ella and James Lee Townsend.

In 1919, the Townsends moved to Ruleville, Mississippi, to work as sharecroppers on W. D. Marlow's plantation. From age six, Hamer picked cotton with her family. During the winters of 1924 through 1930, she attended the one-room school provided for the sharecroppers' children, open between picking seasons. Hamer loved reading and excelled in spelling bees and reciting poetry, but at age 12 she had to leave school to help support her aging parents. By age 13, she would pick 200–300 pounds (90 to 140 kg) of cotton daily while living with polio.

Hamer continued to develop her reading and interpretation skills in Bible study at her church; in later years Lawrence Guyot admired her ability to connect "the biblical exhortations for liberation and [the struggle for civil rights] any time that she wanted to and move in and out to any frames of reference". In 1944, after the plantation owner discovered her literacy, she was selected as its time and record keeper. The following year she married Perry "Pap" Hamer, a tractor driver on the Marlow plantation, and they remained there for the next 18 years.

We had a little money so we took care of her and raised her. She was sickly too when I got her; suffered from malnutrition. Then she got run over by a car and her leg was broken. So she's only in fourth grade now.

— Fannie Lou Hamer

Hamer and her husband wanted very much to start a family, but in 1961, a doctor subjected Hamer to a hysterectomy without her consent while she was undergoing surgery to remove a uterine tumor. Forced sterilization was a common method of population control in Mississippi that targeted poor, African-American women. Members of the Black community called the procedure a "Mississippi appendectomy". The Hamers later raised two girls they adopted, eventually adopting two more. One, Dorothy Jean, died at age 22 of internal hemorrhaging after she was denied admission to the local hospital because of her mother's activism.

Hamer became interested in the civil rights movement in the 1950s. She heard leaders of the local movement speak at annual Regional Council of Negro Leadership (RCNL) conferences, held in Mound Bayou, Mississippi. The attendees of the yearly conferences discussed black voting rights and other civil rights issues black communities in the area faced. She became a good friend of RCNL founder and head T. R. M. Howard.

== Civil rights activism ==
=== Registering to vote ===
On August 31, 1962, Hamer and 17 others attempted to vote but failed a literacy test, which meant that they could not vote. On December 4, just after she returned to her hometown, Hamer went to the courthouse in Indianola, where she took the test again, but she failed it again and she was turned away as a result. She told the registrar, "You'll see me every 30 days till I pass". On January 10, 1963, she took the test a third time. She was successful and was informed that she was now a registered voter in Mississippi. But when she attempted to vote that fall, she discovered her registration did not allow her to vote, as her county also required voters to have two poll tax receipts.

This requirement had emerged in some (mostly former Confederate) states after the right to vote was first given to men of all races by the 1870 ratification of the Fifteenth Amendment to the United States Constitution. These laws, along with the literacy tests and local government acts of coercion, were used against black people and Native Americans. Hamer later paid for and acquired the requisite poll tax receipts.

As an example of how black citizens were disenfranchised in Mississippi, Hamer said that she "had never heard, until 1962, that black people could register and vote."

Hamer began to become more involved in the activism of the Student Nonviolent Coordinating Committee after these incidents. She attended many Southern Christian Leadership Conferences (SCLC), where she sometimes taught classes, and various SNCC (pronounced "Snick") workshops. She traveled to gather signatures for petitions to attempt to be granted federal resources for impoverished black families across the South. In early 1963, she became a SNCC field secretary for voter registration and welfare programs. Many of these first attempts to register more black voters in Mississippi were met with the same problems Hamer had found in trying to register herself.

We been waitin' all our lives, and still gettin' killed, still gettin' hung, still gettin' beat to death. Now we're tired waitin'!

— Fannie Lou Hamer

=== White racist attacks ===
They kicked me off the plantation, they set me free. It's the best thing that could happen. Now I can work for my people.

— Fannie Lou Hamer

After she attempted to vote, Hamer was fired by her boss, but her husband was required to stay on the land until the end of the harvest. Hamer moved between homes over the next several days for protection. On September 10, 1962, while staying with friend Mary Tucker, Hamer was shot at 15 times in a drive-by shooting by racists. No one was injured in the event. The next day, Hamer and her family evacuated to nearby Tallahatchie County for three months, fearing retaliation by the Ku Klux Klan because she had attempted to vote.

I guess if I'd had any sense, I'd have been a little scared—but what was the point of being scared? The only thing they could do was kill me, and it kinda seemed like they'd been trying to do that a little bit at a time since I could remember.

— Fannie Lou Hamer

=== Police brutality ===
On June 9, 1963, Hamer was returning from a voter registration workshop by the Southern Christian Leadership Conference (SCLC) in Charleston, South Carolina. Traveling by bus with co-activists, they stopped for a break in Winona, Mississippi. Some of the activists went inside a local cafe, but were refused service by the waitress. Shortly after, a Mississippi State highway patrolman took out his billy club and intimidated the activists into leaving. One of the group decided to take down the officer's license plate number; while doing so the patrolman and a police chief entered the cafe and arrested the party. Hamer left the bus and inquired if they could continue their journey back to Greenwood, Mississippi. At that point the officers arrested her as well. Once in county jail, Hamer's colleagues were beaten by the police in the booking room (including 15-year-old June Johnson, for not addressing officers as "sir"). Hamer was then taken to a cell where two inmates were ordered, by the state trooper, to beat her using a baton. The police ensured she was held down during the almost fatal beating, and when she started to scream, beat her further. Hamer was also groped repeatedly by officers during the assault. When she attempted to resist, she stated an officer, "walked over, took my dress, pulled it up over my shoulders, leaving my body exposed to five men". Another in her group was beaten until she was unable to talk; a third, a teenager, was beaten, stomped on, and stripped. An activist from SNCC came the next day to see if he could help but was beaten until his eyes were swollen shut when he did not address an officer in the expected deferential manner.

Hamer was released on June 12, 1963. She needed more than a month to recuperate from the beatings and never fully recovered. Though the incident left profound physical and psychological effects, including a blood clot over her left eye and permanent damage on one of her kidneys, Hamer returned to Mississippi to organize voter registration drives, including the 1963 Freedom Ballot, a mock election, and the Freedom Summer initiative the following year. She was known to the volunteers of Freedom Summer as a motherly figure who believed that the civil rights effort should be multi-racial in nature. In addition to her "Northern" guests, Hamer played host to Tuskegee University student activists Sammy Younge Jr. and Wendell Paris. Younge and Paris grew to become profound activists and organizers under Hamer's tutelage. Younge was murdered in 1966 at a gas station in Macon County, Alabama, for using a "whites-only" restroom.

=== Freedom Democratic Party and Congressional run ===
External audio
- Audio of Hamer's testimony

In 1964, Hamer co-founded the Mississippi Freedom Democratic Party (MFDP), which sought to prevent the region's all-white Democratic Party from stifling African-American voices and to ensure there was a party for everyone that did not tolerate exploitation or discrimination (especially toward minorities). That summer, Hamer and other MFDP members traveled to the 1964 Democratic National Convention to stand as the official delegation from the state of Mississippi. Hamer's televised testimony to the convention's Credentials Committee was interrupted because of an impromptu speech and press conference that President Lyndon B. Johnson gave in the White House East Room with 30 governors present. But later that evening, most major news networks broadcast Hamer's testimony in its entirety, giving her and the MFDP much exposure:

All of this is on account we want to register, to become first-class citizens, and if the Freedom Democratic Party is not seated now, I question America. Is this America, the land of the free and the home of the brave, where we have to sleep with our telephones off the hooks because our lives are threatened daily because we want to live as decent human beings in America?

— Fannie Lou Hamer

To ease tensions at the convention, Senator and soon-to-be vice presidential nominee Hubert Humphrey offered a compromise on Johnson's behalf that would allocate two seats to the Freedom Democratic Party, with a promise of further reform at the 1968 convention. The MFDP rejected the offer, with Hamer saying, "We didn't come all the way up here to compromise for no more than we'd gotten here. We didn't come all this way for no two seats when all of us is tired." Afterward, the white members from the Mississippi delegation walked out. The MFDP was finally seated at the 1968 national convention when the Democratic Party adopted a clause demanding equality of representation from all of its state delegations. In 1972, Hamer was elected as a national party delegate.

One month after the 1964 convention, Hamer, James Forman, John Lewis, and other SNCC members traveled to the newly established African nation of Guinea. The three-week visit helped SNCC understand that its freedom struggle had international dimensions.

Also in 1964, Hamer embarked on a plan to run in the Democratic primary in her Mississippi U.S. House district. She was soundly defeated in the primary by the segregationist incumbent Jamie Whitten, but her action set in motion a consequential series of events. After the primary, she worked with Annie Devine and Victoria Gray to qualify for the November election ballot as third-party candidates of the MFDP. Again, the bid was unsuccessful, but in the aftermath of the general election, she and her team amassed 10,000 pages of witness testimony from more than 400 people about systematic disenfranchisement and intimidation of black voters (at the time, black citizens comprised 52.4% of her congressional district's population but less than 3% of its registered voters). She used the compiled evidence to file an election contest in the U.S. House, "challenging the seating of the Mississippi congressional delegation on the grounds that their elections were marred by voting discrimination and unconstitutional disenfranchisement of Black voters". The House committee dismissed her election challenge, but the testimony she collected was considered instrumental in passing the Voting Rights Act of 1965.

Rhetorical practices

Hamer traveled around the country, speaking at colleges, universities, and institutions. She was not rich, as confirmed by her clothing and vernacular. Moreover, Hamer was a short and stocky poor black woman with a deep Southern accent, which gave rise to ridicule in the minds of many in her audiences. Although she was an in-demand speaker, she was often patronized by both blacks and whites because she lacked formal education. For instance, NAACP leader Roy Wilkins said Hamer was "ignorant", and President Lyndon Johnson looked down on her. When she was being considered to speak as a delegate at the 1964 Democratic National Convention, Hubert Humphrey said: "The President will not allow that illiterate woman to speak from the floor of the convention."

In 1964, Hamer received an honorary degree from Tougaloo College, much to the dismay of a group of black intellectuals who thought she was undeserving of such an honor because she was "unlettered". On the other hand, Hamer had staunch supporters including Ella Baker, Bob Moses, Charles McLaurin, and Malcolm X who believed in her story and in her ability to communicate effectively. These supporters and others like them believed that despite Hamer's illiteracy, "People who have struggled to support themselves and large families, people who have survived in Georgia and Alabama and Mississippi, have learned some things we need to know." She was known to evoke strong emotions in her listeners, indicative of her "telling it like it is" oratorical style.

Hamer's style of speaking and connecting to audiences can be traced back to her upbringing and the black Baptist Church to which her family belonged, which many see as the source of her ability to sway audiences with words. Woven into her speeches was a deep level of confidence, biblical knowledge, and even comedy in a way that many did not think possible for someone without a formal education or access to "institutionalized power".

Hamer's mother instilled a sense of pride in being black when Hamer did not perceive that being black was a benefit during her childhood. Hamer had seen her mother walk around with a concealed pistol in an attempt to protect her children from white land owners who were known to beat sharecroppers' children. Hamer's father was a Baptist preacher who often entertained the family with jokes at the end of the day. Although Hamer made it only to sixth grade because she had to help the family work the fields, she excelled at reading, spelling, and poetry, and even won spelling bees. Her family encouraged her to recite her poetry to the family and their guests.

Hamer became a plantation timekeeper, a position that made her the point person who had to communicate with both the white land owners and the black sharecroppers, which helped her practice communicating to different kinds of people. After she got involved in the Civil Rights Movement in the early 1960s, Hamer's oratorical skills quickly became apparent. Leading activists were amazed at how she did not write her speeches but delivered them from memory.

The Reverend Edwin King said of Hamer, "She was an extraordinarily good cook of down-home foods...she liked to mix, to make whatever she was feeding people at midnight after they would come home from jail or somewhere else, to fix the perfect spices or recipe for her guest...after she became the orator, she began picking and choosing the spicy parts she'd put in her speeches. She was always doing the best she had with whatever she had. The food, or words, or voice or song—choosing among it what was needed to persuade or to comfort or to please."

At speaking engagements, Hamer made speeches and also sang, often with The Freedom Singers. Charles Neblitt, one of its members, said of Hamer, "We'd let her sing all the songs we did that she knew. She put her whole self into her singing, adding a power to the group...When somebody puts their inner self into a song, it moves people. Her singing showed the kind of dedication that she had—the struggle and the pain, the frustration and the hope... Her life would be in that song."

Hamer's "Southern black vernacular", indicative of the denial of blacks', particularly black Southerners', access to standard American English, captures the feelings and experiences of black Southerners. According to Davis W. Houck and Maegan Parker Brooks in The Speeches of Fannie Lou Hamer, "the designation 'black' acknowledges aspects of Hamer's racialized experience that influenced her speech. When describing Hamer's discourse, we find the term 'vernacular' more precise than either 'dialect' or 'language' because the etymology of 'vernacular'—taken from the Latin vernaculus and verna—evokes a sense of being both 'native to a region' and 'subservient to something else.' In this respect, 'vernacular' echoes the particularity indicated by the regional distinction, as it simultaneously represents the relationship of power and domination that Hamer challenged through her words."

One of Hamer's most famous speeches was at Williams Institutional Church in Harlem on December 20, 1964. She appeared along with Malcolm X. In her speech, "Sick and Tired of Being Sick and Tired", she chronicled the violence and injustices she experienced while trying to register to vote. While highlighting the various acts of brutality she witnessed in the South, she was careful to tie in the fact that blacks in the North and all over the country were suffering the same oppression. The audience was one-third white and gave Hamer a warm reception.

== Freedom Farm Cooperative and later activism ==
After 1964, Hamer continued to work on other projects, including grassroots-level Head Start programs and Martin Luther King Jr.'s Poor People's Campaign. With the assistance of Julius Lester and Mary Varela, she published her autobiography in 1967. She said she was "tired of all this beating" and "there's so much hate. Only God has kept the Negro sane".

Hamer fought for equality across all aspects of society. In her view, African Americans were not free if they were not afforded the same opportunities as whites, including those in the agricultural industry. Sharecropping was the most common form of post-slavery activity and the main source of income in the South. The New Deal era expanded and, as a result, many blacks were physically and economically displaced due to the various projects initiated around the country. Hamer believed that blacks should not be dependent on any group, so she wanted to give them a voice through an agricultural movement.

Hamer adamantly opposed abortion, calling it "legalized murder" in a 1969 speech at the White House and describing her position in terms of her Christian faith. In Until I Am Free, historian Keisha N. Blain writes, "Hamer viewed birth control and abortion as social justice issues. She feared that both were simply white supremacist tools to regulate the lives of impoverished Black people and even prevent the growth of the Black population."

James Eastland, a white senator, was one of the people who sought to keep African Americans disenfranchised and segregated from society. His influence on the overarching agricultural industry often suppressed minority groups to keep whites as the only power force in America. Hamer objected to this, and consequently, she pioneered the Freedom Farm Cooperative (FFC) in 1969, an attempt to redistribute economic power across groups and solidify an economic standing among African Americans. In the same vein as the Freedom Farm Collective, Hamer partnered with the National Council of Negro Women (NCNW) to establish an interracial and interregional support program called The Pig Project to provide protein for people who previously could not afford meat.

Hamer made it her mission to make land more accessible to African Americans. To do this, she founded a small "pig bank" with a starting donation from the NCNW of five boars and fifty gilts. Through the pig bank, a family could care for a pregnant female pig until it bore its offspring; subsequently, they would raise the piglets and use them for food and financial gain. Within five years, thousands of pigs were available for breeding. Hamer used the success of the bank to begin fundraising for the main farming corporation. She was able to convince the then-editor of the Harvard Crimson, James Fallows, to write an article that advocated for donations to the FFC.

Eventually, the FFC raised about $8,000, which enabled Hamer to purchase 40 acres of land previously owned by a black farmer who could no longer afford to occupy it. This became the Freedom Farm. The farm had three main objectives: to establish an agricultural organization that could supplement the nutritional needs of America's most disenfranchised people; to provide acceptable housing development; and create an entrepreneurial business incubator that would provide resources for new companies as well as retraining for those with limited education but manual labor experience.

Over time, the FFC offered various other services such as financial counseling, a scholarship fund and a housing agency. The FFC aided in securing 35 Federal Housing Administration (FHA) subsidized houses for struggling black families. Through her success, Hamer managed to acquire a new home, which served as inspiration for others to begin building themselves up. The FFC ultimately disbanded in 1975 due to lack of funding.

In 1971, Hamer co-founded the National Women's Political Caucus. She emphasized the power women could hold by acting as a voting majority in the U.S. regardless of race or ethnicity, saying: "A white mother is no different from a black mother. The only thing is they haven't had as many problems. But we cry the same tears." In her speech in Washington, D.C., at the founding of the National Women's Political Caucus, she said, "nobody's free until everybody's free."

== Later life and death ==
In 1961, while undergoing surgery to remove a tumor, Hamer was also forced to undergo a hysterectomy by a doctor without her consent; this medical procedure was frequently performed in accordance with Mississippi's compulsory sterilization plan to reduce the number of poor blacks in the state. Hamer is credited with coining the phrase "Mississippi appendectomy", a euphemism for involuntary or uninformed sterilization of black women, a common practice in the South during the 1960s. In January 1972, she was hospitalized for an extended period because she was suffering from nervous exhaustion, and after she suffered a nervous breakdown in January 1974, she was hospitalized again. By June 1974, Hamer was said to be in extremely poor health. Two years later, she was diagnosed with and underwent surgery for breast cancer.

Hamer died of complications from hypertension and breast cancer on March 14, 1977, aged 59, at Taborian Hospital, Mound Bayou, Mississippi. She was buried in her hometown of Ruleville, Mississippi. Her tombstone is engraved with one of her famous quotes, "I am sick and tired of being sick and tired."

Her primary memorial service, held at a church, was completely full. An overflow service was held at Ruleville Central High School (RCHS), with over 1,500 people in attendance. Andrew Young, United States Ambassador to the United Nations, spoke at the RCHS service, saying "None of us would be where we are now had she not been there then".

== Honors and awards ==
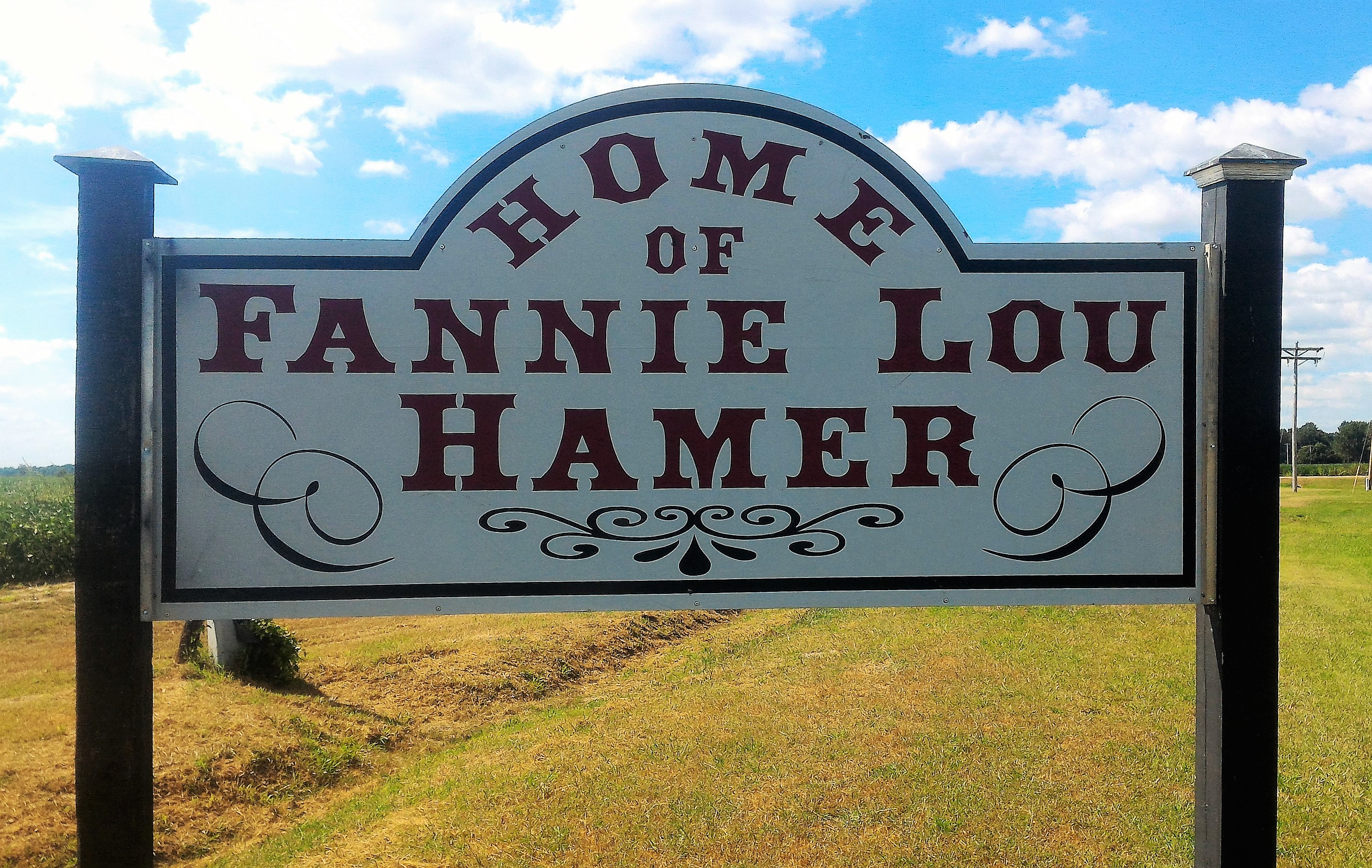
A sign honoring Fannie Lou Hamer for her work in Ruleville, Mississippi

Hamer received many awards both in her lifetime and posthumously. She received a Doctor of Law from Shaw University, and honorary degrees from Columbia College Chicago in 1970 and Howard University in 1972. She was inducted into the National Women's Hall of Fame in 1993.

Hamer also received the Paul Robeson Award from Alpha Kappa Alpha sorority, the Mary Church Terrell Award from Delta Sigma Theta sorority, the National Sojourner Truth Meritorious Service Award. She is an honorary member of Delta Sigma Theta. A remembrance for her life was given in the U.S. House of Representatives on the 100th anniversary of her birth, October 6, 2017, by Texas Congresswoman Sheila Jackson Lee.

On January 4, 2025, President Joe Biden awarded Hamer the Presidential Medal of Freedom posthumously.

== Tributes ==
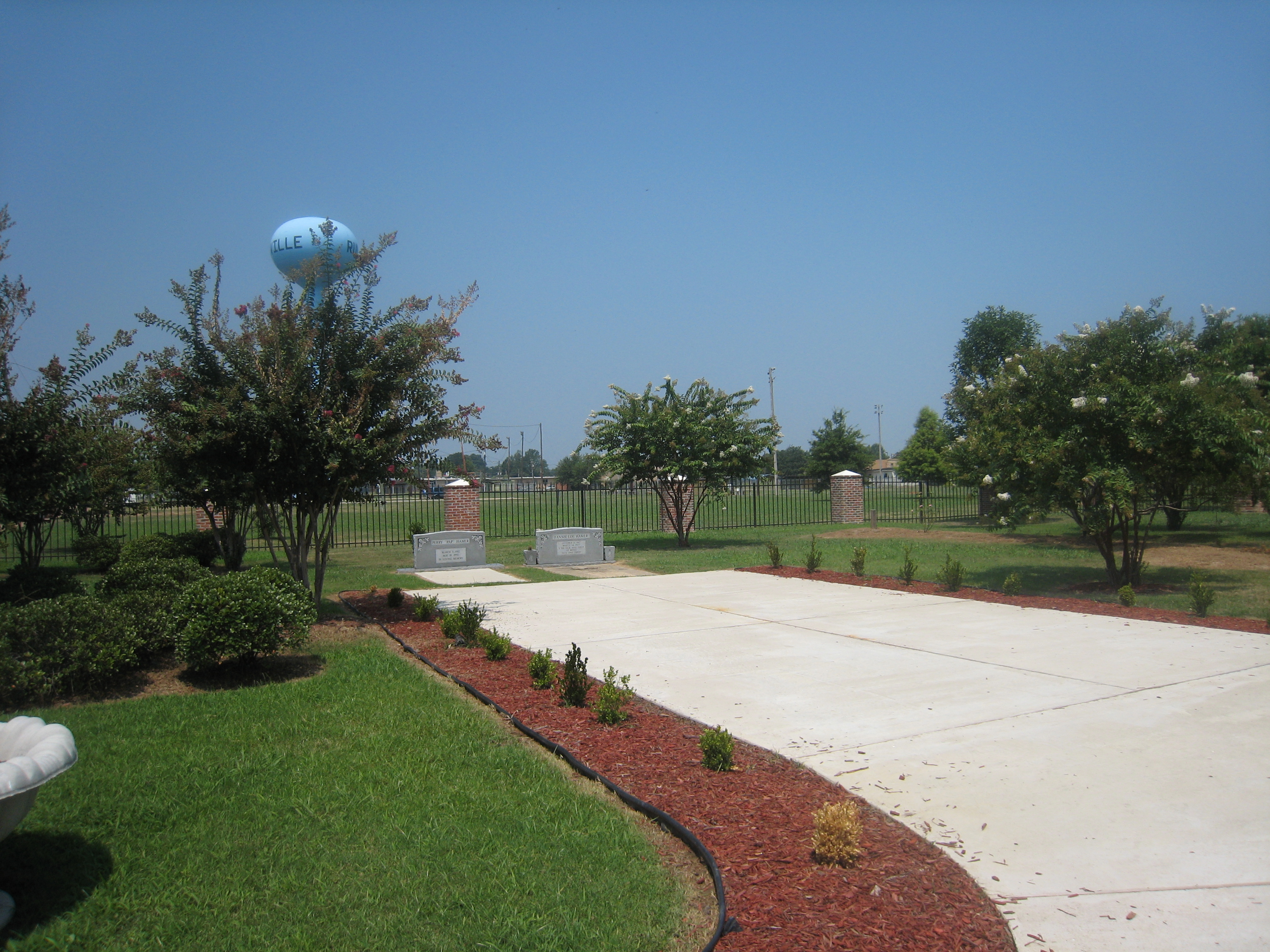
Fannie Lou Hamer Memorial Garden in Ruleville, Mississippi

When Martin Luther King Jr. received the Nobel Peace Prize in December 1964, he thanked "the great people", the civil rights workers "like the Fannie Lou Hamers", whom he called "a mighty army of love".

In 1970, Ruleville Central High School held a "Fannie Lou Hamer Day". Six years later, the City of Ruleville itself celebrated a "Fannie Lou Hamer Day". In 1977, Gil Scott-Heron and Brian Jackson wrote "95 South (All of the Places We've Been)", in Hamer's honor. Ta-Nehisi Coates described a 1994 live solo version of the song as "a haunting and somber ode".

In 1994, the Ruleville post office was named the Fannie Lou Hamer Post Office by an act of Congress. Additionally, The Fannie Lou Hamer National Institute on Citizenship and Democracy was founded in 1997 as a summer seminar and K–12 workshop program. In 2014 it was merged with the Council of Federated Organizations (COFO) Civil Rights Education Complex on the campus of Jackson State University, Jackson, to create the Fannie Lou Hamer Institute @ COFO: A Human and Civil Rights Interdisciplinary Education Center. The Hamer Institute @ COFO provides a research library and outreach programs. There is also a Fannie Lou Hamer Public Library in Jackson.

In 1994, Fannie Lou Hamer Freedom High School opened in the Bronx, New York, with a focus on humanities and social justice.

Ten Freedom Summers, a 2012 collection of suites by trumpeter and composer Wadada Leo Smith, who grew up in segregated Mississippi, includes "Fannie Lou Hamer and the Mississippi Freedom Democratic Party, 1964" as one of its 19 suites. Carole Boston Weatherford wrote a picture book about Hamer's life, Voice of Freedom: Fannie Lou Hamer, Spirit of the Civil Rights Movement; it won a Coretta Scott King Award. Hamer is also one of 28 civil rights icons depicted on the Buffalo, New York Freedom Wall. A quotation from her speech at the 1964 Democratic National Convention is carved on one of the eleven granite columns at the Civil Rights Garden in Atlantic City, where the convention was held.

In 2017, the Fannie Lou Hamer Black Resource Center opened at the University of California at Berkeley.

In 2018, the Mississippi Democratic Party's Jefferson-Jackson Dinner fundraiser was renamed the Hamer-Winter Dinner in honor of Hamer and former governor William Winter.

The third annual Women's March, held in Atlantic City, New Jersey, on January 19, 2019, was dedicated to Hamer's life and legacy. Several hundred people attended, representing many organizations. Several students from Fannie Lou Hamer Freedom High School attended despite a state of emergency declared by New Jersey Governor Phil Murphy due to an impending snowstorm.

Cheryl L. West wrote the play Fannie: The Music and Life of Fannie Lou Hamer, which premiered at the Actors Theatre of Louisville in 2022 as part of a co-production shared among Kenny Leon's True Colors Theatre Company, the August Wilson African American Cultural Center, City Theatre Company, and DEMASKUS Theater Collective.

The band Chairman Dances' song "Fannie Lou Hamer" describes Hamer's bus journey to Indianola, Mississippi, to register voters.

The gardener and podcaster Colah B. Tawkin cites Hamer as inspiration.

On August 20, 2024, Mississippi Governor Tate Reeves unveiled a historic marker for the Mississippi Freedom Trail at the Atlantic City site of the 1964 Democratic National Convention, honoring Hamer's work advocating for an integrated delegation at the convention.

== Works ==
- Fannie Lou Hamer, Julius Lester, and Mary Varela, Praise Our Bridges: An Autobiography, 1967.
- Fannie Lou Hamer, Smithsonian Folkways Recordings, Songs My Mother Taught Me (album), 2015.
- Maegan Parker Brooks; Davis W. Houck, eds. The Speeches of Fannie Lou Hamer: To Tell It Like It Is, 2010.

== See also ==
- African Americans in Mississippi
- Black women in American politics
- List of civil rights leaders
- Melerson Guy Dunham (1904–1985) – a friend of Fannie Lou Hamer, an educator, a civil rights and women's rights activist, and a historian

== General references ==
- Asch, Chris Myers (2008). The Senator and the Sharecropper: The Freedom Struggles of James O. Eastland and Fannie Lou Hamer. New York and Chapel Hill: The New Press and University of North Carolina Press. ISBN 978-1-59558-332-1.
- Badger, Anthony (2002). The Role of Ideas in the Civil Rights South. University Press of Mississippi. ISBN 978-1-60473-690-8.
- Beito, David T.; Beito, Linda Royster (2009). Black Maverick: T. R. M. Howard's Fight for Civil Rights and Economic Power. Urbana: University of Illinois Press. ISBN 978-0-252-03420-6.
- Blain, Keisha N. (2021). Until I Am Free: Fannie Lou Hamer's Enduring Message to America. Boston: Beacon Press. ISBN 978-0-80706-150-3.
- Burns, James MacGregor (April 10, 2012). "Chapter 8: Striding Toward Freedom". The Crosswinds of Freedom: 1932–1988. Open Road Media. ISBN 978-1-4532-4520-0.
- Chappell, David L. (2004). A Stone of Hope: Prophetic Religion and the Death of Jim Crow. University of North Carolina Press. ISBN 978-0-8078-2819-9.
- Davis, David A. (2013). "Southern Modernists and Modernity". In Monteith, Sharon (ed.). The Cambridge Companion to the Literature of the American South. University of Cambridge Press. ISBN 978-1-107-03678-9.
- Dittmer, John (1993). "Mississippi Movement". In Dittmer, John; Wright, George C.; Dulaney, W. Marvin (eds.). Essays on the American Civil Rights Movement. Texas A&M University Press. ISBN 978-0-89096-540-5.
- Donovan, Sandy (2003). Fannie Lou Hamer. Heinemann-Raintree Library. ISBN 978-1-107-61085-9.
- Hamer, Fannie Lou; Lester, Julius; Varela, Mary (1967). Praise Our Bridges: An Autobiography.
- Jones, Alethia; Eubanks, Virginia, eds. (2014). Ain't Gonna Let Nobody Turn Me Around: Forty Years of Movement Building with Barbara Smith. SUNY Press. ISBN 978-1-4384-5115-2.
- Lee, Chana Kai (2000). For Freedom's Sake: The Life of Fannie Lou Hamer. Urbana: University of Illinois Press. ISBN 978-0-252-06936-9.
- Marsh, Charles (1997). God's Long Summer: Stories of Faith and Civil Rights. Princeton: Princeton University Press. ISBN 978-0-691-02134-8.
- Mills, Kay (1997). Barnwell, Marion (ed.). A Place Called Mississippi: Collected Narratives. University Press of Mississippi. ISBN 978-1-61703-339-1.
- Nash, Jere; Taggart, Andy (2007). Mississippi Politics: The Struggle for Power, 1976–2008. University Press of Mississippi. ISBN 978-1-60473-357-0.
- Nelson, Jennifer (2003). Women of Color and the Reproductive Rights Movement. New York: NYU Press. ISBN 978-0-8147-5827-4.
- United States Commission on Civil Rights (1965). Voting in Mississippi (PDF). Washington, D.C.: United States government.
