= Tricky Hill =

Hill in Missouri, U.S.

Coordinates: 37°29′35″N 89°36′01″W

Tricky Hill is a summit in Cape Girardeau County, Missouri, in the United States. It has an elevation of 722 feet (220 m). The hill lies about two miles east-southeast of Pocahontas.
