= Grand Award Records =

American pop, jazz, and gospel music record label

- Founded: 1955
- Founder: Enoch Light

Grand Award Records was a pop, jazz, and gospel music record label founded by violinist and conductor Enoch Light in Harrison, New Jersey in 1955.

Light used the liner notes to describe how the records were made and to advertise their importance by using words such as "acclaimed" and "approved by". The cover design consisted of a fake frame of black and white around a well-drawn illustration in the middle. Early ones carried the slogan "Great Music – Great Art". Most of the classical records had reproductions of European masters for the illustrations. The pop records had illustrations by American illustrators of the day: Tracy Sugarman, Elmer Wexler, Arthur Shilstone, David Stone. Among the pop records issued by the label are the Roaring Twenties series done by the Charleston City All Stars band conducted by Light. Paul Whiteman recorded for the label.

In 1959 Light formed subsidiary Command Records, and that October, sold Grand Award and all of its subsidiary labels—Command, as well as Audition, Colortone, and Waldorf Music Hall—to ABC. After the sale, Light was vice president and chief of A&R for the labels. For Command releases, he hired audio engineer Robert C. Fine to make audiophile recordings for pop and jazz record buyers. He continued to use inflated prose to sell music. His name was prominent on many albums both as musician and producer. A few of the earliest covers were designed by Josef Albers. Other fairly famous artists contributed as well.

Grand Award LPs were phased out by 1961, but the label name was used by ABC at least until 1966.

ABC started the rock label ABC Command Probe, the first home of English progressive rock band Soft Machine. By 1970, the history of Waldorf Music Hall/Grand Award/Command essentially came to an end, although ABC used the Command label later in the 1970s for quadraphonic versions of albums released on its other labels. A few LP reissues (with the label now ABC/Grand Award) kept the music alive until about 1977.

== See also ==
- List of record labels
