= Joe Lipman =

American composer (1915–2007)

- Born: Joseph P. Lipman; April 23, 1915; Boston, Massachusetts, U.S.
- Died: January 21, 2007 (aged 91) Los Angeles, California, U.S.
- Genres: Traditional pop; jazz
- Occupations: Arranger; composer; bandleader; orchestrator
- Years active: 1936–1990
- Labels: MGM; Decca

Joseph P. Lipman (April 23, 1915 - January 21, 2007) was an American composer, arranger, conductor, pianist, and songwriter working in jazz and traditional pop. His musical career was over five decades long, having started at age 19 with the Benny Goodman orchestra in 1934 and writing for television, films, and Broadway in the 1980s. He composed and arranged for Bunny Berigan, Jimmy Dorsey, Sarah Vaughan, Charlie Parker and worked as staff arranger in television for Perry Como and Hollywood Palace.

== Career ==
Lipman was born Boston, Massachusetts on April 23, 1915. He started on the piano at the age of 7. After high school he attended college for two weeks but decided he to become a professional musician. At the age of 19, Lipman moved to New York City and joined the Benny Goodman orchestra on his Let's Dance radio show in 1934 and 1935 as a pianist. He encountered the arrangements and compositions that Goodman acquired from Fletcher Henderson. He arranged for Vincent Lopez, and worked as pianist and arranger for Bill Staffon in 1935 and Irving Aaronson in 1936, and became pianist and arranger with the Artie Shaw Orchestra in 1936. Lipman also played for and recorded with orchestra leader Nathaniel Shilkret in early 1937.

=== Joining big bands ===
In 1937 Lipman joined Bunny Berigan's band as pianist and remained in that position until Joe Bushkin took over in 1938. He re-orchestrated Berigan's second version of "I Can't Get Started" (1937). These Lipman arrangements included the 1938/39 concept album for RCA-Victor of Bix Beiderbecke's music featuring Berigan on re-arrangements of Beiderbecke's hits from the late 1920s (Bunny Plays Bix). On Saturday November 19, 1938, Berigan's group appeared on CBS's radio show, Saturday Night Swing Club with a contingent of nine musicians from his big band playing Lipman's new arrangement of Bix's composition In a Mist. From that same album he also arranged "Davenport Blues", "In the Dark", and "Candlelights". Though not a great commercial success, the album was to help Lipman move into a greater position as an arranger for more jazz and dance bands of the era. By the end of 1939 he was not writing arrangements for Berigan's band any longer. His arrangement on "Jazz Me Blues" would be the last he submitted.

Lipman's time with Berigan was successful but tumultuous and short lived; in August 1939 he replaced Freddie Slack to become the pianist and chief arranger for Jimmy Dorsey and stayed with the group almost three years. Unlike his tenure with the Berigan organization, Dorsey's band was already achieving success and had a sound of its own. Lipman wrote a string of titles for the Jimmy Dorsey band, including, "Turn Left", "Turn Right", "Murderistic", "Aurora", "Bar Babble" and "Major and Minor Stomp". He produced more popular dance material that was challenging for the band like that of arrangers Jimmy Mundy or Jerry Gray. He remained with the Jimmy Dorsey band until February 1942, when he was replaced by Johnny Guarnieri. He wrote hits for Glenn Miller such as "Blue Evening" and was helped by the success of bands led by Artie Shaw and Les Brown.

=== The Bebop era ===
After writing for Les Brown and others during the early 1940s, Lipman was at the forefront of writing and arranging for a new generation of jazz and popular musicians. Bebop was emerging in the work of Charlie Parker, Dizzy Gillespie, and Miles Davis.

In 1948 vocalist Sarah Vaughan contracted with Columbia Records, and Lipman was hired to arrange the song "Black Coffee" for her. His arrangement and rendering by Vaughan delivered a moody dirge about a woman's lonely fate. "Black Coffee" rose to No. 13 on the Billboard magazine pop chart in June 1949. He arranged a long list of hits that boosted Vaughan's popularity in the U.S. and U.K. Other songs he arranged for her included "Tonight I Shall Sleep With a Smile on My Face", You're Mine You", "You Taught Me to Love You Again", "Summertime", "While You're Gone", and "Bianca". In 1951 he arranged four songs for Dedicated to You, an album of duets between Vaughan and Billy Eckstine. He was contracted to write an arrangement "et (Jet, My Love)" for Nat King Cole in late 1950. In April 1951 he arranged and conducted the Capitol Records sessions for Mel Torme to record the two sides "Who Sends You Orchids" and "(I'm Sending You a) Bunch of Love".

Lipman's reputation as a conductor and arranger grew as he contracted with MGM. On June 18, 1954, MGM issued the album Manhattan Serenade by Joe Lipman and his Orchestra.

Lipman was the musical director on the recording of the Eileen Barton No. 1 hit "If I Knew You Were Comin' I'd've Baked a Cake" in 1949. Kay Thompson was paired with Lipman as her arranger and musical director in the recording studio. The 1955 album Kay Thompson Sings shows Lipman as a theatrical musical arranger. Popular singers and entertainers he wrote and arranged for through MGM during this time include Vic Damone, Betty Madigan, Kay Armen, Bill Tabbert, Jan August, Ginny Gibson, Ella Mae Morse, Fran Warren, and Bob Crosby.

Charlie Parker and his producer Norman Granz organized recording sessions in 1949 and 1950 that would culminate in the album Charlie Parker with Strings. While arranger Jimmy Carroll designed the first set of tracks, Lipman was contracted to arrange the second session (studio recordings of July 1950). These were Parker's most popular songs during his lifetime and were admitted to the Grammy Hall of Fame in 1988. With the success of first singles released from the Parker with Strings sessions, Granz and Parker agreed to record Parker in a big band session. The sessions were recorded from July 5, 1950 to March 25, 1952 and arranged by Lipman with Parker's approval, comprising Charlie Parker Big Band with two tracks added from earlier sessions. Singles appeared on the radio and record stores, but the album wasn't released until 1954.

=== Start in television ===
After successes with Vaughan, Cole, and Parker, Lipman was hired to write arrangements for Perry Como's first album, So Smooth, the beginning of a long, successful collaboration. Lipman worked on Como's staff from 1957 to 1962 for Perry Como's Kraft Music Hall. He also worked on The Pat Boone Chevy Showroom and with Connie Francis. After ten unsuccessful singles, Francis went into the studio with Lipman and his orchestra. The result was a version of the 1923 song "Who's Sorry Now", and it was released on New Year's Day during a telecast of Dick Clark's American Bandstand. It was a hit in the U.S. and U.K. Lipman was musical director on the singles "Carolina Moon", "I'm Sorry I Made You Cry", "You Were Only Fooling" and "Lock Up Your Heart".

=== Move to Los Angeles ===
By early 1963, Perry Como was uncertain if he would continue making regular television appearances and eventually would end his long running weekly series. His uncertainty caused Como's conductor Mitchell Ayres to accept an offer to become the conductor for a television show in Los Angeles. Ayres asked Lipman to become staff arranger, so Lipman moved in 1963 and worked on the television variety program The Hollywood Palace, which premiered in early 1964. The show had a six-year run from January 1964 through February 1970 (194 episodes). With different guest hosts every week, the show competed with The Ed Sullivan Show. The Hollywood Palace mimicked a vaudeville variety stage production being done live to tape at The Hollywood Palace Theater. Lipman was required to write arrangements every week for the telecast. In 1966 he received an Emmy Award nomination for his orchestration and arranging work.

His career includes orchestrations and ghost writing for Broadway shows, film scores, and television shows. He co-wrote the arrangements with Henri René for the 1964 release David Merrick Presents Hits from His Broadway Hits featuring John Gary and Ann-Margret. He worked on the orchestration staff for Lionel Newman and Jerry Herman to produce the 1969 Academy Award winning film score for the musical Hello Dolly! Also notably during this time, Lipman was the main orchestrator for Sammy Davis Jr.s Sammy Stops the World (1978) television special which was an adaptation of the hit musical Stop the World – I Want to Get Off. Lipman would earn a second Emmy nomination for "Outstanding Achievement in Music Direction" in 1980 for The Big Show.

== Awards and honors ==
=== Emmy Awards ===
Year	Nominee / work	Award	Result
1966	Hollywood Palace	Individual Achievements In Music - Arranging	Nominated
1980	The Big Show	Outstanding Achievement in Music Direction	Nominated

=== Academy Awards ===
Year	Award	Nominated work	Result
1969	Best Music, Score of a Musical Picture	Hello Dolly!	Won

== Discography ==
=== As leader ===
- Manhattan Serenade (MGM, 1954)

=== As sideman ===
With Bunny Berigan

- Bunny Plays Bix (RCA Victor) 1939
- Memorial Album (Bunny Berigan album) (RCA Victor) 1944

With Perry Como

- So Smooth (RCA Victor) 1955
- Saturday Night with Mr. C (RCA Victor) 1958
- When You Come to the End ff the Day (RCA Victor) 1958
- Season's Greetings from Perry Como (RCA Victor) 1959
- Como Swings (RCA Victor) 1959
- Sing to Me Mr. C (RCA Victor) 1961
- Perry At His Best (RCA Victor) 1963
- Hello, Young Lovers (RCA Camden) 1967

With Benny Goodman

- Hello Benny! (Capitol) 1964

With Gisèle MacKenzie

- Christmas with Gisèle (RCA) 1957

With David Merrick

- Hits from His Broadway Hits (RCA) 1964

With Charlie Parker

- Charlie Parker with Strings (Mercury) 1950
- Big Band (Clef) 1954

With Artie Shaw

- Artie Shaw with Strings (RCA) 1936

With Nathaniel Shilkret

- Thesaurus: A Treasure House of Recorded Programs (NBC) 1937

With Sarah Vaughan

- Sarah Vaughan in Hi-Fi (Columbia) 1950
- After Hours (Columbia,1955)

== See also ==
- List of jazz arrangers
