= Stomp progression =

In music and jazz harmony, the Stomp progression is an eight-bar chord progression named for its use in the "stomp" section of the composition "King Porter Stomp" (1923) by Jelly Roll Morton. The composition was later arranged by Fletcher Henderson, adding greater emphasis on the Trio section, containing a highly similar harmonic loop to that found in the Stomp section. It was one of the most popular tunes of the swing era, and the Stomp progression was often used.

Following the success of "King Porter Stomp", many other compositions were named after the tune, although many of these "stomps" did not necessarily employ the stomp progression.

== Harmonic progression ==
Magee (2004) describes a two-measure three-chord harmonic loop:

∥:	F	F♯^{o}^{7}	|	C^{7}	C^{7}	:∥

Putting the first C^{7} in second inversion produces a chromatically-ascending bass for the first three chords, so that loop becomes:

∥:	F	F♯^{o}^{7}	|	C^{7}/G	C^{7}	:∥

The progression is based on the last section of the piece, bars 57 to 64 in the original sheet music for piano or the Fake Book lead sheet, where the chords for the last ten bars of the piece are:

|	G♭	/	G^{o}	/	|	D♭^{7}/A♭	/	D♭^{7}	/	|	G♭	/	G^{o}	/	|	D♭^{7}/A♭	/	D♭^{7}	/	|
|	G♭^{7}	/	G^{o}	/	|	D♭/A♭	A^{o}	B♭m	D♭/A♭	|	G^{o}	/	G♭	/	|	D♭/F	B♭m	A^{o}	D♭/A♭	|
|	G^{o}	G♭^{6}	D♭/F	A♭	|	D♭^{9}	/	/	/	∥

In pieces where the progression is repeated, this becomes something like:

∥:	G♭^{7}	G^{o}^{7}	|	D♭^{7}/A♭	D♭^{7}	|	G♭^{7}	G^{o}^{7}	|	D♭^{7}/A♭	D♭^{7}	|
|	G♭^{7}	G^{o}^{7}	|	D♭^{7}/A♭	B♭^{7}	|	E♭^{7}	A♭^{7}	|	D♭^{7}		:∥

Another variation is:

∥:	G♭^{7}	G^{o}^{7}	|	D♭^{7}/A♭	D♭^{7}	|	G♭^{7}	G^{o}^{7}	|	D♭^{7}/A♭	D♭^{7}	|
|	G♭^{7}	G^{o}^{7}	|	D♭^{7}/A♭	B♭^{7}	|	E♭^{7}		|	A♭^{7}	D♭^{7}	:∥

which is, ignoring the temporary tonicization of G♭, and treating the key as that of the trio and stomp sections, D♭:

∥:	IV^{7}	♯iv^{o}^{7}	|	I^{7}(4; 3 )	I^{7}	|	IV^{7}	♯iv^{o}^{7}	|	I^{7}(4; 3 )	I^{7}	|
|	IV^{7}	♯iv^{o}^{7}	|	I^{7}(4; 3 )	VI^{7}	|	II^{7}		|	V^{7}	I^{7}	:∥

The last two measures contain the ragtime progression.

== Influence ==
Many bands and composers have used the Stomp chord progression to write new compositions, writing new head tunes or melodies, but using the chord changes to, as Morton phrased it, "make great tunes of themselves". Examples include Benny Carter's "Everybody Shuffle" (1934). A new tune that reuses the chord progression of an earlier composition but has a new melody is called a contrafact in jazz.

Other examples include:

- Larry Clinton and Bunny Berigan's "Study in Brown"
- Fats Waller's "Soothin' Syrup Stomp"
- Cab Calloway's "At the Clambake Carnival"
- Harry James's "Jump Town" and "Call the Porter"
- Benny Goodman's "Slipped Disc"
- Duke Ellington's "Bojangles (A Portrait of Bill Robinson)" (1940) chorus riff
- Sy Oliver's "Well, Git It!" for Tommy Dorsey's Orchestra (1942)
- Willie Bryant Orchestra's 1935 recording of George Gershwin's "Liza", eight-bar tag ending
