= Swing era =

Period of time (around 1935–1946)

There was a time, from 1933–1947, when teenagers and young adults danced to jazz-orientated bands. When jazz orchestras dominated pop charts and when influential clarinettists were household names. This was the swing era.

— Scott Yanow, Du Noyer, Paul (2003). The Illustrated Encyclopedia of Music (1st ed.). Fulham, London: Flame Tree Publishing. p. 128. ISBN 1-904041-96-5.

The swing era (also frequently referred to as the big band era) was the period (1933–1947) when big band swing music was the most popular music in the United States, especially for teenagers. Though this was its most popular period, the music had actually been around since the late 1920s and early 1930s, being played by black bands led by such artists as Duke Ellington, Jimmie Lunceford, Bennie Moten, Cab Calloway, Earl Hines, and Fletcher Henderson, and white bands from the 1920s led by the likes of Jean Goldkette, Russ Morgan and Isham Jones. An early milestone in the era was from "the King of Swing" Benny Goodman's performance at the Palomar Ballroom in Los Angeles on August 21, 1935, bringing the music to the rest of the country. The 1930s also became the era of other great soloists: the tenor saxophonists Coleman Hawkins, Ben Webster and Lester Young; the alto saxophonists Benny Carter and Johnny Hodges; the drummers Chick Webb, Gene Krupa, Jo Jones and Sid Catlett; the pianists Fats Waller and Teddy Wilson; the trumpeters Louis Armstrong, Roy Eldridge, Bunny Berigan, and Rex Stewart.

Developments in dance orchestras and jazz music culminated in swing music during the early 1930s. It brought to fruition ideas originated with Louis Armstrong, Earl Hines, Fletcher Henderson, Duke Ellington, and Jean Goldkette. The swing era also was precipitated by spicing up familiar commercial, popular material with a Harlem-oriented flavor and selling it via a white band for a white musical/commercial audience. In Benny Goodman's band, the most diversified styles flowed together: the ensemble style developed by Fletcher Henderson, who arranged for Goodman; the riff technique of Kansas City; and the precision and training of many white musicians. On the other hand, the easy melodic quality and clean intonation of Goodman's band made it possible to "sell" jazz to a mass audience.

The swing era brought to swing music Louis Armstrong, Billie Holiday, and by 1938 Ella Fitzgerald. Armstrong, who had heavily influenced jazz as its greatest soloist in the 1920s when working with both small bands and larger ones, now appeared only with big swing bands. Other musicians who rose during this time include Jimmy Dorsey, his brother Tommy Dorsey, Glenn Miller, Count Basie, Goodman's future rival Artie Shaw, and Woody Herman, who departed the Isham Jones band in 1936 to start his own band. Several factors led to the demise of the swing era: the 1942–1944 musicians' strike from August 1942 to November 1944 (the union that most jazz musicians belonged to told its members not to record until the record companies agreed to pay them each time their music was played on the radio), the earlier ban of ASCAP songs from radio stations, World War II which made it harder for bands to travel around as well as the "cabaret tax", which was as high as 30%, the rise of vocalist-centered pop and R&B as the dominant forms of popular music, and the rising interest in bebop among jazz musicians. Though some big bands survived through the late 1940s (Duke Ellington, Count Basie, Stan Kenton, Boyd Raeburn, Woody Herman), most of their competitors were forced to disband, bringing the swing era to a close. Big-band jazz would experience a resurgence starting in the mid-1950s, but it would never attain the same popularity as it had during the swing era.

== Musical elements ==
=== Beat ===
During the 1920s the older two-beat style of jazz was superseded by four-beat jazz, facilitated by replacement of the sousaphone with the string bass. Four beat rhythm was the foundation of the Chicago style jazz developed by Louis Armstrong and Earl Hines, and of the swing era rhythmic styles. The change in rhythm started first with solo pianists and small ensembles, then larger ensembles towards the end of the decade. Toward the end of the twenties the two-beat styles seemed all but exhausted. First in Chicago, then in Harlem and Kansas City, a new way of playing developed around 1928–29. Chicago musicians migrating to Harlem brought their rhythmic ideas with them. As is so often the case in jazz, there are confusing exceptions to this general outline. Jimmie Lunceford's big band at the height of the swing era employed a beat that was simultaneously 2/4 and 4/4. The Bob Crosby Orchestra and the Lionel Hampton Orchestra also featured two-beat rhythms long after four-beat rhythm became the standard.

=== Rhythm sections ===
In May 1935, the No. 1 record in the country was Jimmie Lunceford's "Rhythm Is Our Business". Released a few months before Benny Goodman triggered the national craze known as swing, the song offered a foretaste of the coming deluge. "Rhythm is our business/ Rhythm is what we sell," Lunceford's singer declared: "Rhythm is our business / Business sure is swell."[7] If rhythm defined the swing bands, its foundation lay in the rhythm section: piano, guitar, bass, and drums.

In big bands, rhythm sections fused into a unified rhythmic front: supplying the beat and marking the harmonies. Each of the leading bands presented a distinct, well-designed rhythmic attack that complemented its particular style. The rhythm sections of Ellington, Basie, and Lunceford, for example, sounded nothing alike. Just as the soloists were champing at the bit of big-band constraints, rhythm players were developing techniques and ideas that demanded more attention than they usually received. In the 1930s, rhythm instruments made dramatic advances toward the foreground of jazz. In the process, they helped set the stage for bebop. In 1939, Duke Ellington discovered virtuoso young bassist Jimmie Blanton and hired him into his Orchestra. Blanton revolutionized the bass as a featured instrument in the band, until he left the band in late 1941 due to terminal tuberculosis.

Towards the end of the 1930s the roles of the piano, bass, and drums in the rhythm section changed significantly under the influence of the Count Basie Orchestra Early swing drumming relied heavily on the bass and snare drums, with a secondary role for the high hat cymbal in timekeeping. Jo Jones inverted that relationship, making the high hat the primary timekeeper and using the bass and snare drums for accents and lead-ins. Basie introduced a rhythmically sparse style of piano playing emphasizing accents, lead-ins, and fills. Both of those changes increased the importance of the bass and guitar in timekeeping, ably held by Walter Page and Freddie Green. The lighter and sparser, yet more dynamic, sense of rhythm expressed by the Basie rhythm section lent greater freedom for the band's soloists and set a trend that would culminate in the rhythmic ideas of bebop.

=== Instruments ===
To help bands adjust to the new groove, major changes were made in the rhythm section. While the bass drum continued to play a rock-solid four beat pulse, the tuba, commonly used in large dance bands of the 1920s, was replaced by the string bass. During the early years of recording, the tuba was able to project a clear, huffing sound. But the string bass had been replacing the tuba over the rhythmic devices available with it and many players, including Wellman Braud with Duke Ellington's band, showed that the instrument had a special percussive flavor when the strings were given a pizzicato "slap" (plucked rather than bowed). Change came gradually in the late 1920s, once word had gotten around about how well the string bass worked; many tuba players realized that they'd better switch instruments or lose their jobs. With Walter Page's bass replacing the tuba in Bennie Moten's Kansas City Orchestra, the way was laid clear for the band to develop the kinetic style of swing it would show under the leadership of Count Basie.

The banjo, with its loud and raucous tone, was replaced with the guitar, which provided a more subtle and secure pulsation (chunk-chunk) in the foundation rhythm. As the saying went, the guitar was more felt than heard. Listeners felt the combined sound of bass, guitar, and drums as a sonic force that pushed through cavernous dance halls. "If you were on the first floor, and the dance hall was upstairs," Count Basie remembered, "that was what you would hear, that steady rump, rump, rump, rump in that medium tempo."

As often noted by commentators on jazz history, the swing era saw the saxophone supersede in many ways the trumpet as the dominant jazz solo instrument. Swing arrangements often emphasized the reed section to carry the melody, with trumpets providing accents and highlights. For this reason the types of solo improvisations would change dramatically during the thirties. Trumpeter Roy Eldridge deviated from the more common Armstrong-influenced styles towards a style of improvisation resembling that of reed players, and in turn would be an early influence on bebop trumpet pioneer Dizzy Gillespie. Coleman Hawkins and Benny Carter broke the barrier to early acceptance of the saxophone as a jazz instrument but it was the style of Frankie Trumbauer on C melody sax, showcased in the recordings he did with Bix Beiderbecke in 1927, that laid the groundwork for the style of saxophone playing that would make it a dominant influence on soloing styles. Lester Young, whose influence on saxophone playing became dominant towards the end of the 1930s, cited Trumbauer's linear, melodic approach to improvisation as his main inspiration for his own style.

The Fletcher Henderson Orchestra in 1927 consisted of two trumpets, two trombones, three reeds, piano, banjo, tuba, and drums. The Goodman band in 1935 had three trumpets, two trombones, the leader's clarinet, two alto saxes, two tenor saxes, piano, guitar, bass, and drums, fourteen pieces in all, compared to Henderson's eleven in the earlier days. The piano-guitar-bass-drums rhythm section had become standard and kept a steady and uncluttered beat that was very easy to follow. Goodman was quite skilled at setting the perfect dance tempo for each song while alternating wild "killer dillers" with slower ballads. In addition to Henderson and his younger brother Horace, Goodman employed top arrangers such as Fletcher Henderson, Jimmy Mundy, Deane Kincaide, Edgar Sampson, and Spud Murphy who put the melody first but included rhythmic figures in their charts and wrote arrangements that built to a logical climax. Mundy and Sampson had previously done arranging for Earl Hines and Chick Webb, respectively. In 1935, Goodman did not have many major soloists in his band. Unlike Duke Ellington, who went out of his way to hire unique individualists, and Count Basie, who came from a Kansas City tradition emphasizing soloists, Goodman was most concerned that his musicians read music perfectly, blended together naturally, and did not mind being subservient to the leader. It was the sound of the ensembles, the swinging rhythm section, and the leader's fluent clarinet that proved to be irresistible to his young and eager listeners.

=== Arranging ===
To fit the new groove, dance-band arranging became more inventive. To some extent, this was a belated influence of Louis Armstrong, whose rhythms continued to be absorbed by soloists and arrangers through the 1930s. Arrangers learned to write elaborate lines for an entire section, harmonized in block chords, called soli. They were conversant with chromatic (complex) harmony and knew how to make the most of their flexible orchestra.

Arrangements could also arise spontaneously out of oral practice. But even in New York, where bands prided themselves on their musical literacy, musicians could take improvised riffs and harmonize them on the spot. The result, known as a head arrangement, was a flexible, unwritten arrangement created by the entire band. One musician compared it to child's play—"a lot of kids playing in the mud, having a big time."

Both kinds of arrangements, written and unwritten, could be heard in the hundreds of recordings made in the 1930s by Fletcher Henderson. For flashy pieces, Henderson relied on experienced arrangers, from his brother Horace to Don Redman and Benny Carter. But his biggest hits emerged from the bandstand. One was "Sugar Foot Stomp", derived in the early 1920s from the King Oliver tune "Dippermouth Blues" and still in the repertory. By the 1930s, it had evolved into a thoroughly up-to-date dance tune, with a faster tempo to match the tastes of the dancers. Another hit was "King Porter Stomp", a ragtime piece by Jelly Roll Morton that became radically simplified, shedding its two-beat clumsiness and march/ragtime form as it went. Many of these pieces were ultimately written down by Henderson, who became his band's chief arranger. His genius for rhythmic swing and melodic simplicity was so effective that his music became the standard for numerous swing arrangers. Henderson was fond of short, memorable riffs—simple, bluesy phrases—in call and response: saxophones responding to trumpets, for example. In some passages, he distorted the melody into ingenious new rhythmic shapes, often in staccato (detached) bursts that opened up space for the rhythm section. Henderson was shrewd and efficient. He wrote only a few choice choruses, leaving the remainder of the arrangement open for solos accompanied by discreet, long-held chords or short riffs. As each piece headed toward its climax, the band erupted in an ecstatic wail.

== Songs from the swing era ==
The swing era produced many classic recordings. Some of those are:

- "Begin the Beguine", recorded by Artie Shaw; written by Cole Porter
- "Bei Mir Bist Du Schön" by the Andrews Sisters with Vic Schoen and his Orchestra
- "Body and Soul" by Coleman Hawkins; music by Johnny Green and lyrics by Frank Eyton, Edward Heyman and Robert Sour
- "Blue Skies" by Benny Goodman (Live at Carnegie Hall 1938)
- "Chattanooga Choo Choo" by Glenn Miller and His Orchestra; featured in the 1941 movie "Sun Valley Serenade"
- "Cherokee" by Charlie Barnet; music and lyrics by Ray Noble
- "Daddy From Georgia Way", recorded by Bob Chester and His Orchestra on Columbia Records; lyrics and music by Daisy Lawton, a pen name for Gloria Parker
- "For Dancers Only" by Jimmy Lunceford
- "Goody Goody" by Benny Goodman and His Orchestra (with vocalist Helen Ward)
- "Here Comes That Mood", recorded by Vincent Lopez; music and lyrics by Gloria Parker
- "I Can't Get Started" by Bunny Berigan
- "In Santiago by the Sea" by Gloria Parker and recorded by Vincent Lopez and His Orchestra
- "In the Mood" by Glenn Miller
- "It Don't Mean a Thing (If It Ain't Got That Swing)" by Duke Ellington
- "Jersey Bounce" by Benny Goodman
- "Jumpin' at the Woodside" by Count Basie
- "Leap Frog", the theme song of Les Brown (bandleader)
- "Minnie the Moocher" by Cab Calloway, Irving Mills, and Clarence Gaskill
- "Moonlight Serenade" by Glenn Miller
- "King Porter Stomp" by Fletcher Henderson
- "Nightmare" by Artie Shaw
- "Pennsylvania 6-5000" by Glenn Miller and His Orchestra
- "Sentimental Journey" co-written by Les Brown; vocal by Doris Day
- "Sing, Sing, Sing" by Benny Goodman
- "Song of India" by Tommy Dorsey
- "Stardust", which has been recorded by everyone from Armstrong, to Miller to Shaw; music and lyrics by Hoagy Carmichael
- "Stompin' at the Savoy" by Benny Goodman
- "Sugar Foot Stomp" by Fletcher Henderson and Benny Goodman
- "Tonight Be Tender To Me", written by Gloria Parker; recorded by Una Mae Carlisle
- "Tuxedo Junction" by Erskine Hawkins
- "Two O'Clock Jump" by Harry James
- "Where, I Wonder, Where?" and "What Would Happen To Me If Something Happened To You?" by Isham Jones, and Three X Sisters (vocalists)
