= Charlie Parker with Strings =

Compilation album by Charlie Parker
- Released: 1955
- Recorded: 1947–1952
- Genres: Jazz, third stream
- Length: 76:18
- Label: Clef
- Producer: Norman Granz

Charlie Parker chronology
Charlie Parker on Dial (1993)	Charlie Parker with Strings (1955)	Complete Charlie Parker on Dial (1996)

Professional ratings
Review scores
Source	Rating
AllMusic	5/5 stars
The Penguin Guide to Jazz Recordings	3/4 stars

Charlie Parker with Strings is a 1955 compilation album by American jazz saxophonist Charlie Parker released on Clef in 1955. The album compiles two 10" albums, Charlie Parker with Strings and Charlie Parker with Strings #2, originally released in 1950 on Mercury. It was reissued in 1956 by Columbia as April in Paris—credited to Charlie Parker with Strings—and by Verve in 1957 as April in Paris: The Genius of Charlie Parker #2. Verve also issued the complete master takes on January 24, 1995 as Charlie Parker with Strings: The Master Takes. The sessions place Parker in the context of a small classical string section and a jazz rhythm section, rather than his standard bebop quintet. They were Parker's most popular sellers during his lifetime, and were admitted to the Grammy Hall of Fame in 1988.

== Recording and release history ==
Under the auspices of producer Norman Granz, Parker fulfilled a long-held desire to record in a string setting. Plans were made to release the results of the sessions as a ten-inch LP. Sessions from November 30, 1949, yielded the first Charlie Parker With Strings album (Mercury MG-35010), consisting of six songs total, all of which were standards.

The success of the first album led to additional sessions on July 5, 1950, resulting in another long-playing album also entitled Charlie Parker With Strings (Mercury MGC-109), consisting of eight tracks, also all standards.

In 1995, Verve Records reissued these fourteen recordings for compact disc, including an additional ten tracks with Parker also accompanied by strings. Five date from a Carnegie Hall concert on September 17, 1950; four more from an additional studio session in January 1952, and the last from Granz's The Jazz Scene limited edition 78 rpms recorded in Carnegie Hall in December 1947 with Neal Hefti.

== Legacy ==
There is some controversy regarding the impetus for Parker to record standards, rather than his original compositions, in settings of this kind as a bid for greater commercial exposure. Certainly Mercury Records did not object to this idea, although biographical sources indicate Parker himself instigated the sessions. However, they were instrumental in creating a vogue among jazz musicians for recording in a similar fashion: see Clifford Brown with Strings in 1955, and Focus by Stan Getz in 1961, among others.

In 2014, in New York, saxophonist and bandleader Aaron Johnson produced an historically accurate recreation of the Charlie Parker with Strings albums.

== Original album track listings and personnel ==
=== Charlie Parker with Strings (Studio recordings of Nov. 30, 1949) ===
Released on 10" as Mercury MG-35010, reissued as MG C-501 and then MG C-101

- Charlie Parker – alto saxophone; Mitch Miller – oboe; Bronislav Gimpel, Max Hollander, Milton Lomask – violins; Frank Brieff – viola; Frank Miller – cello; Myor Rosen – harp; Stan Freeman – piano; Ray Brown – bass; Buddy Rich – drums; Jimmy Carroll – arranger and conductor
1. "Just Friends" (John Klenner, Sam M. Lewis) – 3:30
2. "Everything Happens to Me" (Tom Adair, Matt Dennis) – 3:15
3. "April in Paris" (Vernon Duke, E.Y. Harburg) – 3:12
4. "Summertime" (George Gershwin, Ira Gershwin, DuBose Heyward) – 2:46
5. "I Didn't Know What Time It Was" (Richard Rodgers, Lorenz Hart) – 3:12
6. "If I Should Lose You" (Ralph Rainger, Leo Robin) – 2:46

=== Charlie Parker with Strings (Studio recordings of July 1950) ===
Released on 10" as Mercury MGC-509, reissued as MGC-109.

- Charlie Parker – alto saxophone; Joseph Singer – french horn; Eddie Brown – oboe; Sam Caplan, Howard Kay, Harry Melnikoff, Sam Rand, Zelly Smirnoff – violins; Isadore Zir – viola; Maurice Brown – cello; Verley Mills – harp; Bernie Leighton – piano; Ray Brown – double bass; Buddy Rich – drums; Joe Lipman – arranger and conductor; unknown xylophone and tuba (track 8)
7. "Dancing in the Dark" (Arthur Schwartz, Howard Dietz) – 3:10
8. "Out of Nowhere" (Johnny Green, Edward Heyman) – 3:06
9. "Laura" (David Raksin, Johnny Mercer) – 2:57
10. "East of the Sun (and West of the Moon)" (Brooks Bowman) – 3:37
11. "They Can't Take That Away from Me" (G. Gershwin, I. Gershwin) – 3:17
12. "Easy to Love" (Cole Porter) – 3:29
13. "I'm in the Mood for Love" (Jimmy McHugh, Dorothy Fields) – 3:33
14. "I'll Remember April" (Gene de Paul, Pat Johnston, Don Raye) – 3:02

== 1995 reissue bonus track listing and personnel ==
Along with above released as Charlie Parker with Strings: The Master Takes, Verve 314 523 984–2

- Charlie Parker – alto saxophone; Tommy Mace – oboe; Sam Caplan, Ted Blume, Stan Karpenia – violins; Dave Uchitel – viola; Wallace McManus – harp; Al Haig – piano; Tommy Potter – double bass; Roy Haynes – drums; unknown cello
15. "What Is This Thing Called Love?" (Porter) – 2:55
16. "April in Paris" (Duke, Harburg) – 3:13
17. "Repetition" (Neal Hefti) – 2:48
18. "You'd Be So Easy to Love" (Porter) – 2:25
19. "Rocker" (Gerry Mulligan) – 3:00
- Charlie Parker – alto saxophone; Al Porcino, Chris Griffin, Bernie Privin – trumpets; Will Bradley, Bill Harris – trombones; Murray Williams, Toots Mondello – alto saxophones; Hank Ross – tenor saxophone; Stan Webb – baritone saxophone; Artie Drelinger – woodwinds; Sam Caplan, possibly Sylvan Shulman and Jack Zayde – violins; Verley Mills – harp; Lou Stein – piano; Bob Haggart – double bass; Don Lamond – drums; Joe Lipman – arranger and conductor; unknown woodwinds, violins, violas, and cello
20. "Temptation" (Nacio Herb Brown, Arthur Freed) – 3:31
21. "Lover" (Richard Rodgers, Lorenz Hart) – 3:06
22. "Autumn in New York" (Vernon Duke) – 3:29
23. "Stella by Starlight" (Victor Young, Ned Washington) – 2:56
- Charlie Parker – alto saxophone; Vinnie Jacobs – french horn; Porcino, Doug Mettome, Ray Wetzel – trumpets; Harris, Bart Varsalona – trombones; John LaPorta – clarinet; Williams, Sonny Salad – alto saxophones; Pete Mondello, Flip Phillips – tenor saxophones; Manny Albam – baritone saxophone; Sam Caplan, Zelly Smirnoff, Gene Orloff, Manny Fiddler, Sid Harris, Harry Katzmann – violins; Nat Nathanson, Fred Ruzilla – violas; Joe Benaventi – cello; Tony Aless – piano; Curly Russell – double bass; Shelly Manne – drums; Diego Iborra – percussion; Neal Hefti – arranger and conductor
24. "Repetition" (Hefti)– 2:57

== Other releases on vinyl ==
The history of the vinyl releases is a complex one. Other early vinyl releases besides those on Mercury were on Clef Records (Norman Granz's label, later absorbed into Verve) and Verve Records (also founded by Norman Granz, and the predecessor of Mercury). Besides the 10" 33 RPM records, there were releases on 10" 78 RPM (box set) and on 7" 45 RPM records.

For a reference to other releases of the songs on Mercury MG-35010 see https://web.archive.org/web/20160107195934/http://bird.parkerslegacy.com/CPws/ws491130.html and for Mercury MGC-109 see https://web.archive.org/web/20120825171441/http://bird.parkerslegacy.com/CPws/ws5008_09.html (missing a reference to MGC-109). MG-35010 was reissued as Mercury MGC-501 and Clef MGC-501; and Mercury MGC-109 as Mercury MGC-509 and Clef MGC-509. The cover of the MGC-109 and MGC-509 releases is not always the same, sometimes it is identical with MG-35010, and sometimes it shows birds.

Clef Records MGC 675 was an early (or the earliest) 12" release and had the same cover as MG-35010 but the following, differing content:

Just Friends
Everything Happens To Me
April In Paris
Summertime
I Didn't Know What Time It Was
If I Should Lose You

You Came Along From Out Of Nowhere
East Of The Sun
They Can't Take That Away From Me
Easy To Love
I'm In The Mood For Love
I'll Remember April

The same songs, but in a different order were released on Verve MGV 8004 (also Verve V6-8004) "The Genius Of Charlie Parker, #2 - April In Paris" Other songs are on Verve MGV 8003 "The Genius Of Charlie Parker, #1 - Night And Day", and on MGV 8000, "The Charlie Parker Story #1".

In 1974, Verve Records (MV 2562) released a live version called "Charlie Parker With Strings – Midnight Jazz At Carnegie Hall". Other later live and studio releases exist, most of them on compilation albums.

A special Charlie Parker With Strings: The Alternate Takes was released on Record Store Day 2019. This edition, available in record stores only on April 13, 2019, contained numerous alternate takes not used on the previous vinyl releases, and was presented on a bright blue vinyl LP.
