= King Porter Stomp =

Jazz composition by Jelly Roll Morton

"King Porter Stomp" is a jazz standard by pianist Jelly Roll Morton, first recorded in 1923. The composition is considered to be important in the development of jazz. It became a hit during the swing era, when it was recorded by Benny Goodman.

== History ==
According to Jelly Roll Morton, the tune was composed in 1906 and was the first "stomp" in the history of jazz. Morton first recorded the number in 1923 as a piano solo, but did not file a copyright on the tune until 1924. That year, he recorded a duet version with Joe "King" Oliver on cornet. Morton said that he had actually written the tune almost 20 years earlier, and that it was named after his friend and fellow pianist Porter King. According to S. Brun Campbell, Morton was having difficulty finishing the piece and sent it to Scott Joplin, who was living in St. Louis, for help.

On July 1, 1935, Benny Goodman and his orchestra recorded Fletcher Henderson's arrangement of the number, backed with "Sometimes I'm Happy". It was released July 31 as Victor 25090, and became a sizeable hit and a standard of the big band era. Goodman's recording featured the well known trumpeter of the day Bunny Berigan. Fletcher Henderson had recorded his own arrangement several times with his own band during the 1920s and early 1930s. Harry James recorded a version in 1939 on Brunswick 8366. Other big bands also recorded the tune, as did more traditional jazz groups.

Jimmy Dorsey and his Orchestra perform a version (uncredited) in the 1944 film Hollywood Canteen.

Late 1960s "space-age" bandleader Pat Williams recorded the song on his 1968 Verve LP Shades of Today.

In 1975, Gil Evans and his orchestra arranged a new cover in There Comes a Time album, with Tony Williams, David Sanborn and George Adams among others.

The American jazz trio Air recorded the tune for their 1979 album Air Lore.

== See also ==
- Stomp progression
- Stop-time
- List of 1920s jazz standards
