= Miracle of Love (song) =

Single by Eileen Rodgers
- B-side: "Unwanted Heart"
- Released: June 4, 1956
- Genre: Pop
- Length: 2:25
- Label: Columbia
- Songwriter(s): Bob Merrill

Eileen Rodgers singles chronology
"Some of These Days" (1956)	"Miracle of Love" (1956)	"Give Me" (1956)

"Miracle of Love" is a song written by Bob Merrill and performed by Eileen Rodgers. It reached #18 on the U.S. pop chart in 1956.

== Other charting versions ==
- Ginny Gibson released a version of the song as a single in 1956 which reached #68 on the U.S. pop chart.
