= Ginny Gibson =

Virginia Nelson

Virginia Nelson (born Virginia Marie Shoemaker; November 22, 1924 Rochester, New York – November 27, 1998 Nyack, New York), professionally known as Ginny Gibson, was a prolific New York recording vocalist. Gibson recorded jingles and popular songs. Her married surname, beginning around 1946, was Nelson. In 1958, she married Richard Dennis Criger (1925–2001). She divorced Criger in 1976. Gibson also recorded under the alias "Ginny Blue."

== Career ==
Virginia Shoemaker, as a performer, began singing at age 6 for WHAM radio in Rochester, New York. In 1950, Gibson signed a contract with MGM Records. She was the first to record the song s "Mr. Sandman," "If I Give My Heart to You," and "Dansero." Her recording of "Whatever Lola Wants" from Damn Yankees won national radio and jukebox play. Her manager while at MGM was Joan Javits (né Joan Ellen Javits; born 1931), who in 1953, co-wrote Santa Baby with Philip Springer (born 1926). The other co-composer, Tony Springer, listed in the 1953 Catalog of Copyright Entries, was a fictitious name. Joan was the niece of New York Senator Jacob K. Javits.

In 1954, Gibson recorded 966 new tunes for such songwriters that included Irving Berlin; Cole Porter; Pajama Game and Damn Yankees writers Jerry Ross and Dick Adler; Charles Tobias; and Pat Ballard.

Gibson also sang radio and TV commercials, including the famous "Chiquita Banana," "Hello, Bryers Calling," "Winston Tastes Good," "The Dodge Boys," "Wouldn't You Really Rather Have a Buick?" and "Pepsodent Toothpaste."

She was the off-stage voice on the Coke Time with Eddie Fisher television show, working with Doc Severinsen, Eydie Gormé, and Debbie Reynolds. She was also heard regularly on the Chicago radio show Don McNeill's Breakfast Club and television's The Halls of Ivy and Sky King.

== Selected discography ==
=== M-G-M Records ===
1. 10661 (April 1950)
  Ginny Gibson
  With Van Horne Quartet
  Side A: "You're Finding Out How Much I Love You"
  Carl G. Lampl (1898–1962) (music)
  Buddy Kaye (words)
  48-S-551
  Side B: "Where in the World"
  Ginny Gibson, vocalist
  Gibson Boys, vocalists
  48-S-550
  Carl G. Lampl (1898–1962)
  Buddy Kaye
2. 11276
  Buddy Kaye Quintet
  Ginny Gibson
  Side A: "The Sunday Morning Song"
  48-S-552
  Carl G. Lampl (1898–1962) (music)
  Buddy Kaye (words)
  Side B: "The Goodnight Song"
  48-S-553
  Buddy Kaye
  Carl G. Lampl (1898–1962)
3. 11383 (1952)
  Ginny Gibson
  Side A: "Too Far Between Kisses"
  48-S-817
  Side B: "You Blew Me a Kiss" 48-S-816
  (Audio on YouTube)
4. 11435 (1953)
  Ginny Gibson
  With Orchestra
  LeRoy Holmes, conductor
  Side A: "The Kiss"
  (from the 1953 film Niagara)
  Haven Gillespie (words)
  Lionel Newman (music)
  53-S-5
  Side B: "Condemned Without a Trial"
  Hal Blair (né Harold Keller Brown; 1915–2001) (w&m)
  Don Robertson (w&m)
  53-S-6
5. 11499
  Ginny Gibson
  With Joe Lipman
  Side A: "Unless You're Really Mine"
  Ted Varnick (w&m)
  Nick Acquaviva (w&m)
  53-S-199
  (Audio on YouTube)
  Side B: "Lonely Lover"
  53-S-198
  Herbert Nelson (Note: Herbert Nelson (de) (né Herbert Lewysohn; October 31, 1910 Berlin – 18 May 1988 Riverdale, New York) was a German-born American cabaret artist and notable lyricist. He was the son of Rudolf Nelson.) (music)
  Fred Jacobson (Note: Fred Jacobson (né Friedrich Alex Jacobson; 1914–1988) was an Austrian-born American songwriter. He sometimes published songs under pseudonyms Fred Jay and Fritz Jahn.) (words)
6. 11571 (1953)
  Ginny Gibson
  With Joe Lipman
  Side A: "Dansero"
  53-S-345
  Heyman-Daniels-Parker
  Side B: "No More Tears"
  53-S-344
  Frank Feraco (words)
  Harry Siskind (words)
  Paul Todd (music)
  OCLC 761848657
7. 11672
  Ginny Gibson
  With orchestra
  Joe Lipman, director
  Side A: "Baton Rouge"
  Bob Merrill (w&m)
  53-S-608
  Side B: "Don't Stop Kissing Me Goodnight"
  Sheb Wooley (w&m)
  53-S-610
8. 11736 (1953)
  Ginny Gibson
  With Orchestra
  Joe Lipman, director
  Side A: "Aye Aye Aye Aye"
  Gloria Shane (words)
  Joe Lipman (music)
  Noel Regney
  53-S-609
  Side B: "Serenade to Spring"
  Dick Charles
  Gloria Regney
  53-S-607
  OCLC 913509385, 79344796
9. 11814 (1954)
  Ginny Gibson
  Side A: "The Song That Broke My Heart"
  54-S-358
  Side B: "There's a Small Hotel"
  54-S-356
  OCLC 83739456
10. 11913 (1954)
  Ginny Gibson
  With Joe Lipman
  Side A: "Once There Was a Little Girl"
  54-S-355
  Hayward Morris (1922–1977) (music)
  Lee Kauderer (Note: Lee Kauderer (né Leon Kauderer; 26 February 1919 Philadelphia – 15 April 1969 Philadelphia), in 1954, founded Marlyn Music Publishers, Inc., in New York, a member of BMI. He also owned Overbrook Publishing, a member of ASCAP. And, with Harold Lipsious (né Harold Bernard Lipsius; 1913–2007), he co-owned Sherwood Artists Management, Inc. In 1955, musician-arranger-manager Teddy McRae became General Manager of Marlyn Music ... all located at 650 Fifth Avenue, New York. As a songwriter, he published over 100 songs; although he was primarily a Philadelphia-based osteopathic physician.) (words)
  Side B: "Like Ma-A-D"
  54-S-357
  Alice D. Simms (w&m)
  Irving Roth (music)
11. 11961 (March 1955)
  Ginny Gibson
  The Four Jingles (vocals)
  Side A: "Whatever Lola Wants" ("Lola Gets")
  From the musical Damn Yankees
  Richard Adler (w&m)
  Jerry Ross (w&m)
  (Audio on YouTube)
  Side B: "If Anything Should Happen to You"
  Dick Charles (w&m)
  Fred Ebb (w&m)
  55-S-312
  OCLC 761848652
12. 12019 (July 1955)
  Ginny Gibson
  With Orchestra
  Joe Lipman, conductor
  The Four Jingles (on Side B)
  Side A: "Chihuahua Choo-Choo" ("Chi-Wa-Wa")
  From the Los Angeles revue:
  That's Life (1954)
  Jay Livingston (w&m)
  Ray Evans (w&m)
  55-XY-219
  Side B: "Am I Asking Too Much?"
  Robert Bergman (w&m)
  Harry Evans (w&m)
  George Ames (w&m)
  55-XY-217
13. 12113 (1955)
  Ginny Gibson
  With Orchestra
  And the Jingles
  Joe Lipman, conductor
  Side A: OHH ("How I Love Ya'")
  Parker
  55-XY-578
  Side B: "If You Want To Make Me Happy"
  Harold Solomon (music)
  Jack Segal (words)
  55-S-765
  OCLC 80800669
14. 12517
  Ginny Gibson
  With orchestra
  Joe Lipman, conductor
  And with the Jingles
  Side A: "If That Would Bring You Back To Me"
  Eddie Seiler (w&m)
  Sol Marcus (w&m)
  55-XY-580
  Side B: "The Places I've Been"
  Sy Muskin
  Sol Parker
  55-XY-577

=== Mercury Records ===
15. 5405 (1950)
  Recorded March 14, 1950, New York
  Bobby Sherwood (trumpet, piano, guitar, vocals, arranger), Lou Oles, Carl Poole (né Carl Alan Poole; 1920–1986), Pincus (Pinky) Savitt (1919–1998) (trumpets), Eddie Anderson, Bob Cutshall, Kai Winding (trombones), Hymie Shertzer, Ernie Caceres (alto saxes), Johnny Hayes, Babe Russin (tenor saxes), Tony Ferina (bari sax), Lou Stein (piano), Sid Weiss (bass), Morey Feld (drums), Ginny Gibson (vocalist)
  Side A: "Muskrat Ramble"
  Sherwood & Gibson (vocals)
  Ray Gilbert (words)
  Edward "Kid" Ory (music)
  3235
  Side B: "Dixieland Ball"
  Ginny Gibson (vocals)
  Buddy Kaye (words)
  Al Frisch (né Albert T. Frisch; 1916–1976) (music)
  3237
16. 5468 (1950)
  Recorded March 14, 1950, New York
  Ginny Gibson
  Bobby Sherwood
  And His Orchestra
  (same musicians as 5405)
  Side A: "Cherry Bounce"
  Charles Columbus (w&m)
  3238
  (Audio on YouTube)
  Side B: "Doodle-Doo-Doo"
  Art Kassel (w&m)
  Mel Stitzel (music)
  3236

=== Voco Records (sub-label: Tops for Tots) ===
17. Tops for Tots V29
  Bernie Knee (vocals)
  Ginny Gibson (vocals)
  With the Tops Orchestra
  Side B: Kiddie Medley
  "Row, Row, Row Your Boat"
  "Brother John" ("Frère Jacques")
18. Voco V30T (1951)
  Ginny Gibson
  (singer and narrator)
  With the Voco Orchestra
  Side A: Little Red Ridinghood
  Ted Murry
  (pseudonym of Murray Mencher (de); 1898–1991) (music)
  Raymond Leveen (1893–1984) (words)
19. Tops for Tots V33
  Bob Kennedy (narrator and singer)
  Ginny Gibson (narrator and singer)
  Sides A & B: Cinderella

=== RCA Victor Records ===
20. 47-4212
  Ginny Gibson
  With Hugo Winterhalter and Orchestra
  Side B: "Blow, Blow Winds of the Sea" (1953)
  Harold Duncan (w&m)
  E1-VB-2901-1
  OCLC 77921198
  (Audio on YouTube)
21. 47-4510 (1952)
  The Three Suns
  Artie Dunn (vocal refrain)
  Ginny Gibson (vocal refrain)
  Side A: "Stolen Love"
  Anna Marie Sickle (w&m)
  Marlene Feinstein (w&m)
  E2-VB-5543
  OCLC 80134629
  (Audio on YouTube)
  Side B: "Cool, Cool Kisses"
22. EPB 3051 (1953) (7" 45 rpm; 2 discs)
  LPM 1185 (1956) (LP)
  Music by Starlight
  Hugo Winterhalter and his Orchestra
  Eddie Heywood (piano); Ginny Gibson (vocals)
  Stuart Foster
  (stage name for Tamer Aswad; 1923–1968)
  OCLC 12935721, 288945583

=== Jubilee Records ===
23. 45-6027 (1953)
  Ginny Gibson
  And the Shepherds (Side A)
  With Billy Mure, guitarist (Side A)
  With the Country Slickers (Side B)
  Side A: "If the End of the World Came Tonight"
  Sid Lippman (music)
  Sylvia Dee (words)
  45-T5-107
  Side B: "Ain't It Great to Be Crazy"
  Sid Lippman (music)
  Sylvia Dee (words)
  45-T5-108
  Note: Red record vinyl
  OCLC 81824861, 732376947

=== ABC-Paramount Records ===
24. 45-9717 (Jun 1956)
  Don Costa Orchestra
  With Ginny Gibson
  Side A: "Lullaby To An Angel"
  Dick Broderick (Note: Dick Broderick was the pseudonym of Dick Criger (né Richard Dennis Criger; 1925–2001) who was married to Ginny Gibson from 1958 to 1976, when they divorced.) (w&m)
  346-N1
  OCLC 80793325
  Side B: "Magic Melody"
  Earl Stanley Shuman (born 1923) (words)
  Mort Garson
  345-N1
  OCLC 84532230
25. 45-9739 (1956)
  Ginny Gibson
  With Don Costa and His Orchestra
  Side A: "Miracle of Love"
  Bob Merrill (words)
  AMP 45-465
  (Audio on YouTube)
  Side B: "Two Innocent Hearts"
  Dorian Burton (w&m)
  Lee Pincus (w&m)
  AMP 45-466
  OCLC 808641806, 78875793
  (Audio on YouTube)
  Re-released by:
  Sparton Records
  526R (catalog no.)
26. 45-9786 (February 1957)
  With orchestra and chorus
  Don Costa, director
  Side A: "I Pledge Allegiance To Your Heart"
  William "Bill" Norvas (w&m)
  AMP 45-695
  Side B: "A Pair of Fools"
  Bennie Benjamin (w&m)
  Sol Marcus (w&m)
  AMP 45-696
  Re-released by:
  Sparton Records
  370R (catalog no.)
27. 9872 (December 1957)
  Ginny Gibson
  Side A: "September 'til June"
  Sol Parker (né Solomon Peskin; 1919–2010) (w&m)
  Dick Broderick (w&m)
  3044
  Side B: "Homing Pigeon"
  Mel Mandel (Note: Mel Mandel (aka Mel Mandell) was a lyricist and music journalist. He also wrote lyrics under pseudonym Robert Lean.) (words)
  Marvin Kahn (1915–1969) (music)
  3045
  Re-released by:
  Sparton Records
  520R (catalog no.)

=== Forum Records (Charles Records) ===
28. F703 (1962)
  Ginny Gibson
  Side A: "Hand of Love"
  Dick Broderick
  61-L-7
  Side B: "Stay Here, Bluebird"
  Adaptation from Massenet's "Elegy"
  Fay Tishman (1913–2006) (Note: Fay Tishman (née Frances Fay Hartman; 1913–2006) was a member of ASCAP (see ASCAP Biographical Dictionary, 4th ed., 1980 – below, under "Inline citations")) (words and arr.)
29. 85276 (July 1962)
  Ginny Gibson
  Dick Wess Orchestra
  Side A: "As The World Turns"
  Dick Charles (music)
  Fay Tishman (words)
  ZTSP 85276
  Side B: "That's How Love Comes"
  Dick Charles (music)
  Robert Wilde (pseudonym of Robert Goldstein) (w&m)
30. DC102469 (1969)
  Ginny Gibson
  Side B: "Lonely Little Christmas Tree"
  Dick Charles
  DC102469B

=== Davis Records (Joe Davis) ===
31. 442-45 (October 1955)
  Ginny Gibson
  Accompanied by the Song Spinners
  Side A: "Wanting You"
  Robert Maurice Wilson (born 1921) (w&m)
  DA-350-45
  Side B: "Mommy's Little Angel"
  Glenn Gibson
  (pseudonym of Bert Davis) (Note: "Glenn Gibson" was a pseudonym for Bert Davis, which, in turn, was a pseudonym for Bertha Davis, of which there were two Bertha's married to music publisher and producer Joe Davis – (i) Bertha Thalheimer (1997–1939) and (ii) Bertha "Bert" Kapp (1903–1973), sister of record producer and executive, Jack Kapp. In the case of "Bert Davis," Musicologist Eugene Chadbourne of AllMusic raises questions of songwriter attribution, not specific to "Mommy's Little Angel," but to all works connected to Joe Davis, including works under other pseudonyms, including Howard Richards, Billy Collins, Rinky Scott Jones, Phoebe Snow (not the famous one), Glenn Gibson, and Adrienne Garblik. "Garblik" was surname of the husband of his daughter, Lucille Joan (1927–2002). ("Bert 'Bertha' Davis," biography, by Eugene Chadbourne, AllMusic, online; retrieved June 15, 2017))
  DA-349-45
  "Wanting You" also
  Released by Derby
  Cat No. 810; mx DA-171
  OCLC 82887565

=== Kama Records ===
32. K-35 (May 1962)
  Ginny Gibson
  R. Wess Orchestra
  Side A: "You Pass This Way" ("Only Once")
  Sunny Skylar (w&m)
  Al Frisch (né Albert T. Frisch; 1916–1976)
  R. Wess (arr.)
  500
  Side B: "Bluesville"
  Dick Charles
  Dick Criger
  Kama was a division of Kama Productions, 9 Meadow Street, New York Mills, New York

== Selected radio transcriptions ==
The Eddie Safranski Orchestra, SESAC transcriptions

33. Program #N-902 (May 17, 1955)
  1. "Oh Me! Oh My," Jack Haskell (vocalist)
  2. "Walking Down The Aisle," Jack Haskell (vocalist)
  3. "Do You," Ginny Gibson & Jack Haskell (vocalists)
  4. "I Can't Forget You," Ginny Gibson (vocalist)
  5. "Indian War Dance" Eddie Safranski and His Orchestra, Ginny Gibson, Jack Haskell
34. Program #N-903 (May 17, 1955)
  1. "Cuttin'Capers," Jack Haskell (vocalist)
  2. "The Way I Think of You," Jack Haskell (vocalist)
  3. "Nevada Hop," Ginny Gibson, vocalist
  4. "I Wonder Why," Ginny Gibson (vocalist)
  5. "Scutter-Botch," Eddie Safranski and His Orchestra, Ginny Gibson, Jack Haskell
35. Program #N-904
  1. "Breezy," Ginny Gibson (vocalist)
  2. "Do You Remember," Ginny Gibson (vocalist)
  3. "Swingin' On a Rainbow," Ginny Gibson (vocalist)
  4. "Dreaming By The Fire," Ginny Gibson (vocalist)
  5. "Doodle Bug," Eddie Safranski and His Orchestra, Ginny Gibson

Bud's Bandwagon

36. Program 533, Part 1 (June 8, 1955)
  Bud's Bandwagon
  Armed Forces Radio and Television Service (AFRTS)
  Broadcast June 8, 1955
  1. "Like Mad," Ginny Gibson
  2. "Tara's Theme," Sam "The Man" Taylor, tenor sax
  3. "Write Me Baby," The Four Knights
  4. "How Important Can It Be?" Sarah Vaughan
  5. "Red Wing," George Lewis and his New Orleans Rhythm Boys
  6. Bud interviews Earle Lyon (1918–2012) and Richard Bartlett who plug their 1955 film, The Silver Star
  Radio transcription disc
  OCLC 247491155
  Bud's Bandwagon was a radio program of the Armed Forces Radio and Television Service, aired five days a week for four years. Bud Widom (né Leonard Widom; 1918–1976) was the DJ host. The music was from extant recordings rather than live performances.

== Personal life ==
Ginny Gibson's father Wayne A. Shoemaker had, at one time, been Public Relations Director of the Rochester Civic Music Association. Wayne Shoemaker was also a strong regional chess player — affiliated with the Finger Lakes Chess Society.

Virginia M. Criger died November 27, 1998, in Nyack, New York.

== Selected compositions ==
- "What a Nervous Situation"

Ginny Gibson (w&m)
Dick Broderick (w&m)
© Sikorski Music Corp., New York
31 January 1956; EP96565
