= Dance Bash =

Studio album by Charlie Barnet and his Orchestra
- Released: 1956
- Recorded: 1947–1952
- Genre: Big band jazz, swing
- Label: Verve

Professional ratings
Review scores
Source	Rating
Allmusic	4/5 stars

Dance Bash is a studio album by Charlie Barnet and his Orchestra released on Verve Records LP record MGV-2007 in 1956.

== Recording ==
The album was recorded in several sessions between the years 1947 and 1952, in sessions produced by Norman Granz. The album's lead track, "Jubilee Jump" was recorded in New York City on August 25, 1947, in a session for Apollo Records. Four songs were recorded by Barnet for this date, three of which originally appeared as 78 rpm singles. Only this one track from the session makes it onto this album. It was originally released as Apollo 1092. Although recorded for Apollo, the rights for this and all subsequent Barnet sessions done for Apollo were retained by Granz, allowing its appearance here. Before appearing on this LP, it also was released as a single on Granz's Clef Records as catalog #8982. "Charleston Alley" is from November 30, 1947. This recording made its debut on Clef single #8981. From the same session come "Gal from Joe's" (originally Clef 8979) and "Southern Fried" (Clef 8982.) The standard "Deep Purple" again originally appeared on Apollo (as #1092), from a September 2, 1947 5-song session where three of the tracks were for Apollo, and the remaining 2 were for the V-Disc program. "Blue Lou" is the earliest recording on the album. It is from the earliest session that appears on this album, taking place on February 3, 1947. This session consisted of four songs, each of which appeared on Apollo as 78 rpm singles. "Charleston Alley" was recorded "Blue Lou" was originally released as Apollo 1082. Rounding out side 1 were Barnet's two biggest his: Cherokee and Skyliner. These two songs were recorded March 5, 1951, in Los Angeles. They originally appeared on Clef 8981 and 8979, respectively. All of these songs appearing on side 1 were first issued on Clef LP MCG114. Side 2 consists of tracks recorded on July 9 and 10. All of these were originally issued in the Clef 89000 single series, except for "St. Louis Blues" which is original to this album and has not otherwise been issued.

== Reception ==
Although most of these tracks have not been officially issued in digital format, Scott Yanow has stated the album is "excellent" and therefore "worth searching for."

== Track listing ==
No.	Title	recording date	Length
1.	"Jubilee Jump" (Gibson)	August 25, 1947
2.	"Charleston Alley" (Henderson - Kirkland - Wright)	November 30, 1947
3.	"Gal from Joe's" (Mills - Ellington)	November 30, 1947
4.	"Deep Purple" (Parish - De Rose)	September 2, 1947
5.	"Blue Lou" (Sampson - Mills)	February 3, 1947
6.	"Southern Fried" (Leonard - Culliver - Ross)	November 30, 1947
7.	"Cherokee" (Noble)	March 5, 1951
8.	"Skyliner" (Barnet)	March 5, 1951
9.	"Fur Trapper's Boogie" (Barnet)	July 9, 1952
10.	"Wosie Posie" (Gibson - Davis)	July 10, 1952
11.	"Let's Blow the Blues" (Paland - Barnet)	July 9, 1952
12.	"Rhubarb" (Cohn)	July 10, 1952
13.	"St. Louis Blues" (Handy)	July 9, 1952
14.	"Swinging Down the Lane" (Kahn - Jones)	July 9, 1952
15.	"Who's Sorry Now" (Snyder - Ruby - Kolmar(sic))	July 9, 1952

== Personnel ==
- Bob Bain - guitar
- Charlie Barnet - soprano, alto, tenor saxophones
- Walt Benson - trombone
- Kurt Bloom - tenor sax
- Frank Bradley - trombone
- James Campbell - trumpet
- Porky Cohen - trombone
- Don Davidson - baritone sax
- Bob Dawes - baritone sax
- Joe Graves - trumpet
- Jack Henderson - tenor sax
- Burt Johnson - trombone
- Hank Jones - piano
- Dick Kenney - trombone
- Al Killian - trumpet
- Don Lamond - drums
- Irving Lewis - trumpet
- Mundell Lowe - guitar
- Everett McDonald - trumpet
- Guy McReynolds - alto sax
- Obie Massingill - trombone
- Bill Miller - piano
- Dave Nichols - trumpet
- Wayne Nichols - trumpet
- Ray Norman - tenor sax
- Jimmy Nottingham - trumpet
- Dick Paladino - alto sax
- Frank Papalardo - alto sax
- Tommy Pederson - trombone
- Bob Peterson - bass
- Al Porcino - trumpet
- Don Raffael - tenor sax
- Art Robey - trumpet
- Shorty Rogers - trumpet
- Stan Seckler - alto sax
- Doc Severinsen - trumpet
- Dick Shanahan - drums
- Charlie Shavers - trumpet
- Dick Sherman - trumpet
- Frank Sivaro - bass
- John Soltaine - trombone
- Clark Terry - trumpet
- Phil Washburne - trombone
- Walt Weidler - alto sax
- Fred Zito - trombone
