= Virtuoso No. 4 =

Studio album by Joe Pass
- Released: 1983
- Recorded: November 11, 26 and 30, 1973
- Studio: MGM Recording Studios, Los Angeles
- Genre: Jazz
- Length: 103:12
- Label: Pablo
- Producer: Norman Granz

Joe Pass chronology
Eximious (1982)	Virtuoso No. 4 (1983)	Speak Love (1983)

Virtuoso No. 4 is an album by jazz guitarist Joe Pass that was recorded in 1973 and released in 1983.

It was re-issued in 1993 on CD with three additional tracks ("Weaselocity", "Blues for Pete", and "What Are You Doing the Rest of Your Life?"). Virtuoso No. 4 differs from the three previous Virtuoso releases in that it is performed on acoustic guitar instead of electric (with the exception of "Indian Summer").

== Reception ==
Professional ratings
Review scores
Source	Rating
Allmusic	4/5 stars
The Rolling Stone Jazz Record Guide	4/5 stars
The Penguin Guide to Jazz Recordings	3/4 stars

Writing for Allmusic, music critic Scott Yanow wrote of the album "The relatively little-known set finds the guitarist sounding very much like a self-sufficient orchestra, and although his tone is necessarily softer on acoustic than electric, he swings hard on the uptempo pieces."

== Track listing ==
1. "Lush Life" (Billy Strayhorn) – 4:55
2. "Indian Summer" (Victor Herbert, Al Dubin) – 3:16
3. "Autumn Leaves" (Joseph Kosma, Jacques Prévert, Johnny Mercer) – 5:40
4. "Yesterday" (Lennon–McCartney) – 4:24
5. "Come Sunday" (Duke Ellington) – 3:46
6. "Lover Man" (Jimmy Davis, Ram Ramirez, James Sherman) – 6:18
7. "Come Rain or Come Shine" (Harold Arlen, Mercer) – 3:37
8. "My Shining Hour" (Arlen, Mercer) – 4:25
9. "I'll Remember April" (Gene de Paul, Patricia Johnston, Don Raye) – 4:55
10. "Some Day My Prince Will Come" (Frank Churchill, Larry Morey) – 3:21
11. "Weaselocity" (Joe Pass) – 6:54
12. "Acoustic Blues" (Pass) – 6:46
13. "I Can't Get Started" (Ira Gershwin, Vernon Duke) – 4:10
14. "It's a Wonderful World" (Harold Adamson, Jan Savitt, Johnny Watson) – 3:20
15. "Now's the Time" (Charlie Parker) – 7:03
16. "The Man I Love" (George Gershwin, Ira Gershwin) – 5:47
17. "The Nearness of You" (Hoagy Carmichael, Ned Washington) – 4:03
18. "Limehouse Blues" (Philip Braham, Douglas Furber) – 4:46
19. "Easy Living" (Ralph Rainger, Leo Robin) – 6:57
20. "Blues for Pete" (Pass) – 3:21
21. "What Are You Doing the Rest of Your Life?" (Alan Bergman, Marilyn Bergman, Michel Legrand) – 5:28

== Personnel ==
- Joe Pass - guitar
- Norman Granz – producer
