= Eximious =

Studio album by Joe Pass and Niels-Henning Ørsted Pedersen
- Released: 1982
- Recorded: May 25 and July 8, 1982
- Studios: Group IV Studios, Hollywood, California
- Genre: Jazz
- Length: 47:32
- Label: Pablo
- Producer: Norman Granz

Joe Pass chronology
| Ira, George and Joe (1981) | Eximious (1982) | Virtuoso No. 4 (1983) |

Eximious is an album by jazz guitarist Joe Pass and double bassist Niels-Henning Ørsted Pedersen that was released in 1982.

== Reception ==
Professional ratings
Review scores
| Source | Rating |
|---|---|
| Allmusic | 4/5 stars |
| The Rolling Stone Jazz Record Guide | 3/5 stars |
| The Penguin Guide to Jazz Recordings | 3/4 stars |

Writing for Allmusic, music critic Scott Yanow wrote of the album "Pass swings hard throughout, is consistently inventive within the bebop tradition, and indulges in close interplay with Pedersen. Together, these musicians make the wondrous seem effortless."

== Track listing ==
1. "A Foxy Chick and a Cool Cat" (Joe Pass) – 5:29
2. "Robbins Nest" (Illinois Jacquet, Sir Charles Thompson) – 4:07
3. "Lush Life" (Billy Strayhorn) – 2:47
4. "Serenata" (Leroy Anderson, Mitchell Parish) – 3:24
5. "Love for Sale" (Cole Porter) – 7:29
6. "Night and Day" (Porter) – 5:34
7. "We'll Be Together Again" (Carl Fischer, Frankie Laine) – 5:32
8. "Ev'rything I Love" (Porter) – 5:01
9. "Ev'rything I've Got" (Richard Rodgers, Lorenz Hart) – 3:01
10. "Speak Low" (Ogden Nash, Kurt Weill) – 5:08

== Personnel ==
- Joe Pass - guitar
- Niels-Henning Ørsted Pedersen – double bass
- Martin Drew – drums
