= Hank Wayland =

American jazz musician

Hank Frederic Gregson Wayland (January 21, 1906 in Fall River, Massachusetts – March 27, 1983 in California) was an American swing jazz double-bassist.

== Early life ==
Frederic Gregson Wayland, born as Fredrick Gregson Wayland, the eldest son of Walter Marble Wayland, (who was also a musician), and his mother, Emily Hindle, was born in England. He later moved to New York and met the woman that would later become his wife, Hazel Mae Watts.

== Career ==
Wayland learned music from his father and played in high school bands. He moved to New York City in 1926, where he played the double bass in theater orchestras and in the studios. His credits in the 1930s include time with Benny Goodman (1934), Red Norvo (1934), Artie Shaw (1936), Bunny Berigan (1937–39), and Larry Clinton (1939–41). He played with Bob Chester in 1941-42, then moved to California the following year, there he played with Eddie Miller and Wingy Manone in addition to more work as a studio musician. He faded from the scene after the 1950s, and moved to Glendale, California. He appeared in bit parts in low-budget Hollywood films; however, he did appear without credits in Stars and Stripes Forever (film).

== Personal life ==
Wayland married Hazel Watts in 1929 and they had two sons, Noel, and Ronald, and later a daughter, Dianne. During The Depression, Wayland was forced to send his sons to Florida to live with his wife's brother while be toured the US and in Europe, eventually relocating his family to Glendale California. He officially retired from his music career in 1968.

== Illness and death ==
Wayland was diagnosed with colon cancer in 1978 and had a colectomy, and later that year he was suspected of suffering from Alzheimer's disease. He died peacefully on March 27, 1983, while living in a retirement home.
