= Ira, George and Joe =

Studio album by Joe Pass
- Released: 1982
- Recorded: November 23, 1981
- Studio: Group IV Recording Studios, Hollywood, California
- Genre: Jazz
- Length: 45:40
- Label: Pablo Today
- Producer: Norman Granz

Joe Pass chronology
Checkmate (1981)	Ira, George and Joe (1982)	Eximious (1982)

Ira, George and Joe is an album by jazz guitarist Joe Pass, released in 1982. It was re-issued in 1994 on CD by Original Jazz Classics. It is a tribute album to the songs of George Gershwin and Ira Gershwin.

The photo on the front cover was created by Phil Stern. There is also another version of this cover from 1982 that contains the text "Joe Pass Loves Gershwin" instead of just "Joe Pass".

== Reception ==
Professional ratings
Review scores
Source	Rating
AllMusic	4/5 stars
The Penguin Guide to Jazz Recordings	3/4 stars

AllMusic's Scott Yanow wrote: "The melodies are quite familiar ('Bidin' My Time' is the closest one to an obscurity), and few surprises occur, but the music swings and the results are quite enjoyable."

== Track listing ==
All tracks are written by George Gershwin and Ira Gershwin.

No.	Title	Length
1.	"Bidin' My Time"	5:06
2.	"How Long Has This Been Going On?"	3:24
3.	"Soon"	3:51
4.	"Oh, Lady Be Good!"	4:23
5.	"But Not for Me"	3:13
6.	"A Foggy Day"	2:43
7.	"It Ain't Necessarily So"	5:47
8.	"Love Is Here to Stay"	5:06
9.	"'S Wonderful"	3:24
10.	"Nice Work If You Can Get It"	3:40
11.	"Embraceable You"	4:40

== Personnel ==
- Joe Pass – guitar
- John Pisano – guitar
- Jim Hughart – double bass
- Shelly Manne – drums
