= Memorial Album (Bunny Berigan album) =

1944 jazz album by Bunny Berigan

Bunny Berigan: Memorial Album
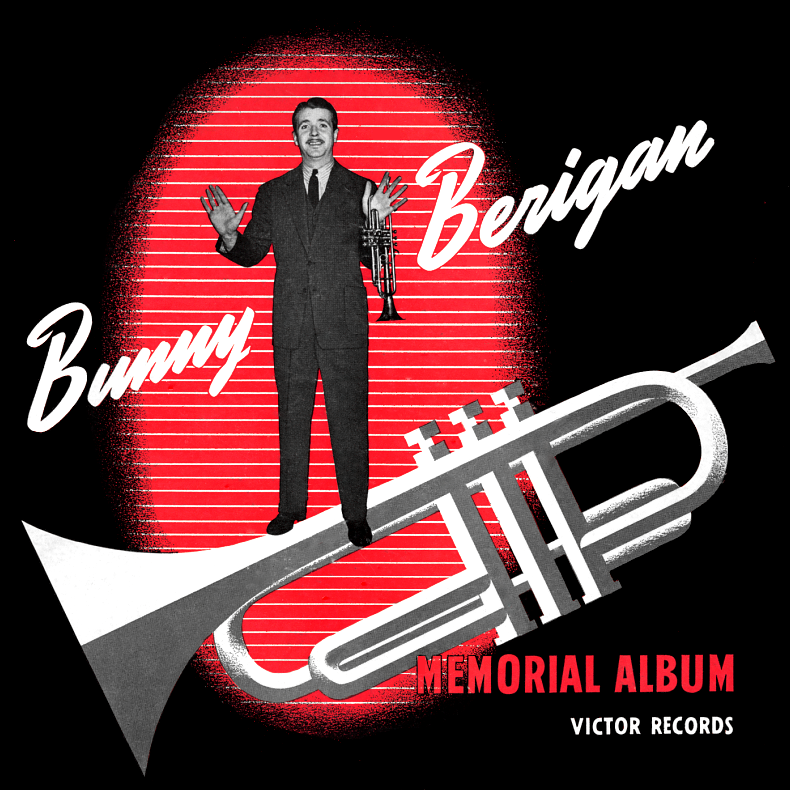

Compilation album by Bunny Berigan
- Released: November 1944
- Recorded: 1937, 1938
- Genre: Swing, jazz
- Label: Victor

Memorial Album is a compilation album by trumpeter Bunny Berigan that was released posthumously. Drawn from sessions where he was bandleader of his Orchestra, tributes from publications appeared on the inside of the cover titled "Final Salute to Bunny Berigan".

== Reception ==
Professional ratings
Review scores
Source	Rating
Billboard	highly favorable

In November 1944, critics hailed the album as a testimonial to the late Berigan's playing style. Due to similarities in tone, phrasing, and ability, Berigan was often compared to Bix Beiderbecke. His early death due to complications from alcoholism added to the comparison because Beiderbecke, too, was an alcoholic. "One of these years they're going to start talking about Bunny Berigan the way they now talk about Bix Beiderbecke. And they'll be right, of course." A reviewer for Billboard magazine said the album would be cherished like the early albums by Armstrong and Beiderbecke.

The liner notes to the album were reprinted from a 1942 memorial tribute to Bunny Berigan by critic George T. Simon for Metronome magazine. They were republished in Simon's 1970 collection "Simon Says," an anthology he compiled of his writings about the big bands from 1935 to 1955 for Metronome.

"I Can't Get Started," the first song on the album, was originally recorded on a 12-inch 78 rpm master and played for 4 minutes 45 seconds. For the Memorial Album it was cut to fit onto a 10-inch master by removing the long, bravura trumpet introduction and starting the performance at the initial statement of the song's melody.

== Track listing ==
These reissued songs were featured on a 4-disc, 78 rpm album set, Victor P-134.

Disc 1: (20-1500)

1. "Frankie and Johnnie", recorded June 25, 1937.
2. "I Can't Get Started", recorded August 7, 1937.

Disc 2: (20-1501)

3. "Russian Lullaby", recorded December 23, 1937.
4. "Trees", recorded December 23, 1937.

Disc 3: (20-1502)

5. "Black Bottom", recorded December 23, 1937.
6. "Jelly Roll Blues", recorded November 22, 1938.

Disc 4: (20-1503)

7. "'Deed I Do", recorded November 22, 1938.
8. "High Society", recorded September 13, 1938.
