= Danny Richards =

American jazz musician (1918–1998)

Daniel Vincent Richards
- Born: April 22, 1918; Scranton, Pennsylvania, U.S.
- Died: February 16, 1998 (aged 79); Scranton, Pennsylvania, U.S.
- Occupations: Vocalist, clothing salesman
- Years active: 1930s–1940s

Daniel Vincent Richards (April 22, 1918 – February 16, 1998) was an American big band vocalist in the 1930s and 1940s, primarily known for working with bandleader Bunny Berigan's popular swing outfit. His smooth vocal style was well-utilized on ballads and mid-tempo numbers. After Berigan's death in 1941, Richards was heard less frequently. He was born in Scranton, Pennsylvania.

Richards was born in Scranton, Pennsylvania on April 22, 1918. He served during WWII, and afterwards he became a clothing salesman.

Richards died at his home in Scranton on February 16, 1998, at the age of 79.

== Bibliography ==
- Erwin, Pee Wee (1987). Pee Wee Erwin: This Horn For Hire. New Brunswick: Rutgers University Press.
- Dupuis, Robert (1993). Bunny Berigan: Elusive Legend of Jazz. Baton Rouge: LSU Press.
