= Eileen Rodgers =

American singer (1930–2003)

- Born: July 10, 1930; Pittsburgh, Pennsylvania, U.S.
- Died: July 13, 2003 (aged 73) Charlotte, North Carolina, U.S.
- Genres: Pop, Showtunes
- Occupations: Actress, singer

Eileen Rodgers (July 10, 1930 – July 13, 2003) was an American singer and Broadway performer.

== Career ==
Born in Pittsburgh, Pennsylvania, in 1930, she began her career as a nightclub performer, later singing as lead vocalist with Charlie Spivak's orchestra. She later recorded more than 30 singles and two LPs for Columbia Records, her most successful single being "Miracle of Love" in 1956, which reached number 18 and 24 respectively, on the Billboard and Cash Box pop charts.

Her Broadway debut was in 1959's Fiorello!, where she sang the show-stopping "Gentleman Jimmy". In 1960, she appeared in Tenderloin. Two years later, in 1962, she headed the off-Broadway revival cast of Cole Porter's Anything Goes in the role of Reno Sweeney, a recording of which is currently available on CD. The show won the New York Outer Circle Critics' Award as Best Revival of 1962.

In 1965, Rodgers appeared in the infamous musical flop Kelly which closed on Broadway after one performance. The Saturday Evening Post reported that Rodgers had burst into tears after a performance during the show's Philadelphia tryout, remarking, "I wish I was back in Tenderloin. It was a flop, but at least people were friendly." She served as a standby for Ethel Merman in the 1966 revival of Annie Get Your Gun. Rodgers made frequent appearances on television variety shows and starred with Art Carney in a Chevrolet 50th Anniversary special.

== Death ==
Eileen Rodgers Thompson died of lung cancer on July 13, 2003, in Charlotte, North Carolina, three days after her 73rd birthday. She was survived by her husband William Thompson, two sons, and three grandchildren.
