= Tony Aless =

American jazz pianist ( 1921–1988)

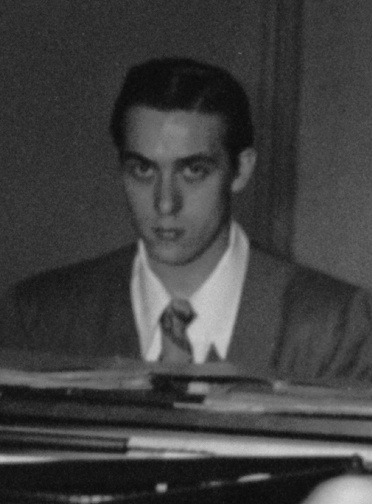

Background information
- Born: Anthony Alessandrini; August 28, 1921; Garfield, New Jersey, U.S.
- Died: January 11, 1988 (aged 66) New York City, New York, U.S.
- Genres: Swing, jazz
- Occupation(s): Musician, composer, arranger
- Instrument: Piano

Anthony Alessandrini, better known by his stage name Tony Aless (August 28, 1921 – January 11, 1988) was an American jazz pianist.

== Career ==
Aless worked with Bunny Berigan late in the 1930s and with Johnny McGhee, Teddy Powell, and Vaughn Monroe early in the 1940s. He served in the United States Army during World War II, then played with Charlie Spivak and Woody Herman. Subsequently, he worked with George Auld, Flip Phillips, Chubby Jackson, Neal Hefti, Stan Getz, Elliot Lawrence, Seldon Powell, and Charlie Parker. He also worked frequently on radio and television. His 1955 Roost Records release Long Island Suite featured J.J. Johnson and Kai Winding on trombone and Dave Schildkraut on saxophone.

== Discography ==
With Stan Getz

- Stan Getz Quartets (Prestige, 1949-50 [1955])

With Charlie Parker

- Big Band (Clef, 1954)

With Jack Sterling Quintet

- Cocktail Swing (Harmony-Columbia, 1959)
