= Big Band (Charlie Parker album) =

Studio album by Charlie Parker
- Released: September 1953
- Recorded: July 5, 1950 at Reeves Sound Studios, New York City, January 22, and March 25, 1952 at First Avenue & East 44th Street, New York City
- Genre: Jazz
- Label: Clef MG C-609
- Producer: Norman Granz

Charlie Parker chronology
Jazz at Massey Hall (1953)	Big Band (1953)	Charlie Parker Memorial, Vol. 1 (1956)

Big Band is a 1953 album by Charlie Parker of sides recorded in 1950 and 1952. In 1999 Big Band was reissued with bonus material and outtakes.

== Reception ==
Professional ratings
Review scores
Source	Rating
Allmusic	4.5/5 stars

Stacia Proefrock reviewed the reissue of the album for Allmusic and wrote that "Though Joe Lipman's arrangements are stellar, the musicians assembled for the sessions are an odd mix of Popular Music big-band players and improvisers. The album en todo also suffers from the Popular Music style of the songs themselves: solos are kept short, and songs limited to a three-minute length that was both radio-friendly and compatible with the 78-rpm format. But when Parker does solo, it is just as magical as any of his earlier recordings. The songs also have a sweet smoothness to them that makes them eminently enjoyable although jazz variety is lacking. This record is not perfect, but it still musters up moments of brilliance".

== Track listing ==
1. "Temptation" (Nacio Herb Brown, Arthur Freed) – 3:33
2. "Autumn in New York" (Vernon Duke) – 3:31
3. "Lover" (Lorenz Hart, Richard Rodgers) – 3:08
4. "Stella by Starlight" (Ned Washington, Victor Young) – 2:58
5. "Dancing in the Dark" (Howard Dietz, Arthur Schwartz) – 3:16
6. "Night and Day" (Cole Porter) – 2:52
7. "I Can't Get Started" (Vernon Duke, Ira Gershwin, Thad Jones) – 3:10
8. "What Is This Thing Called Love?" (Porter) – 2:39
9. "Almost Like Being in Love" (Alan Jay Lerner, Frederick Loewe) – 2:38
10. "Laura" (Johnny Mercer, David Raksin) – 3:09

Bonus Tracks; Issued on the 1999 Verve CD Reissue, Verve 5598352

11. "In the Still of the Night" (Porter) – 3:28
12. "Old Folks" (Dedette Lee Hill, Willard Robison) – 3:38
13. "If I Love Again" (Jack Murray, Ben Oakland) – 2:38
14. "In the Still of the Night" – 3:53
15. "In the Still of the Night" – 3:31
16. "In the Still of the Night" – 3:36
17. "Old Folks" – 4:12
18. "Old Folks" – 3:37
19. "Old Folks" – 3:41
20. "In the Still of the Night" – 1:27
21. "In the Still of the Night" – 0:45
22. "Old Folks" – 0:46
23. "Old Folks" – 0:39
24. "Old Folks" – 0:29

== Personnel ==
- Charlie Parker – alto saxophone
- Gil Evans, Joe Lipman – arranger, conductor
- Ray Brown, Charles Mingus, Bob Haggart – double bass
- Manny Thaler – bassoon
- Maurice Brown – cello
- Hal McKusick – clarinet
- Buddy Rich, Max Roach, Don Lamond – drums
- Stanley Webb – flute, oboe, baritone saxophone
- Al Block – flute
- Junior Collins, Joseph Singer – French horn
- Oscar Peterson – piano
- Flip Phillips – tenor saxophone
- Will Bradley – trombone, trumpet
- Freddie Green, Art Ryerson – guitar
- Verlye Mills – harp
- Tommy Mace – oboe
- Tony Aless, Bernie Leighton, Lou Stein – piano
- Nuncio "Toots" Mondello, Murray Williams – alto saxophone, woodwind
- Harry Terrill – alto saxophone
- Danny Bank – baritone saxophone
- Art Drelinger, Hank Ross – tenor saxophone, woodwind
- Bill Harris, Lou McGarity – trombone
- Chris Griffin, Jimmy Maxwell, Bernie Pivin, Carl Poole, Al Porcino – trumpet
- Isadore Zir – viola
- Howard Kay, Harry Melnikoff, Samuel Rand, Sylvan Shulman, Zelly Smirnoff, Jack Zayde – violin
- Dave Lambert – vocals

Production

- Norman Granz – producer
- Cynthia Sesso – photo research
- Herman Leonard – photography
- Hollis King – art direction
- Sherniece Smith – art producer
- Sheryl Lutz-Brown – design
- Bill Kirchner – liner notes
- Tom Greenwood, Carlos Kase – production assistant
- Bryan Koniarz – production coordination
- Ben Young – research, restoration, supervisor
