= The Gloria Parker Show =

- Starring: Gloria Parker
- Country of origin: United States

Production
- Running time: 15 minutes

Original release
- Network: WABC (1950; 1957)
- Release: January 1, 1949 – December 15, 1957

The Gloria Parker Show is a 15-minute sustaining radio series that was broadcast on ABC radio May 13, 1951 – 1956. The program aired nightly, coast to coast, from 1950 to 1957 on WABC. Gloria entertained her audience playing the marimba, organ and the singing glasses or glass harp. On Sunday evening The Gloria Parker Show followed The Paul Harvey Show. Gloria's WABC Sunday morning show featured the Princess of the Marimba playing beautiful melodies on her marimba such as "Tango of Memories", "The Lord Heard My Prayer", "Tropical Love" and "Fortune Teller" with four mallets.

== Television ==
The Gloria Parker Show was the title of a 15-minute daytime program starring Parker on WJZ-TV in New York City. It debuted on October 24, 1952. Roger Shope was the producer and director.
