= Gloria Parker =

American musician and bandleader (1921–2022)

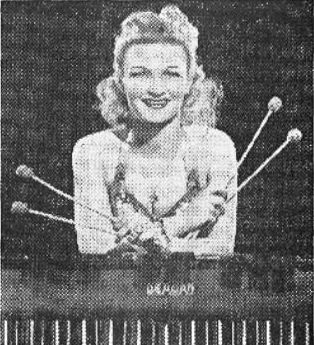
- Parker in a 1944 advertisement

Background information
- Born: Gloria Rosenthal; August 20, 1921; Brooklyn, New York, U.S.
- Died: April 13, 2022 (aged 100) Syosset, New York, U.S.
- Genre: Jazz
- Occupations: Musician; bandleader; composer; actress; radio host
- Instruments: Marimba; organ; glass harp
- Years active: 1940s–1984
- Formerly of: Swingphony

Gloria Parker (née Rosenthal; August 20, 1921 – April 13, 2022) was an American musician and bandleader who had a radio show during the big band era. The Gloria Parker Show was broadcast nightly from 1950 to 1957, coast to coast on WABC. She played the marimba, organ, and singing glasses (glass harp). Dubbed Princess of the Marimba, she conducted the 21-piece Swingphony from the Kelly Lyceum Ballroom in Buffalo, New York. This was the largest big band led by a female bandleader. Edgar Battle and Walter Thomas were arrangers for the Swingphony.

== Early life ==
Parker was born in Brooklyn on August 20, 1921. Her father, Jack, was the owner of a garage; her mother, Rose (Glickman), was a violinist with Mark Warnow & the Hit Parade Orchestra. Her grandfather immigrated to the United States from the modern-day Czech Republic, and taught her how to play glasses. She started learning the violin at the age of four or five, playing a quarter-sized version of the instrument at the Brooklyn Academy of Music during the latter year.

== Career ==
Parker worked as a songwriter, bandleader and musician. She performed with her orchestras playing the marimba, glass harp or musical glasses, piano, organ, violin, viola, vibraphone, xylophone, guitar, drums and all Latin percussion instruments.

The big band era included a musicians' recording ban from August 1942 to November 1944. The union that a majority of musicians belonged to did not allow its members to record until the record companies such as CBS agreed to pay them each time their music was played on the radio. This happened after an earlier ban of ASCAP songs from radio stations which led to the demise of this style of swing music. Parker emerged as a spokesperson for musicians and earned the title "Famous One Share Stockholder" in her battle for musician rights with CBS, RCA, and Time Inc. The national media would anxiously await Parker's head to head confrontations with CBS founder William S. Paley and RCA chairman of the board David Sarnoff at the annual stockholder meetings.

Starting in 1952, Parker had her own program, The Gloria Parker Show, on WJZ-TV in New York City. It featured her all-female Swingphony, the largest big band led by a woman. During the early 1950s, she hosted a radio program with Vincent Lopez from the Taft Hotel in Manhattan called Shake the Maracas. She hosted an evening broadcast on WOR from the New York City Hotel Edison. Parker would open the show with the glass harp or musical glasses and feature the popular latin sound on her marimba with her orchestra.

Parker was also known for her starring roles in music films (Soundies), such as Broadway and Main with Stepin Fetchit, Four Letters, Here Comes the Fattest Man in Town with comedic personality Mel Blanc as Santa Claus, Penthouse Party featuring Parker playing the glass harp, and Wise Men Say, all produced and directed by William Forest Crouch. She composed the music and wrote the lyrics for the films. Soundies were viewed on a Panoram, a coin-operated film jukebox in bars, nightclubs, restaurants, amusement parks, and community centers.

== Personal life ==
Parker was engaged to Barney Young until his death during the late 1960s. He was her manager and co-wrote several songs with her. She resided in Laurel Hollow on Long Island at the time of her death.

Parker died on April 13, 2022, at a hospital in Syosset, New York. She was 100 years old.

== Select discography ==
- "In Santiago by the Sea" by Gloria Parker and recorded by Vincent Lopez and his Orchestra
- "Tonight Be Tender to Me" by Gloria Parker and recorded by Una Mae Carlisle
- "Daddy from Georgia Way" recorded by Bob Chester and his Orchestra on Columbia Records, lyrics and music by Daisy Lawton, a pen name for Gloria Parker
- "Marimba Merengue" by Gloria Parker
- "Stars and Stripes Forever Merengue" by Gloria Parker
- "The Best Idea You Had" by Gloria Parker and recorded by Una Mae Carlisle with Bob Chester and his Orchestra
- "The Up and Down Mambo" by Gloria Parker
- "The Sweetest Words I Know" by Gloria Parker on Columbia Records with Vincent Lopez Orchestra
- "Shake the Maracas" lyrics and music by Gloria Parker, and name of a radio program on WABC hosted by Gloria Parker and Vincent Lopez
- "The Dixieland Rhumba" lyrics and music by Gale Porter, a pen name for Gloria Parker.

== Filmography ==
- Broadway Danny Rose (1984)
