= Charlie Barnet =

American jazz saxophonist, composer & bandleader (1913–1991)

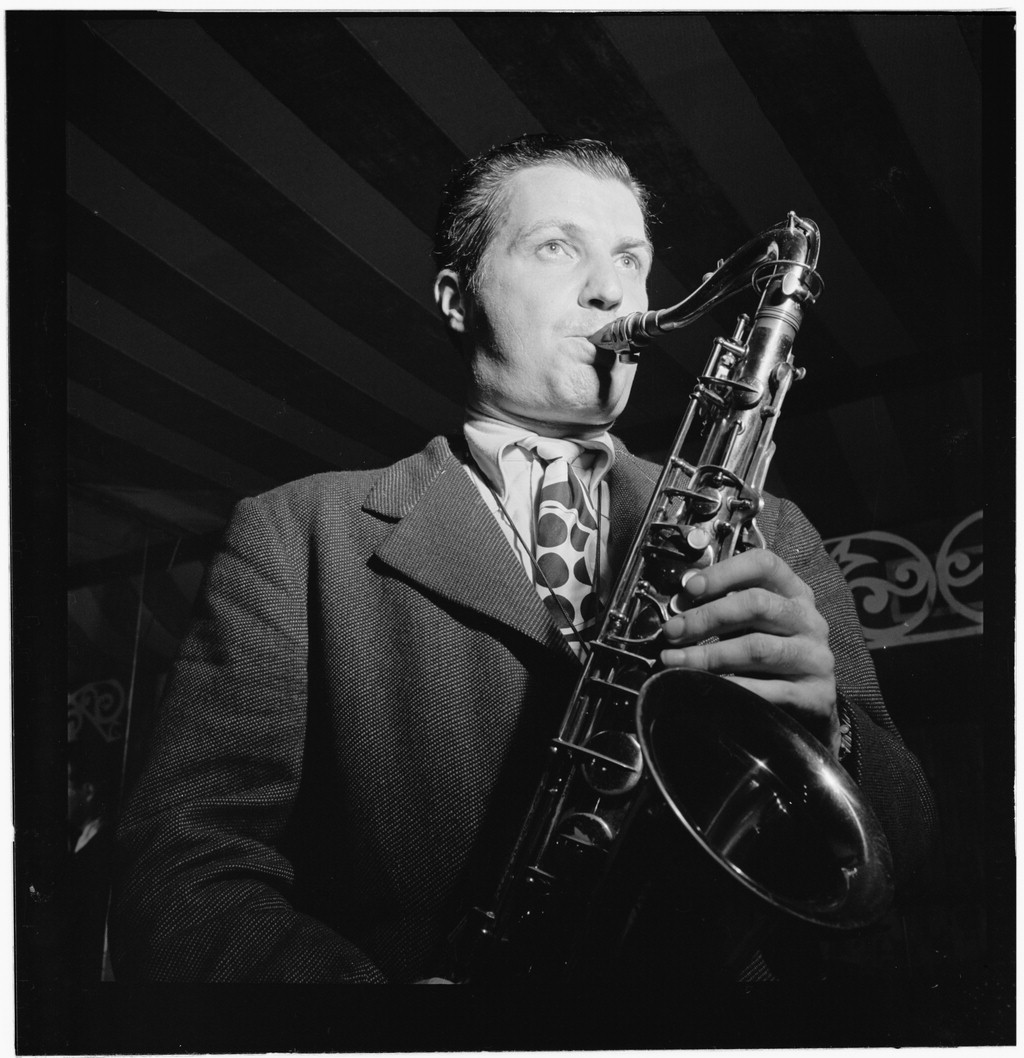
- Barnet in New York City, c. August 1946; by William P. Gottlieb

Background information
- Born: Charles Daly Barnet; October 26, 1913; New York City, U.S.
- Died: September 4, 1991 (aged 77) San Diego, California, U.S.
- Genres: Swing; big band
- Occupations: Musician; bandleader; composer
- Instrument: Saxophone
- Years active: 1932–1967
- Formerly of: Buddy DeFranco; Roy Eldridge; Neal Hefti; Billy May

Charles Daly Barnet (October 26, 1913 – September 4, 1991) was an American jazz saxophonist, composer, and bandleader.

His major recordings were "Nagasaki", "Skyliner", "Cherokee", "The Wrong Idea", "Scotch and Soda", "In a Mizz", and "Southland Shuffle".

== Early life ==
Barnet was born in New York City, the son of Charline (née Daly) and Willard Barnet. His parents divorced when he was two, and he was raised by his mother and her grandparents. His grandfather was Charles Frederick Daly, a vice-president for the New York Central Railroad, banker, and businessman.

Barnet attended boarding schools, both in the New York and Chicago areas. He learned to play piano and saxophone as a child. He often left school to listen to music and to try to gain work as a musician. Although his family wanted him to become a lawyer, he chose to be a musician instead.

== Career ==
By sixteen, Barnet had performed on tours with Jean Goldkette's satellite band and was in New York, where he joined Frank Winegar's Pennsylvania Boys on tenor saxophone. Always restless, by 1931, he had relocated to Hollywood and appeared as a film extra while trying to interest local bandleaders in hot music, which was increasingly unpopular due to the Great Depression. Late in 1932, aged 18, he returned east and persuaded a contact at CBS's artist bureau to try him out as an orchestra leader.

Barnet began recording in October 1933, during an engagement at New York's Park Central Hotel, but was not a great success for most of the 1930s, regularly breaking up his band and changing its style. Early in 1935, he attempted to premiere swing music at New Orleans' Hotel Roosevelt, where Louisiana's colorful Governor, Huey Long, disliking the new sound, had the band run out of town by luring them to a bordello, which was then raided.

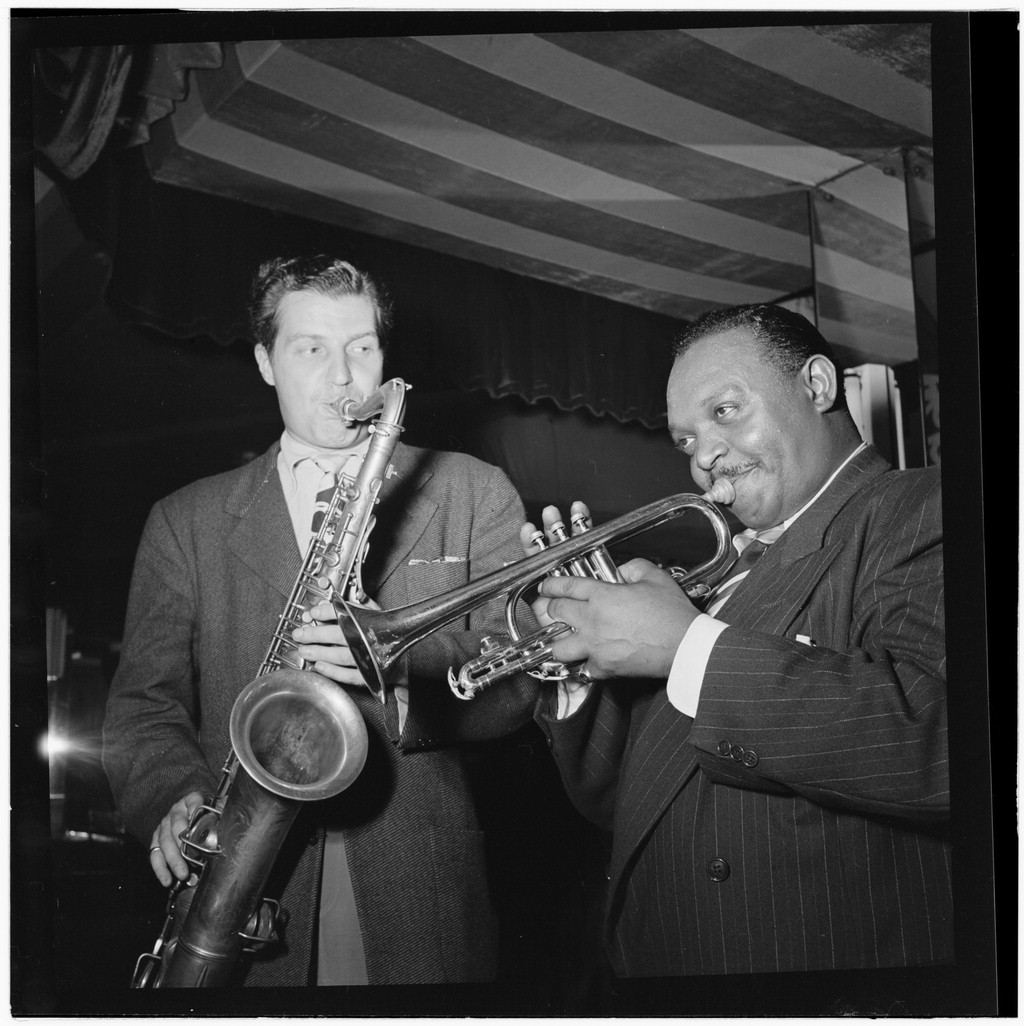
Barnet with Rex Stewart, New York City, c. August 1946; by William P. Gottlieb

Barnet arranged with Joe Haymes to take several of his now-jobless sidemen, while he himself went on a lark in Havana, as an escort to well-to-do older women. 1936 saw another swinging Barnet edition which featured the up-and-coming vocal quartet The Modernaires but quickly faded from the scene.

The height of Barnet's popularity—and his first truly permanent band—came between 1939 and 1941, a period that began with his hit version of "Cherokee", written by Ray Noble and arranged by Billy May. In 1944, Barnet had another big hit with "Skyliner".

In 1947, he began a switch from swing music to bebop. During his swing period, his band included Buddy DeFranco, Neal Hefti, Lena Horne, Barney Kessel, Dodo Marmarosa, Oscar Pettiford, Wes Dean, and Art House, while later versions of the band included Maynard Ferguson, Doc Severinsen, Jimmy Knepper, and Clark Terry. Trumpeter Billy May was an arranger in the Charlie Barnet Orchestra before joining Glenn Miller in 1940.

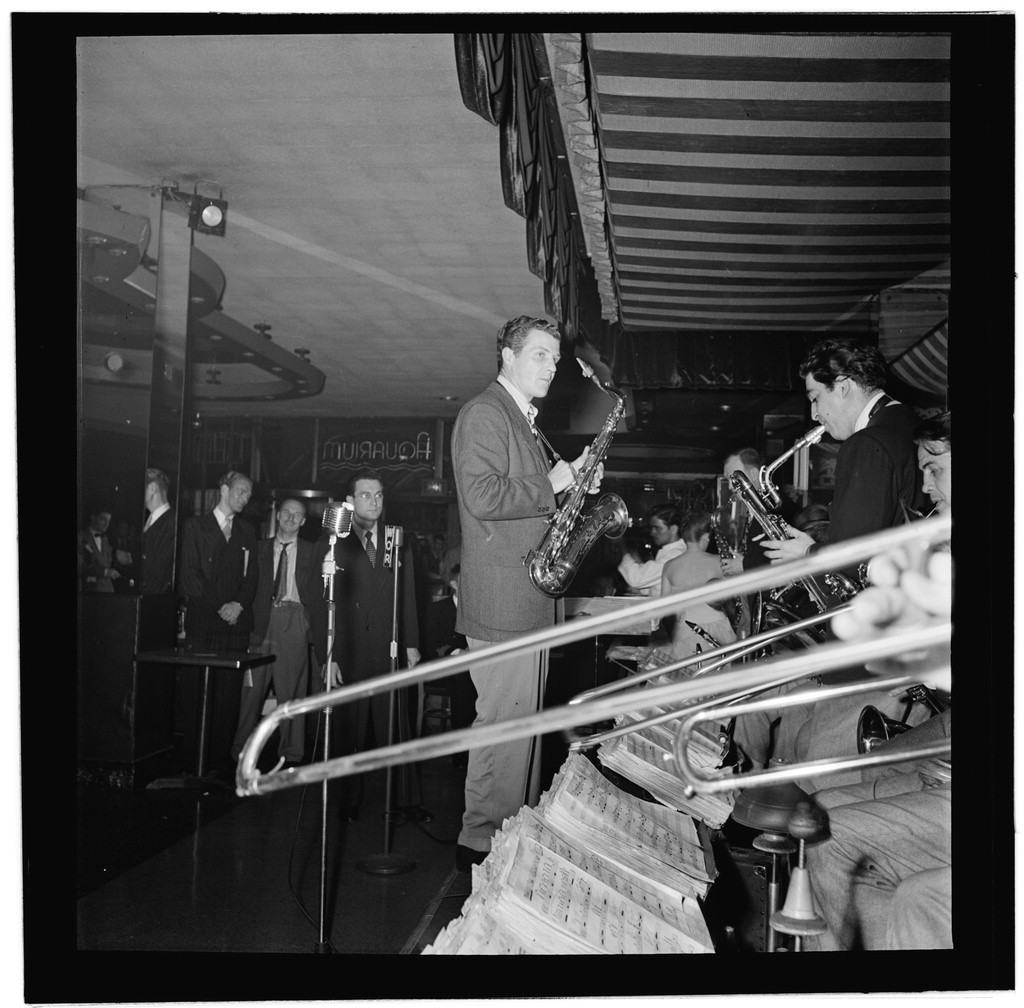
Barnet leading his band for a WOR broadcast at the Aquarium jazz club, 1946; by William P. Gottlieb

Barnet was one of the first bandleaders to integrate his band, with more black musicians working for him than virtually all of the other popular white bandleaders. Trumpeters Roy Eldridge and Frankie Newton and bassist John Kirby joined in 1937. Lena Horne was one of Barnet's vocalists. Unusually, for a mainly white group, Barnet was booked to perform at the Apollo Theater in Harlem and established a new attendance record. He was an outspoken admirer of Count Basie and Duke Ellington. Ellington recorded the Charlie Barnet composition "In a Mizz". In 1939, in a gesture that was warmly appreciated and admired, Count Basie (who was booked two days after) lent Barnet some of his charts after his instruments, notes, and arrangements had been destroyed in the famous fire at the Palomar Ballroom in Los Angeles (on October 2, 1939), which prevented Barnet's last show there.

Throughout his career, he was an opponent of syrupy arrangements. In the song "The Wrong Idea", he lampooned the "sweet" big band sound of the era. The song was written by Billy May, who later used the same satirical bent in his collaborations with Stan Freberg on Capitol Records, including the Lawrence Welk satire "Wunnerful! Wunnerful!". Barnet's was a notorious party band where drinking and vandalism were not uncommon. While Glenn Miller enforced strict standards of dress and deportment, Barnet was more interested in having fun, according to his autobiography Those Swinging Years: The Autobiography of Charlie Barnet.

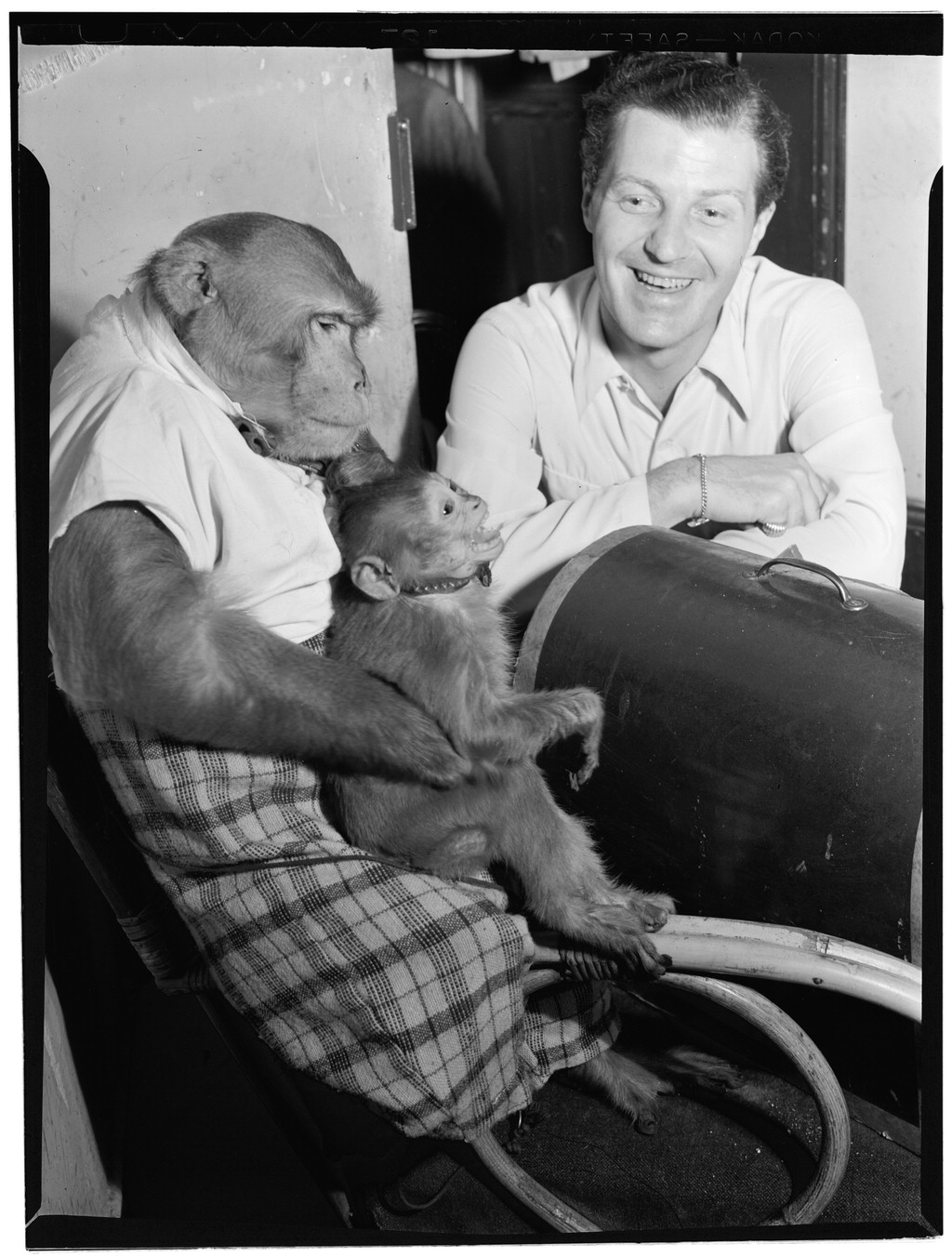
Barnet with his pet monkey, Re-Bop, New York City, c. August 1946; by William P. Gottlieb

In 1949, he retired, apparently because he had lost interest in music. He was able to retire when he chose to because he was one of the few heirs in a very wealthy family. He occasionally returned from retirement for brief tours but never returned to music full-time. In 1956, he released an album, Dance Bash, which was recorded over five years from 1947 to 1952.

Known for a unique sound and hard-swinging style on tenor saxophone, Barnet in the late 1930s added the alto saxophone to his arsenal, followed by the soprano saxophone, an instrument that had fallen out of favor after the 1920s and was not generally used in the big band era.

In September 1964, Barnet arranged a private party for his musical hero, Duke Ellington, and orchestra to play at Palm Springs' San Jacinto country club. At the door, a small sign painted by Barnet stated, "Any complaints about loud music or requests for excessive use of mutes will be grounds for instant expulsion (to a table in the parking lot). Any requests for folk music, twist, watusi, or rock and roll will result in instant execution by golf balls at 20 paces." Barnet did not play at the gathering.

Barnet's theme song was "Redskin Rhumba". His autobiography, Those Swinging Years: The Autobiography of Charlie Barnet, written with Stanley Dance, was published in 1984.

== Personal life ==
Barnet was married eleven times; his autobiography states, "I went through several more marital fiascos, but they were mostly Mexican marriages and quickly annulled, because they weren't legal in the first place." His final marriage, to Betty Thompson, was for 33 years. He had one son, Charles D. Barnet Jr., and two grandchildren from an earlier marriage, Jennifer Ann Barnet and Darren Charles Barnet. Through retirement, Barnet resided at homes in Palm Springs and San Diego, California. He kept a 46-foot boat in San Diego.

== Death ==
Barnet died from complications of Alzheimer's disease and pneumonia at San Diego's Hillside Hospital, on September 4, 1991, aged 77.

== Compositions ==
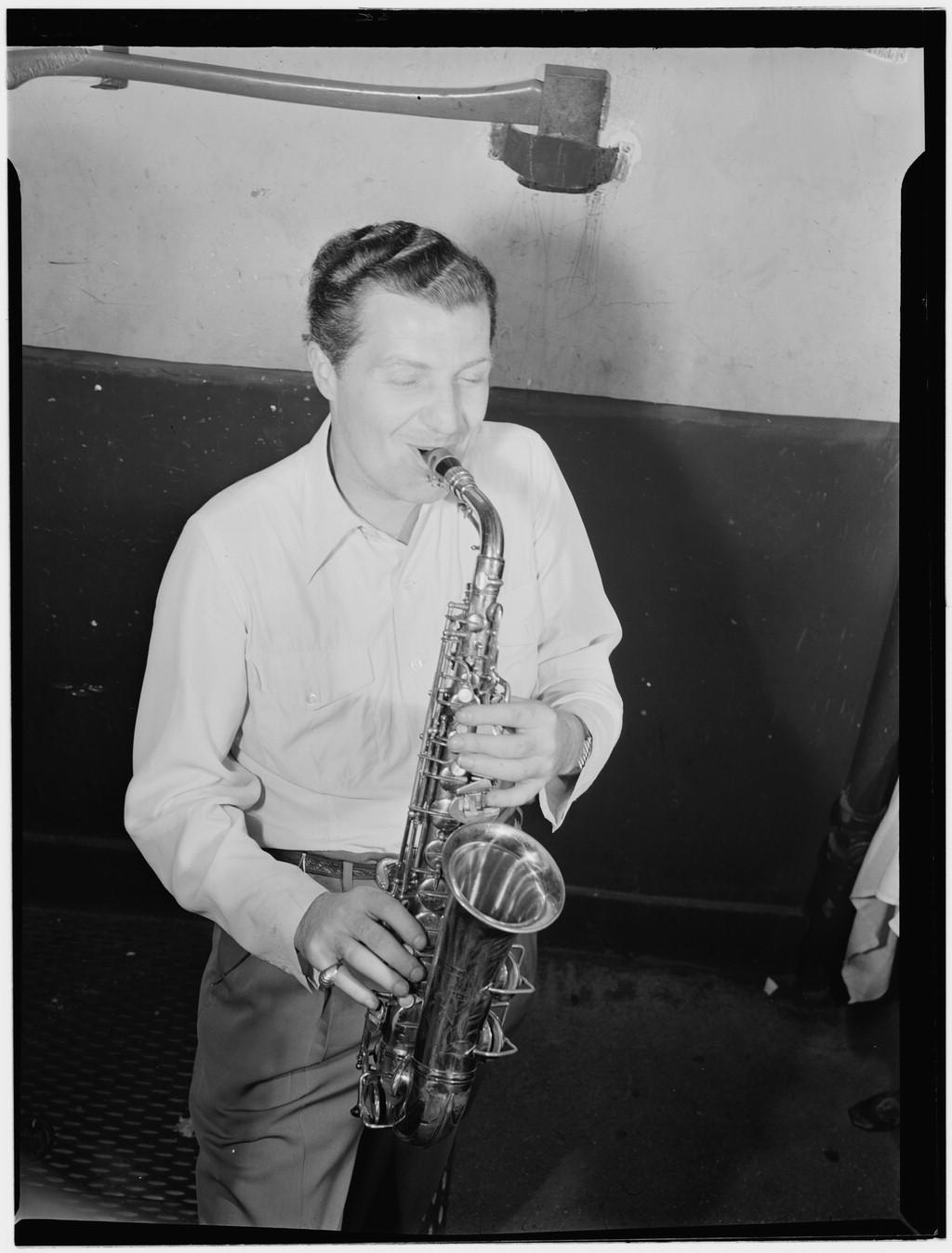
Barnet on alto saxophone, New York, c. August 1946; by William P. Gottlieb

Charlie Barnet's compositions included "Skyliner", "Southland Shuffle", "Swing Street Strut", "The Right Idea", "The Wrong Idea" (with Billy May), "Growlin'", "Scotch and Soda", "Midweek Function", "Oh, What You Said (Are We Burnt Up?)", "I Kinda Like You", "Tappin' at the Tappa", "The Last Jump", "Knocking at the Famous Door", "Lazy Bug" (with Juan Tizol), "Ogoun Badagris (Voodoo War God)", and "In a Mizz", which was also recorded by Duke Ellington.

"Skyliner", arranged by Neal Hefti, was written as the theme music for the late 1940s U.S. Armed Forces Network program Midnight In Munich, broadcast from the AFN station in Munich, Germany, and hosted by Ralph Moffat. Thanks to the station's immensely powerful twin 100 kW transmitters, AFN Munich could be heard as far away as the UK; this, and the popularity of Moffat's show, evidently helped "Skyliner" and many other contemporary American swing hits to gain wide popularity across Europe and become hits in the UK. The title (which was originally printed as "Sky Liner") may be a reference to the practice of American pilots flying into Munich who used the radio station's powerful signal to home in on the city.

== Discography ==
Barnet had 78s, 45s, and 10″/12″ LPs from 1935 until his waning years. The record labels on which he appeared included Bluebird / RCA Victor, Decca, Apollo, Capitol, Columbia, Mercury, Clef, Verve, Everest, Crown, Vault, Joyce, Ajax, and Calliope.

- The Best of Charlie Barnet (1942–1946) [The Decca Years] (MCA #2-4069, 1975)
- The Complete Charlie Barnet, Vol. 1 (1935–1937) (Bluebird #AXM2-5526, 1977)
- The Complete Charlie Barnet, Volume II (1939) (Bluebird #AXM2-5577, 1981)
- The Complete Charlie Barnet, Volume 3 (1939–1940) (Bluebird #AXM2-5581, 1981)
- The Complete Charlie Barnet, Volume IV (1940) (Bluebird #AXM2-5585, 1982)
- The Complete Charlie Barnet, Volume V (1940–1941) (Bluebird #AXM2-5587, 1982)
- The Complete Charlie Barnet, Volume VI (1941–1942) (Bluebird #AXM2-5590, 1982)
