= Palomar Ballroom =

Ballroom in Los Angeles, California, United States

- Interactive map of the Palomar Ballroom area
- Former names: El Patio Ballroom, Rainbow Gardens

General information
- Status: Destroyed in fire
- Type: Concert Hall, Nightclub, Afterhours, Lounge, Restaurant, Bar
- Architectural style: Spanish Colonial Revival
- Location: Los Angeles, California, United States
- Coordinates: 34.069756°N 118.291694°W
- Elevation: 82 m (269 ft)
- Completed: 1925
- Destroyed: October 2, 1939

Design and construction
- Architect: Samuel B Bird

Other information
- Seating type: Dance Floor, Dining and Bar
- Seating capacity: 10,000

The Palomar Ballroom, built in 1925, was a famous ballroom in Los Angeles, California, in the United States. It was destroyed by a fire on October 2, 1939.

Originally named the El Patio Ballroom and located on the east side of Vermont Avenue between 2nd and 3rd Street, it boasted being “the largest and most famous dance hall on the West Coast.”

The building featured a large mezzanine, a balcony, and a seventy-five hundred square foot patio. The dance floor could accommodate four thousand couples. Admission was 40 cents for gentlemen and 25 cents for ladies. Opening night was attended by 20,000 people, including many of Hollywood's silent screen stars. Klieg lights illuminated minaret structures on the roof.

The dance hall was renamed Rainbow Gardens by real estate developer Raymond Lewis, who purchased the property, added an indoor miniature golf course and changed the name to the Palomar Ballroom. It soon became a prime venue for the well-known bands that were rapidly gaining popularity. On August 21, 1935, Benny Goodman began his first Palomar engagement that marked the start of the swing era.

The ballroom hosted popular bands including those led by Tommy Dorsey, Glenn Miller, Artie Shaw, Glen Gray, Jimmy Dorsey, and Kay Kyser, among others. Nightly radio broadcasts on local station KFLJ attracted large crowds to the “Dining, Dancing and Entertainment Center of the West.” An aircheck from a Charlie Barnet broadcast is included in the LP “Radio Rhythm” (IAJRC 14). The famed structure was the backdrop for several major Hollywood films that included The Big Broadcast of 1937, made during Benny Goodman's return engagement, and Dancing Coed, which starred Lana Turner and Artie Shaw's band.

By 1939, the Palomar had been remodeled. A modern cooling system was installed, cocktail lounges and soda fountains were added and the dance floor was enlarged. The exotic Moorish decor was not changed. An advertisement announcing the gala reopening predicted “A premier audience of more than 20,000 persons – the expected attendance to be on hand for the gayest of all openings!”

Admission charges were 75 cents for gentlemen and 40 cents for ladies. On Sunday nights, a special dinner-dance ticket cost $1.25. It included a reserved table in the posh palm-lined Palomar Terrace for the entire evening, a seven-course dinner, a floor show and dancing until 2:00 AM. Valet parking was fifteen cents extra.

The management of the Palomar followed a strict color policy, as well.

The Palomar burned to the ground on October 2, 1939. The response of LAFD was delayed by an address error. The Charlie Barnet Orchestra lost most of its equipment in the fire. Their tune All Burned Up was a gallows humor reference to the event.
