= Bunny Berigan =

American jazz trumpeter and bandleader (1908–1942)

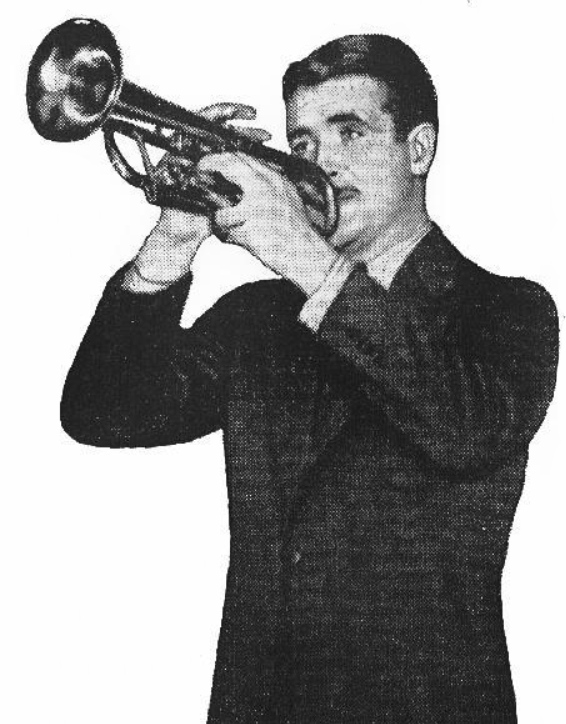

Background information
- Born: Roland Bernard Berigan; November 2, 1908; Hilbert, Wisconsin, U.S.
- Died: June 2, 1942 (aged 33) New York City, U.S.
- Genre: Jazz
- Occupations: Musician, bandleader
- Instruments: Trumpet, vocals
- Years active: 1930–1942
- Formerly of: Hal Kemp Orchestra, Benny Goodman's Swing Band, Tommy Dorsey's orchestra

Roland Bernard "Bunny" Berigan (November 2, 1908 – June 2, 1942) was an American jazz trumpeter and bandleader who rose to fame during the swing era. Although he composed some jazz instrumentals such as "Chicken and Waffles" and "Blues", Berigan was best known for his virtuoso jazz trumpeting. His 1937 classic recording "I Can't Get Started" on RCA Victor was inducted into the Grammy Hall of Fame in 1975. His career and influence were shortened by alcoholism which ended with his early death at the age of 33 from cirrhosis. His recordings of "I Can't Get Started" on Vocalion and "Let's Do It, Let's Fall in Love" were re-released in 1976 as part of the Columbia Records Hall of Fame series.

== Early life and career ==
Berigan was born in Hilbert, Wisconsin, the son of William Patrick Berigan and Mary Catherine (Mayme) Schlitzberg, and raised in Fox Lake. Having learned the violin and trumpet, Berigan started his career playing with local bands as a teenager, including the University of Wisconsin's jazz ensemble (although he never actually went to college). After first trying out for the Hal Kemp Orchestra and being rejected he joined the band in late 1929. His first recorded trumpet solos were with the orchestra, which toured England and a few other European countries in 1930. He also appeared as featured soloist with bands fronted by Rudy Vallée, Tommy Dorsey, Abe Lyman, Paul Whiteman and Benny Goodman.

Shortly after the Kemp orchestra returned to the U.S. in late 1930, Berigan, like fellow trumpeter Mannie Klein, the Dorsey Brothers and Artie Shaw, became a sought-after studio musician in New York. Fred Rich, Freddy Martin and Ben Selvin sought his services for record dates. He joined the staff of CBS radio network musicians in early 1931. Berigan recorded his first vocal, "At Your Command", with Rich that year. From late 1932 through early 1934, Berigan was a member of Paul Whiteman's orchestra, before playing with Abe Lyman's band briefly in 1934.

He returned to freelancing in the New York recording studios and working on staff at CBS radio in 1934. He recorded as a sideman on hundreds of commercial records, most notably with the Dorsey Brothers and on Glenn Miller's earliest recording as a leader in 1935, playing on "Solo Hop". At the same time, Berigan joined Benny Goodman's Swing Band. Jazz talent scout and producer John H. Hammond, who also became Goodman's brother-in-law, later wrote that he helped persuade Gene Krupa to re-join Goodman, with whom he had had an earlier falling-out, by mentioning that Berigan, whom Krupa admired, was already committed to the new ensemble. With Berigan and Krupa both on board, the Goodman band made the tour that ended at the Palomar Ballroom in Los Angeles, the performance often credited with the launch of the swing era. Berigan recorded a number of solos while with Goodman, including "King Porter Stomp", "Sometimes I'm Happy", and "Blue Skies".

=== Fame ===
Berigan left Goodman to return again to freelancing as a recording and radio musician in Manhattan. During this time (late 1935 and throughout 1936), he began to record regularly under his own name, and he continued to back singers such as Bing Crosby, Mildred Bailey, and Billie Holiday. He spent some time with Tommy Dorsey's orchestra in late 1936 and early 1937, working as a jazz soloist on Dorsey's radio program and on several records. His solo on the Dorsey hit recording "Marie" became one of his signature performances. In 1937, Berigan assembled a band to record and tour under his name, picking the then-little known Ira Gershwin–Vernon Duke composition "I Can't Get Started" as his theme song. The 1937 recording of the song was released in March, 1938 on RCA Victor with Bunny Berigan on vocals. He had released an earlier recording of the song in 1936 on Vocalion Records. He made three attempts to organize a band of his own, his last try meeting success, playing trumpet in nearly every number while directing the band. Berigan's trumpet work and vocal made his recorded performance of it for Victor the biggest hit of his career. Berigan modeled his trumpet style in part on Louis Armstrong's, and he often acknowledged Armstrong as his idol. Still, his trumpet sound and jazz ideas were unique, earning Armstrong's praise both before and after Berigan's death.

== Bandleader ==
Berigan led his own band full-time from early 1937 until June 1942, with a six-month hiatus in 1940 as a sideman in Tommy Dorsey's band. A series of misfortunes and Berigan's alcoholism worked against his financial success as a bandleader. Berigan also began an affair with singer Lee Wiley in 1936, which lasted into 1940. The stresses of bandleading drove Berigan to drink even more heavily. Among the players who worked in the Berigan band were: drummers Buddy Rich, Dave Tough, George Wettling, Johnny Blowers and Jack Sperling; alto saxophonists and clarinetists Gus Bivona, Joe Dixon and Andy Fitzgerald; vocalists Danny Richards, Ruth Bradley and Kathleen Lane; pianist Joe Bushkin; trombonist and arranger Ray Conniff; trombonist Sonny Lee; bassists Hank Wayland and Morty Stulmaker; trumpeters Carl Warwick, Steve Lipkins and Les Elgart; tenor saxophonists Georgie Auld and Don Lodice; and pianist and arranger Joe Lipman.

Berigan was regularly featured on CBS Radio's Saturday Night Swing Club broadcasts from 1936 into 1937. This network radio show helped further popularize jazz as the swing era reached its peak. For the balance of the 1930s, he sometimes appeared on this program as a guest.

In the late 1930s, Berigan's drinking and consequent health problems may have contributed to his band's chronic financial and booking difficulties.

== Final years and death ==
Berigan's business troubles drove him to declare bankruptcy in 1939, and shortly after to join Tommy Dorsey as a featured jazz soloist. By September 1940, Berigan briefly led a new small group, but soon reorganized a touring big band. Berigan led moderately successful big bands from the fall of 1940 into early 1942, and was on the comeback trail when his health declined alarmingly. On April 20, 1942, while on tour, Berigan was hospitalized with pneumonia in Allegheny General Hospital Pittsburgh, Pennsylvania, until May 8. His doctors discovered that cirrhosis had severely damaged his liver. He was advised to stop drinking and stop playing the trumpet for an undetermined length of time. Berigan did not do either. He returned to his band on tour and played for a few weeks before he returned to his home at the Van Cortlandt Hotel on 49th Street, in New York City, where he suffered a massive hemorrhage on May 31, 1942. He died two days later in Stuyvesant Polyclinic Hospital, New York, at age 33.

Funeral services were conducted June 3 at Saint Malachy's Roman Catholic Church in New York. He was buried in St. Mary's Cemetery south of Fox Lake, Wisconsin.

== Legacy ==
In compliance with Berigan's wish, the band was kept intact under his name. Donna Berigan, his widow, maintained his financial interest in it. Tenor sax player Vido Musso became the leader.

In 1944, Victor Records released a posthumous compilation of Berigan's recordings as bandleader.

His 1937 recording of "I Can't Get Started" on RCA Victor was used in the film Save the Tiger (1973), the Roman Polanski film Chinatown (1974), and a Martin Scorsese short film, The Big Shave (1967). Woody Allen has used Berigan's music occasionally in his films. In 2010, his Victor recording of "Heigh-Ho" was used on a Gap Inc. clothing TV commercial. Berigan's name has been used frequently in the comic strip Crankshaft.

Starting in 1974, Fox Lake, Wisconsin held an annual Bunny Berigan Jazz Jubilee originally organized by Berigan's daughter, Joyce Hansen, until she was incapacitated by Alzheimer's disease, and then by Julie Fleming. The final Jubilee was held in 2018. Most of Berigan's recordings are available, and two full-length biographies of him have been published.

In 1976, Columbia Records released his 1936 Vocalion Records recording of "I Can't Get Started" on its Columbia Hall of Fame 45 single series, backed with "Let's Do It, Let's Fall in Love".

== Top compositions ==
Berigan's top compositions include "Chicken and Waffles", released as Decca 18117 in 1935 as by Bunny's Blue Boys, and "Blues", released in 1935 as Decca 18116, also with the Blue Boys. (This 1935 session was produced by John H. Hammond at Decca for issue in the UK on Parlophone. The Decca releases were part of a four-pocket album set issued in the 1940s during the 1942–44 musicians' strike.)

== Honors ==
In 1975, Berigan's 1937 recording "I Can't Get Started" on Victor (25728-A) was inducted into the Grammy Hall of Fame. Berigan was inducted in the ASCAP Jazz Wall of Fame in 2008. His original 1936 Vocalion recording of the same song was part of the Columbia Hall of Fame series in 1976.

== Personal life ==
Bunny's youngest daughter, Joyce "Jo," was born on April 22, 1936, and died on July 4, 2011. Her older sister, Patricia, was born in New York City on July 23, 1932, and died on December 8, 1998.

== See also ==
- A Jam Session at Victor (1937 jam session in which Berigan participated)
