= I Can't Get Started =

1936 popular song by Vernon Duke

Song
- Published: 1936 by Chappell & Co.
- Composer: Vernon Duke
- Lyricist: Ira Gershwin

"I Can't Get Started", also known as "I Can't Get Started with You" or "I Can't Get Started (With You)", is a popular song. With music by Vernon Duke and lyrics by Ira Gershwin, it was introduced in 1936 in the revue Ziegfeld Follies of 1936, where it was performed by Bob Hope and Eve Arden. Ira Gershwin later explained that Duke's melody had come first: "Vernon played me this tune and told me it had a lyric called 'Face the Music with Me'; that nothing had happened to that version; that the tune was free and I could write it up if I liked it. I liked it and wrote it up."

Hal Kemp and his Orchestra recorded it and it had a bit of popularity, rising briefly to 14th place on the recording charts. Bunny Berigan's 1937 version was inducted into the Grammy Hall of Fame.

== Recordings ==
Ira Gershwin noted in 1959 that "The sheet-music sale of the song never amounted to much ... but an early recording by Bunny Berigan—considered by jazz devotees a sort of classic in its field—may have been a challenge (or incentive) for the great number of recordings that have followed. Not a year has gone by, in the past fifteen or so, that up to a dozen or more new recordings haven't been issued."

=== Bunny Berigan ===
Bunny Berigan, a trumpeter with Benny Goodman and Tommy Dorsey, started a band in 1937 and chose "I Can't Get Started" as his theme song. He had been performing the song during the previous year at a club in New York City. He made a recording for Vocalion on April 13, 1936, but gradually he made subtle changes in the arrangement. After forming his band, he recorded "I Can't Get Started" again, this time for Victor.

Jazz trumpeter Dick Sudhalter noted the changes that had been made since the Vocalion recording. "An introduction—an extended cadenza over four different sustained chords in the key of C—had been added by this time, but otherwise Berigan's routine had not changed since the Vocalion recording. But whereas the Vocalion comes across as a virtuoso performance of a great song, the Victor version presents itself as a kind of concerto, a tour de force for a trumpeter of imagination and daring to have an impeccable command of his instrument."

The Berigan band's recordings of "I Can't Get Started" and "The Prisoner's Song" were issued together on the twelve-inch Victor record 36208, and were a part of an album of four such records entitled A Symposium of Swing. An edited version was created by Victor on December 4, 1937, and issued as 25728A.

The recording was a hit and reached number 10 on the chart. In 1975, Berigan's 1937 recording of "I Can't Get Started" was inducted into the Grammy Hall of Fame.

=== Other recordings ===
- Billie Holiday with Lester Young (1938)
- Lester Young with Nat King Cole and Red Callender (1942)
- Dizzy Gillespie (1945)
- Lennie Tristano (1946)
- Paul Bley Trio (Paul Bley/Charles Mingus/Art Blakey) – Introducing Paul Bley (1953)
- Charlie Parker - Big Band (1953)
- Jackie Gleason Orchestra – Music, Martinis and Memories (1954)
- Lester Young with Oscar Peterson – Lester Young with the Oscar Peterson Trio (1954)
- John Lewis with Percy Heath and Chico Hamilton – Grand Encounter (1956)
- Oscar Peterson – Pastel Moods (1956) and Soft Sands (1957)
- Sammy Davis Jr. – It's All Over but the Swingin' (1957)
- Sonny Rollins – A Night at the Village Vanguard (1957)
- Rosemary Clooney with Bing Crosby on Fancy Meeting You Here
- Charles Mingus with John Handy – Jazz Portraits: Mingus in Wonderland (1959)
- Frank Sinatra – No One Cares (1959) (with altered lyrics)
- Duke Ellington – Piano in the Foreground (1961)
- Ella Fitzgerald – Ella Swings Gently with Nelson (1962), and Newport Jazz Festival: Live at Carnegie Hall (1973)
- Al Hirt – Honey in the Horn (1963)
- Maynard Ferguson – Chameleon (1974)
- Roy Eldridge – Happy Time (1975)
- Stéphane Grappelli, Joe Pass, Niels-Henning Ørsted Pedersen – Tivoli Gardens, Copenhagen, Denmark (1980)
- Joe Pass – Virtuoso No. 4 (1983, recorded in 1973)
- Mark Murphy – Beauty and the Beast (1986)
- Stan Getz with Kenny Barron – Anniversary! (1987)
- Hamiet Bluiett with Ted Dunbar – Ballads and Blues (1994)
- Joe Lovano with Tom Harrell – Live at the Village Vanguard (1994)
- Rickie Lee Jones – It's Like This (2000)
- Jamie Cullum – Pointless Nostalgic (2002)

== See also ==
- List of 1930s jazz standards
- The Big Shave (the song features in this Martin Scorsese short film).
