= The Best of Village People =

Greatest hits album by Village People
- Released: March 22, 1994
- Genre: Disco
- Length: 76:31
- Label: Casablanca
- Producer: Jacques Morali

Village People chronology
Greatest Hits '89 Remixes (1989)	The Best of Village People (1994)	The Very Best Of (1998)

Professional ratings
Review scores
Source	Rating
AllMusic	4.5/5 stars
Music Week	4/5 stars
Select	3/5 medals

The Best of Village People is a compilation album by American disco group Village People, released by Casablanca Records in 1994. AllMusic critic Steve Huey calls it "the clear-cut choice for disco and camp fanatics who want a detailed portrait of the group's career."

== Track listing ==
No.	Title	Writer(s)	Original release	Length
1.	"Y.M.C.A."	Jacques Morali, Henri Belolo, Victor Willis	Cruisin' (1978)	4:46
2.	"Macho Man" (12-inch Version)	Morali, Belolo, Willis, Peter Whitehead	Macho Man (1978)	5:12
3.	"Can't Stop the Music"	Morali, Belolo, Phil Hurtt, Whitehead	Can't Stop the Music soundtrack (1980)	3:36
4.	"San Francisco (You've Got Me)"	Morali, Belolo, Hurtt, Whitehead	Village People (1977)	5:19
5.	"In Hollywood (Everybody Is a Star)"	Morali, Belolo, Hurtt	Village People	4:53
6.	"Ready for the 80's" (12-inch Version)	Morali, Belolo, Hurtt, Whitehead	DJ promo-only; from Live and Sleazy (1979)	6:52
7.	"Key West"	Morali, Belolo, Willis, Whitehead	Macho Man; B-side of "Macho Man" single	5:44
8.	"In the Navy"	Morali, Belolo, Willis	Single version; from Go West (1979)	3:43
9.	"Fire Island"	Morali, Belolo, Hurtt, Whitehead	Village People	5:16
10.	"Go West" (12-inch Version)	Morali, Belolo, Willis	Go West	6:35
11.	"Village People"	Morali, Belolo, Hurtt, Whitehead	Village People; B-side of "San Francisco (You've Got Me)" single	5:08
12.	"Hot Cop"	Morali, Belolo, Willis	Cruisin'	6:20
13.	"In the Navy" (12-inch Version)	Morali, Belolo, Willis	Go West	6:21
14.	"Y.M.C.A." (12-inch Version)	Morali, Belolo, Willis	Cruisin'	6:46

== Personnel ==
Village People

- Victor Willis – cop, lead vocals
- Ray Simpson – cop, lead vocals (tracks 3, 6)
- Alex Briley – military man
- David Hodo – construction worker
- Glenn M. Hughes – biker
- Randy Jones – cowboy
- Felipe Rose – Indian chief

Technical

- Jacques Morali – producer
- Henri Belolo – executive producer
- Horace Ott – string and horn arranger and conductor
- Michael Hutchinson – assistant producer, engineer
- Harry Weinger – compilation producer
- Bill Levenson – compilation executive producer
- Richard Bauer – project director
- Terri Tierney – project coordinator
- Catherine Ladis – project assistant
- Wayne Edwards – essay
- Mark Weinberg – package design
- Joseph M. Palmaccio – digital remastering
- Bruce Pilato Archives – photo
