= Can't Stop the Music (song) =

Single by Village People

from the album Can't Stop the Music
- B-side: "Milkshake", "Liberation"
- Released: 1980
- Recorded: 1979
- Genre: Disco
- Length: 3:37
- Label: Casablanca
- Songwriter: Jacques Morali
- Producer: Jacques Morali

Village People singles chronology
"Sleazy" (1979)	"Can't Stop the Music" (1980)	"Magic Night" (1980)

"Can't Stop the Music" is a song recorded by American disco group the Village People. As the group's first release after the exit of original lead singer Victor Willis, with lead vocals sung by replacement cop Ray Simpson, the song was the first Village People single since their commercial breakthrough to not chart inside the US top 40, though it fared much better in Europe (reaching #7 in Belgium, #10 in West Germany, #11 in the UK, #15 in Sweden, #18 in Ireland, and #19 in Austria), South Africa (reaching #1 in the country), and Oceania (reaching #1 in Australia and #2 in New Zealand). It is the title track from the soundtrack album of their feature film, Can't Stop the Music, which failed to attract a major audience, except in Australia.

Recently, Village People have included "Can’t Stop The Music" in their set, breaking tradition of the Cop singing lead and instead having two of the other members take over lead vocal duties as Victor takes a break in the middle of the show.

== Critical reception ==
Cash Box said that compared to the Village People's previous hits, this song "[emphasizes] the music a bit more and [softens] the normally strident beat." Record World said that "this joyous dancer reaches epic proportions via strings & a full chorus."

== Personnel ==
- Ray Simpson - vocals
- Felipe Rose - backing vocals
- Alex Briley - backing vocals
- Glenn Hughes - backing vocals
- David Hodo - backing vocals
- Randy Jones - backing vocals

== Charts ==
=== Weekly charts ===
Chart (1980–1981)	Peak position
Australia (Kent Music Report)	1
Austria (Ö3 Austria Top 40)	19
Belgium (Ultratop)	7
Finland (Suomen virallinen lista)	8
France (IFOP)	50
Ireland (IRMA)	18
New Zealand (RIANZ)	2
South Africa (Springbok)	1
Sweden (Sverigetopplistan)	15
UK Singles (OCC)	11
US Disco Singles (Billboard)	27
West Germany (Official German Charts)	10

=== Year-end charts ===
Chart (1980)	Rank
Australia (Kent Music Report)	6
South Africa	7

== Covers ==
Puerto Rican boy band Menudo recorded a Spanish-language adaptation of the song, entitled "No Se Puede Parar la Música", in 1981.

A clip from the first live episode of Emu's All Live Pink Windmill Show on 13 July 1984, in which the Pink Windmill Kids enthusiastically introduce themselves before launching into a rendition of "Can't Stop the Music", became an Internet meme in late 2016, and in early 2017 the kids in the sequence (with the exception of Spencer, who was unavailable) reunited to remake the segment in aid of Comic Relief.

The Filipino novelty group Charing recorded a Tagalog parody cover version titled "Wala Na Bang Lalaki (Can't Stop The Music)" at the same year. The track was released by Universal Records and later compiled in the 2009 release The Bongga Collection which was a compilation of Bonnga! and Bongga 2 (track 21; last track of the collection).
