= Live and Sleazy =

Live album / Studio album by Village People
- Released: September 1979
- Genre: Disco
- Length: 70:14
- Label: Casablanca
- Producer: Jacques Morali

Village People chronology
| Go West (1979) | Live and Sleazy (1979) | Can't Stop the Music (1980) |

Singles from Live and Sleazy
- 1. "Ready for the 80's" Released: October 1979; 2. "Sleazy" Released: 1979

Live and Sleazy is the first live album and fifth studio album by the Village People and features a mixture of live and studio recordings. It was released as a double LP. The album featured numerous lead singers: original cop Victor Willis on the entire "Live" disk; on the "Sleazy" disk, construction worker David Hodo on track 1, Ray Simpson (who replaced Willis as the cop) on tracks 2, 3, and 5, and G.I. Alex Briley on track 4. Horace Ott is credited as the arranger and conductor of the string and horn sections. The musicians were credited as Bittersweet.

Victor Willis had announced plans for the live portion of this album be remastered and reissued as a stand alone live album titled “Village People Live At The Greek Theatre” in 2018. Other songs left off the original release though performed on the 1979 tour include "Key West", "Go West", "Village People", and "I Wanna Shake Your Hand".

== Critical reception ==
Professional ratings
Review scores
| Source | Rating |
|---|---|
| AllMusic | 2/5 stars |

Cash Box called the song "Sleazy" "an amusing self-parody which, vocally, relies more than ever on the group's zealous choral work." Record World called it "great dance music."

== Track listing ==
All music composed by Jacques Morali

=== Live ===
| No. | Title | Songwriter | Length |
|---|---|---|---|
| 1. | "Fire Island" | J. Morali, H. Belolo, B. Whitehead, P. Hurtt | 4:01 |
| 2. | "Hot Cop" | J. Morali, H. Belolo, V. Willis | 6:00 |
| 3. | "Medley: San Francisco (You've Got Me) / In Hollywood (Everybody is a Star)" | J. Morali, H. Belolo, B. Whitehead, P. Hurtt | 11:07 |
| 4. | "Macho Man" | J. Morali, H. Belolo, V. Willis, B. Whitehead | 6:00 |
| 5. | "In the Navy" | J. Morali, H. Belolo, V. Willis | 6:25 |
| 6. | "Y.M.C.A." | J. Morali, V. Willis | 8:00 |

=== Sleazy ===
All songs written by J. Morali, H. Belolo, B. Whitehead, P. Hurtt

| No. | Title | Length |
|---|---|---|
| 1. | "Sleazy" | 6:10 |
| 2. | "Rock and Roll Is Back Again" | 7:00 |
| 3. | "Ready for the 80's" | 6:38 |
| 4. | "Save Me" (Ballad) | 4:00 |
| 5. | "Save Me" (Uptempo Version) | 5:07 |

Note: The Rebound Records CD release placed the studio tracks before the live tracks.

== Personnel ==
Village People

- Victor Willis – lead vocal on "Live" (album)
- Ray Simpson – lead vocals on "Sleazy" (album)
- David "Scar" Hodo – backing vocals, lead vocals on "Sleazy" (song)
- Alex Briley – backing vocals, lead vocals on "Save Me (Ballad)"
- Randy Jones – backing vocals
- Felipe Rose – backing vocals
- Glenn M. Hughes – backing vocals

Production

- Jacques Morali – producer
- Horace Ott – string and horn arrangements, conductor
- Michael Hutchinson – mixing on "Sleazy" side
- Joe Barbaria – engineer
- Michael Hutchinson – engineer
- Steve Mitchell – engineer
- Carla Bandini – assistant engineer
- Chris Fergesen – assistant engineer
- Derek Du Nann – assistant engineer
- Doug Grinbergs – assistant engineer
- Jon Smith – assistant engineer
- Matthew Weiner – assistant engineer
- Stephen Lumel – art direction
- Lynn Goldsmith – photography

Bittersweet

- Albert Finney – guitar
- Keith Starkey – bass
- Greg Baker – drums
- Chuck Kentis – synthesizer
- Zack Stephens – synthesizer
- Lawrence Killian – percussion

Additional percussion and background vocals

- L.Waymer – percussion
- C. St. Charles – percussion
- Ray Simpson – percussion
- Milt Grayson – percussion
- Peter Whitehead – percussion
- D. Andres – percussion

== Charts ==
| Chart (1979) | Peak position |
|---|---|
| Australian Albums (Kent Music Report) | 69 |
| Canadian Albums (RPM) | 23 |
| Japanese Albums (Oricon) | 80 |
| Norwegian Albums (VG-lista) | 13 |
| Swedish Albums (Sverigetopplistan) | 25 |
| US Billboard 200 | 32 |

== Certifications and sales ==
| Region | Certification | Certified units/sales |
|---|---|---|
| Canada (Music Canada) | Platinum | 100,000^{^} |
| United States (RIAA) | Gold | 800,000 |
Summaries
| Worldwide | — | 2,000,000 |
^{^} Shipments figures based on certification alone.
