= Can't Stop the Music =

1980 film

- Theatrical release poster
- Directed by: Nancy Walker
- Written by: Allan Carr; Bronté Woodard
- Produced by: Allan Carr; Henri Belolo; Jacques Morali
- Starring: Village People; Valerie Perrine; Caitlyn Jenner (Note: Known as Bruce Jenner until her gender transition in 2015.); Steve Guttenberg; Paul Sand; Tammy Grimes; June Havoc; Barbara Rush; Altovise Davis; Marilyn Sokol; The Ritchie Family
- Cinematography: Bill Butler
- Edited by: John F. Burnett
- Music by: Jacques Morali
- Color process: Metrocolor
- Production company: EMI Films
- Distributed by: Associated Film Distribution
- Release date: June 20, 1980
- Running time: 124 minutes
- Country: United States
- Language: English
- Budget: $13.5–20 million
- Box office: $2 million

Can't Stop the Music is a 1980 American musical comedy film directed by Nancy Walker in her only directed featured film. Written by Allan Carr and Bronté Woodard, the film is a pseudo-biography of the 1970s disco group the Village People loosely based on the actual story of how the group formed. The film also stars Valerie Perrine, Caitlyn Jenner in her film debut, Steve Guttenberg, Paul Sand, Tammy Grimes, June Havoc, Barbara Rush, Altovise Davis, Marilyn Sokol, and The Ritchie Family in their only film.

Produced by Thorn EMI Screen Entertainment (formerly EMI Films), distributed by independent distributor Associated Film Distribution (AFD), the film was released after disco's peak. It received largely negative reviews from critics and was a box office bomb. Alongside Xanadu, Can't Stop the Music is known for inspiring the creation of the Golden Raspberry Awards, winning the first Razzies for Worst Picture and Worst Screenplay at the 1st Golden Raspberry Awards.

== Plot ==
Songwriter Jack Morell quits his job at a local record store to escape his tough-minded boss and gets a break DJing at a disco called Saddle Tramps. His roommate Samantha "Sam" Simpson, a retired model, attends the disco one night. While avoiding advances from the sleazy owner Benny Murray, the crowd's response to a song that he composed for her ("Samantha") convinces her to help him obtain a record deal. Her ex-boyfriend Steve Waits, president of Marrakech Records, is more interested in rekindling their romantic relationship than in Jack's music but listens to a demo.

Deeming Jack's vocals inadequate, Sam recruits neighbor and Saddle Tramps waiter/go-go boy Felipe Rose (the Indian), fellow model David "Scar" Hodo (the construction worker, who daydreams of stardom in the solo number "I Love You to Death"), and Randy Jones (the cowboy) on the streets of Greenwich Village, offering dinner to obtain their participation. Sam's former agent Sydney Channing orders her long-suffering Girl Friday Lulu Brecht to attend, hoping to lure back the star. Ron White, a lawyer from St. Louis, is mugged by an elderly woman while delivering a cake from Sam's sister. Brecht gives Jack drugs, which unnerves him when her friend, fellow model and dancer Alicia Edwards, brings singing cop Ray Simpson (the policeman), but Jack records the quartet on "Magic Night". Ron, pawed all night by the man-hungry Brecht, is overwhelmed by culture shock and leaves.

Ron apologizes to Sam the next day, attributing it to being a Gemini. They spend the night together. Newly interested in helping, Ron offers his Wall Street office to hold auditions. There, Glenn M. Hughes (the leatherman) performs "Danny Boy" atop a piano; he and Alex Briley (the G.I.), a stagehand at a theater where Sam's friend Alicia Edwards works, join the group, now a sextet. Ron's boss, Richard Montgomery, overwhelmed by the carnival atmosphere, insists that the firm not represent the group, and Ron quits.

Ron suggests a new location for rehearsal space at the YMCA and the group cuts a demo ("Liberation") for Marrakech. Steve sees limited appeal and Sam refuses his paltry contract. Reluctant to use her own savings, they decide to self-finance by throwing a pay-party.

To bankroll the party, Sam acquiesces to Channing's plea to return for a TV advertising campaign for milk, provided the Village People are featured. The lavish number "Milkshake" begins as Sam pours milk for six little boys in the archetypal costumes with the promise they'll grow up to be the Village People. The advertisers reject the spot. Norma then invites the group to debut at her charity fundraiser in San Francisco. When Sam lures Steve by falsely promising him a romantic weekend, Ron objects and Sam ends their romantic relationship. Jack and his former chorus girl mother Helen negotiate with Steve, who is charmed by her kreplach, and they discuss T-shirt merchandising for the Japanese market.

In their San Francisco dressing room before the show, Ron proposes to Sam. Montgomery appears, seeking to rehire Ron as a junior partner representing the group. Following a set by The Ritchie Family ("Give Me a Break"), the Village People triumphantly debut before a cheering crowd ("Can't Stop the Music").

== Cast ==
- Steve Guttenberg as Jack Morell
- Valerie Perrine as Samantha "Sam" Simpson
- Caitlyn Jenner as Ron White
- Paul Sand as Steve Waits
- Tammy Grimes as Sydney Channing
- Village People:
  - Alex Briley as Alex the G.I.
  - David Hodo as David the Construction Worker
  - Glenn Hughes as Glenn the Leatherman
  - Randy Jones as Randy the Cowboy
  - Felipe Rose as Felipe the Indian
  - Ray Simpson as Ray the Policeman
- June Havoc as Helen Morell
- Barbara Rush as Norma White
- Altovise Davis as Alicia Edwards
- Marilyn Sokol as Lulu Brecht
- Russell Nype as Richard Montgomery
- Jack Weston as Benny Murray
- Leigh Taylor-Young as Claudia Walters
- Dick Patterson as the Record store manager

== Production ==
=== Development ===
Originally titled Discoland... Where the Music Never Ends, Can't Stop the Music was a fictionalized account of the formation of the Village People. Allan Carr announced the film in June 1979, describing it as "Singing in the Rain for the disco crowd" and stating that the film would star the Village People, Valerie Perrine, Tammy Grimes, Chita Rivera, Barbara Rush, Pat Ast and Caitlyn Jenner. It was to be the first in a three picture slate from Carr, the others including Chicago and The Josephine Baker Story starring Diana Ross. Filming was to start on August 20 of that year and was financed by EMI, then under the aegis of Barry Spikings. When asked why EMI were making a film about disco so long after Saturday Night Fever, Spikings said, "I hope it is different. The film breaks new ground."

The film's director, Nancy Walker, a theater, film, and television star since the 1940s, had been nominated for two Tony Awards, four Golden Globe Awards, and eight Emmy Awards. Walker had guest starred as Rhoda Morgenstern (Valerie Harper)'s mother Ida Morgenstern in several episodes of The Mary Tyler Moore Show and continued that role in its spin-off Rhoda. After establishing the character, Walker directed some episodes of both series, along with episodes of other sitcoms. Can't Stop the Music was her lone effort at theatrical film direction.

=== Casting ===
The film's supporting cast includes Tammy Grimes, Russell Nype, June Havoc, Altovise Davis, Jack Weston and Leigh Taylor-Young. Chita Rivera and Pat Ast were initially cast but dropped out of the film's production.

Can't Stop the Music was Caitlyn Jenner's film debut (as Bruce Jenner), after becoming famous for three world record-setting performances in the Decathlon, and a Gold medal win at the 1976 Olympic Games. Jenner's record stood from 1975 until shortly before this film's 1980 release. Jenner did not appear in another film until Adam Sandler's Jack and Jill (2011), which, like Can't Stop the Music, won the Golden Raspberry Award for Worst Picture. Carr said, "Jenner is going to be the Robert Redford of the 80s, and this film will do for Valerie what Carnal Knowledge did for Ann-Margret."

The Village People auditionees depicted in the film included Blackie Lawless (a member of the glam-punk group New York Dolls and heavy metal group W.A.S.P.) and James Marcel (who would later find greater success with the name James Wilder). Background dancers included Perri Lister, girlfriend of Billy Idol and mother to his son Willem Broad, and Peter Tramm, who would go on to appear in dozens of music videos and double for Kevin Bacon in Footloose.

Ray Simpson's role was originally intended for Victor Willis, the original lead singer of the Village People who left the group during pre-production of this film. Morali had hired Willis' then-wife, Phylicia Ayers-Allen, to portray his girlfriend Alicia Edwards. When Willis left the group, Ayers-Allen quit the movie and was replaced by Altovise Davis.

"This movie's a revolution," said Carr. "I mean this movie is launching whole new careers and we need new stars today. Warren and Ryan and Redford - these people are way over 40."

Carr had attempted to cast Olivia Newton-John in this film as Samantha Simpson, but after discussions between her producer, John Farrar, and Morali over who would write Newton-John's numbers, Newton-John instead signed on to play the lead in Xanadu. "It wasn't only money," said Carr, "it was creative control and other demands." Newton-John has said in interviews since, she did not understand Carr's statement, since her only "demand" was that Farrar write two songs for her to sing in the film, which was the same "demand" she made in Grease.

=== Filming ===
The schedule of the film was 11 weeks: eight in Los Angeles, two in New York and one in San Francisco. A proposed week of filming on Fire Island was scrapped due to fear of the weather. Carr was coming off a massive worldwide hit with the pop musical Grease when shooting took place between May and July 1979 at the height of the disco craze. Carr took a hands-on role with the production, and personally directed and cast the male athlete extras for the "Y.M.C.A." musical sequence.

Shooting took place at MGM Studios in Culver City, California, with location shooting in New York City and San Francisco. Location shooting in New York was somewhat complicated by adjacent protests by gay activists over the William Friedkin film Cruising (starring Al Pacino), which was filming on location nearby. The two productions were mistaken for each other more than once, with protestors disrupting the Can't Stop the Music location shoots when they had intended to halt production of Cruising. A few weeks prior to release, Jenner and Perrine hosted a TV special, Allan Carr's Magic Night, to promote the film.

Tensions between Walker and Perrine rose on the set to the point that Walker would not be present for scenes featuring Perrine, leaving director of cinematography Bill Butler to direct in her place. Additionally, Perrine was reportedly unhappy that a dance number in which she performed was cut from the film.

Carr said he decided to change the title during filming because, as the music score included older ballads and Broadway numbers, it would be inaccurate to call it Discoland. However, the decision was made shortly after Disco Demolition Night, which effectively ended the popularity of the genre.

During filming, sales for the Village People's albums started to decline and disco became increasingly unfashionable. "They'll still be hot," said Carr of the Village People. "If not I will resurrect them." Two of the band's biggest hits, "In the Navy" and "Macho Man," do not appear in the film, though Perrine wears a T-shirt emblazoned with the words "Macho Woman" as she jogs through the men's locker room at the YMCA. Another reference to one of the band's songs, "San Francisco (You've Got Me)," appears in the opening credits, as Jack Morrell (Steve Guttenberg) passes a group of three women with the words "San Francisco" printed on their T-shirts.

The band's silver and white costumes in the "Milkshake" sequence and red costumes in the finale sequences were designed by Theoni V. Aldredge.

Bernard Delfont declared "for the first time ever in a musical, a British choreographer Arlene Phillips has challenged Hollywood on its own ground in creating the dance routines."

After filming, EMI Films announced it was so pleased with Nancy Walker's direction that she had been signed to make three more films, one for Carr, one for EMI and one for both. "She did such a magnificent job on her first film that this is the result," said Barry Spikings. "There aren't many lady directors and probably none that have made a movie of this size. What's more she did it on a budget."

Writer Bronte Woodward died shortly after the film was released.

=== Music ===
1. "The Sound of the City" - David London
2. "Samantha" - David London
3. "I Love You to Death" - Village People
4. "Sophistication" - The Ritchie Family
5. "Give Me a Break" - The Ritchie Family
6. "Liberation" - Village People
7. "Magic Night" - Village People
8. "Y.M.C.A." - Village People
9. "Milkshake" - Village People
10. "Can't Stop the Music" - Village People

Jack's song "Samantha" is credited in the film as being sung by David London, a pseudonym for rock singer Dennis "Fergie" Frederiksen, who was the lead singer for several popular rock bands during the 1980s whose biggest success came as one of the lead singers on Toto's Isolation album, released in 1984. London/Frederiksen also sings a second song on the soundtrack, "The Sound of the City".

While the film's soundtrack album contains the 10 songs from the film, the incidental score by Jacques Morali and Henri Belolo was released on LP only in Australia. One of the songs in the film's background score is the instrumental backing track of "Like an Eagle", a hit song by another Casablanca Records artist, Dennis Parker.

== Release ==
=== Box office ===
By the time of the film's release during the summer of 1980, the disco genre had not only peaked in the United States but also was experiencing a backlash there. As a result, the film received scathing reviews from critics and performed poorly at the box office. At a cost estimated at $20 million, the film was a colossal failure financially, bringing in only a tenth of that in gross revenue, and is considered one of the reasons for the downfall of AFD. "Our timing was wrong, and in this business, timing is everything," wrote Lew Grade, who invested in the movie.

The soundtrack album was better received, and while it reached only No. 49 on the U.S. Billboard 200 (the first Village People album not to go Gold), it reached No. 9 on the UK Albums Chart and No. 1 in Australia. The film itself also performed well in Australia, where the world premiere preview was shown at the Paramount Theatre, Sydney on June 1, 1980, with the after party held at Maxy's. The BBC bought the film for two showings for $3.5 million, which caused much controversy at the time, while ABC in America paid $6 million.

Carr's next film, Grease 2, brought in more than twice as much on its opening weekend as this film grossed in its entire run. Even though it was considered a failure, Grease 2 nearly made back its investment in its U.S. gross alone.

Ice cream chain Baskin-Robbins sold a flavor called "Can't Stop the Nuts" as part of the promotion of the film.

== Reception and legacy ==
Can't Stop the Music received generally negative reviews from critics. On Rotten Tomatoes it has an approval rating of 22% based on 18 reviews, with an average rating of 3.4/10. The New York Times gave the film a scathing review, calling it "thoroughly homogenized". Variety magazine felt likewise, writing "The Village People, along with ex-Olympic decathlon champion [Caitlyn] Jenner, have a long way to go in the acting stakes." Gene Siskel and Roger Ebert selected the film as one of their "dogs of the year" in a 1980 episode of Sneak Previews. They commented that while the musical sequences are decent, even a musical film needs a decent narrative, which in the case of Can't Stop the Music was crowded out by an overabundance of unrelated characters.

Rex Reed gave the film 3 (out of 4) stars, writing, "The big surprise is that although Can't Stop the Music is certainly one of the silliest movies ever made, it is also a vibrant and uplifting musical whose energy succeeded in both confusing and entertaining me so completely that I'm not sure I can even begin to assess it rationally. All I can tell you is that it is worth seeing twice, and from me that is rare praise indeed." Filmink magazine argued the movie, while full of flaws, was "still worthy of serious re-appraisal" because of its "remarkably positive depiction of queer life, which is shown to be full of friendship, dancing, singing, fun and camaraderie", its loving portrayal of New York and the fact it was directed by a woman.

The film contributed to the collapse of EMI Films as a strong moviemaking force in Hollywood. It contributed to Spikings leaving EMI.

Spikings later reflected:

It was against my values, but I thought it would make a lot of money. It was the only film I ever made just to make money and that is the wrong way. You have to make something because you believe in it... [The film] was planned at a time when the world looked black: the news was all of violence, kidnapping and hostages. We were looking for a product which, with its very exuberance and even mindlessness, would be right for the escapist mood in America.

The film has become a New Year tradition in Australia. The Nine Network broadcasts it every year in the early hours of New Year's Day, immediately following the fireworks.

=== Accolades ===
Can't Stop the Music was the first winner of the Worst Picture Golden Raspberry Award, for it was a double feature of this and Xanadu that inspired John J. B. Wilson to start the Razzies. The film is listed in Wilson's book The Official Razzie Movie Guide as one of "The 100 Most Enjoyably Bad Movies Ever Made".

Award	Category	Nominee(s)	Result
Golden Raspberry Awards (1980)	Worst Picture	Allan Carr	Won
Golden Raspberry Awards (1980)	Worst Director	Nancy Walker	Nominated
Golden Raspberry Awards (1980)	Worst Actor	Caitlyn Jenner	Nominated
Golden Raspberry Awards (1980)	Worst Actress	Valerie Perrine	Nominated
Golden Raspberry Awards (1980)	Worst Supporting Actress	Marilyn Sokol	Nominated
Golden Raspberry Awards (1980)	Worst Screenplay	Bronte Woodard and Allan Carr	Won
Golden Raspberry Awards (1980)	Worst Original Song	"(You) Can't Stop the Music" – Jacques Morali	Nominated
Golden Raspberry Awards (2005)	Worst "Musical" of Our First 25 Years		Nominated
Stinkers Bad Movie Awards	Worst Picture (Note: The film was nominated for Worst Picture both back in the original 1980 ballot (which only used Worst Picture) and in the expanded ballot released in 2006 (which used all the other categories seen here). Both times, it lost to Popeye.)	Allan Carr, Henri Belolo and Jacques Morali	Nominated
Stinkers Bad Movie Awards	Worst Director	Nancy Walker	Nominated
Stinkers Bad Movie Awards	Worst Actor	Steve Guttenberg	Won
Stinkers Bad Movie Awards	Worst Supporting Actor	Caitlyn Jenner	Won
Stinkers Bad Movie Awards	Worst Screenplay	Bronte Woodard and Allan Carr	Nominated
Stinkers Bad Movie Awards	Worst Song or Song Performance in a Film or Its End Credits	"Milkshake" – Village People	Nominated
Young Artist Awards	Best Family Music Album	Can't Stop the Music	Nominated

== Home media ==
Can't Stop the Music was released on Region 1 DVD by Anchor Bay Entertainment, under license from StudioCanal on April 16, 2002. Shout! Factory released a Blu-ray edition on June 11, 2019.

== See also ==
- Car Wash (1976)
- Saturday Night Fever (1977)
- FM (1978)
- Sgt. Pepper's Lonely Hearts Club Band (1978)
- Thank God It's Friday (1978)
- Skatetown, U.S.A. (1979)
- Roller Boogie (1979)
- Xanadu (1980)
- The Apple (1980)
- Fame (1980)
- Get Rollin' (1980), roller disco documentary

== Notes ==
Awards
New award	Razzie Award for Worst Picture; 1st Golden Raspberry Awards	Succeeded by Mommie Dearest
