= Ready for the 80's =

Single by Village People

from the album Live and Sleazy
- B-side: "Save Me (Ballad)"
- Released: October 1979
- Genre: Disco
- Label: Casablanca
- Producer: Jacques Morali

Village People singles chronology
| "Go West" (1979) | "Ready for the 80's" (1979) | "Sleazy" (1979) |

"Ready for the 80's" is a song recorded by American disco group the Village People. It was released in 1979 as the lead single from the group's fifth album Live and Sleazy. It peaked at #52 on the Billboard Hot 100 pop singles chart. On the US disco chart, along with the track, "Sleazy", "Ready for the 80's" peaked at #26.

The song featured the debut of Ray Simpson as lead singer of the group, replacing Victor Willis (who appears on earlier tracks on the album).

Billboard Magazine described "Ready for the 80's" as a "timely, upbeat and irresistible tip-of the hat to the upcoming decade" which "doesn't have the tongue in cheek humor of the group's three gold hits." Billboard specifically praised Simpson's lead vocals. Cash Box said it is "perhaps the most musically and lyrically attractive song the band has recorded under its new lineup," and also praised Simpson's vocals.

== Chart history ==
| Chart (1979) | Peak position |
|---|---|
| France (IFOP) | 30 |
| U.S. Billboard Hot 100 | 52 |
| U.S. Billboard Disco Top 100 | 26 |
