= Can't Stop the Music (album) =

Studio album / soundtrack by Village People
- Released: May 1980
- Genre: Disco
- Length: 34:56
- Label: Casablanca
- Producer: Jacques Morali

Village People chronology
Live and Sleazy (1979)	Can't Stop the Music (1980)	Renaissance (1981)

Singles from Can't Stop the Music
- 1. "Can't Stop the Music" Released: 1980; 2. "Magic Night" Released: 1980

Professional ratings
Review scores
Source	Rating
AllMusic	1/5 stars

Can't Stop the Music is the sixth studio album and first soundtrack by American disco group Village People, for their film Can't Stop the Music, released in 1980. Though the film was a commercial failure, the album was more well received, reaching number nine on the UK Albums Chart, number 47 on the Billboard 200 in the United States, and number one in Australia. The album was reissued on CD in 1999.

In addition to songs by Village People, the album also contains songs performed by David London and The Ritchie Family. Also included is a re-make of "Y.M.C.A.", which was actually the original 1978 recording with lead singer Victor Willis' voice removed and replaced by lead vocals from new singer Ray Simpson. Simpson's version was not released as a single and, hence, never charted. This is the first Village People album that was not certified Gold by the RIAA.

The album was Village People's last official album for Casablanca Records. They would leave the label for RCA Records shortly after its release. This was also the last album to feature Randy Jones.

== Publishing controversy ==
On May 7, 2012, music publishers Can't Stop Productions and Scorpio Music failed in their attempts to prevent the rights for three songs written by Willis ("Y.M.C.A.", "Milkshake", and "Magic Night") from reverting to Willis as scheduled, starting in 2013. In a historic ruling, Judge Barry Ted Moskowitz of the United States District Court for the Southern District of California ruled that Willis could in fact terminate his copyrights granted to the publishers because "a joint author who separately transfers his copyright interest may unilaterally terminate the grant." In response to the ruling, Willis stated, "I am just looking forward to having control of the songs."

As a result, Victor Willis, per the court order, recaptured 33% of the copyright for "Y.M.C.A.", "Milkshake", "Magic Night", and other Village People hits. A year later, Willis' copyright share increased to 50% on 13 Village People titles, as the jury found that producer Henri Belolo was not a joint author of the lyrics.

== Track listing ==
Side one
No.	Title	Writer(s)	Artist	Length
1.	"Can't Stop the Music"	Jacques Morali; Henri Belolo; Phil Hurtt; Peter Whitehead	Village People	3:35
2.	"Samantha"	Morali; Belolo; Hurtt	David London	3:15
3.	"Give Me a Break"	Morali; Belolo; The Ritchie Family	The Ritchie Family	3:30
4.	"Liberation"	Morali; Belolo; Hurtt; Whitehead	Village People	3:33
5.	"Magic Night"	Morali; Belolo; Victor Willis	Village People	3:22

Side two
No.	Title	Writer(s)	Artist	Length
1.	"The Sound of the City"	Morali; Belolo; Hurtt	David London	4:31
2.	"Milkshake"	Morali; Belolo; Willis	Village People	2:54
3.	"Y.M.C.A."	Morali; Belolo; Willis	Village People	3:21
4.	"I Love You to Death"	Morali; Belolo; Hurtt; Whitehead	Village People	3:03
5.	"Sophistication"	Morali; Belolo; Hurtt; Horace Ott	The Ritchie Family	3:52

== Charts ==
=== Weekly charts ===
Chart (1980)	Peak position
Australian Albums (Kent Music Report)	1
Austrian Albums (Ö3 Austria)	20
Belgian Albums (BEA)	6
Canada Top Albums/CDs (RPM)	55
Danish Albums (IFPI)	5
Dutch Albums (Album Top 100)	20
Finnish Albums (Suomen virallinen lista)	2
Japanese Albums (Oricon)	36
New Zealand Albums (RMNZ)	4
Norwegian Albums (VG-lista)	17
Portuguese Albums (Musica & Som)	8
Spanish Albums (AFE)	1
Swedish Albums (Sverigetopplistan)	35
UK Albums (Official Charts)	9
US Billboard 200	47

=== Year-end charts ===
Chart (1980)	Peak position
Australian Albums (Kent Music Report)	9
New Zealand Albums (RMNZ)	40

== Certifications ==
Region	Certification	Certified units/sales
Australia (ARIA)	Platinum	50,000^{^}
Spain (Promusicae)	Gold	50,000^{^}
^{^} Shipments figures based on certification alone.
