= Sleazy =

Sleazy may refer to:

- Peter Christopherson (1955–2010), also known as "Sleazy", a British musician, band member of Throbbing Gristle and Coil
- Sleazy P. Martini, a character in the theatrical heavy metal band GWAR
- "Sleazy" (song), a 2010 song by Kesha
- "Sleazy", a song by Village People from the album Live and Sleazy, 1979
