= Eric Anzalone =

American singer; member of the Village People

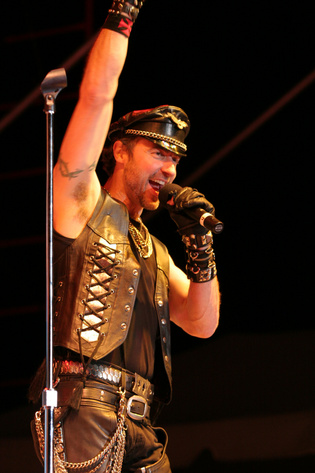
- Born: James Eric Anzalone; October 6, 1965 (age 60); Dayton, Ohio, U.S.
- Occupation: Singer
- Years active: 1995–present
- Spouses: Jennifer Alagna (m. 1996; div. 2003) Courtney Elliott (m. 2014; div. 2017)
- Children: 1 daughter

James Eric Anzalone (born October 6, 1965) is an American singer who was the Leatherman/Biker of the disco supergroup Village People from 1995 to 2017, replacing original member Glenn Hughes.

== Early life and education ==
Anzalone was born in Dayton, Ohio, but grew up in Watertown, New York, and Santa Barbara, California, graduating from San Marcos High School in 1983. He studied theater and music at the University of Miami and graduated summa cum laude in May 2012 from Arizona State University with a Bachelor's degree in Film and Media, and in 2018 he received a Master's degree in American Media and Popular Culture also from Arizona State.

== Career ==
Anzalone has performed in various stage productions around the world, including Berger in the European tour of HAIR and as a singer for Princess Cruises. He starred as Donatello in the world tour of the Teenage Mutant Ninja Turtles Coming Out of Our Shells and later as Raphael in the films A Turtles' Christmas and Turtle Tunes and in TV programs, including Lifestyles of the Rich & Famous. He also appeared on two episodes of VH1's short-lived series Love Lounge. In June 2012, Anzalone joined Experience Nirvana Productions as host, director, producer, and editor of the webcast TV show What Matters Most, which was featured on YouTube, and was awarded a 2016 Telly Award for Editing; the episode was "Dance for Kindness" about Orly Wahba, founder of Life Vest Inside.
