= Bronté Woodard =

American screenwriter (1940–1980)

Bronte Woodard
- Born: October 8, 1940; Alabama, U.S.
- Died: August 6, 1980 (aged 39); Los Angeles, California, U.S.
- Occupation: Writer

Bronte Woodard (October 8, 1940 – August 6, 1980) was an American writer whose credits include the adapted screenplay for the film Grease and the screenplay for the 1980 Village People film Can't Stop the Music (co-written with Grease producer Allan Carr). He also wrote a novel, Meet Me at the Melba.

Raised in Atlanta, he died of hepatitis-related liver failure at the age of 39 on August 6, 1980, in Los Angeles, California.

In 1976, Universal Studios announced plans to make a film of Anne Rivers Siddons' novel Heartbreak Hotel for which Woodard would write the screenplay. However, the novel was not actually filmed until several years after Woodard's death, reaching the screen under the title Heart of Dixie in 1989 with a screenplay by Tom McCown instead of Woodard.
