= Tiger Love (album) =

Studio album by Ray Simpson
- Released: 1978
- Recorded: 1978
- Studio: Sigma Sound, New York City; Sigma Sound, Philadelphia, Pennsylvania; A&R, New York City; Mediasound, New York City
- Genre: Soul/Disco
- Label: Warner Bros. Records
- Producer: Ashford & Simpson

Professional ratings
Review scores
Source	Rating
AllMusic	2.5/5 stars

Tiger Love is the only solo album by Bronx-born American soul singer and background vocalist Ray Simpson, released on Warner Bros. Records in 1978. Produced by Ashford & Simpson, it features the songs, "Slinky" and "My Love Is Understandin'".

== Track listing ==
All tracks composed Bobby Gene Hall, Jr. and Ray Simpson; except where indicated

1. "Tiger Love" - 4:12
2. "Slinky" - 4:32
3. "Good Naughty Night" - 4:29
4. "No One's Satisfied" - 5:21
5. "Give It Up" - 3:48
6. "You're The One" (John Davis) - 3:00
7. "I Never Thought I'd Fall in Love" - 4:21
8. "My Love Is Understandin'" - 5:56

== Personnel and production ==
- Arranged by Ashford & Simpson, John Davis, William Eaton (rhythm); John Davis (strings, horns)
- Backing vocals – Ashford & Simpson, Ray Simpson, Ullanda McCullough
- Bass – Francisco Centeno, Vince Fay
- Congas, Percussion – Larry B. Washington, Ralph MacDonald
- Drums – Jimmy Young, John Susswell
- Guitar – Bobby Gene Hall, Jr., Craig Snyder, Hugh McCracken, Keith L. Loving*, Ronnie James
- Keyboards – Arthur Jenkins, John Davis, Pat Rebillot, Valerie Simpson
- Synthesizer [Moog] – Ray Chew
