= Felipe Rose =

American musician (born 1954)

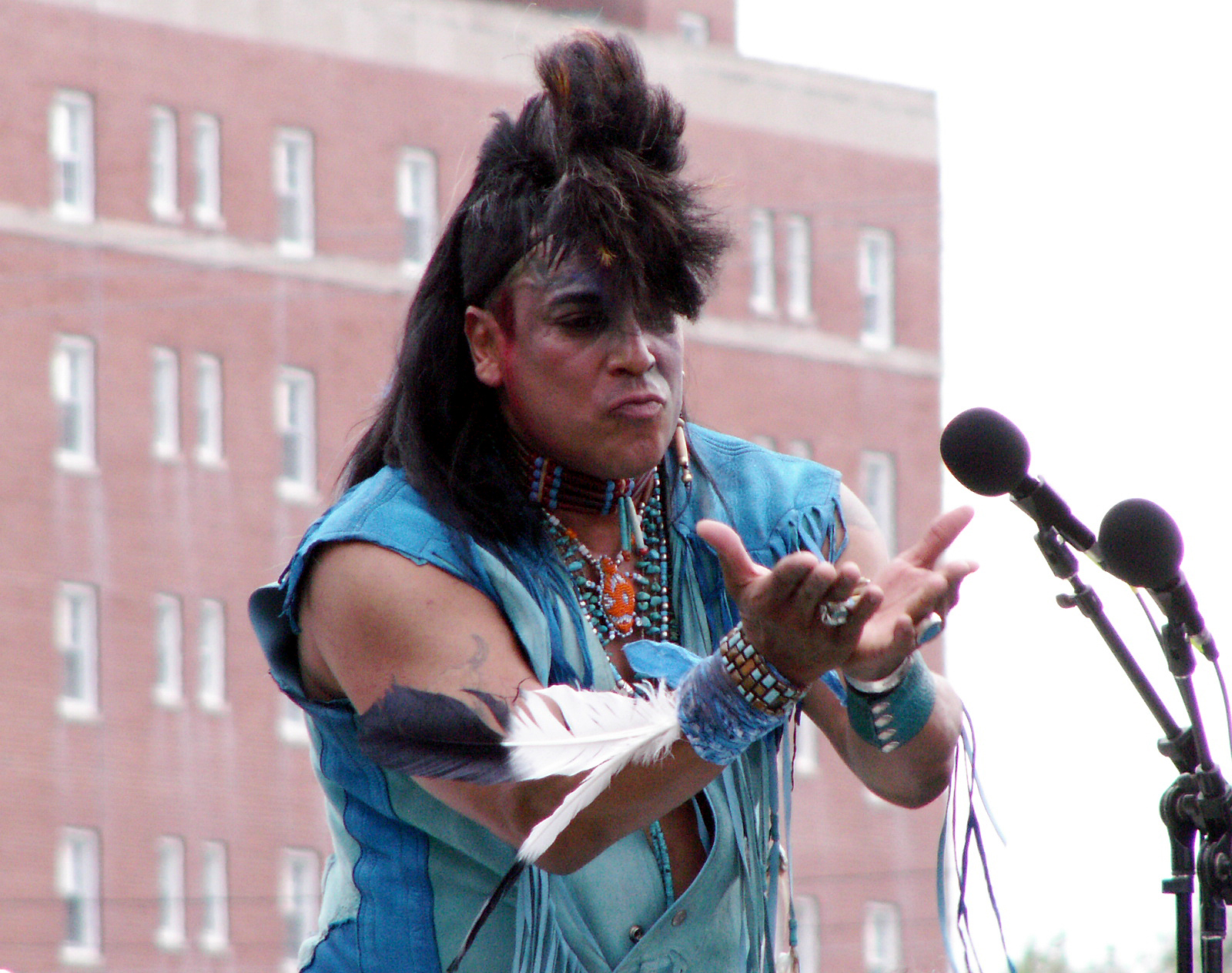
- Felipe Rose on stage

Background information
- Born: Felipe Ortiz Rose; January 12, 1954 (age 72); Manhattan, New York City, U.S.
- Genres: Disco
- Occupation: Singer
- Years active: 1970–present
- Formerly of: Village People
- Website: feliperose.com

Felipe Ortiz Rose (born January 12, 1954) is an American musician who was an original member of the disco group the Village People. While in the group, he performed as "The Indian", usually wearing a costume consisting of an imitation, "bespangled war bonnet", loincloth, and theatrical face paint. Rose was a member of the group from 1977 until 2017, when the name of the group was turned over to the original lead singer, Victor Willis. Rose subsequently launched a solo career and released the single "Going Back to My Roots" in 2018.

== Early years ==
Felipe Ortiz Rose was born in Manhattan. His father, reportedly of Lakota descent, moved to New York for work as a welder, where he met Rose's Puerto Rican mother. Rose has said his father was Mescalero Apache, Lakota, and Cherokee. He was raised in Brooklyn, where he displayed an interest in the arts during his childhood, and first dressed as "an Indian" while in school for "the Christopher Columbus parade and celebration."

After graduating from high school in 1972, he moved to Greenwich Village where he stayed with a succession of friends and acquaintances. He also spent time in Provincetown, Massachusetts, where he performed his "Indian" character in the Arthur Blake bicentennial revue.

He cites his mother was his main inspiration as she had been a dancer for the Copacabana during the 1940s and 1950s.

== Career ==
=== Village People ===
In the early 1970s, Rose was working as a nightclub dancer. He describes being encouraged by an aunt to begin dancing in what he says was "his father's tribal regalia," which he says led to his costume, acting and neon facepaint in the Village People. "His aunt, he has said, inspired him to work the Indian angle into his showbiz ambitions: 'Why not honor your father's heritage,' Rose has recalled her saying, 'and dress in your tribal regalia in your dance journey through culture?'"

Rose was working as a dancer and a bartender in the New York gay club, The Anvil, dressed "as an Indian" when he was discovered by French producer Jacques Morali and executive producer Henri Belolo and so became the first recruit for Village People.

In 1977, Village People had their first hit with "San Francisco", although this song became a hit only in the United Kingdom. Then in 1978 they had their first hits in the U.S. with "Macho Man" followed by "Y.M.C.A.".

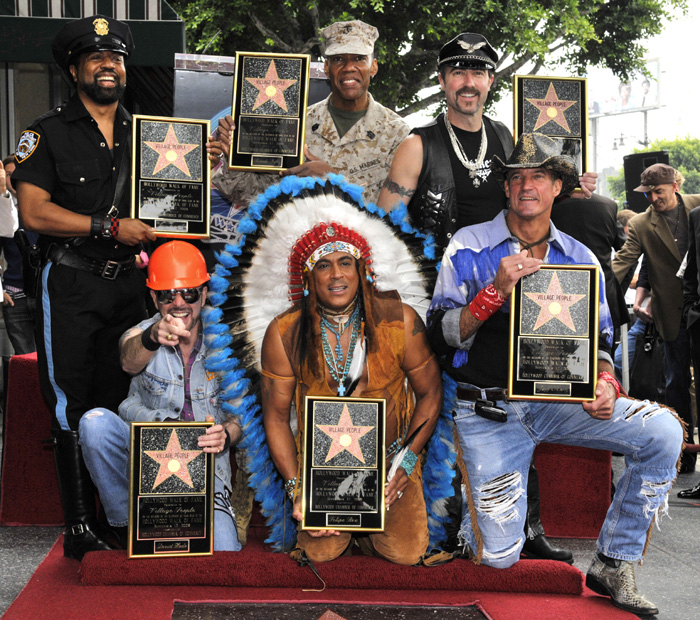
The Village People receive their Star on the Hollywood Walk of Fame. Rose is center front.

After a brief hiatus in the 1980s, Village People reformed with most of the 1970s lineup, and the members were board of directors for Sixuvus Ltd ("six of us" - named for the six members of the Village People), who managed the affairs and licensing of the Village People name. Rose continued to tour with the group alongside original GI Alex Briley, until 2017 when original lead singer/cop Victor Willis won over the rights to the name, and fired all the members in order to start a new touring lineup led by him.

=== Solo career ===
From 2000 to 2008, while still part of Village People, Felipe wrote and recorded "Trail of Tears," "We're Still Here," "Red Hawk Woman" and "Going Back to My Roots."

His single "Trails of Tears" won a NAMMY (Native American Music Awards) for Best Historical Recording. In 2002, Rose was the opening act of the fifth Annual Native American Music Awards celebrated at the Marcus Amphitheatre in Milwaukee, Wisconsin. His media company was the "Tomahawk Group".

Rose has appeared in the movies Can't Stop the Music (1980), The Best of Village People (1993), and Feathers and Leathers: The Story of the Village People (1999). He also participated in the 2000 documentary, Village People: The E! True Hollywood Story.

In 2008, Rose received a Star on the Hollywood Walk of Fame. He was inducted into the Native American Music Hall of Fame a month later.

His 2018 single, "Going Back to My Roots," begins with a Lakota prayer and includes a rap by Native American hip-hop artist Sten Joddi. He first performed the song during a tribute show of the 40th anniversary of Saturday Night Fever.

== Personal life ==
Rose is gay, he and Randy Jones were the only members of the classic Village People lineup who were not heterosexual.

After his mother's death, Rose moved to Richmond, Virginia. He briefly lived in Jersey City, New Jersey, though he found it to be too crowded.

In a 2008 interview, he stated that approximately four or five years prior, he moved to Asbury Park, New Jersey, on the advice of several friends who lived there, saying, "So I came down and I just fell in love with the shore... I love the diversity of Asbury because it brings everyone together. There is a very large gay and lesbian community here, but the diversity of artists is amazing; it's become very bohemian."

Rose is also a hobbyist cook, making dishes inspired by his Puerto Rican heritage. He says his mother was not a cook, preferring to prepare "five cans of Chef Boyardee and a loaf of bread", leading Rose to learn to cook at a young age. He pitched a cooking show to ABC, with the idea of preparing meals at various celebrities' houses. He then revamped the show idea with the late Chef Lou Petrozza, a Hell's Kitchen runner-up, but ABC declined unless the other Village People members were present. As of 2021, he continues to cook on his YouTube channel.

By 2014, he had become an ordained minister along with Eric the Biker, to gain the ability to marry fans. When asked if this was used for gay marriages, Rose claimed he once spontaneously married a gay couple while aboard a ship in Australia.

== See also ==
- List of Puerto Ricans
