= Mineshaft (gay club) =

Former sex and BDSM club in New York City

Coordinates: 40.740560°N 74.007583°W

General information
- Type: Sex club
- Location: Manhattan, New York City, 835 Washington Street, United States
- Opened: October 8, 1976
- Closed: November 7, 1985

Technical details
- Floor count: 2

Other information
- Facilities: roof deck, clothes check, dungeons / private rooms, slings, glory holes, bathtub

The Mineshaft was a members-only BDSM leather bar and sex club for gay men located at 835 Washington Street, at Little West 12th Street, in Manhattan, New York City, in the Meatpacking District, West Village, and Greenwich Village sections.

== History ==
The Mineshaft attracted a wide range of patrons, some famous. Among those who frequented the club were author Jack Fritscher (who was present at its opening night and attended hundreds of times), Fritscher's lover Robert Mapplethorpe (who took many pictures of the Mineshaft, was at one point its official photographer, and once said, "After dinner I go to the Mineshaft."), gay erotic artist Rex, and Annie Sprinkle, who claimed she was one of three women ever allowed in. Freddie Mercury, Vincente Minnelli, Rainer Werner Fassbinder, Rock Hudson, Michel Foucault, and Camille O'Grady are also known to have visited. Manager Wally Wallace (born James Wallace) said that he once refused entry to Mick Jagger, and a bouncer turned away Rudolf Nureyev.

There was no sign on the entrance; the exterior has been described as "grimy". The location had previously been used by a gay bar, Zodiac. The entrance to the club was up a flight of stairs, on the second floor. The door was staffed by someone who rejected anyone wearing preppie clothes or cologne, and this was a widely known part of what made the bar influential. Originally the Mineshaft occupied only the second floor; the club soon expanded into the first floor below, accessed by stairs in the back. The upper floor or bar (no alcohol was sold, for legal reasons) had a roof deck.

Promiscuity was celebrated at Mineshaft. Nudity or minimal clothing was encouraged, and a clothes check was provided. Areas were configured to encourage sex, including spaces designed to resemble a jail cell, the back of a truck, and dungeons; slings and cans of Crisco (at the time popular among gay men as a sexual lubricant preceding modern personal lubricant); spotlighted bathtubs in which men could let other men urinate on them; a wall of glory holes; and a scat room, which was soon abandoned as too extreme. Fisting was commonplace. Fist Fuckers of America (FFA), Total Ass Involvement League (TAIL), and numerous other fetish clubs held meetings there. Recreational drug use was also common.

The images and posters for the club were created by the gay erotic artist Rex.

The existence of the Mineshaft was widely known among gays who never visited; it has been called a "mythic[al]...space".

The Mineshaft operated from October 8, 1976, until it was closed by the New York City Department of Health on November 7, 1985, although tax problems played a significant role in its closing. It was New York's first gay club to close during the 1980s public health crackdown on gay clubs and bathhouses. After it closed, six men, associated with both the Mineshaft and an affiliated heterosexual club, the Hellfire, were charged with a variety of crimes. Four pleaded guilty, former New York City police officer Richard Bell was convicted, and the sixth fled the country to escape prosecution.

Wally Wallace donated the entirety of the Mineshaft's records, including artwork by Rex and Al Shapiro, to the Leather Archives and Museum in Chicago.

== Dress code ==
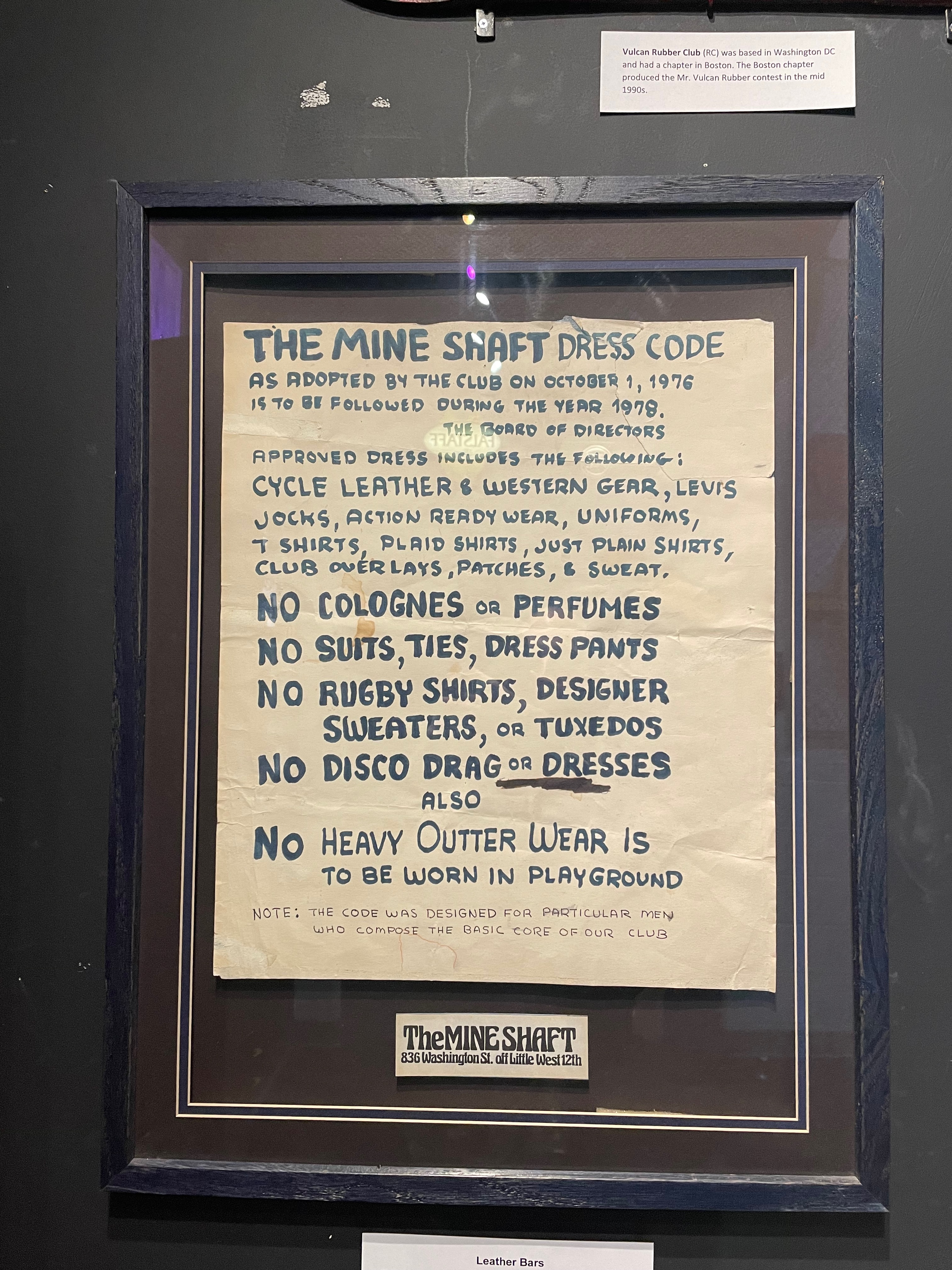
Mineshaft Dress Code on display at Leather Archives & Museum

A sign said the following:

The Mine Shaft dress code

as adopted by the club on October 1, 1976
is to be followed during the year 1978.

The Board of Directors

Approved dress includes the following:
Cycle leather & Western gear, levis
Jocks, action ready wear, uniforms,
T shirts, plaid shirts, just plain shirts,
Club overlays, patches, & sweat.

NO COLOGNES or PERFUMES
NO SUITS, TIES, DRESS PANTS
NO RUGBY SHIRTS, DESIGNER SWEATERS, or TUXEDOS
NO DISCO DRAG or DRESSES

also

NO HEAVY OUTTER [sic] WEAR IS TO BE WORN IN PLAYGROUND

NOTE: The code was designed for particular men who compose the basic core of our club

== Popular culture ==
The movie Cruising, starring Al Pacino, was intended to depict gay cruising as it existed at the Mineshaft, but the bar is not named in the movie. Since the Mineshaft would not allow filming, scenes from the movie were filmed at the Hellfire Club, which was decorated to resemble the Mineshaft. Regulars from the Mineshaft appeared as extras. Scenes were shot in streets and other locations near the Mineshaft. Pacino attended as part of researching his role. (A bar called the Mineshaft does not appear in the 1970 novel Cruising by Gerald Walker, which, with substantial changes, was the inspiration for the 1980 film of the same name.)

According to Jack Fritscher, Jacques Morali drew his inspiration for the four archetypes of the Village People from the Mineshaft's dress code. Glenn Hughes, the original leather biker of the Village People, frequently attended.

Freddie Mercury wears a Mineshaft T-shirt in the official video for the Queen song "Don't Stop Me Now", as does Brooks Ashmanskas' character Stanley in Episode 5 of the Netflix series Uncoupled.

== See also ==
- List of LGBTQ bars
