= The Anvil (gay club) =

Former sex club in New York City

- Entrance to the club, with closure notice on door (1985)

General information
- Type: Gay BDSM sex club
- Location: Chelsea, Manhattan, New York City, 500 West 14th Street, United States
- Opened: 1974
- Closed: 1985

The Anvil was a gay BDSM after-hours sex club located at 500 West 14th Street, Manhattan, New York City, that operated from 1974 to 1985.

== History ==
The club was housed in a building originally constructed in 1908, then known as "The Strand Hotel" with a saloon on the ground floor, that catered to sailors (Note: According to a court document of the time, the establishment was catering “to the class of trade that has business at the river front.”) and accepted only men as customers. By the 1970s, the building was housing a pay-by-the-hour hotel named Liberty Inn.

In the fall of 1974, The Anvil opened, with the main floor featuring a dance floor and a rectangular bar along with a performance area, all painted black. There was another small bar downstairs with a large screen on which gay male porn of the period was shown. Behind the screen, there was a "cavernous" and "dark" backroom that was used as a sex area. There were reportedly mock crucifixions, fistings, golden showers, and "plenty of anonymous sex." The club would accept "some drag queens" but not women.

On the main floor, the shows varied from performances by drag queens to guys often being suspended on ropes over the bar. Between shows, and to the sounds of "loud" disco music, there was dancing that was described to be "as fierce as a bottle of fresh poppers."

As a historian of that period wrote, "the spectators themselves were the performers."

Lou Reed was occasionally one of the many famous patrons inside and Freddie Mercury frequented the club when he lived in New York City from 1980 to 1982. Director William Friedkin shot in The Anvil some scenes for the 1980 film Cruising.

== Closure and legacy ==
The Anvil "quietly shut its doors" in 1985 following the closure of the Mineshaft by the city authorities amidst the AIDS scare. Its space is now used by a love hotel again. There are tours taking tourists to the building that used to house The Anvil and to other infamous places that mark New York's sexual history.

== See also ==
- Continental Baths
- Mineshaft (gay club)
- LGBT culture in New York City
- BDSM in culture and media
