= San Francisco (You've Got Me) =

1977 Village People song

Single by Village People

from the album Village People
- B-side: "Fire Island"
- Released: 1977
- Recorded: 1977
- Genre: Disco
- Length: 5:19
- Label: Casablanca
- Songwriters: Jacques Morali, Henri Belolo, Peter Whitehead, Phil Hurtt
- Producer: Jacques Morali

Village People singles chronology
"San Francisco (You've Got Me)" (1977)	"Village People" (1977)

"San Francisco (You've Got Me)" is the debut single by the American disco group Village People. It was released in 1977 as the lead single from their self-titled debut studio album. The song reached number fifteen on the Australian Kent Music Report and peaked at number two on the U.S. Billboard Bubbling Under Hot 100 chart.

Record World said that it is "based upon a driving dance beat, with a good, male r&b vocal."

Classic Rock History critic Brian Kachejian rated it the Village People's 10th greatest song, saying that it "is pure disco right from the opening cowbell."

== Music video ==
The song quickly became a hit and requests for the "group" to perform on shows such as Dick Clark's American Bandstand began pouring in. At that time, the "group" was only lead singer Victor Willis. Producer Jacques Morali hastily assembled a group around Willis to perform in a video for the song. Willis brought in Alex Briley who eventually became the group's G.I. character. Morali brought in a few friends, songwriter Peter Whitehead and dancer Felipe Rose who would become the group's Indian character.

== Chart positions ==
=== Weekly charts ===
Chart (1978)	Peak position
Australia (Kent Music Report)	15
U.S. Billboard Bubbling Under Hot 100	2

=== Year-end charts ===
Year-end chart performance for "San Francisco (You've Got Me)"
Chart (1978)	Position
Australia (Kent Music Report)	75
