= David Hodo =

American singer (born 1947)

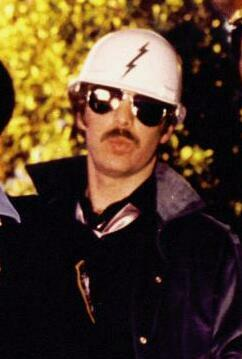
- Hodo as part of Village People in 1978

Background information
- Born: Richard Davis Hodo; July 7, 1947 (age 79); San Andreas, California, U.S.
- Occupation: Singer
- Years active: 1975–2013
- Formerly of: Village People

David Hodo (born Richard Davis Hodo; July 7, 1947, also known as David "Scar" Hodo) is an American dancer and singer. He is best known as a member of the group Village People, in which he was the construction worker character from 1978 to 1982 and from 1987 to 2013.

== Early life ==
Hodo was born in San Andreas, California, and was raised in Sacramento. He graduated in 1969 from California State University, Sacramento, where he majored in speech and acted in several campus productions, including Oh What a Lovely War, Carnival and Richard III.

== Career ==
In 1972, he moved to New York, making his Broadway debut in Doctor Jazz in 1975. Hodo appeared as a chorus member in numerous musicals, including Salvation, a touring company of Funny Girl in 1972, a Broadway revival of Pal Joey in 1976 and The Red BlueGrass Western Flyer Show at the Goodspeed Opera House in 1977. He was also a guest on What's My Line as a roller skating fire eater.

Hodo joined the Village People after he was one of hundreds who responded to an ad, and in 1978 and was with the group during its most commercially successful era. He appeared with the group in the 1980 musical film Can't Stop the Music and the accompanying promotional television special Magic Night which also featured Cher and Hugh Hefner. He left the Village People in 1982, but returned to the group in 1987, remaining until 2013 when he retired. Hodo has also appeared on numerous television programs, including Married... with Children, The Love Boat and The Osbournes.

In 2002, he released a cover of "My Sweet Lord" (originally recorded by George Harrison). In 2008, he released an EP featuring the single "The Kids'll Be Fine", partially inspired by school shootings in the United States.

In 2024, original Village People cop Victor Willis said that the Village People's hit song "Y.M.C.A." was not a gay anthem and threatened lawsuits to any news source that claimed it was. Hodo responded on social media denouncing Willis' claims, which led to a response by Willis in which he claimed that Jacques Morali (co-writer of "Y.M.C.A.") "hated" Hodo and told him to go "back in your hole before I crush you again". Previously in 2020, Willis had posted to facebook a video of the group with Hodo singing lead vocals, saying that a "scene with David Hodo's terrible voice single handedly ended Village People in 1980", before writing that Hodo "thought he could take my place in Village People as lead singer, lol."
