= Village People =

American disco group

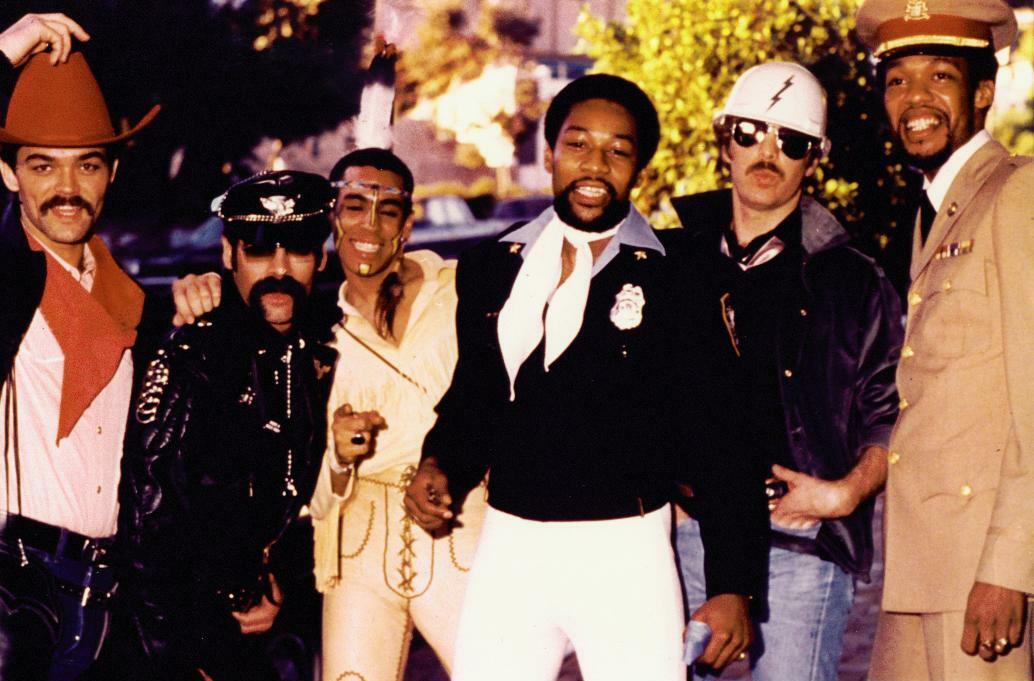
- Village People in 1978; From left: Randy Jones, Glenn Hughes, Felipe Rose, Victor Willis, David Hodo, Alex Briley

Background information
- Origin: Greenwich Village, Manhattan, New York City
- Genres: Disco; soul; funk; rock; R&B
- Years active: 1977–present
- Labels: RCA Victor; Casablanca; Mercury; Phonogram; Polydor; Ariola; Polygram; Black Scorpio; RCA Ariola; BMG Ariola; BMG; Universal; Sony
- Members: James Kwong; Jeffrey James Lippold; James Lee; Nicholas Manelick; Javier Perez
- Past members: Dave Forrest; Lee Mouton; Peter Whitehead; Miles Jaye; Ray Stephens; Mark Lee; Randy Jones; Glenn Hughes; G. Jeff Olson; David Hodo; Felipe Rose; Alex Briley; Ray Simpson; Eric Anzalone; Bill Whitefield; Jim Newman; Sonny Earl; Angel Morales; Chad Freeman; Isaac Lopez; Mark Mussler; Victor Willis
- Website: villagepeople.com

Village People is an American disco group known for its on-stage costumes and suggestive lyrics in their music. The group was originally formed by French producers Jacques Morali and Henri Belolo and lead singer Victor Willis following the release of the debut album Village People, which targeted disco's large gay audience. The group's name refers to Manhattan's Greenwich Village, with its reputation as a gayborhood. The characters were a symbolic group of American masculinity and macho gay-fantasy personas.

The group quickly became popular and moved into the mainstream, scoring several disco and dance hits internationally, including the hit singles "Macho Man", "In the Navy", "Go West", and "Y.M.C.A.", which was their biggest hit. In March 2020, the Library of Congress described "Y.M.C.A." as "an American phenomenon", and added the song to the National Recording Registry, which preserves audio recordings considered to be "culturally, historically, or aesthetically significant."

== History ==
=== 1977–1979 ===
French musical composer and producer Jacques Morali and his business partner, Henri Belolo, known collectively as Can't Stop Productions, were enjoying a successful string of hits in France and Europe. In 1977, they moved to New York City to attempt to break into the American market. Morali had written a few dance tunes when he was given a demo tape recorded by singer/actor Victor Willis. After hiring Willis to sing background vocals on the four tracks, Morali approached him and said, "I had a dream that you sang lead on my album and it went very, very big". Willis agreed to sing on the debut album Village People.

Songwriters Phil Hurtt and Peter Whitehead wrote the lyrics for the first album (Willis would subsequently take over writing duties for the group's biggest hits). The Village People studio band was called Gypsy Lane and was conducted by Horace Ott. Ott also provided many of the musical arrangements for Morali, who did not play any instruments.

The album became an international hit, and demand for live appearances soon followed. Morali and Willis hastily built a group of dancers around Willis to perform in clubs and videos. Willis hand-picked Alex Briley (who initially appeared in nondescript costumes before switching to G.I. uniforms), while Morali chose Felipe Rose (who claims Native American descent and dressed in costume as "an Indian") in a local gay BDSM after-hours sex club in Chelsea called The Anvil. The others were Mark Mussler (construction worker), Dave Forrest (cowboy), Lee Mouton (leatherman/biker), and Peter Whitehead (one of the group's early songwriters), who appeared on American Bandstand and in the video for the group's first hit, "San Francisco (You Got Me)".

When record sales soared, Morali and Willis saw the need for a permanent group. They took out an ad in a theatre trade paper which read: "Macho Types Wanted: Must Dance And Have A Moustache." Glenn Hughes (leatherman), Randy Jones (cowboy) and David Hodo (construction worker) were among the hundreds who answered the ad.

The original recording lineup of 1977 was expanded and defined by the famous "classic" performing group in 1978. The six-man classic iconic performing lineup featured Victor Willis (policeman/naval officer), Felipe Rose (native American), Alex Briley (soldier), Glenn Hughes (leatherman/biker), David Hodo (construction worker) and Randy Jones (cowboy). With these six members in place, The Village People went on to define the disco era. For their 1978 debut and with the "official" and "classic" performing lineup in place, the group did a hasty photo shoot for the cover of the already recorded Macho Man album. The album's title track catapulted the group into the mainstream, and their single "Y.M.C.A." from the group's third album Cruisin' became one of the most popular hits of the 1970s and remains a classic well into the 21st century.

In 1979, the United States Navy considered using their single "In the Navy" in a television and radio recruiting campaign. Belolo offered them permission if the Navy would help film a music video for it. The Navy provided access to Naval Station San Diego, where USS Reasoner, several aircraft, and the crew of the ship was used. This song was also performed on the TV series The Love Boat and Married... with Children, and in the 1996 comedy film Down Periscope.

The group's contemporary fame peaked in 1979 with a three-month North American tour, several appearances on The Merv Griffin Show and American Bandstand, and performing with Bob Hope to entertain US troops. They were also featured on the cover of Rolling Stone, vol. 289, April 19, 1979.

Willis left the group in August 1979, during production of the upcoming musical movie tentatively titled Discoland: Where the Music Never Ends (retitled Can't Stop The Music). He was replaced by Ray Simpson, brother of Valerie Simpson (of Ashford & Simpson), who had previously sung background vocals with the group on their 1979 tour. The end of 1979 saw the release of Live and Sleazy, a double album featuring Victor Willis on lead vocals on the "Live" disc and Simpson's debut with the group on the "Sleazy" disc.

=== 1980–1985 ===
In June 1980, the feature film Can't Stop the Music was released. The film was directed by Nancy Walker, written by Allan Carr and Bronte Woodard, had music and lyrics by Jacques Morali (except Willis, who penned the lyrics to "Milkshake" and "Magic Night") and starred Steve Guttenberg, Valerie Perrine, Jean-Claude Billmaer, and Caitlyn Jenner. The film was a box office failure, except in Australia. By the time it was released, disco's popularity had waned. At the 1st Golden Raspberry Awards, the movie won two Razzies for Worst Picture and Worst Screenplay; it was also nominated in almost all the other categories. Although the title song became a club play chart success and moderate radio hit, it was nominated for the Razzie for Worst Original Song and did not live up to sales expectations, never obtaining gold status as a single or album. The soundtrack also featured the talents of David London, who (under his real name Dennis "Fergie" Frederiksen) became the future lead singer of the rock band Toto and one of the main contributors to Village People's next album. The group embarked on a tour in promotion of the film in Australia and Japan. The Japanese show was filmed at Budokan and released on DVD as Village People Live In Japan.

The group appeared in the November 22, 1980 episode of The Love Boat (season four, episode seven). At the end of 1980, Jeff Olson joined the group as the cowboy.

In 1981, with new wave music becoming more popular than disco, Morali and Belolo ditched the familiar characters and re-branded Village People with a new look, inspired by the New Romantic movement, and released the album Renaissance. It only attracted minor, mostly negative attention, but it did produce the group's first hit single in Italy with "5 O'clock in the Morning".

Willis rejoined the group briefly in late 1981 for the writing and recording of the album Fox on the Box, released in Europe and Japan in 1982 and in the United States in 1983 under the title In the Street. David Hodo and Ray Simpson both left the group in 1982 with Mark Lee and Miles Jaye replacing them respectively. Jaye contributed lead vocals to a single in 1983 called "America", which would be added as an extra track to the 1999 remaster of In the Street. In 1984, the group sang background vocals on a disco version of "Where The Boys Are" by Lorna Luft.

Their next album, the 1985 dance/Hi-NRG release Sex Over the Phone, was not a huge commercial success, but it fared better in sales and club play than Renaissance. The title track, when released as a single, was banned by the BBC because of its subject matter, credit-card phone sex. Despite this, it did peak at 59 on the UK singles chart. The album featured yet another new lead singer, Ray Stephens (of The Great Space Coaster fame). It was the group's last album of new material until A Village People Christmas in 2018. Py Douglas came in to sub for Stephens for some of the group's live appearances in 1985 and can be seen in both promotional videos made for the group.

Afterwards, the group took a hiatus.

=== 1987–2017 (Sixuvus Ltd) ===
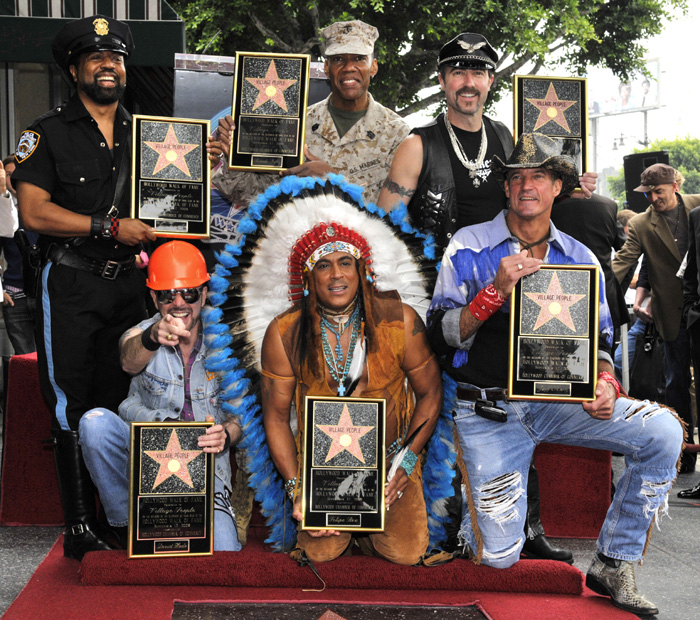
Village People receive their star on the Hollywood Walk of Fame in 2008. Left to right – front row: David Hodo, Felipe Rose, Jeff Olson / back row: Ray Simpson, Alex Briley, Eric Anzalone

The band returned in 1987 with the line-up of Randy Jones, David Hodo, Felipe Rose, Glenn Hughes, Alex Briley, and Ray Simpson, and formed Sixuvus Ltd, a group that managed the affairs of the group and had the license to use the name Village People and its characters in use until 2017.

The 1990s brought a resurgence for the Village People. On September 22, 1991, they performed in front of 41,815 in Sydney, Australia, as part of the pre-game entertainment for the New South Wales Rugby League Grand Final held at the Sydney Football Stadium. They held a free concert in the summer of 1992 at Rye Playland Park in Rye NY. They also performed a medley of self-parody songs at the MTV Movie Awards – "In the Movies" ("In the Navy"), "Psycho Bitch" ("Macho Man"), and "My MTV" ("Y.M.C.A."). The group also made a guest appearance on the hit show Married... with Children in the episode "Take My Wife, Please".

Founder Jacques Morali died of complications related to AIDS in Paris on November 15, 1991. Three years later, the Village People recorded with the Germany national football team on its official World Cup '94 song Far Away in America. In 1995, Eric Anzalone replaced Glenn Hughes as the Leatherman/Biker, and made his music video debut with Kelsey Grammer, Rob Schneider and other cast members during the end-credits of the film Down Periscope, performing "In The Navy" with Ray Simpson on lead vocals.

At the beginning of the 21st century, Village People released two singles, "Gunbalanya" (2000) and "Loveship 2001" (2001), under the name "Amazing Veepers". It was reported in 2001 that 'Gunbalanya', which was recorded with indigenous Australian people, took its title from a word meaning "in the tribe", even though it is in fact the name of an Aboriginal settlement. Leatherman/Biker Glenn Hughes died of lung cancer in New York City on March 4, 2001. Village People performed as the opening act for Cher on her Farewell Tour until it ended in April 2005. Former cowboy Randy Jones would later marry Will Grega, his boyfriend of 20 years.

Later in the 2000s, Village People continued to make appearances worldwide. The original lead singer and "cop", Victor Willis, was arrested on drug- and weapon-related charges. On September 12, 2008, Village People received a star on the Hollywood Walk of Fame. Willis was not in attendance at the ceremony. Willis gave his first live concert in 28 years in Las Vegas on August 3, 2007, and married Karen, a lawyer and executive, later that year. In May 2012, Willis won a landmark ruling in the first case heard regarding the Copyright Act of 1976, which allows recording artists and writers to reclaim their master recordings and publishing rights initially granted to record companies and publishers after 35 years. He recaptured copyrights including "Y.M.C.A.", "Go West", "Magic Night", "Milkshake", and "In the Navy". Willis also began to recapture his 33% share of songs he co-wrote.

In August 2013, Village People released a new song, "Let's Go Back to the Dance Floor", written by Harry W. Casey of K.C. and the Sunshine Band. Jim Newman joined the group as the Cowboy, and in October 2013, Bill Whitefield joined as the Construction Worker, a role he had filled in for the group over the years (for David Hodo, who had retired). Continuing his legal quest, Willis reclaimed ownership of "Y.M.C.A." and other songs written with Jacques Morali with the removal of Henri Belolo, previously credited as a third writer. In 2015, Victor Willis would release Solo Man, an album he recorded in 1979 featuring the Village People band. Willis appeared as himself on the game show To Tell the Truth and performed "Y.M.C.A." the following year.

Village People continued to make television appearances, such as performing "Y.M.C.A." during halftime of the Chicago Bulls game as part of '70s Night. They also appeared in several commercials, including a LetGo commercial that aired during the 2016 Summer Olympics, and a series of commercials for YOPA online estate agents in the UK.

=== 2017–2026 (Victor Willis' return and death) ===
In 2017, after years of legal battles over royalties and songwriting credits, Victor Willis and Can't Stop Productions settled their differences. This resulted in Willis obtaining the license to use the name and characters of Village People and returning as lead singer with a new group of background singers, while Sixuvus Ltd, which had been performing as Village People since 1987 and included original members Felipe Rose and Alex Briley, had its licence terminated. The trademark "Village People" then became the subject of litigation, but in 2018, the US District Court denied Sixuvus' preliminary injunction and ruled that only Willis's group was entitled to use the Village People trademark. Original member Rose launched his solo career and released the single "Going Back to My Roots" (a cover of the 1977 Odyssey dance hit), which won an award for Best Dance Record at the 2018 Native American Music Awards.

The rebranded group's first appearance was at the third annual Streamy Awards. Shortly after, G.I./Sailor Sonny Earl was replaced by Atlanta native James Lee, who filled in for Earl on more shows than he performed. In November 2018, Village People released their first studio album in 33 years, A Village People Christmas.

On August 3, 2019, Village People co-creator Henri Belolo died aged 82. On November 4, 2019, the group's Christmas album was re-released as Magical Christmas and included two additional tracks. On December 21, 2019, the group released its first Christmas single, "Happiest Time of the Year". On December 31, Village People performed live in Times Square on Fox's New Year's Eve with Steve Harvey and broke a world record for attendees doing the Y.M.C.A. dance (a record formerly held by the previous touring group).

On April 21, 2020, the group released a new single, "If You Believe", which hit No. 25 on Billboard's Adult Contemporary chart. This was the first Top 25 hit for the group in 40 years. On June 9, Victor Willis demanded that President Donald Trump not use Village People music at his rallies, in particular "Macho Man" and "Y.M.C.A." On September 11 that same year, it was reported that Willis said he was okay with him using "Y.M.C.A" at his campaign rallies. On September 22, the group was confirmed to be featured in the song "My Agenda" from the Dorian Electra album My Agenda (2020). On October 24, Saturday Night Live performed a parody of the group's reaction to Donald Trump's use of their music at his rallies. On October 30, Willis clarified his and the group's position against Trump's use of his music at his rallies. On November 7, supporters of President-elect Joe Biden in Philadelphia celebrated his victory in the state of Pennsylvania by dancing in the streets and singing "Y.M.C.A."

Mark Lee, former "construction worker" between 1982 and 1985, died in April 2021.

In November 2022, a third single, "Magic Christmas", was released from the group's Magical Christmas album and entered the Billboard a/c chart at No. 23, the highest chart entry for any Village People single.

In January 2025, it was announced that Willis and the Village People would be performing at the Turning Point USA inaugural ball in celebration of Trump's second inauguration. On January 19, 2025, Village People performed "Y.M.C.A." on Trump's pre-inauguration rally, titled "Make America Great Again Victory Rally", at the Capital One Arena, the most high-profile of three inauguration week performances.

Willis died on June 30, 2026, at the age of 74.

== In popular culture ==
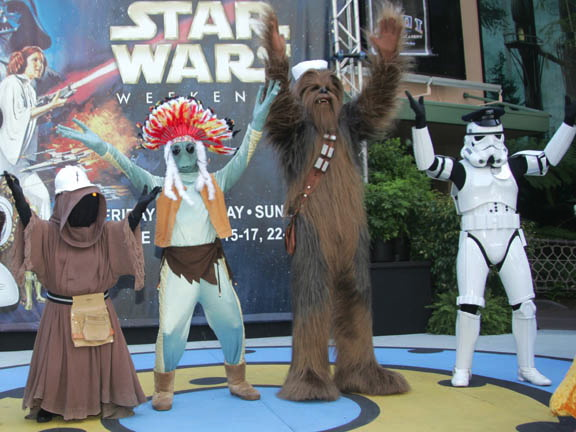
Star Wars characters, a Jawa, Greedo, Chewbacca and an Imperial Stormtrooper, assume the roles of the Village People for the "Y.M.C.A." dance at a Disney "Star Wars Weekends" event in 2007

Due to their easily recognizable characters, the group have frequently been imitated and parodied in movies, television series, video games and music. Numerous covers and homages of their songs have been recorded. Examples of homages and parody include an episode of the 1990s CGI show ReBoot, a scene in the 1993 film Wayne's World 2, a mention in the 1991 comedy City Slickers, a 1993 episode of Married... with Children, the 1997 video for U2's single "Discothèque", a 2000 episode of 3rd Rock from the Sun, and the 2013 animated film Despicable Me 2.

The leather-clad biker character with a horseshoe mustache has also become a widespread pop culture icon associated with gay culture, and "Y.M.C.A." has become an anthem of the LGBTQ community. According to Jack Fritscher, Jacques Morali drew his inspiration for the character from the dress code of the gay BDSM leather bar and sex club The Mineshaft. Leather man Hughes frequented the club.

In AllMusic's entry on the group, Ron Wynn summarized them as "part clever concept, part exaggerated camp act" who were "worldwide sensations during disco's heyday and keep reviving like the phoenix." Village Voice critic Robert Christgau originally found the group to be a humorous annoyance, but warmed to their music after listening to the 1978 album Cruisin'; he wrote in Christgau's Record Guide: Rock Albums of the Seventies (1981): "I give up—I've never been capable of resisting music this silly. At least this time they're not singing the praises of 'macho,' a term whose backlash resurgence is no laughing matter, and the gay stereotyping—right down to 'The Women,' every one a camp heroine of screen or disc—is so cartoonish that I can't imagine anyone taking it seriously. As for all the straights who think 'Y.M.C.A.' is about playing basketball, well, that's pretty funny too."

The importance of Village People to the history of disco music is explored in episode 3 of the 2024 PBS series Disco: Soundtrack of a Revolution.

VH1 placed "Y.M.C.A." at #7 on their list of "100 Greatest Dance Songs" in 2000, while Paste Magazine ranked the song #1 on their list of "The 60 Best Dancefloor Classics" in February 2017. In 2022, Rolling Stone ranked it #139 in their list of "200 Greatest Dance Songs of All Time." In 2024, Billboard placed "Y.M.C.A." at #61 on their list of "The 100 Greatest Jock Jams of All Time".

Village People recorded a version of the song for Pepsi in 1997 for a commercial featuring a group of dancing bears, changing the lyrics to match the drink and spelling out P-E-P-S-I. A few months afterwards, Pepsi used the song again as part of its new blue-themed imaging for the Pepsi Globe. In September 2000 "Y.M.C.A." was used as the Space Shuttle wake-up call on day 11 of STS-106. On December 31, 2008, "Y.M.C.A." set a Guinness World Record when 40,148 people danced to Village People's live performance of the song at the 2008 Sun Bowl game in El Paso, Texas.

In 2001 it was part of the "Swamp Karaoke Dance Party" in Shrek (2001) performed by Monsieur Hood and the Merry Men.

In 2012, in a landmark ruling in accordance with the Copyright Act of 1976, Willis terminated his copyrights granted to the publishers Can't Stop Productions and Scorpio Music. In March 2015, it was determined that the sole writers of the song were Morali and Willis.

In March 2020, the US Library of Congress added the song to its National Recording Registry, which preserves for posterity audio that is "culturally, historically or aesthetically significant". In December 2020, "Y.M.C.A." was inducted into the Grammy Hall of Fame.

=== Donald Trump ===
U.S. president Donald Trump began using "Y.M.C.A." (as well as another Village People song, "Macho Man") to close out his rallies during his 2020 re-election campaign. Willis initially approved its use but after several incidents involving the Black Lives Matter protests, he demanded Trump stop, although he later relaxed his stance. Saturday Night Live parodied the song and the group's reaction with a "cease and desist" on the October 24, 2020 segment of Weekend Update. As a result, the song was back in the Top 20 on iTunes in November 2020 and hit the #2 spot on the Billboard Dance Digital Song Sales chart. On November 6, following the media's declaration that Joe Biden had taken the lead in Pennsylvania over Trump in the 2020 presidential election, Biden supporters celebrated by dancing in the streets and singing the song across the city of Philadelphia. The song was played over loudspeakers as Trump boarded Air Force One on January 20, 2021, en route to Florida before Biden's inauguration.

In his 2024 presidential campaign, Trump once again used the song at his rallies, usually performing his signature dance while it played. Willis lamented his use of the song since 2020 and even considered a lawsuit to block Trump from using it, but ultimately decided there was "not much he can do about it" and decided it was "beneficial" to have the song back on the charts, stating it was "good for business."

In January 2025, Village People performed the song at several events for Trump's second inauguration.

== Controversy ==
=== Soviet ban ===
In 1985—two months before Mikhail Gorbachev became premier—the Soviet communist party's youth wing distributed a secret blacklist of artists and songs to bureaucrats. The list included, among many others, the Village People, as their songs were considered ideologically harmful. This list categorized the Village People's music as "violent".

=== Gay anthem denial ===
At the end of 2024, band member Victor Willis alleged to news media that the group's hit song "Y.M.C.A." was not a gay anthem and threatened to sue "each and every news organization" that would refer to the song as such. He did add "However, I don’t mind that gays think of the song as their anthem."

== Lineup ==
=== Current members ===
- J. J. Lippold – leather man (2017–present)
- James Kwong – construction worker (2017–present)
- James Lee – GI (2018–present; fill-in 2017–2018)
- Nicholas Manelick – cowboy (2020–present)
- Javier Perez – Indian (2023–present)

=== Former members ===
- Victor Willis – cop/admiral (1977–1979, 1981–1982, 2017–2026) his death
- Felipe Rose – Indian (1977–1985, 1987–2017)
- Alex Briley – GI (1977–1985, 1987–2017)
- Lee Mouton – leather man (1977)
- Mark Mussler – construction worker (1977) (died 1987)
- David Forrest – cowboy (1977)
- Glenn Hughes – leather man (1977–1985, 1987–1995) (died 2001)
- David Hodo – construction worker (1977–1982, 1987–2013)
- Randy Jones – cowboy (1977–1981, 1987–1990)
- Ray Simpson – cop/admiral (1979–1982, 1987–2017)
- Jeff Olson – cowboy (1981–1985, 1990–2013)
- Miles Jaye – cop/admiral (1982–1984)
- Mark Lee – construction worker (1982–1984) (died 2021)
- Ray Stephens – cop/admiral (1984–1985) (died 1990)
- Eric Anzalone – leather man (1995–2017)
- Bill Whitefield – construction worker (2013–2017)
- Jim Newman – cowboy (2013–2017)
- Chad Freeman – cowboy (2017–2020)
- Angel Morales – Indian (2017–2020; fill-in 2008–2010)
- Sonny Earl – GI (2017–2018)
- Isaac Lopez – Indian (2020–2023)

=== Temporary members ===
- Py Douglas – cop/admiral (1985)
- Alec Timerman (2001–2003)
- Richard Montoya (2008)
- Ray Rodriguez – Indian (2011–2013)
- Stephen Hewitt – Indian (2013)
- A. J. Perrelli – cowboy (2013; died 2013)
- Pacho Andrews – Indian (2013)
- Nate Lark – cop/admiral (2025–present)

=== Lineups ===
Years	Costumes					
Years	Cop/admiral	Indian	GI	Leather man	Construction worker	Cowboy
1977	Victor Willis	Felipe Rose	Alex Briley	Lee Mouton	Mark Mussler	David Forrest
1977–1979	Victor Willis	Felipe Rose	Alex Briley	Glenn Hughes	David Hodo	Randy Jones
1979–1981	Ray Simpson	Felipe Rose	Alex Briley	Glenn Hughes	David Hodo	Randy Jones
1981–1982	Victor Willis/Ray Simpson	Felipe Rose	Alex Briley	Glenn Hughes	David Hodo	Jeff Olson
1982–1984	Miles Jaye	Felipe Rose	Alex Briley	Glenn Hughes	Mark Lee	Jeff Olson
1984–1985	Ray Stephens	Felipe Rose	Alex Briley	Glenn Hughes	Mark Lee	Jeff Olson
1987–1990	Ray Simpson	Felipe Rose	Alex Briley	Glenn Hughes	David Hodo	Randy Jones
1990–1995	Ray Simpson	Felipe Rose	Alex Briley	Glenn Hughes	David Hodo	Jeff Olson
1995–2013	Ray Simpson	Felipe Rose	Alex Briley	Eric Anzalone	David Hodo	Jeff Olson
2013–2017	Ray Simpson	Felipe Rose	Alex Briley	Eric Anzalone	Bill Whitefield	Jim Newman
2017–2018	Victor Willis	Angel Morales	Sonny Earl	J. J. Lippold	James Kwong	Chad Freeman
2018–2020	Victor Willis	Angel Morales	James Lee	J. J. Lippold	James Kwong	Chad Freeman
2020–2023	Victor Willis	Isaac Lopez	James Lee	J. J. Lippold	James Kwong	Nicholas Manelick
2023–2026	Victor Willis	Javier Perez	James Lee	J. J. Lippold	James Kwong	Nicholas Manelick
2026–present	TBA	Javier Perez	James Lee	J. J. Lippold	James Kwong	Nicholas Manelick

== Discography ==
- Village People (1977)
- Macho Man (1978)
- Cruisin' (1978)
- Go West (1979)
- Live and Sleazy (1979)
- Can't Stop the Music (1980)
- Renaissance (1981)
- Fox on the Box (1982)
- Sex Over the Phone (1985)
- A Village People Christmas (2018)

== Filmography ==
- Can't Stop the Music (1980)

== See also ==
- List of artists who reached number one in Ireland
- List of artists who reached number one on the US Dance chart
- List of number-one dance hits (United States)
