= Horseshoe moustache =

Type of moustache

"Horseshoe" moustache style

A horseshoe moustache, also known as a biker moustache, is a full moustache with vertical extensions grown on the corners of the lips and down the sides of the mouth to the jawline, resembling an upside-down U or a horseshoe. The whiskers grown along the sides of the mouth in the horseshoe are sometimes referred to as "pipes".

The horseshoe is not to be confused with the Fu Manchu, which is grown only from the upper lip while the sides remain shaven.

== Gallery ==
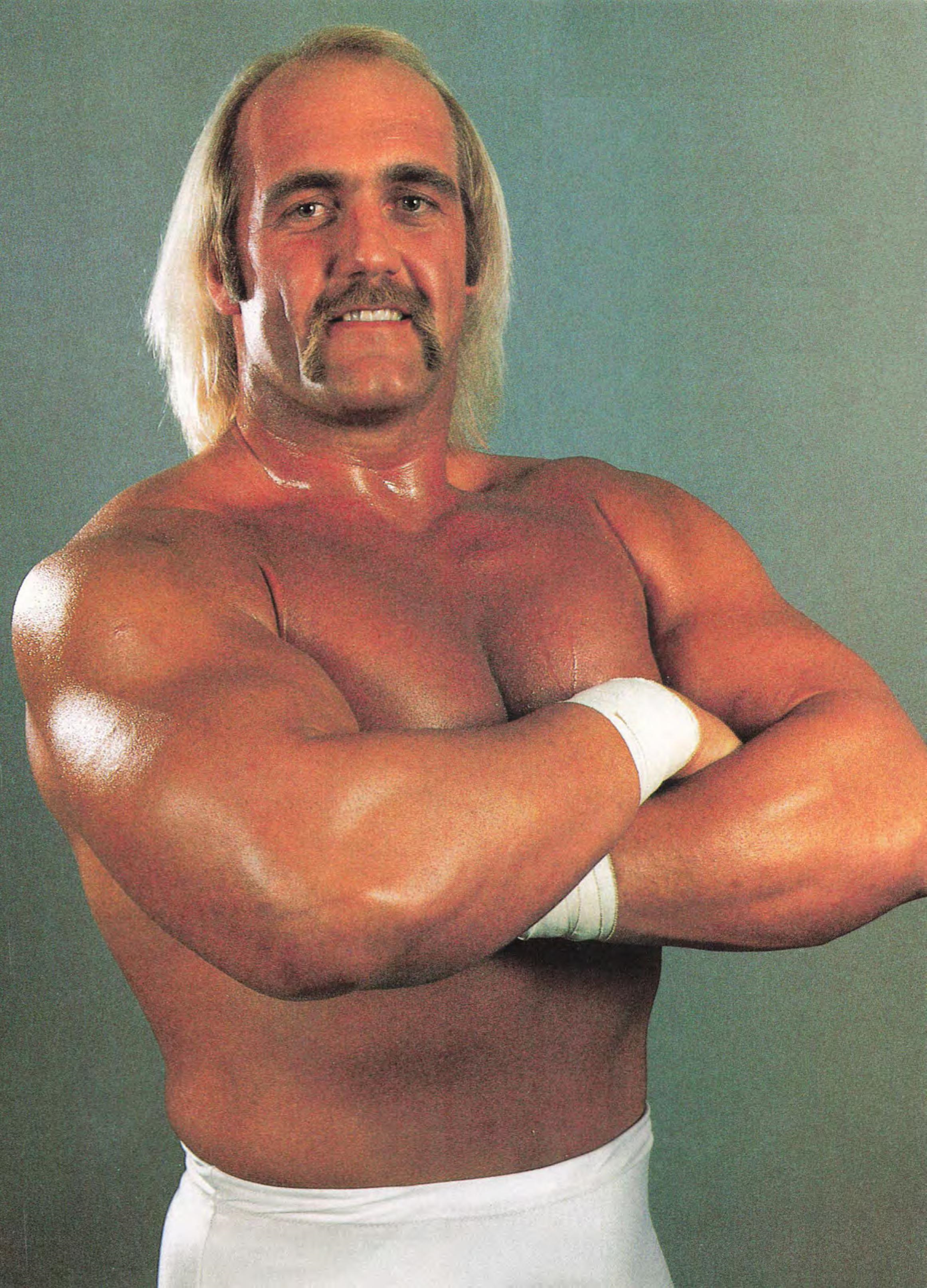
Professional wrestler Hulk Hogan

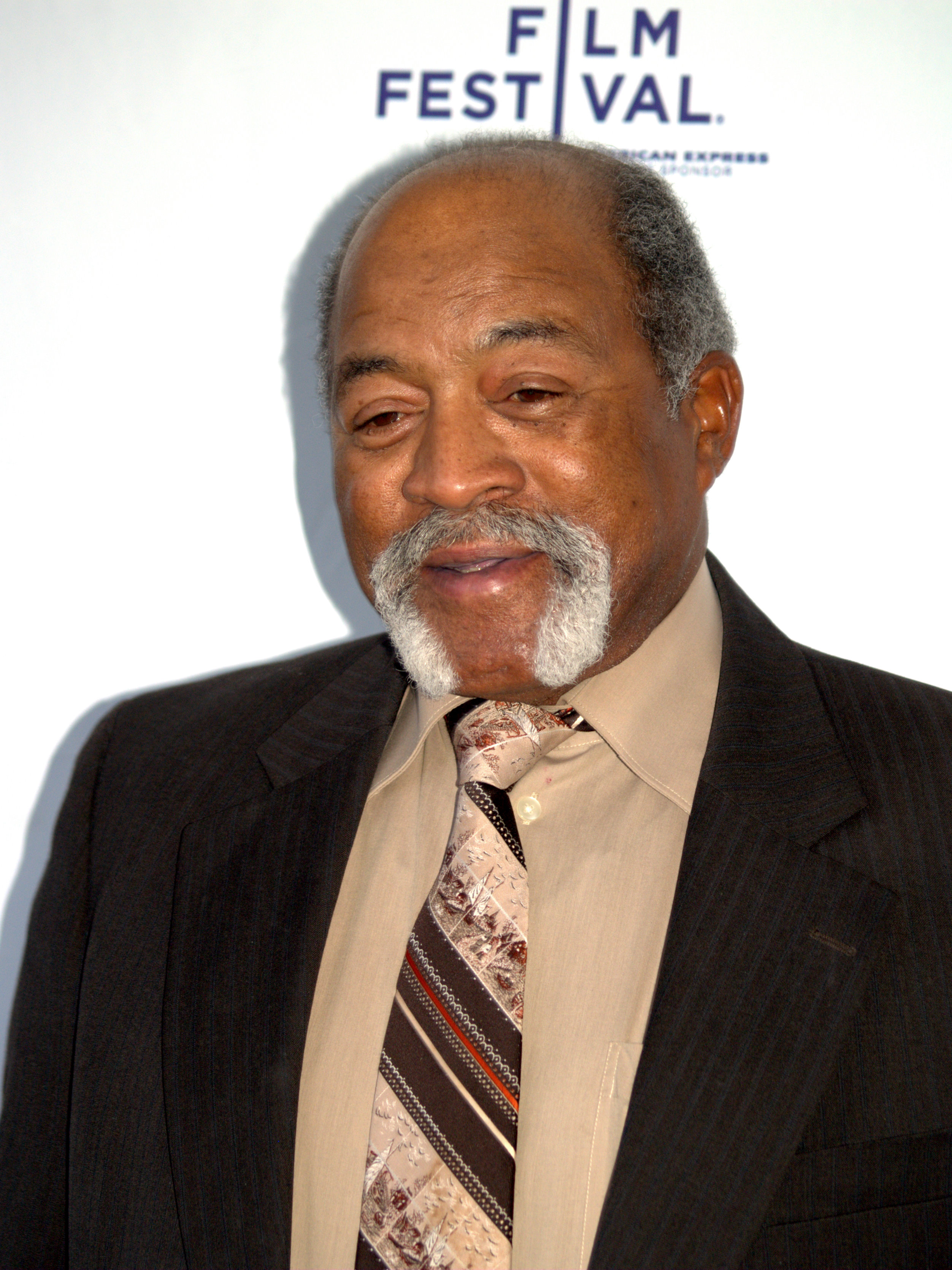
Baseball player Luis Tiant

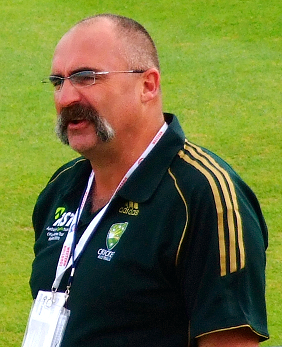
Cricket bowler Merv Hughes

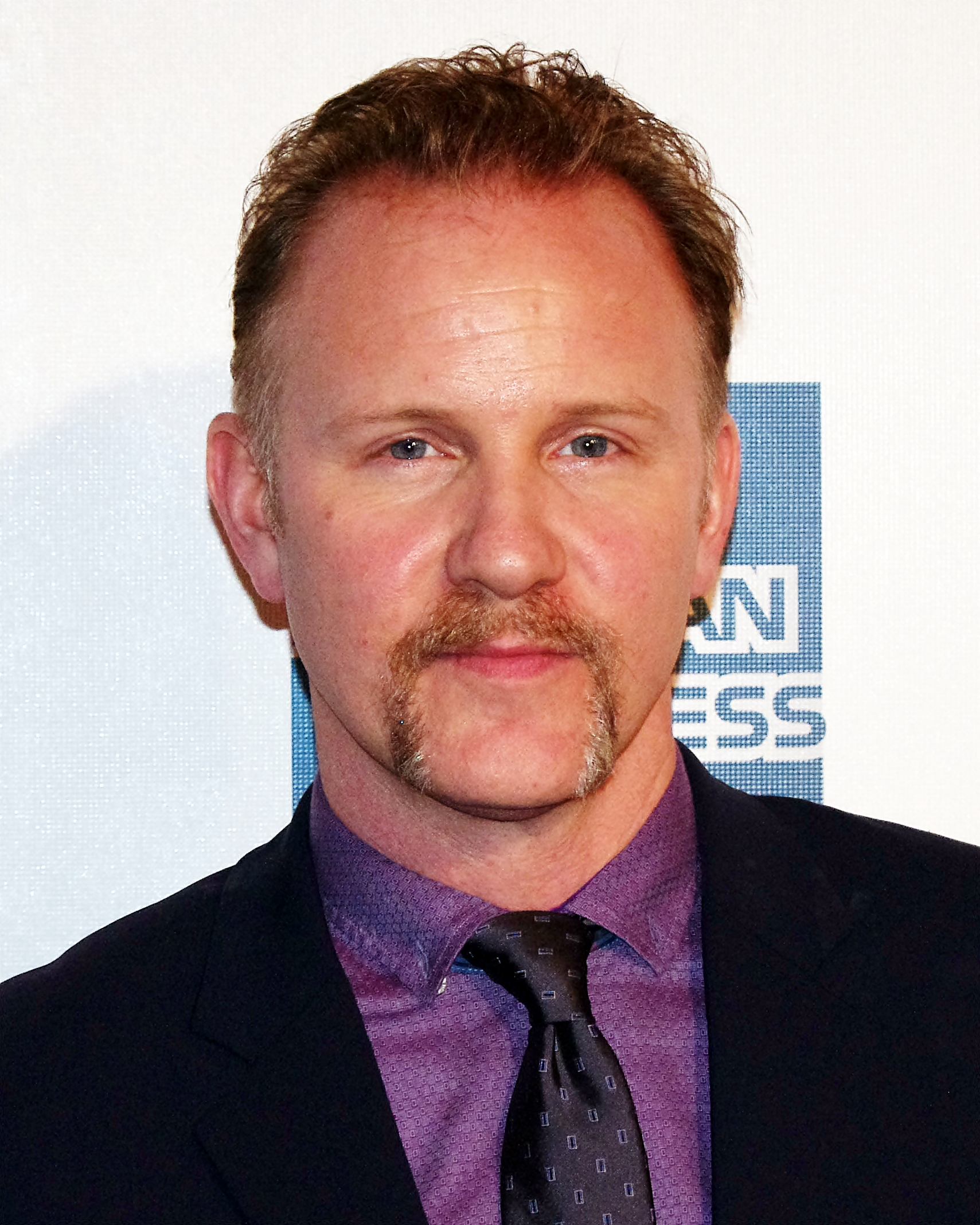
Documentary filmmaker Morgan Spurlock

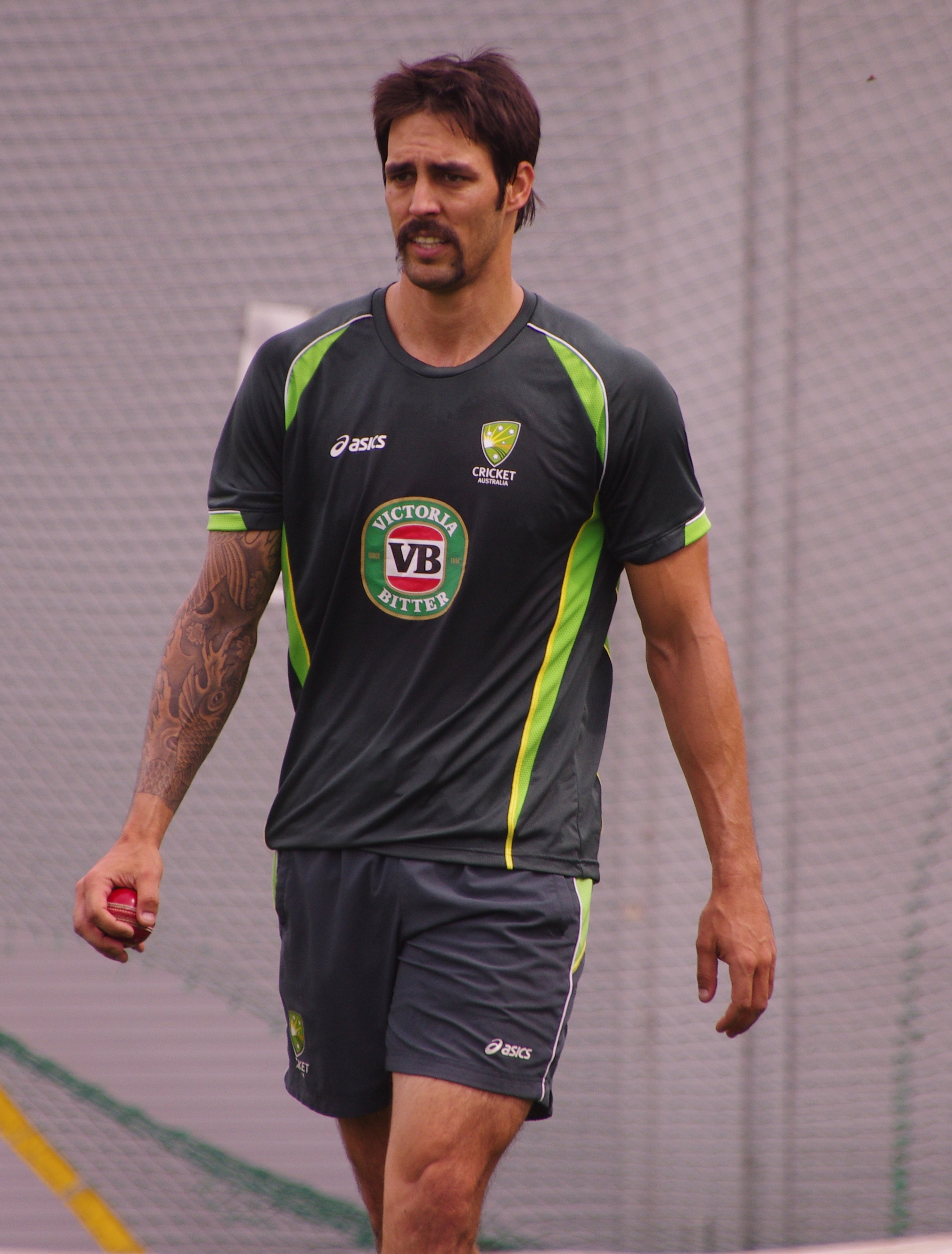
Cricket player Mitchell Johnson

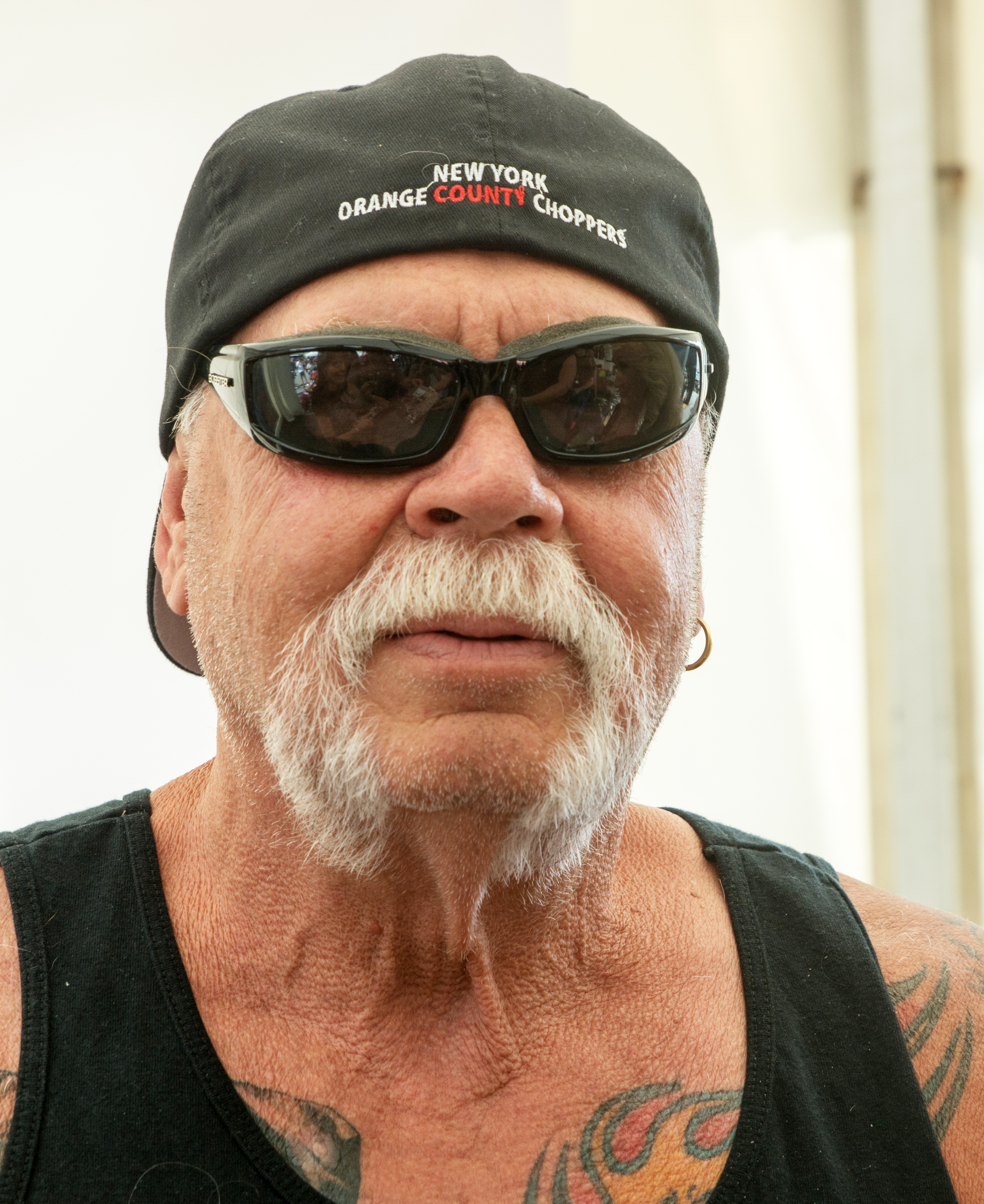
Motorcycle designer and television personality Paul Teutul Sr.

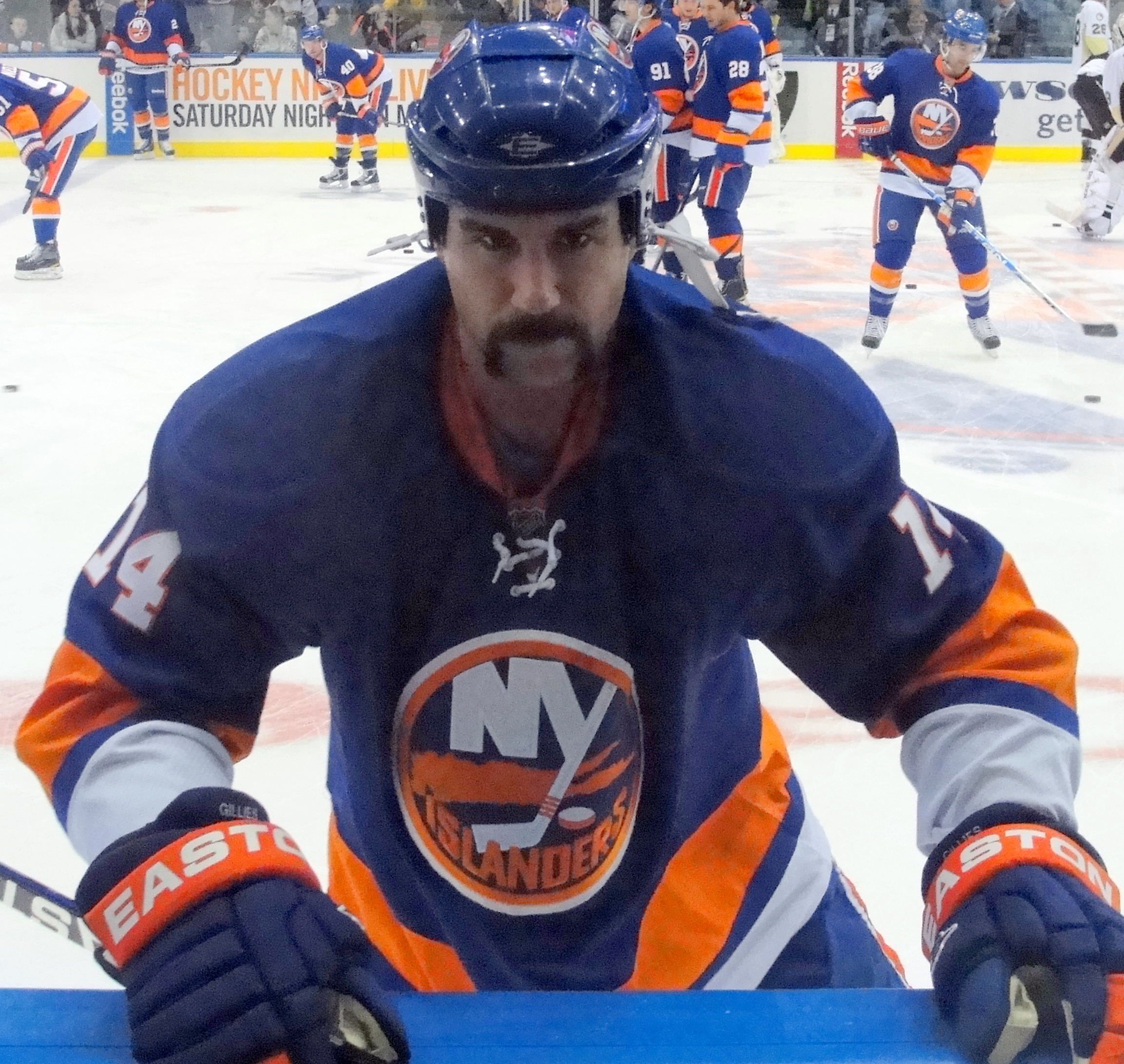
Ice hockey player Trevor Gillies

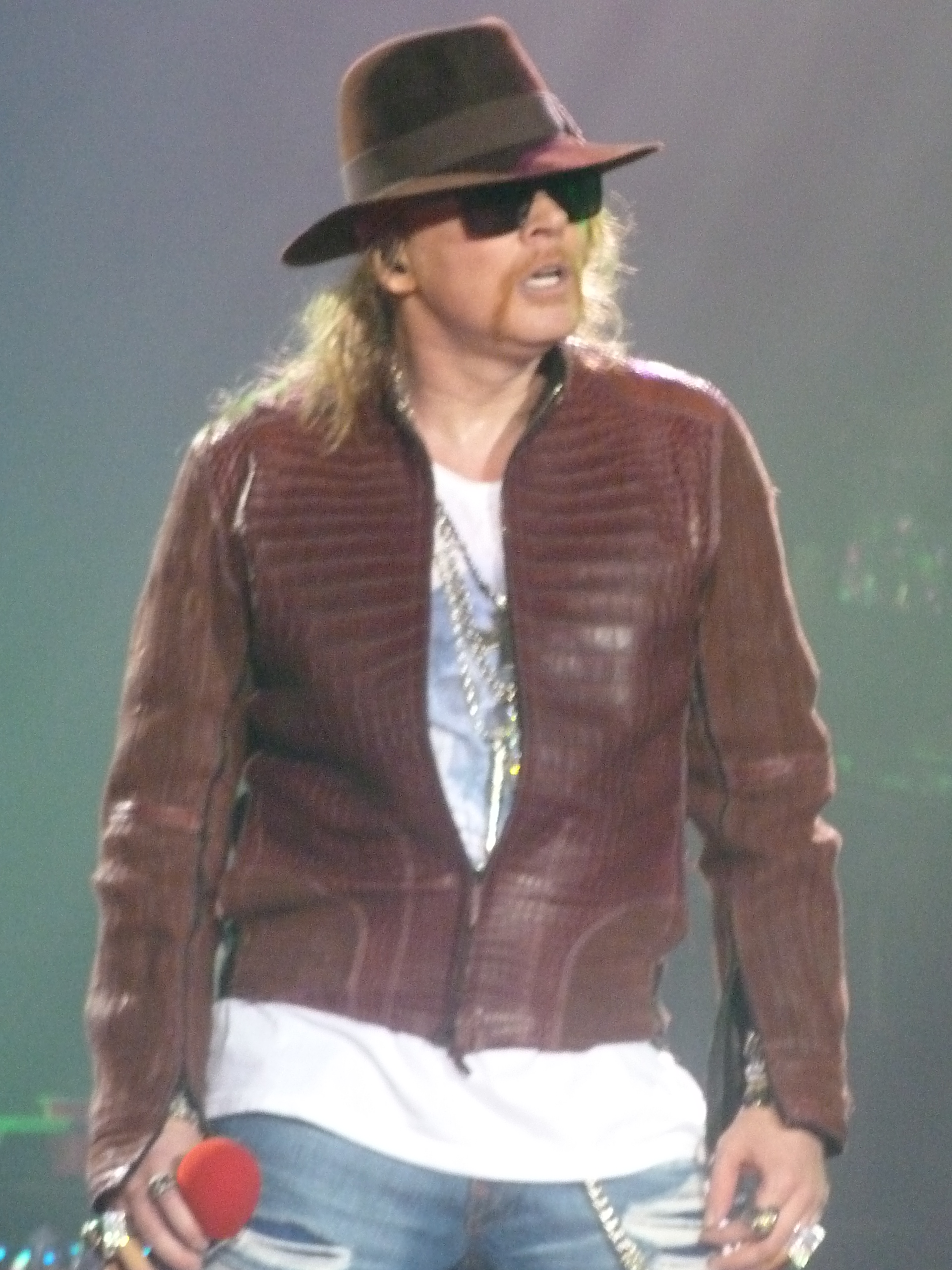
Guns N' Roses lead vocalist Axl Rose

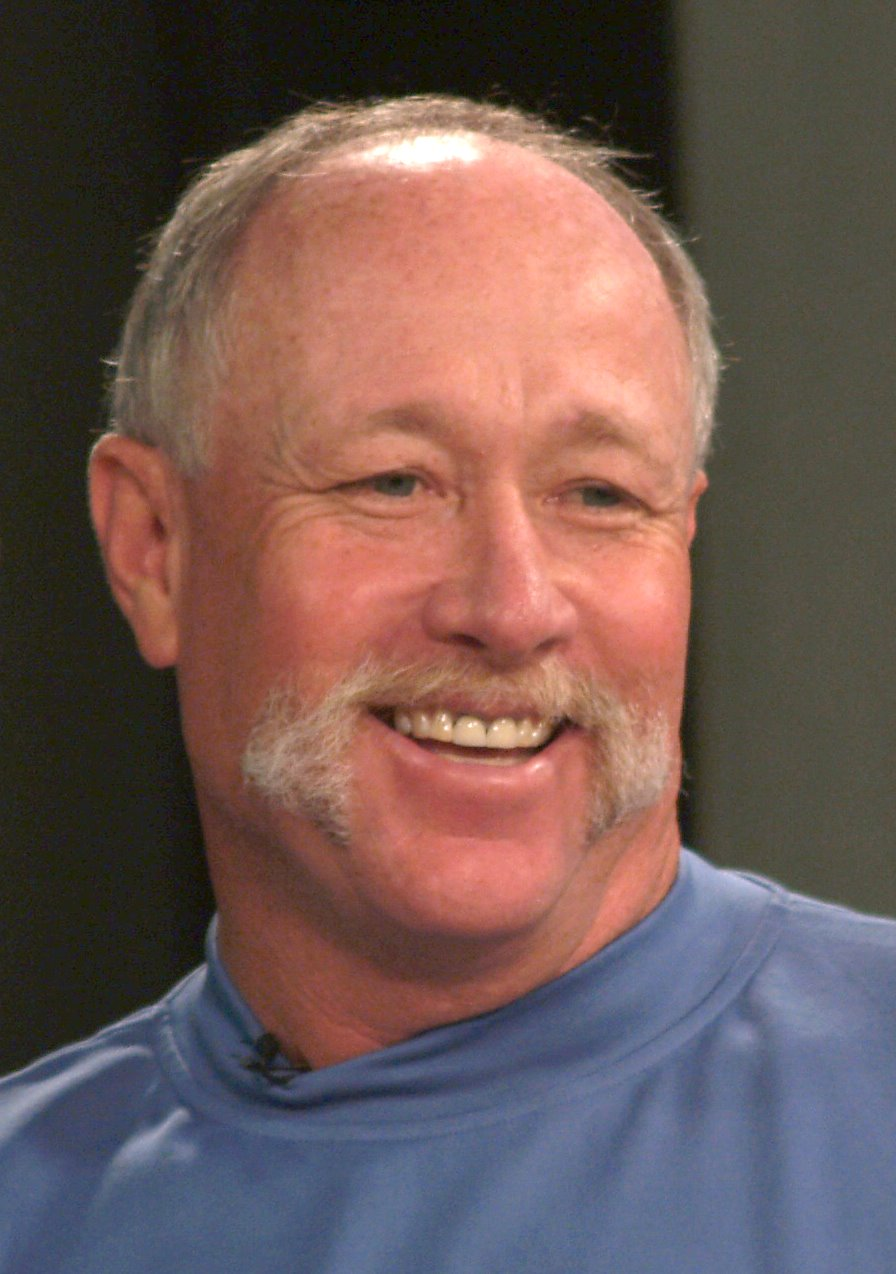
Hall of Fame Baseball player Goose Gossage

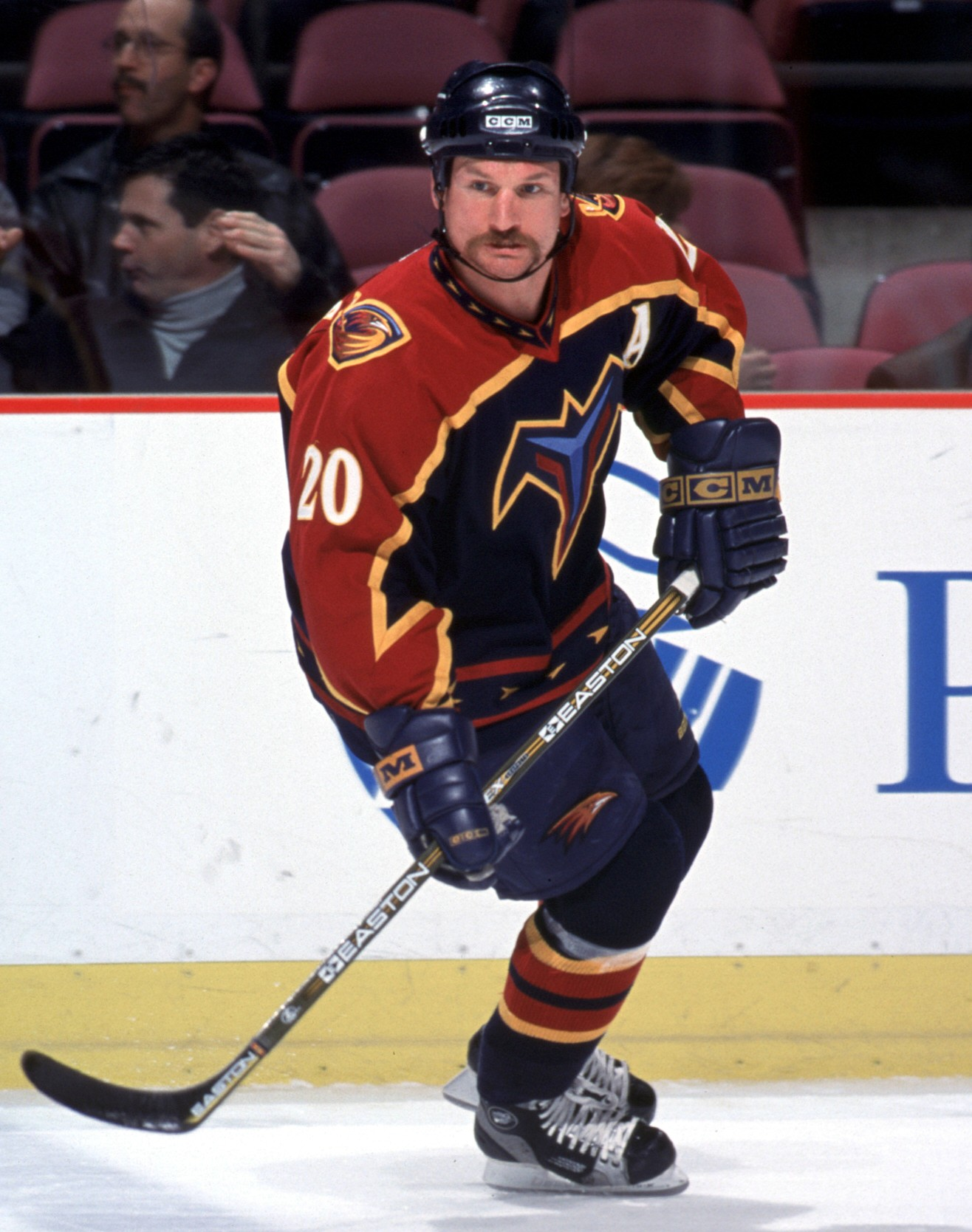
Ice hockey player Jeff Odgers

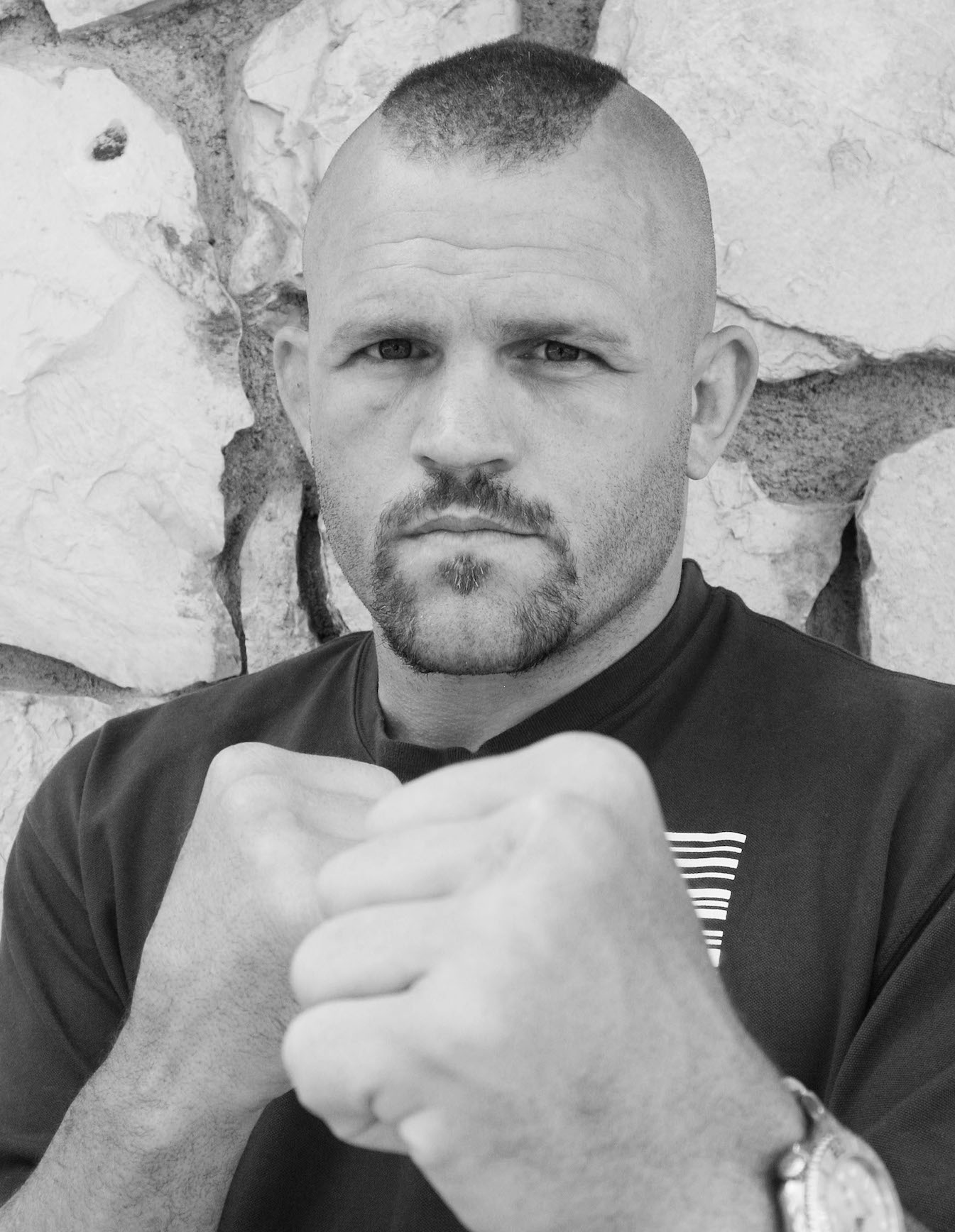
Mixed martial artist Chuck Liddell

== See also ==
- List of moustache styles
- List of facial hairstyles
