= Glenn Hughes (American singer) =

American singer (1950–2001)

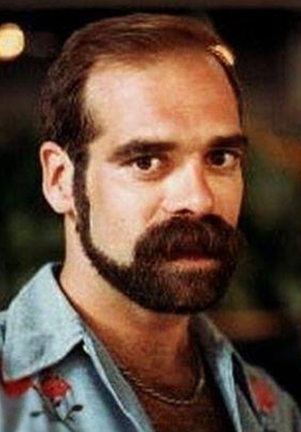

Background information
- Born: Glenn Michael Hughes; July 18, 1950; New York City, U.S.
- Died: March 4, 2001 (aged 50) New York City, U.S.
- Genres: Disco; funk; R&B
- Occupation: Singer
- Years active: 1968–1996
- Formerly of: Village People

Glenn Michael Hughes (July 18, 1950 – March 4, 2001) was an American singer who was the original "Leatherman" character in the disco group Village People from 1977 to 1996.

== Early life ==
Hughes grew up in The Bronx. Hughes graduated in 1968 from Chaminade High School, in Mineola on Long Island, New York. He later attended Manhattan University, where he was initiated as a member of Phi Mu Alpha Sinfonia music fraternity in 1969.

== Career ==
Hughes was interested in motorcycles, and was working as a toll collector at the Brooklyn–Battery Tunnel when he was dared by his coworkers to respond to an advertisement by composer Jacques Morali seeking "macho" singers and dancers. Hughes and other members of the band were given a crash course in the synchronised dance choreography that later typified the group's live performances.

Hughes sported an extravagant horseshoe moustache and wore his trademark leather outfit on and off stage and became one of the iconic figures of the disco era. According to Jack Fritscher, Jacques Morali drew his inspiration for the character from the gay BDSM leather bar and sex club of the Mineshaft's dress code. Hughes frequented the club. He was a bike fanatic in real life and kept his motorcycle parked inside his house.

Hughes was named on People's 1979 list of 'Most Beautiful People' and appeared in the television special Magic Night at the Playboy Mansion with Hugh Hefner.

In 1996, Hughes retired from the group and launched a successful New York cabaret act until he was diagnosed with lung cancer. He had been a heavy smoker since he was a teenager. He was replaced by Eric Anzalone though continued with management of the band.

== Death ==
Hughes died on March 4, 2001, at his Manhattan apartment from lung cancer, aged 50. He was subsequently interred wearing his leatherman outfit at Saint Charles Cemetery in Farmingdale, New York.
