= Alex Briley =

American singer (born 1947)

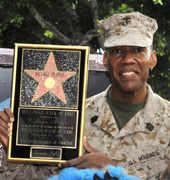
- Briley in 2008, when the Village People were granted a star on the Hollywood Walk of Fame

Background information
- Born: Alexander Briley
- Occupation: Singer
- Years active: 1977–present
- Formerly of: Village People

Alexander Briley is an American singer who was the original "G.I." in the disco recording act Village People.

== Biography ==
Briley is the son of a Christian minister. He had two brothers, Timothy and Jonathan. Jonathan Briley was a victim of the September 11 attacks, who worked as a sound engineer at the Windows on the World restaurant in the North Tower of the World Trade Center.

Briley was working in off-Broadway productions when he was asked to join Village People by Victor Willis, whom he met in a New York nightclub. He joined the group and wore military uniforms as his stage attire. Each member of the band dresses as a stereotype, and Briley's was that of a military man. He dressed in Army, Navy, and Marine uniforms.

After a brief hiatus in 1985, Briley and some of the original Village People reformed the group in 1987, and with it formed Sixuvus Ltd, a group that managed and licensed the Village People name. By 2017, Briley was still touring with original Native American Felipe Rose, when Willis obtained full rights of the Village People name, and fired all the members and formed a new lineup led by him, with Sixuvus' rights to the name terminated.

Following the change in Village People's lineup and management, Briley and most of the other members of the recently fired lineup formed a new group, a disco tribute act, originally called "Kings of Disco featuring former members of The Village People", before its name changed to "When Disco Was King".
