= Ray Simpson =

American singer

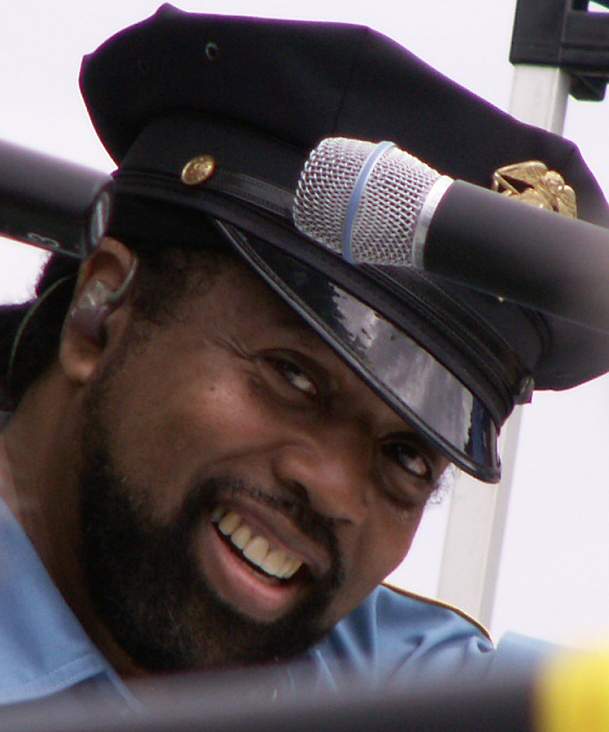
- Simpson in 2006

Background information
- Born: January 15, 1954 (age 72); The Bronx, New York City, New York, United States
- Genres: R&B; disco; funk
- Occupations: Singer; songwriter
- Instrument: Vocals
- Years active: 1979–present
- Formerly of: Village People

Ray Simpson (born January 15, 1954) is an American singer best known as a former lead singer and "Cop" of the disco super-group Village People, having been in that role for over 30 years. In August 1979, he replaced original lead singer, Victor Willis as the Cop, a role he would fill until 1982, and again from 1987 until Willis' return in 2017. Simpson had been performing backup singing for Village People in its first years, which is why he was recruited (on very short notice) to join the group when Willis left.

Simpson was featured in the Village People film, Can't Stop the Music, released in 1980.

Born and raised in The Bronx, he is a graduate of City College of New York, majoring in English and minoring in music.

His sister, Valerie Simpson, was part of the husband-and-wife songwriting-production team and recording artists Ashford & Simpson. The duo worked with many Motown artists, most successfully with Marvin Gaye and Tammi Terrell and then Diana Ross, and with several non-Motown artists, like Chaka Khan and The Brothers Johnson. They also found success as recording artists, notably with their songs "Found A Cure" (1979) and "Solid" (1984). Ray Simpson spent many years performing with the duo. Prior to joining Village People, Simpson also released a solo recording album titled Tiger Love.

== Personal life ==
Simpson's hobbies include sports, backgammon, bicycling, writing music and driving fancy cars. He is married to Leslie, and, along with daughter Alayna, they reside in Teaneck, New Jersey.

Ray is a member of the Board of Directors of Sixuvus Ltd (the Village People corporation).
