= Randy Jones (singer) =

American disco & pop singer (born 1952)

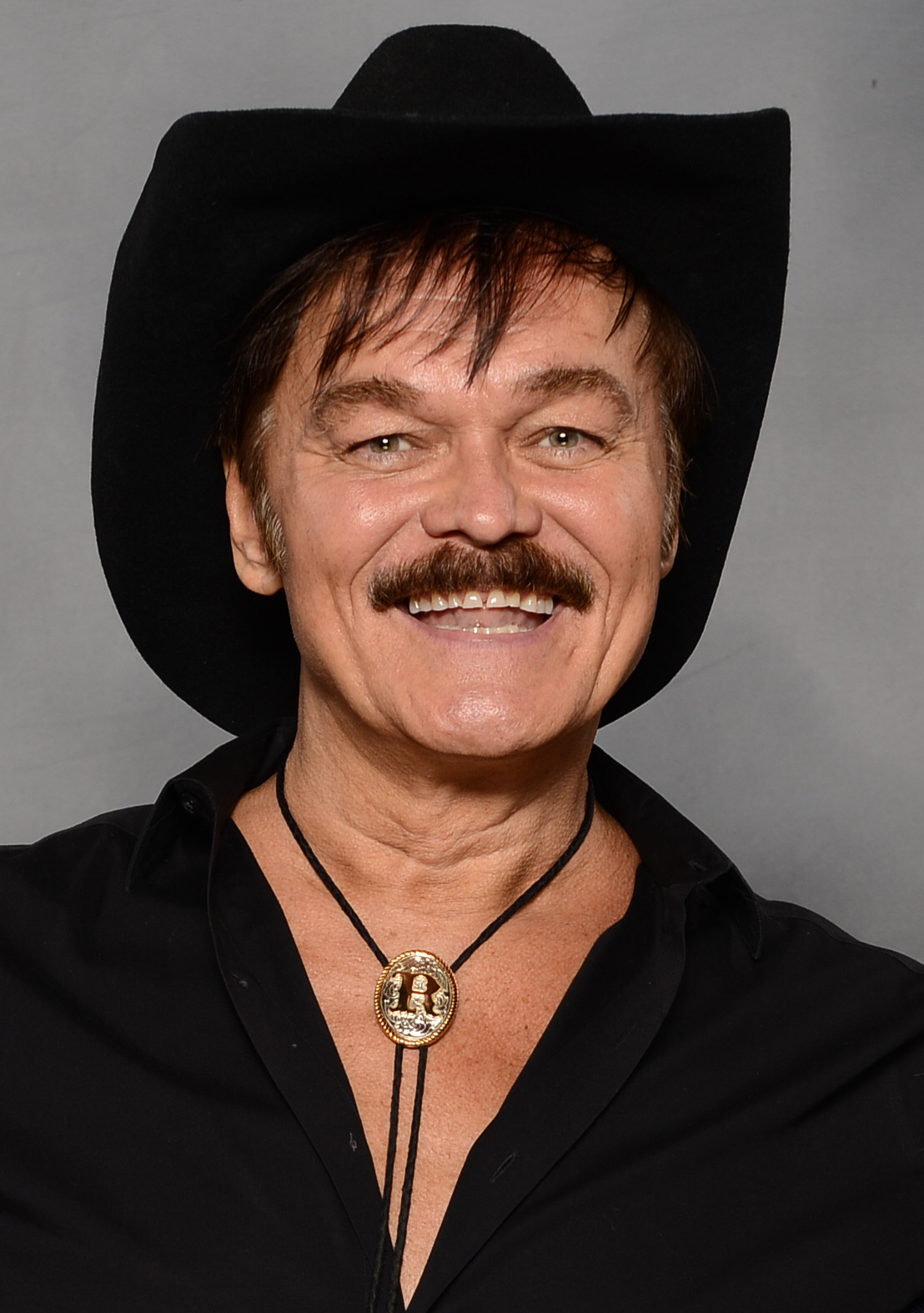
- Jones in 2017

Background information
- Born: September 13, 1952 (age 73); Raleigh, North Carolina, United States
- Genres: Disco, pop, R&B
- Occupation: Singer
- Years active: 1977–present
- Spouse: Will Grega (m. 2004)
- Website: randyjonesworld.com

Randolph Edward Jones (born September 13, 1952) is an American disco and pop singer and best known as the cowboy from Village People from 1977 to 1980, and again from 1987 until 1990.

== Early life ==
Jones attended William G. Enloe High School in Raleigh, North Carolina and graduated in 1970. While there, he was a founder of Enloe's Drama Club, which was then called Amicus Scaena, Latin for "friend of scene" or "friend of theatre". He then studied at North Carolina School of the Arts before moving to New York, joining The Village People.

== Personal life and career ==
Jones had a marriage ceremony with his partner of 20 years, Will Grega, at a New York City club on May 7, 2004. Although the marriage was not legally binding at the time, as same-sex marriage was not yet recognized in New York State, Jones commented, "It's only a matter of time before the courts rule in favor of what's morally right and humanly decent." The pair had published a book together in 1996, titled Out Sounds: The Gay and Lesbian Music Alternative.

In 2007, he released a disco and pop solo album Ticket to the World. In 2009, he appeared on Flight of the Conchords in their music video for "Too Many Dicks".

Jones appeared as himself in the 2011 video game Postal III.

In 2014, Jones appeared as Tiberius in the Off-Broadway musical, The Anthem. The production was directed and choreographed by Rachel Klein, with a book by Gary Morgenstein, lyrics by Erik Ransom, and music by Jonnie Rockwell. The production performed at the Lynn Redgrave Theatre in New York City.

In 2017, he released "Hard Times", the first single from the album Still Makin' Noise. The single reached number 42 on the Billboard Dance Club Songs chart, and was the first chart placement from any member of the Village People as a solo artist.

== Other sources ==
- Menconi, David (August 7, 2005). "The cowboy way". Raleigh News and Observer, p. G1.
