= Victor Willis =

American singer (1951–2026)

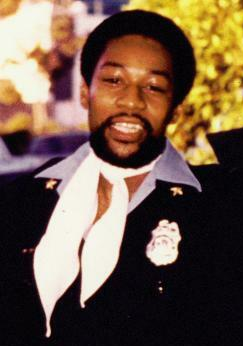
- Willis in 1978

Background information
- Born: Victor Edward Willis; July 1, 1951; Dallas, Texas, U.S.
- Died: June 30, 2026 (aged 74)
- Genres: Disco; funk; R&B
- Occupations: Singer; songwriter; actor
- Years active: 1976–2026
- Formerly of: Village People
- Website: villagepeople.com

Victor Edward Willis (July 1, 1951 – June 30, 2026) was an American singer-songwriter, who co-founded the disco group Village People. He performed as their lead singer and was co-songwriter for all of their most successful singles. In the group, Willis performed costumed as a policeman or naval officer. The son of a Baptist preacher, Willis developed his singing skills in his father's church. With training in acting and dance, Willis went to New York and joined the Negro Ensemble Company. He appeared in many musicals and plays, including the original Broadway production of The Wiz in 1976, and subsequently, the Australian production.

== Background ==
Victor Edward Willis was born on July 1, 1951, in Dallas and grew up in Haight-Ashbury, in San Francisco. His father was a Baptist minister, and Willis sang gospel music in his church before later moving into performing jazz and soul. In his teens, he performed with his band the Ballads, opening for The Temptations.

He enrolled at Antioch College in Yellow Springs, Ohio, before performing in Hair in Las Vegas. After Hair, he moved and worked on Broadway.

== Career ==
=== Village People ===
Willis wrote and recorded several albums in the mid-1970s for independent labels and eventually was introduced to French disco producer Jacques Morali. Morali, who dubbed him the "young man with the big voice", approached Willis and said, "I had a dream that you sang lead vocals on my album and it went very, very big". Willis agreed to sing lead and background vocals under the guise of Village People, at the time a non-existent concept group. The album Village People was released in July 1977, including the hits "San Francisco (You've Got Me)" and "In Hollywood (Everybody is a Star)", and became a huge hit in the burgeoning disco market. After an offer from Dick Clark for the group to perform on American Bandstand, Morali and Willis were pressed to develop a "real" group around Willis to perform live. They did so by placing an ad in music trade papers for "macho" singers who "could also dance" and "must have a mustache".

Willis soon wrote songs produced by and co-written with Morali for the group and other artists, which found success. The Village People quickly rose to the top of the charts, scoring numerous major hits such as "Macho Man", "Y.M.C.A.", "In the Navy", and "Go West". In 1980, as preparations for a Village People feature film Can't Stop the Music were underway, Willis left the group. Although he does not appear in the movie, Willis wrote the lyrics for two of the film's songs, "Magic Night" and "Milkshake". Can't Stop the Music is listed among Hollywood's bigger movie flops. After Willis departed, Village People never had another hit. In an attempt to "recapture the magic", Morali convinced Willis to return to the group in 1982 for the album Fox on the Box. The album was released a year later in the United States as In the Street. Willis left the group again in 1983. In 2013, Willis appeared on the TV One series Unsung in their two-hour special retrospective on the disco era. On June 28, 2016, he appeared as a contestant on the show To Tell the Truth, and sang "Y.M.C.A." as the credits rolled.

=== Solo career ===
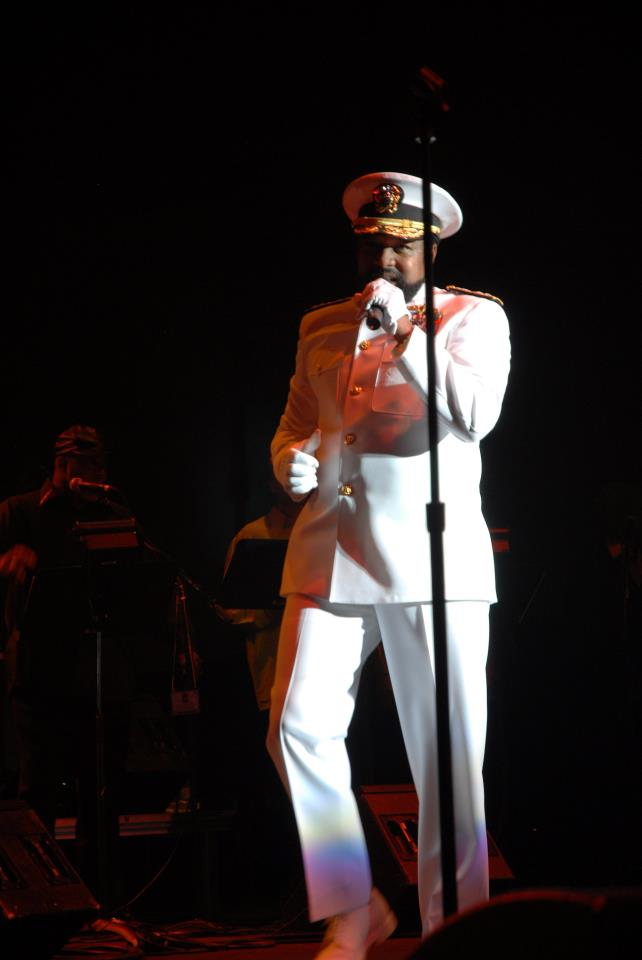
Willis performing in 2008

After leaving Village People, Willis declined offers to record and consistently refused to perform any of his Village People hits. In 2010, he appeared at several Major League Baseball stadiums, performing "The Star-Spangled Banner" and leading the crowd for the traditional "Y.M.C.A." seventh-inning stretch. In 1979, Willis recorded a solo album, which remained unreleased for over 35 years. The album, Solo Man, was finally released in August 2015.

=== Copyright terminations ===
In 2012, the United States District Court for the Southern District of California ruled that under the provisions of the Copyright Act of 1976, Willis could terminate his copyright transfers to Scorpio Music and Can't Stop Productions, because "a joint author who separately transfers his copyright interest may unilaterally terminate the grant". Willis subsequently held a 33 percent share of "Go West", "Y.M.C.A.", "In the Navy", and other songs written for Village People and other acts.

In 2015, a jury determined that the sole writers of 13 songs were Morali and Willis, and Henri Belolo's name was removed, giving Willis a 50% ownership of those songs.

=== Return to Village People ===
In 2017, Willis and Belolo, Morali's business partner and co-owner of the group, reached an out-of-court settlement whereby Willis resumed his role as lead singer of Village People, and they resumed recording and touring internationally. In 2018, Willis announced via social media plans for upcoming Village People projects, including a new studio album, a Christmas music video, and a re-issue of the group's 1979 concert originally released as the "live" portion of the album Live & Sleazy. In November 2022, a third single, "Magic Christmas", was released from the group's Magical Christmas album and entered the Billboard Adult Contemporary chart at number 23, the highest chart entry for any Village People single.

=== Political use of music ===
On June 9, 2020, Willis demanded that President Donald Trump not use Village People music at his rallies, in particular "Macho Man" and "Y.M.C.A." However, a few months later, on September 11, it was reported that Willis said he was okay with him using "Y.M.C.A" at his campaign rallies. On October 24, Saturday Night Live performed a parody of the group's reaction to Trump's use of their music at his rallies. Six days later, Willis clarified his and the group's position against Trump's use of his music at rallies. On November 7, supporters of President-elect Joe Biden in Philadelphia celebrated his victory in Pennsylvania by dancing in the streets and singing "Y.M.C.A." Later, Willis announced on Facebook, "The financial benefits have been great... YMCA is estimated to gross several million dollars since the President Elect's continued use of the song. Therefore, I'm glad I allowed the President-elect's continued use of YMCA... I thank him for choosing to use my song".

In January 2025, it was announced that Willis and the Village People would be performing at the Turning Point USA inaugural ball in celebration of Trump's second inauguration. On January 19, the Village People performed "Y.M.C.A." at Trump's pre-inauguration rally, titled the "Make America Great Again Victory Rally", at the Capital One Arena in Washington, D.C., the most high-profile of three inauguration week performances.

Willis stated in a lengthy Facebook post that their performance for President Trump's second inauguration was not an endorsement of Mr. Trump's policies, "no matter what you say to the contrary", and stressed that the group's members believed that music should be shared across the political spectrum "and not preserved for one political side".

== Personal life and death ==
Willis was a drug addict for many years after leaving the Village People and had several run-ins with the law. After an arrest in 2006, he received probation and was ordered to undergo treatment at the Betty Ford Clinic. After completing rehabilitation in 2007, he made his first public statement in more than 25 years, saying, "The nightmare of drug abuse is being lifted from my life ... now that the haze of drugs are gone, I'm thinking and seeing clearer now than I have in years ... I'm looking forward to living the second part of my life drug-free."

From 1978 to 1982, Willis was married to Phylicia Ayers-Allen (now Phylicia Rashad), whom he met during the run of The Wiz. Willis wrote the lyrics and arranged the vocals for her disco concept album, Josephine Superstar, which featured the Village People on backing vocals. In 2007, Willis married Karen Willis, a lawyer and entertainment executive.

Willis died from liver cancer on June 30, 2026, at the age of 74, the day before his 75th birthday.
