= Josephine Superstar =

Studio album by Phylicia Allen
- Released: August 5, 1978
- Studios: Can't Stop Productions, Inc., 65 East 55th Street, New York City
- Genre: Disco
- Length: 32:05
- Label: Casablanca
- Producers: Jacques Morali; Henri Belolo

Singles from Josephine Superstar
- 1. "Colors" Released: 1979 (Mexico)

Josephine Superstar is a disco concept album by American actress Phylicia Rashad, released by Casablanca Records in 1978. It is a musical biography, dedicated to Josephine Baker, detailing Baker's life as she runs away from home and finds fame and love in St. Louis, Broadway, and eventually Paris. It was performed by Rashad, and produced by Jacques Morali and Henri Belolo.

It was Rashad's only album, and was created during her brief marriage to Village People lead vocalist Victor Willis.

Village People and The Ritchie Family contributed background vocals.

== Production ==
The album was produced by Morali and Benlolo's Can't Stop Productions, Inc. (then located at 65 East 55th Street, New York City) with Sigma Sound Studios.

External videos
- Phylicia Allen: Josephine Superstar, Full Album and Televised Performances (1978)

Album photography was done by John Galluzzi, who also photographed contemporaneous album covers such as Village People's Macho Man and The Ritchie Family's African Queens.

The prologue states Rashad's intentions for the album:

My name is Phylicia Allen. It gives me great honor to dedicate this album to the first Black female international star, Miss Josephine Baker. May her spirit live forever.

== Track listing ==
No.	Title	Length
1.	"Prologue"	0:29
2.	"St. Louis"	3:48
3.	"Broadway"	2:48
4.	"Star of Paris"	4:12
5.	"Around the World"	4:38
6.	"Two Loves Have I (J'ai deux amours)"	4:15
7.	"Josephine Superstar"	3:20
8.	"Colors"	4:05
9.	"Don't Cry Mommy"	4:26

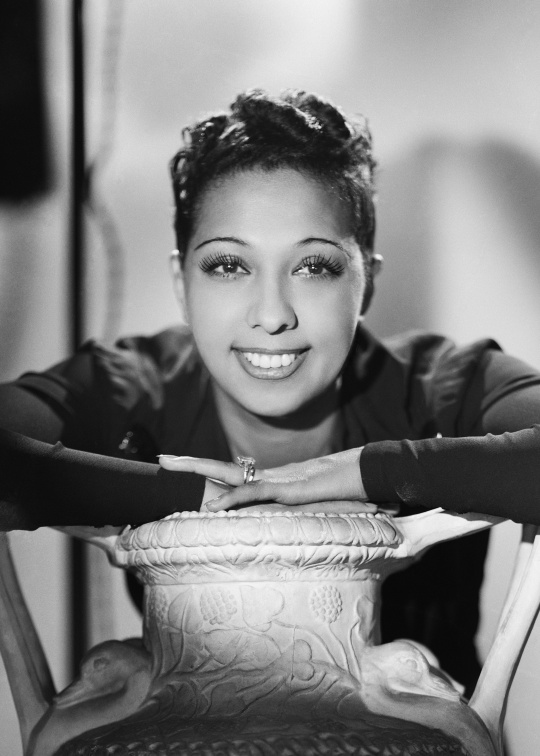
Dancer, singer, and civil rights activist Josephine Baker, the subject of the album.

== Release and reception ==
The album was released on August 5, 1978. It peaked on August 19, 1978 at #28, running for 5 weeks on the Dance Club Songs chart. During its peak day, it was superseded by contemporary chart-toppers such as "Dance (Disco Heat)" by Sylvester (#1), "Boogie Oogie Oogie" by A Taste of Honey (#4), "Last Dance" by Donna Summer (#5), "In The Bush" by Musique (#6), "Miss You" by The Rolling Stones (#8), "American Generation" by The Ritchie Family (#19), and "You Got Me Running" by Lenny Williams (#25).

== Personnel ==
- Phylicia Rashad – lead vocalist
- Jacques Morali – producer; arrangement of rhythm, percussion, and vocals
- Henri Benlolo – executive producer
- Victor Willis – arrangement of vocals
- Alfonso Carey – bass
- Nathaniel "Crocket" Wilke – clavinet
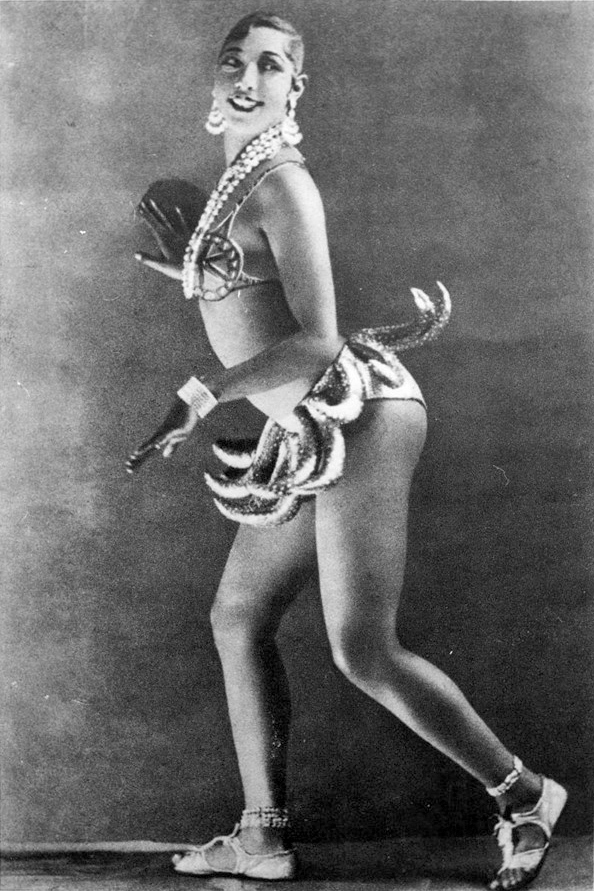
  Baker's banana outfit, on which the album cover is based.
- Errol "Crusher" Bennett – congas
- Russell Dabney – drums
- Jimmy Lee – lead guitar
- Rodger Lee – rhythm guitar
- Peter Whitehead – percussion
- The Ritchie Family – backing vocals
- Village People – backing vocals
- John Galluzzi – photography

== Legacy ==
In 1989, as-yet-unidentified song(s) appeared in the revue Phylicia Rashad & Co. in Las Vegas, Nevada, which featured the actress and her costar Bill Cosby.

== See also ==
- Rasputin, a 1978 Boney M. disco song detailing the life of a historical figure
- Dschinghis Khan, a 1979 disco song also detailing the life of a historical figure
- The Cosby Show, on which Phylicia Rashad later starred as Clair Huxtable
