= The Best Disco in Town =

Single by The Ritchie Family

from the album Arabian Nights
- B-side: "The Best Disco in Town (Pt. 2)"
- Released: 1976
- Genre: Disco
- Length: 2:39 (7" version); 6:39 (Album version)
- Label: Marlin
- Songwriters: Jacques Morali, Richie Rome, Henri Belolo, Phil Hurtt
- Producers: Jacques Morali, Richie Rome

The Ritchie Family singles chronology
"I Want to Dance with You (Dance with Me)" (1975)	"The Best Disco in Town" (1976)	"Life Is Music" (1977)

"The Best Disco in Town" is a 1976 crossover disco single by Philadelphia-based group The Ritchie Family. In the United States, the single was a top 20 hit on both the soul and pop charts. "The Best Disco in Town" went to number one for one week on the disco/dance chart.

== Background ==
The song is a medley of pop and R&B hits, preceding other medleys such as Shalamar's "Uptown Festival" by one year and Stars On 45's "Medley" by five years.

Songs included on the single are "Reach Out I'll Be There", "I Love Music", "Bad Luck", "TSOP", "Fly, Robin, Fly" and the group's own "Brazil". The extended single adds the songs "Love To Love You Baby", "That's the Way (I Like It)", "Lady Bump", "Express", "Lady Marmalade", and the group's own song from the Arabian Nights album, "Romantic Love."

== Chart history ==
=== Weekly charts ===
Chart (1976–77)	Peak position
Australia (Kent Music Report)	3
Belgium (Ultratop 50 Flanders)	5
Belgium (Ultratop 50 Wallonia)	5
Canada RPM	15
Finland (Suomen virallinen lista)	14
France (IFOP)	30
Germany	22
Israel (IBA)	8
Italy (Musica e dischi)	2
Netherlands (Single Top 100)	2
Netherlands (Dutch Top 40)	2
New Zealand	33
Norway	10
Portugal (AFP)	4
Puerto Rico	6
South Africa	18
Spain (AFYVE)	1
Sweden	13
UK Singles Chart	10
U.S. Billboard Hot 100	17
U.S. Billboard Hot Soul Singles	12
U.S. Record World Disco	1
Venezuela	10

=== Year-end charts ===
Chart (1977)	Position
Australia (Kent Music Report)	43
