= Arabian Nights (album) =

Studio album by the Ritchie Family
- Released: 1976
- Recorded: Sigma Sound, Philadelphia, Pennsylvania
- Genre: Disco
- Length: 32:03
- Label: Marlin
- Producer: Jacques Morali, Richie Rome

The Ritchie Family chronology
Brazil (1975)	Arabian Nights (1976)	Life Is Music (1977)

Singles from Arabian Nights
- 1. "The Best Disco in Town" Released: August 1976

Professional ratings
Review scores
Source	Rating
AllMusic	4.5/5 stars

Arabian Nights is the second studio album recorded by American female vocal trio the Ritchie Family, released in 1976 on the Marlin label.

== History ==
The album features the track, "The Best Disco in Town", which peaked at No. 1 on the Hot Dance/Disco chart, No. 17 on the Billboard Hot 100, and No. 12 on the Hot Soul Singles chart.

== Track listing ==
Side one
No.	Title	Writer(s)	Length
1.	"The Best Disco in Town"	Jacques Morali, Richie Rome, Henri Belolo, Phil Hurtt	6:39
2.	"Baby I'm on Fire"	Jacques Morali, Henri Belolo	5:05
3.	"Romantic Love"	Jacques Morali, Richie Rome, Henri Belolo, Peter Whitehead	5:53
Total length:			17:37

Side two
No.	Title	Writer(s)	Length
1.	"Istanbul (Not Constantinople)"	Jimmy Kennedy, Nat Simon	4:22
2.	"Lawrence of Arabia (More Than Yesterday, Less Than Tomorrow)"	Maurice Jarre	3:57
3.	"In a Persian Market (Show Me How You Dance)"	Albert Ketèlbey	6:07
Total length:			14:26

== Personnel ==
- Cheryl Mason Jacks, Cassandra Ann Wooten, Gwendolyn Oliver – vocals
- Don Renaldo – strings, horns
- Richie Rome – electric piano, acoustic piano
- Earl Young, Charles Collins – drums
- Ron Baker, Michael "Sugar Bear" Foreman – bass
- Craig Snyder, Norman Harris, Bobby Eli – guitars
- Nick D'Amico – percussion
- Larry Washington, – congas
- Buddy Turner, Johnny Belmon, Jerry Atkins, James Gitp, Craig Jamerson, William Brown – male vocals

== Production ==
- Jacques Morali, Richie Rome – producers, arrangers
- Henri Belolo – general supervisor
- Joe Tarsia, Jay Mark, Ken Present – engineers
- Michael Hutchinson, Jeff Stewart, Pete Humphreys – assistant engineers
- Vivian Abbott – time coordinator
- John Galluzzi – photographer

== Charts ==
Chart (1976)	Peak
Australia (Kent Music Report)	3
Italian Albums (HitParadeItalia)	1
U.S. Billboard Top LPs	30
U.S. Billboard Top Soul LPs	23

== Certifications and sales ==
Region	Certification	Certified units/sales
Australia (ARIA)	Platinum	50,000^{^}
^{^} Shipments figures based on certification alone.
