= Village People (album) =

Studio album by Village People
- Released: July 18, 1977
- Genre: Disco
- Length: 22:16
- Label: Casablanca
- Producer: Jacques Morali

Village People chronology
| Village People (1977) | Macho Man (1978) |

German cover
- Original German issue, retitled San Francisco (You've Got Me)

Singles from Village People
- 1. "San Francisco (You've Got Me)" Released: 1977; 2. "Village People" Released: 1977

Professional ratings
Review scores
| Source | Rating |
|---|---|
| AllMusic | 3/5 stars |

Village People is the debut studio album by Village People, released on July 18, 1977. Its hit song "San Francisco (You've Got Me)" reached the top 50 in the UK, peaking at #45. In Germany, the album was released as San Francisco (You Got Me).

== History ==
Village People was the creation of Jacques Morali, a French composer. He had written a few dance tunes when he was given a demo tape recorded by singer/actor Victor Willis. Morali approached Willis and told him, "I had a dream that you sang lead on my album and it went very, very big". Willis agreed.

The record was a success, and demand for live appearances soon followed. Morali, his business partner Henri Belolo (under the collaboration Can't Stop Productions) and Willis hastily built a group of dancers to perform with Willis in clubs and on Dick Clark's American Bandstand. As Village People's popularity grew, Morali, Belolo and Willis saw the need for a permanent 'group.' They took out an ad in a music trade magazine which read: "Macho Types Wanted: Must Dance And Have A Moustache."

Although the composers were French, the lyrics were all in English as Morali and Belolo used American lyricists Phil Hurtt and the aforementioned Peter Whitehead.

The band's name references New York City's Greenwich Village neighborhood, at the time known for having a substantial gay population. Morali and Belolo got the inspiration for creating an assembly of American man archetypes based on the gay men of The Village who frequently dressed in various fantasy attire.

== Track listing ==
All tracks written by Jacques Morali, Henri Belolo, Peter Whitehead and Phil Hurtt, except "In Hollywood (Everybody Is a Star)" by Morali, Belolo and Hurtt.

Side one

1. Medley – 10:46
  - "San Francisco (You've Got Me)"
  - "In Hollywood (Everybody Is a Star)"

Side two

1. "Fire Island" – 5:49
2. "Village People" – 5:41

== Production ==
- Executive producer: Henri Belolo
- Produced by Jacques Morali for Can't Stop Production Inc.
- Recorded and mixed by Gerald Block; assistant engineer: J.D. Stewart
- All songs published by Can't Stop Music.

== Charts ==
Chart performance for Village People
| Chart (1977–1978) | Peak position |
|---|---|
| Australian Albums (Kent Music Report) | 21 |
| Canadian Albums (RPM) | 70 |
| Japanese Albums (Oricon) | 88 |
| Swedish Albums (Sverigetopplistan) | 29 |
| US Billboard 200 | 54 |
| US Top R&B/Hip-Hop Albums (Billboard) | 36 |

== Certifications ==
| Region | Certification | Certified units/sales |
|---|---|---|
| Australia (ARIA) | Gold | 35,000^{^} |
| Canada (Music Canada) | Platinum | 100,000^{^} |
| United States (RIAA) | Gold | 500,000^{^} |
^{^} Shipments figures based on certification alone.
