= Life Is Music =

Studio album by the Ritchie Family
- Released: 1977
- Recorded: Sigma Sound, Philadelphia, Pennsylvania
- Genre: Disco
- Length: 34:19
- Label: Marlin
- Producer: Jacques Morali, Richie Rome

The Ritchie Family chronology
Arabian Nights (1976)	Life Is Music (1977)	African Queens (1977)

Professional ratings
Review scores
Source	Rating
AllMusic	3/5 stars

Life Is Music is the third studio album recorded by American female vocal trio the Ritchie Family, released in 1977 on the Marlin label.

== History ==
The album features the title track, which peaked at No. 8 on the Hot Dance/Disco chart along with songs "Lady Luck" and "Disco Blues". "Life Is Music" also peaked at No. 74 on the Hot Soul Singles chart.

== Track listing ==
All tracks are written by Jacques Morali, Richie Rome, Henri Belolo and Phil Hurtt, except where noted.

Side one
No.	Title	Writer(s)	Length
1.	"Life Is Music"	Jacques Morali, Max Gazzola, Richie Rome, Henri Belolo, Phil Hurtt	6:39
2.	"Lady Luck"		3:57
3.	"Long Distance Lover"	Jacques Morali, Richie Rome, Peter Whitehead, Henri Belolo	6:41
Total length:			17:17

Side two
No.	Title	Length
1.	"Liberty"	5:35
2.	"Super Lover"	5:45
3.	"Disco Blues"	5:42
Total length:		17:02

== Personnel ==
- Cheryl Mason Jacks, Cassandra Ann Wooten, Gwendolyn Oliver – vocals
- Richie Rome – electric piano, acoustic piano
- Charles Collins – drums
- Bobby Eli, Craig Snyder, Dennis Harris – guitars
- Larry Washington, – congas
- Don Renaldo – strings, horns
- Jose Hermeto Michelena Do Santos – maracas
- David "Tambourine" Campbell – tambourine
- Michael "Sugar Bear" Foreman – bass
- Buddy Turner, Johnny Belmon, Jerry Atkins, Victor Drayton – male vocals

== Production ==
- Jacques Morali, Richie Rome – producers, arrangers
- Henri Belolo – general supervisor
- Ken Present – engineer
- Darrell Rogers, Jeff Stewart, Dirk Devlin, Carla Bandini – assistant engineers
- Rodolphe Haussaire – photographer

== Charts ==
Chart (1977)	Peak
Australia (Kent Music Report)	23
U.S. Billboard Top LPs	100

Singles

Year	Single	Peak chart positions	
Year	Single	US R&B	US Dan
1977	"Life Is Music"	74	8
1977	"Lady Luck"	—	8
1977	"Disco Blues"	—	8
