= Can't Stop Productions, Inc. =

American record label and production company

Can't Stop Productions, Inc. is a record label and production company founded in 1975 by French producer Henri Belolo and Jacques Morali. In collaboration with various musicians, the two created and represented such acts as Village People, The Ritchie Family, Patrick Juvet, Eartha Kitt, and Break Machine.

Between 1975 and 1978, they had created 18 Gold and 6 Platinum records, sold internationally.

== History ==
The company was founded in 1975 by Henri Belolo and likely Jacques Morali. That year, on August 29, Can't Stop Productions, Inc. filed a U.S. Patent establishing their IP ownership of The Ritchie Family.

Around this time (at least between 1978 and 1982), they were housed in 65 East 55th Street, New York, NY, 10022, at Suite 302.

In 1978, they advertised their successful acts in Billboard magazine, listing the performers and albums beside handwritten text and a stop sign reading, "Can't Stop Sigma Sound from turning out Hits!". Their musicians recorded their albums at Sigma Sound Studios. They had released 18 Gold and 6 Platinum records, available internationally.

In 1986, they moved their office to Suite 428 at the Graybar Building at 420 Lexington Avenue, New York, NY, 10170. The international manager was Henri Belolo and general manager was Max Dahaot-Lavelle.

In 1991, Morali died of AIDS-related causes.

Can't Stop Music is a division of Can't Stop Productions, Inc. According to the WIPO, Can't Stop Music gave lead vocalist Victor Willis a series of grants (titled the "Willis Grants") because, "while Jacques Morali and others composed the music for [several] compositions, Mr. Willis [claimed] to be the sole lyricist".

In 1987, the Village People performers, including original members Alex Briley (the G.I.) and Felipe Rose (the Indian), created Sixuvus "to manage their work" separately from Can't Stop Productions, Inc. Other members of Sixuvus included Eric Anzalone, Jim Newman, Ray Simpson, and Bill Whitfield. Can't Stop allowed Sixuvus to provide live performances as the Village People for several years, asking for 5% of revenue. However, Sixuvus would later face legal action in the 21st century for violating a license that was not renewed.

In a 1997 Billboard magazine, Can't Stop Productions, Inc. advertised Village People's 20th Anniversary Tour, which was dedicated to the late Jacques Morali and thanked Belolo for his continued support. Steve Kopitko was the contact for publishing and licensing in 1997. The record label Scorpio Music in Paris, France - the Village People's global publisher - was also mentioned in the advertisement.

In 2007, they advertised 30 years of the Village People in Billboard with the booking agent Ken DiCamillo of the William Morris Agency (located at 1325 Avenue of the Americas, New York, NY).

On August 25, 2017, Can't Stop Productions sued Sixuvus in White Plains, New York's federal court, to stop the group from performing outside of their license. Sixuvus's license was terminated and Harlem West Entertainment (belonging to original lead singer Victor Willis) now had exclusive use of Village People rights.

As of 2025, Can't Stop Music is headed by Henri Belolo and has stated its intention to "re-establish itself as a strong global presence" in collaboration with Scorpio Label Services.
