= I Am What I Am (Village People song) =

- Cover to German 7" single release

Single by Village People

from the album Macho Man
- B-side: "Key West"
- Released: 1978
- Recorded: 1977
- Studio: Sigma Sound, New York City
- Genre: Disco
- Length: 3:53 (7"); 5:37 (12"/LP)
- Label: Casablanca Records
- Songwriters: Jacques Morali, Henri Belolo, Victor Willis and Peter Whitehead
- Producer: Jacques Morali

Village People singles chronology
"Village People" (1977)	"I Am What I Am" (1978)	"Macho Man" (1978)

"I Am What I Am" is a song written by Victor Willis, Henri Belolo, Peter Whitehead and Jacques Morali that was first released by the Village People on their 1978 album Macho Man. It was also released as a single with "Key West" as the b-side in some countries including Germany and the UK. It did not chart in those countries, but it reached #4 on the Billboard Dance Chart in a medley with "Key West" and "Macho Man". It has since been released on several Village People greatest hits compilation albums. It was also included on the soundtrack for the 1978 film Thank God It's Friday.

Rolling Stone critic Mitchell Schneider described "I Am What I Am" as a "human-rights anthem". Village People singer Randy Jones describes the song as "a gay liberation statement, aimed directly at gays and lesbians who were standing up without apology for their lifestyle" and as the group's "first gay liberation song". He says that the theme of the song is the virtue of being yourself, and not just if you're gay or transgender but even just if you want to dress in an unusual manner, as long as you don't hurt anyone else. Co-writer Willis similar says that the theme is not limited to gays but that "we're saying to everyone – be who you are. We're for people liberation." Michael DeAngelis describes the theme as being "pride and faithfulness to the individual and authentic self." DeAngelis notes that this theme had particular resonance at the time, when the gay community was in the process of "coming out" and a general cultural obsession was finding healthy ways to feel good about oneself. Frédéric Martel identifies "I Am What I Am" as one of five Village People songs that were touchstones to the gay movement in France when they came out ("San Francisco (You've Got Me)", "Macho Man", "Y.M.C.A." and "In the Navy" being the others).

Judith A. Peraino described "I Am What I Am" as a "hit single" while Boze Hadleigh described it as a "pre-hit". Sharon Davis claimed that lyrics are "so camp they have to held down with tent pegs." But Billboard described it as "provocative", describing it as a "gay pride anthem with its activist lyrics and basic theme." Billboard also praised the rhythm and percussion and horn arrangements. AllMusic critic Amy Hanson described it as "a well-constructed slab of groove", despite lacking subtlety. Rolling Stone critic Mitchell Schneider regarded "I Am What I Am" as the best song on Macho Man stating that Willis' voice is "full of anger and delight" on the song and concluding that "because the song seems so committed, it makes the rest of the material sound downright pointless."

Classic Rock History critic Brian Kachejian rated it the Village People's 5th greatest song, calling it "a song of tremendous empowerment in standing up for the rights of gays and lesbians at the time."

Reebok later used the title phrase for a successful trainers advertising campaign.

== "Key West" ==
The b-side of the "I Am What I Am" single was "Key West". Like "I Am What I Am", "Key West" was part of the medley that reached #4 on the Billboard Dance Chart and Peraino also described "Key West" as a "hit single". Jones described "Key West" as "a salute to the Florida town that Ernest Hemingway and Tennessee Williams, along with gay men and women, had made a vacation destination." He noted that it is a "gay friendly resort" that is so "different-thinking" that it remained in the Union despite Florida seceding in the Civil War. Author Chuck Eddy describes "Key West" as one of the Village People's "small hits" and one of several of their songs to "stump for substitute utopias...where there's plenty of 'unity,' 'happiness,' 'liberation' and 'togetherness.' "Key West" has been included on several Village People greatest hits compilation albums.

=== Charts ===
Chart (1979)	Peak position
US Dance Club Songs (Billboard) As a part of the album Macho Man	4
