= I Love Men =

Studio album by Eartha Kitt
- Released: 1984
- Recorded: Power Station, New York, 1981 – 1982
- Genres: Dance; disco
- Label: Can't Stop Productions
- Producer: Jacques Morali

Eartha Kitt chronology
Sentimental Eartha (1970)	I Love Men (1984)	I'm Still Here (1989)

I Love Men is a 1984 studio album by American singer Eartha Kitt, her first album recorded for 14 years. The album was recorded in New York at the Power Station. Produced by French record producer Jacques Morali, who had previously produced recordings by the Village People and The Ritchie Family. This album features Kitt performing Euro disco, dance tracks. The first single released from the album "Where Is My Man" had been previously released in 1983 and had returned Kitt to the UK charts after an absence of 28 years. The single reached #36 after entering the chart in November 1983 and charted in several European countries. and also made the Top 10 of the US Billboard dance chart, where it reached #7. The title track "I Love Men" was issued as the second single and this charted in the UK at #50 in the summer of 1984. The success of this album led to a new collaboration between Kitt and Jacques Morali in 1985 when they recorded two more tracks, "I Don't Care" and "This Is My Life"; the latter also went on to chart in the UK in 1986 at #73. These tracks were also added to later re-issues of the original album.

== Track listing ==
All tracks credited to: Jacques Morali, Fred Zarr and Bruce Vilanch

Side One:

1. "I Love Men" – 7:03
2. "Arabian Song" – 5:48
3. "Sugar Daddy" – 6:37

Side Two:

1. "La Grande Vie" – 5:41
2. "Tonite" – 5:04
3. "Where Is My Man" (Euromix) – 10:08

CD bonus tracks

1. "I Don't Care" – 6:05
2. "This Is My Life" – 5:34

== Personnel ==
- Jacques Morali – Producer
- Henri Belolo – Executive producer
- Fred Zarr – Arranger
- Kenn Duncan – Photography
- Engineered and Mixed by B. Scheniman and D. Greenberg

=== Performance ===
- Eartha Kitt – vocals
- Fred Zarr – Synthesizers and Keyboards
- Ira Siegel – Guitar
- Bill Scheniman – Acoustic guitar
- Bashiri Johnson – Percussion
- Neil Jason – Bass guitar
- Maeretha Stewart, Ullanda McCullough, Diane Wilson, Yvonne Lewis – Backing vocals

== Charts ==
Weekly chart performance for I Love Man
Chart (1984)	Peak position
German Albums (Offizielle Top 100)	34
Swedish Albums (Sverigetopplistan)	42
