= Brazil (The Ritchie Family album) =

Studio album by the Ritchie Family
- Released: 1975
- Recorded: Sigma Sound, Philadelphia, Pennsylvania
- Genre: Disco
- Length: 35:33
- Label: 20th Century
- Producer: Jacques Morali

The Ritchie Family chronology
Brazil (1975)	Arabian Nights (1976)

Singles from Brazil
- 1. "Brazil" Released: July 1975; 2. "I Want to Dance with You (Dance with Me)" Released: November 1975

Professional ratings
Review scores
Source	Rating
AllMusic	2.5/5 stars

Brazil is the debut studio album recorded by American female vocal trio the Ritchie Family, released in 1975 on the 20th Century label.

== History ==
The album features the title track, which peaked at No. 1 on the Hot Dance/Disco chart, No. 11 on the Billboard Hot 100, and No. 13 on the Hot Soul Singles chart. Another single, "Dance with Me", had moderate success on the charts.

== Track listing ==
All tracks are written by Jacques Morali, Henri Belolo and Beauris Whitehead, except where noted.

Side one
No.	Title	Writer(s)	Length
1.	"Peanut Vendor"	Marion Sunshine, L. Wolfe Gilbert, Moisés Simons	6:40
2.	"Frenesi"	Alberto Domínguez	8:00
3.	"Brazil"	Ary Barroso, Bob Russell	4:58
Total length:			19:38

Side two
No.	Title	Length
1.	"Dance with Me"	3:35
2.	"Life Is Fascination"	3:05
3.	"Lady Champagne"	2:25
4.	"Let's Pool"	3:50
5.	"Pinball"	3:00
Total length:		15:55

== Production ==
- Jacques Morali – producer
- Henri Belolo – general supervision
- Joe Tarsia, Jay Mark – engineers
- Michael Hutchinson, Dirk Devlin, J.D. Stewart – assistant engineers
- Grand Illusion – album cover design
- Richie Rome – arranger, assistant producer

== Charts ==
Chart (1975)	Peak
U.S. Billboard Top LPs	53
U.S. Billboard Top Soul LPs	26

Singles

Year	Single	Peak chart positions		
Year	Single	US	US R&B	US Dan
1975	"Brazil"	11	13	1
1975	"Peanut Vendor" / "Frenesi"	—	—	4
1975	"I Want to Dance with You (Dance with Me)"	84	74	18
