= African Queens (album) =

Studio album by the Ritchie Family
- Released: 1977
- Recorded: Sigma Sound, Philadelphia, Pennsylvania
- Genre: Disco
- Label: Marlin
- Producer: Jacques Morali

The Ritchie Family chronology
Life Is Music (1977)	African Queens (1977)	American Generation (1978)

African Queens is the fourth studio album recorded by American female vocal trio the Ritchie Family, released in 1977 on the Marlin label.

== History ==
The album features the track, "Quiet Village", which peaked at No. 1 on the Hot Dance/Disco chart along with songs "African Queens" and "Summer Dance". "Quiet Village" also peaked at No. 68 on the Hot Soul Singles chart.

== Critical reception ==
Professional ratings
Review scores
Source	Rating
AllMusic	2/5 stars

The Bay State Banner wrote that "the music moves swiftly via massive string swoops and spurts of high hat drumming, jetting far away from present reality towards exotic distances only the world of fantasy can reckon."

== Track listing ==
All tracks are written by Jacques Morali, Henri Belolo and Phil Hurtt, except where noted.

Side one
No.	Title	Length
1.	"African Queens (Nefertiti, Cleopatra and the Queen of Sheba)"	4:35
2.	"Theme of Nefertiti"	1:30
3.	"Theme of Cleopatra"	1:30
4.	"Theme of the Queen of Sheba"	1:30
5.	"African Queens (reprise) (Nefertiti, Cleopatra and the Queen of Sheba)"	3:40

Side two
No.	Title	Writer(s)	Length
1.	"Summer Dance"		5:28
2.	"Quiet Village"	Les Baxter	5:45
3.	"Voodoo"		5:35

== Personnel ==
- Gwendolyn Oliver, Cassandra Ann Wooten and Cheryl Mason Jacks - Vocalists
- Russell Dabney – drums
- Alfonso Carey – Fender bass
- Jimmy Lee – lead guitar
- Rodger Lee – rhythm guitar
- Nathaniel "Crocket" Wilke – Fender Rhodes electric piano, clavinet
- Babatunde Olatunji – Ngoma drums, Shekere, bongos
- Ralph MacDonald – tambourines, triangle, bell tree, cowbell
- Mario Grillo – timbales
- Anthony Robinson – congas
- J.M. Diatta – ngoma drums
- Charles Payne – Djembe

Production

- Jacques Morali – producer, rhythm, percussion and vocal arrangements
- Henri Belolo – executive producer
- Phil Hurtt – vocal arrangements
- Horace Ott – strings and horns arrangements
- Gerald Block – engineer
- Carla Bandini, Jeff Stewart – assistant engineers
- John Galluzzi – photographer

== Charts ==
Chart (1977)	Peak
Australia (Kent Music Report)	66
U.S. Billboard Top LPs	164
U.S. Billboard Top Soul LPs	57

Singles

Year	Single	Peak chart positions	
Year	Single	US R&B	US Dan
1977	"Quiet Village"	68	1
1977	"African Queens"	—	1
1977	"Summer Dance"	—	1
