= Honey & the Bees =

American musical group

- Origin: Philadelphia, United States
- Genres: soul
- Years active: 1965 to 1972
- Labels: Academy, ABC, Arctic, Chess, Josie, Bell
- Past members: Jean Davis; Nadine Felder; Gwendolyn Oliver; Cassandra Ann Wooten

Honey & the Bees were a girl group from Philadelphia who had a hit in 1971 with "It's Gonna Take A Miracle". Two of the members of the group would later become part of The Ritchie Family.

== Background ==
According to one source, the group began as The Yum Yums. They began in 1965 and recorded a single "Two Can Play the Same Game" bw "Inside O' Me" which was released on the Academy label. The A side was written by Phil Hurtt. Not long after the single was released, the singers on the record had disappeared. With Hurtt keeping that sound in mind, he revived the name a year later with a different line up. This new line up consisted of Jean Davis, Nadine Felder, Gwendolyn Oliver and Cassandra Ann Wooten.

The group is remembered for their revival of The Royalettes hit, "It's Gonna Take a Miracle". Produced for them by Jimmy Bishop, it became a hit for them in 1971.

A couple of sources point to Fannie Lee Cobb of Fannie & the Varcels having a connection to the original line up. Other members of the first line up were allegedly Rita Graves and Lulu Martin.

== Career ==
By May 1, 1965, a single "Two Can Play the Same Game" bw "Inside O' Me" was released on Academy 114. Credited to Honey & the Bees, it was given a four star rating in Billboard's May 1 issue, Spotlight Winners of the Week Pop section. The singers on the record were not Jean Davis, Nadine Felder, Gwendolyn Oliver or Cassandra Ann Wooten. They were Fannie Lee Cobb, Rita Graves and Lulu Martin.

=== New line up ===
With the new line up of Davis, Felder, Oliver and Wooten, they began their association with Arctic Records in 1966 and recorded a Kenny Gamble song, "One Time is Forever".

In 1970, their manager Jimmy Bishop moved them over to the Josie label.

In 1971, their single "We Got to Stay Together" was released on Josie 1028. Listed in the April 17 issue of Cashbox in their single reviews Picks of the Week section, it was said that it was certain to gain R&B action and pick up Top 40 momentum. The same year they had a hit with "It's Gonna Take a Miracle". After that they recorded two more singles which were released on the Bell label. The singles failed to make an impression and the group disbanded.

== Later years ==
At some stage Cassandra Ann Wooten and Nadine Felder were asked to come to New York to do some background vocals on a song. Jacques Morali and Patrick Adams were co-producing the song. Morali said to them that if he ever were to put a girl group together then they would be called. And two years later he did call but by that time Felder had lost interest in doing secular music. Later Gwendolyn Oliver and Cassandra Ann Wooten joined with Cheryl Mason-Jacks to become The Ritchie Family. Wooten would also be part of Cas Mijac.

Gwen Oliver died on November 27, 2020, at age 71.

== Discography ==
Singles
Act	Release	Catalogue	Year	Notes #
Honey & the Bees	"Inside O' Me" / "Two Can Play the Same Game"	Academy 114	1965	Different line up consisting of Fannie Lee Cobb, Rita Graves, Lulu Martin.
The Yum Yums	"Looky, Looky" / "Gonna Be A Big Thing"	ABC Records 45-10697	1965	
Honey & the Bees	"I'm Confessin'" / "One Time Is Forever"	Arctic 118	1966	
Honey & the Bees	"Love Addict" / "I'll Be There"	Arctic 149	1969	
Honey & the Bees	"Together Forever" / "Dynamite Exploded"	Arctic 152	1969	
Honey & the Bees	"Sunday Kind of Love / "Do That Thing"	Artic 158	1969	
Honey & the Bees	"Jing Jing A Ling" / "Auld Lang Syne"	North bay 303	1969	
Honey & the Bees	"Jing Jing A Ling" / "Auld Lang Syne"	Chess 2088	1969	
Honey & the Bees	"Make Love to Me" / "Please Have Mercy baby"	Josie 1017	1970	
Honey & the Bees	"Help Me (Get Over My Used to Be Lover)" / "Please Have Mercy Baby"	Josie 1020	1970	
Honey & the Bees	"Make Love to Me baby" / "People Need Each Other"	Josie 1023	1970	
Honey & the Bees	"Come Get It" / "Love Can Turn to Hate"	Josie 1025	1970	
Honey & the Bees	"We Got to Stay Together" / "Help Me (Get Over My Used to Be Lover)"	Josie 1028	1971	
Honey & the Bees	"It's Gonna Take a Miracle" / "What About Me"	Josie 1030	1971	
Honey & the Bees	"That's What Boys Are Made For" / "Has Somebody Taken My Place"	Bell 217	1972	
Honey & the Bees	"Leave Me Alone" / "Song for Jim"	Bell 299	1972	

Albums
Act	Release	Catalogue	Year	Notes #
Honey & the Bees	Love	Josie JOS 4013	1970	LP
Honey & the Bees	Dynamite!	Jamie 4009; Philly Original Soul Classics – Volume 2	1999	CD Compilation
Honey & the Bees	Come Get It - The Complete Josie Recordings 1970-1971	Westside WESM 614	2000	CD Compilation UK
Honey & the Bees	Love	Parlophone WPCR 27708	2014	CD (Japan); CD release of 1970 album
