= Go West (Village People album) =

Studio album by Village People
- Released: March 26, 1979
- Recorded: 1978
- Genre: Disco
- Length: 30:33
- Label: Casablanca
- Producer: Jacques Morali

Village People chronology
Cruisin' (1978)	Go West (1979)	Live and Sleazy (1979)

Singles from Go West
- 1. "In the Navy" Released: March 17, 1979; 2. "Go West" Released: June 1979

Go West is the fourth studio album by the Village People, released on March 26, 1979. It features their hit singles "In the Navy" (No. 3 on the US Billboard Hot 100, No. 2 in the UK Top 40) and "Go West", which the Pet Shop Boys did a successful cover of in 1993.

The album was reissued on CD in 1996.

Go West would be the band's last complete album of all-new material for Casablanca, as well as the last album to feature Victor Willis.

== Critical reception ==
Professional ratings
Review scores
Source	Rating
AllMusic	2/5 stars
Christgau's Record Guide	B−
Smash Hits	5/10

Billboard stated that the album contains "some of the most irresistible rhythm in today's pop /disco genre." Billboard described the song "I Wanna Shake Your Hand" as "an appropriately non romantic twist on the Beatles", with its mock exhortation to "Don't be shy/ go up and say hello." The New York Times wrote that the album is "set to a pounding disco beat, overlaid with glutinously symphonic arrangements and Victor Willis's hoarse, sweaty vocals." AllMusic critic Amy Hanson felt that aside from the two singles and "Manhattan Woman," which she felt "contained some interesting, James Brown-inflected vocalizations," the remaining songs "sound like a rehash of the band's already released finest."

== Track listing ==
All tracks are written by Henri Belolo, Jacques Morali and Victor Willis.

No.	Title	Length
1.	"In the Navy"	5:39
2.	"Go West"	4:10
3.	"Citizens of the World"	5:32
4.	"I Wanna Shake Your Hand"	4:40
5.	"Get Away Holiday"	5:22
6.	"Manhattan Woman"	5:10

== Charts ==
=== Weekly charts ===
Weekly chart performance for Go West
Chart (1979)	Peak position
Australian Albums (Kent Music Report)	8
Austrian Albums (Ö3 Austria)	22
Belgian Albums (BEA)	6
Canadian Albums (RPM)	2
Dutch Albums (Album Top 100)	8
Finnish Albums (Suomen virallinen lista)	2
French Albums (SNEP)	9
German Albums (Offizielle Top 100)	14
Icelandic Albums (Tónlist)	6
Italian Albums (AFI)	15
Japanese Albums (Oricon)	18
New Zealand Albums (RMNZ)	28
Norwegian Albums (VG-lista)	4
Spanish Albums (AFE)	14
Swedish Albums (Sverigetopplistan)	7
Swiss Albums (Schweizer Hitparade)	11
UK Albums (Official Charts)	14
US Billboard 200	8
Zimbabwean Albums (ZIMA)	2

=== Year-end charts ===
Year-end chart performance for Go West
Chart (1979)	Position
Canada Top Albums/CDs (RPM)	24
US Billboard 200	89

== Certifications and sales ==
Region	Certification	Certified units/sales
Australia (ARIA)	Gold	20,000^{^}
Canada (Music Canada)	3× Platinum	300,000^{^}
France (SNEP)	Gold	100,000^{*}
Germany	—	500,000
United Kingdom (BPI)	Gold	100,000^{^}
United States (RIAA)	Platinum	1,000,000^{^}
^{*} Sales figures based on certification alone.^{^} Shipments figures based on certification alone.
