= Macho Man (song) =

Single by Village People

from the album Macho Man
- B-side: "Key West"
- Released: June 24, 1978
- Recorded: November 29, 1977
- Studio: Sigma Sound, New York City
- Genre: Disco
- Length: 3:30 (7"); 5:21 (12")
- Label: Casablanca
- Songwriters: Jacques Morali; Henri Belolo; Victor Willis; Peter Whitehead
- Producer: Jacques Morali

Village People singles chronology
"I Am What I Am" (1978)	"Macho Man" (1978)	"Y.M.C.A." (1978)

Alternative release(s)
- One of side-A labels of the US single

Audio
- "Macho Man" on YouTube

"Macho Man" is a song by American disco group Village People, released as the second single and title song of their album Macho Man (1978). The song entered the Billboard Hot 100 on June 24, 1978 (when the album had already been charting since March) before picking up more airplay that August. It became the Village People's first charting hit in the United States, peaking on the Hot 100 at number 25 on the week of September 2.

A medley with "I Am What I Am" and "Key West" reached number four on the Billboard Dance Music/Club Play Singles chart. On the survey of Chicago radio superstation WLS-AM, "Macho Man" spent two weeks at number three.

== Background ==
Martin Aston writes, in his book Breaking Down the Walls of Heartache: A History of How Music Came Out, that Jacques Morali, already having a lead singer with Victor Willis, and after what he calls the "more comical than sexy: unrehearsed" promo video for the song "San Francisco (You've Got Me)", placed the advert "Macho types wanted: must dance and have a moustache" in the trade press. Village People cowboy Randy Jones recalled, "The Monday after Thanksgiving (1977), we signed contracts and the Tuesday after, we were in studio recording "Macho Man", with Victor Willis' handwritten lyrics that were written in the morning with egg stains and coffee rings on it. Everything was happening that quickly."

== Reception ==
Billboard described the song as a "spirited fast paced percussive track highlighted by multi -part harmonies and a rugged lead vocal." Cash Box said that "this funky number should be a dance floor hit" and praised the hook. Record World called it an "energetic dance-r&b tune" whose "vocal is good...with a touch of humor."

== Music video ==
Aston writes that it was "back to the gym for 'Macho Man'" and that "[t]he aesthetic of Bob Mizer's Physique Pictorial was now all over national TV in a Village People music video." The band members are seen working out and dancing in a gym while performing the song. At the beginning, David Hodo is seen picking up his hard hat, but the others go on performing as if nothing happened.

== Charts ==
=== Weekly charts ===
Chart (1978)	Peak position
Australia (Kent Music Report)	3
Canada Top Singles (RPM)	16
Finland (Suomen virallinen lista)	26
New Zealand (Recorded Music NZ)	7
US Billboard Hot 100	25
US Disco Singles (Billboard)	14

=== Year-end charts ===
Chart (1978)	Rank
Australia (Kent Music Report)	6
Canada	153
New Zealand	40
US (Joel Whitburn's Pop Annual)	166

== Certifications and sales ==
Region	Certification	Certified units/sales
Australia (ARIA)	Gold	50,000^{^}
Canada (Music Canada)	Platinum	150,000^{^}
United States (RIAA)	Gold	1,000,000^{^}
Summaries
Latin America	—	2,000,000
^{^} Shipments figures based on certification alone.

== Censorship ==
The song was banned in Saudi Arabia when it was part of a larger restriction on Western music and cultural influences during that time.

== In popular culture ==
A version of the song appeared in The Muppet Show episode with guest star Victor Borge, sung by Gonzo and Link Hogthrob.

In 1995, the song was featured in an Old El Paso commercial, with lyrics changed to "Nacho, nacho, man".

The race horse, Mucho Macho Man, who won the 2013 Breeders' Cup Classic and was third in the 2011 Kentucky Derby, was named after the song.

In 2020, the song was frequently used at rallies for US President Donald Trump. Originally, the band stated that Trump was entitled to use the song, provided it was not used in a way that suggested endorsement. However, Victor Willis said that Trump would no longer be welcome to use the song if Trump followed through on his threat to set the military on Black Lives Matter protestors in June of 2020. The song was used at the Trump rally in Warren, Michigan in September 2020. In the week after the 2020 election, Alec Baldwin, in character on Saturday Night Live as Trump delivering a concession speech, performed a ballad version of "Macho Man", echoing Kate McKinnon's parody of Hillary Clinton on the same program in 2016. Trump resumed the use of the song at his 2024 campaign rallies; in response, the Village People's manager wrote a cease and desist letter to the Trump campaign.
