= Where Is My Man =

Single by Eartha Kitt

from the album I Love Men
- Released: 1983
- Studio: Power Station (New York City)
- Length: 6:08
- Label: StreetWise
- Songwriter(s): Bruce Vilanch, Fred Zarr, Jacques Morali
- Producer(s): Jacques Morali

Eartha Kitt singles chronology
"Che Vale Per Me" (1968)	"Where Is My Man" (1983)	"I Love Men" (1984)

"Where Is My Man" is a song from 1983 by the American singer and actress Eartha Kitt, which appeared on her 1984 album I Love Men. The song was co-written by comedy writer Bruce Vilanch along with musicians and producers Fred Zarr and Jacques Morali.

== Composition ==
The song features Kitt singing in a low, seductive-sounding voice. Included in the song are some sounds that have come to be associated with Kitt, including a purring sound similar to one she made while portraying Catwoman on the 1960s TV series Batman. The lyrics to the song detail specific things the singer expects to receive from her future lover, such as a trip to Saint-Tropez and shopping at Tiffany & Co.

== Failures ==
The title failed to find release in the United States until the producers' attorneys (the firm of Grubman, Indursky, Shindler) introduced the title to their client, New York based Streetwise Records. Streetwise Records released the title in late 1983 in the United States to the dance and club markets. It was Kitt's first recording released in the United States after she was ostracized and fled into self-imposed exile in Paris following her outspoken objection to the Vietnam War at a White House function in 1968. The song became her biggest-selling single in 30 years.

== Charts ==
In the United Kingdom, "Where Is My Man" reached the top 40 on the UK Singles Chart, where it peaked at number 36 to give Kitt her first UK hit since "Under the Bridges of Paris" in 1955. The single was also a hit around the world, peaking at number one in Greece, number five in Sweden, number six in Belgium, and number 12 in Netherlands. In the United States, the song reached the top 10 on the Billboard Dance/Disco Top 80 chart, peaking at number seven and remaining on the survey for 14 weeks.

Chart (1983)	Peak position
Australia (Kent Music Report)	70
Belgium (Ultratop 50 Flanders)	6
Greece (IFPI)	1
Netherlands (Dutch Top 40)	12
Netherlands (Single Top 100)	22
New Zealand (Recorded Music NZ)	28
South Africa (Springbok Radio)	6
Sweden (Sverigetopplistan)	5
UK Singles (OCC)	36
US Dance/Disco Top 80 (Billboard)	7
West Germany (GfK)	31
