= Macho Man (album) =

Studio album by Village People
- Released: February 27, 1978
- Recorded: 1977
- Studios: Sigma Sound, New York City
- Genre: Disco
- Length: 27:23
- Label: Casablanca
- Producer: Jacques Morali

Village People chronology
| Village People (1977) | Macho Man (1978) | Cruisin' (1978) |

Singles from Macho Man
- 1. "Macho Man" Released: June 1978; 2. "I Am What I Am" Released: 1978

Professional ratings
Review scores
| Source | Rating |
|---|---|
| AllMusic | 2.5/5 stars |
| Christgau's Record Guide | C |
| Rolling Stone | Favorable |

Macho Man is the second studio album by Village People, released on February 27, 1978. The album gained success due to its hit singles, "Macho Man" (US Billboard pop chart No. 25) and "Key West". Rolling Stone said of the album, "It seems certain to become the first out-and-out disco album without John Travolta on its cover ever to be certified platinum".

The album was reissued on CD in 1999.

== Background ==
Village People began in 1977 as a studio project of French producers Jacques Morali, Henri Belolo and lead singer Victor Willis. Village People’s first album, Village People, was recorded by Willis with the help of studio musicians. After the success of that album, Morali and Belolo received numerous requests for live performances. In response, Morali, Belolo and Willis began to work on the formation of a full group of singers and dancers. They placed an ad in New York theatre trade magazines that read: "Macho Types Wanted: Must Dance and Have a Moustache".

Randy Jones, known as the cowboy member of Village People, explains that "there was a dire need to have six capable performers to breathe life into the fantasies of the music and to sing, promote, and bring the concept of Village People to television and to the live performance onstage." The new line-up of Willis, Jones, Glenn Hughes, Felipe Rose, David Hodo and Alex Briley made its debut on the cover of the already-recorded album Macho Man. Willis and Rose were the only ones who had performed on the recording of the album.

== Track listing ==
All tracks are written by Jacques Morali, Victor Willis, Henri Belolo and Peter Whitehead, except where noted.

Macho Man track listing
| No. | Title | Length |
|---|---|---|
| 1. | "Macho Man" | 5:14 |
| 2. | "I Am What I Am" | 5:38 |
| 3. | "Key West" | 5:46 |
| 4. | "Just a Gigolo" (Leonello Casucci, Irving Caesar) | 1:15 |
| 5. | "I Ain't Got Nobody" (Spencer Williams, Roger A. Graham) | 3:22 |
| 6. | "Sodom and Gomorrah" | 6:15 |

== Personnel ==
According to Allmusic, the personal on the album included:

- Alfonso Carey - Bass
- Errol Crusher Bennett - Congas
- Phil Kraus, Felipe Rose, Peter Whitehead - Percussion
- Jimmy Lee, Rodger Lee, Nathanial Wilkie - Guitar
- Nathanial Wilkie - Clavinet
- Russell Dabney - Drums
- Victor Willis - Vocals

== Charts ==
=== Weekly charts ===
Weekly chart performance for Macho Man
| Chart (1978) | Peak position |
|---|---|
| Australian Albums (Kent Music Report) | 5 |
| Canadian Albums (RPM) | 21 |
| French Albums (SNEP) | 6 |
| Swedish Albums (Sverigetopplistan) | 37 |
| US Billboard 200 | 24 |
| US Top R&B/Hip-Hop Albums (Billboard) | 31 |
| Zimbabwean Albums (ZIMA) | 11 |

=== Year-end charts ===
Year-end chart performance for Macho Man
| Chart (1978) | Position |
|---|---|
| Australian Albums (Kent Music Report) | 14 |

== Certifications and sales ==
Certifications and sales for Macho Man
| Region | Certification | Certified units/sales |
|---|---|---|
| Australia (ARIA) | Gold | 35,000^{^} |
| Canada (Music Canada) | 3× Platinum | 300,000^{^} |
| United States (RIAA) | Platinum | 1,000,000^{^} |
Summaries
| Worldwide | — | 2,000,000 |
^{^} Shipments figures based on certification alone.
