= Maraschino Cherry =

Maraschino Cherry may refer to:

- Maraschino cherry, a preserved, sweetened cherry
- Maraschino Cherry (film), a 1978 American adult erotic film
