= Wade Nichols =

American actor (1946–1985)

- Nichols on The Edge of Night, January 1980
- Born: Dennis Posa; October 28, 1946; Freeport, New York, U.S.
- Died: January 28, 1985 (aged 38); New York City, U.S.
- Other name: Dennis Parker
- Occupations: Actor; singer
- Years active: 1972–1984
- Notable work: The Edge of Night

Dennis Posa (October 28, 1946 – January 28, 1985), also known by the performing names of Wade Nichols and Dennis Parker, was an American actor and singer, who started his career in adult films.

== Early life ==
Posa was born in 1946 in Manhattan, New York, and raised in Freeport, New York. He attended the Philadelphia Museum College of Art, studying furniture design. During his stint at PMCA, he won a role in a touring company production of The Trojan Women. He later attended New York University and the Herbert Berghof Studio, where he studied acting. He supported himself by working as a carpenter for several years.

== Career ==
Posa's first feature film role was in the gay adult film Boy 'Napped (1975). He subsequently appeared mostly in straight porn films shot in New York, such as Summer of Laura (1975), Jail Bait (1976), Barbara Broadcast (1977), Teenage Pajama Party (1977), Maraschino Cherry (1977), Punk Rock (1977), Take Off (1978) and Blonde Ambition (1981). He was credited as "Wade Nichols" in most of the adult films in which he appeared.

In 1979, using the name "Dennis Parker", he recorded a disco album on Casablanca Records, titled Like an Eagle. The album was produced by Village People creator and record producer, Jacques Morali, of whom he was boyfriend at the time. He also toured Europe to promote the album. That same year, Parker appeared as a singer in a disco club in the French film Monique, with "Like an Eagle" being used as its theme song. The title track was released as a single and appears on the box set The Casablanca Records Story (1994). "New York By Night", another song recorded as Dennis Parker, peaked at No. 11 on the South African music charts in 1980.

Parker joined the cast of the soap opera The Edge of Night in 1979 as Police Chief Derek Mallory. He continued in the role until 1984.

== Death ==
Parker died on January 28, 1985. It was revealed later that he died of an unspecified AIDS-related illness. There was a prevalent rumor that circulated around that Parker had died by suicide after receiving his AIDS diagnosis rather than dying directly of the illness, but his older brother denied this was true in an oral history published on The Rialto Report.

== Partial filmography ==
Movie Title	Distributor	Year
Boy 'Napped	Hand-In-Hand	1975
Summer of Laura	VCA	1975
Bang Bang You Got It!	Video-X-Pix	1976
Call Me Angel, Sir	Video Home Library	1976
Odyssey: The Ultimate Trip	VCX	1977
Captain Lust	International Home Video Corporation	1977
Jail Bait	Command Video	1976
Come to Me	Air Video	1976
Punk Rock	Atom	1977
Teenage Pajama Party	VEP	1977
Barbara Broadcast	VCA	1977
Virgin Dreams	VCX	1977
The Secret Dreams of Mona Q	Arrow Productions	1977
Maraschino Cherry	Video-X-Pix	1977
Honeymoon Haven	Video-X-Pix	1977
Sweetheart	Video-X-Pix	1977
Take Off	Video-X-Pix	1978
Visions	Quality-X-Video	1978
Love You!	Essex Video	1979
Magic Girls	Horizon	1980
Beach House	Caballero Home Video	1980
Blonde Ambition	Video-X-Pix	1981
Hot Pursuit	VCA	1983
Bizarre Thunder	Ribu Video	1984
Jawbreakers	Ventura	1985
