= Michael Gaunt =

American pornographic actor (born 1946)

- Born: May 23, 1946 (age 79); New York City
- Other names: Michael Grant, Michael Dattorre, Michael Dattore, Michael Cattore, Michael Daytore

Michael Gaunt is a former pornographic actor who appeared in many films during the Golden Age of Porn, including Barbara Broadcast in 1977 and Maraschino Cherry in 1978.

== Awards and nominations ==
- 1988 AVN Award – Best Supporting Actor – Firestorm II
- 1988 AVN Award – Best Actor – Cravings (nominated)
