= Ice (The Ritchie Family song) =

2016 song by The Ritchie Family

Single by The Ritchie Family
- Released: 2016
- Genre: Dance
- Length: 4:10
- Label: Purple Rose Records 190394598624
- Songwriter(s): Zach Adam
- Producer(s): Purple Rose Records

"Ice" was a hit for The Ritchie Family on the Billboard dance chart in 2016. It featured two of the original members and a new member.

== Background ==
The single was released in July 2016 on Martha Wash's Purple Rose Records label. It was composed by Zach Adam and produced by Martha Wash's Purple Rose label team. The singers on this recording were Cassandra Wooten, Cheryl Mason-Dorman and Renée Guillory-Wearing. This was their first hit in nearly 40 years and it reached No. 40 on the Billboard dance chart in November 2016.

== Versions ==
The song was later remixed and released as a maxi-single of six tracks. Remixes were done by Chris Cox and Moto Blanco.
