= Phil Hurtt =

American singer-songwriter

- Born: Phillip Levi Hurtt; April 12, 1942 (age 84); Wilmington, DE, United States
- Genres: Pop; R&B; Disco
- Occupations: Record producer; songwriter

Phil Hurtt (born April 12, 1942) is a musician, singer, songwriter and arranger who has written hits for The Detroit Spinners, The Ritchie Family and many others. His compositions have been recorded by many artists and he has worked as an arranger on recordings by well-known artists in the Soul genre.

== Background ==
Phil Hurtt started out singing in church. At the age of 10, he and his oldest brother Al were singing on street corners. By the age of 12, he and his brother had formed a group with their cousin Sarah. They were known as Sarah & the Dreams. They got a steady gig performing in Gold Room of the Theresa Hotel in Harlem. After cousin Sarah left the group in 1957, they became The Swinging Phillies. Philadelphia DJ named Jocko Henderson had something to do with the name change. That year, they signed a recording contract with Deluxe Records. By the time Hurtt was 15, they had released a single, "Frankenstein's Party" b/w "L-O-V-E". Both tunes were written by his brother Al with Phil Hurtt writing the lyrics for "L-O-V-E". He continued performing throughout his youth and kept working on his song-writing skills. There was a demand for him to work contributing background vocals in New York and Philadelphia sessions. He knew for him that songwriting was what he wanted to do.

With his former high school mate Thom Bell he wrote "I'll Be Around for The Detroit Spinners which turned out to be their first no 1 hit. He also co-wrote the song, "The Best Disco in Town" with Jacques Morali, Richie Rome and Henri Belolo. This was the second single for The Ritchie Family. The song became a worldwide smash hit. In diversity he also write the music for the Nutricize exercise record which was released in 1982. Other artists he has produced recordings for include Willis Jackson with his 1975 The Way We Were album.

== Career ==
By August 11, 1973, the song he had co-written with Bunny Sigler, "Sweet Charlie Babe" had been in the charts for two weeks and was moving in a positive direction for singer Jackie Moore.

By July 1978, his Giving it Back album was released on Fantasy F9552. The material was co-written with Richie Rome.

By August 1979, his album PH Factor was out on Fantasy F9572. In the Billboard Recommended LPs section, the songs singled out were "I Think It's About Time" and "I'm In Love Again". Also that month, his disco hit, " Boogie City (Rock And Boogie Down)" peaked at No. 61.

Hurtt co-wrote the 1982 hit You'll Never Know for Hi-Gloss.
