= Richie Rome =

- Born: Richard V. Di Cicco; January 16, 1930; Philadelphia, Pennsylvania, U.S.
- Died: December 15, 2020 (aged 90)
- Genres: Disco, rock, soul, soft rock
- Occupations: Arranger, producer, pianist, songwriter, singer
- Instruments: Piano, vocals
- Years active: 1958–2020
- Label: Elektra Records

Richie Rome (born Richard V. Di Cicco; January 16, 1930 – December 15, 2020) was an American record producer, arranger and orchestra conductor, primarily known for work during the 1970s.

== Early life and career ==
Rome was born in Philadelphia, Pennsylvania on January 16, 1930. He began his career composing arrangements in the 1960s, with, as one of his earliest professional works, a medley of "Green Apples" and "Something" by the O'Jays (from their Neptune album The O'Jays in Philadelphia). He was also the arranger for Inez and Charlie Foxx on their hit "Mockingbird", which reached the US Top 10 in 1963.

Rome went on to work with various musical artists in the recording industry, such as The Ritchie Family, Mike Douglas, Vic Damone. Three Degrees, Bobby Scott, Florence Henderson, Leslie Uggams, Jane Olivor, the Tymes. Pixanne, Patti LaBelle, Frankie Avalon, Lovin' Spoonful, Stanley Turrentine, Tony Orlando, Barbara McNair, Richard Hatch and others. He was a musical arranger or conductor for television programs highlighting musical artists and also scored films.

In collaboration with, and as arranger for, producer Jacques Morali, Rome established the disco recording group the Ritchie Family in 1975, whose albums include Brazil (1975), Arabian Nights (1976), and Life Is Music (1977).

Rome's signature style is marked by lush orchestrations, interweaving multidimensional horns and strings to accentuate the sensuality of the compositions. His various other projects include Jimmy Ruffin's "Fallin' in Love with You" (1977), the Sweet Inspirations' "Black Sunday" (1977), the Chi-Lites' "My First Mistake" (1977), Flower's "Midnight Dancing", "How", and "Our Never-Ending Love" (1979), and, in collaboration with Phil Hurtt, Stanley Turrentine's "Disco Dancing" (1978) and Hurtt's "Giving It Back" (1978).

== Death ==
Rome died on December 15, 2020, at the age of 90.

== Literature ==
- Whitburn, Joel: Joel Whitburn's Top Pop Albums 1955-1992, Record Research Inc, 1993, ISBN 978-0-89820-093-5, p. 624
- Shapiro, Peter: Turn the Beat Around: The Secret History of Disco, Faber & Faber, 2003, ISBN 978-0-86547-952-4, p. 223
