= In the Navy =

1979 single by Village People

Single by Village People

from the album Go West
- B-side: "Manhattan Woman"
- Released: March 17, 1979
- Recorded: 1978
- Genre: Disco
- Length: 5:39 (album version); 3:45 (single edit)
- Label: Casablanca
- Songwriters: Jacques Morali; Henri Belolo; Victor Willis
- Producer: Jacques Morali

Village People singles chronology
| "Y.M.C.A." (1978) | "In the Navy" (1979) | "Go West" (1979) |

Music video
- "In the Navy" on YouTube

"In the Navy" is a song by American disco group Village People. It was released as the first single from their fourth studio album, Go West (1979). It was a number one hit in Canada, Flanders, Japan and the Netherlands, while reaching number two in Ireland, Norway and the UK. In 1994, a remix charted at number 36 in the UK. "In the Navy" was the last top 10 hit for the group in the United States, peaking at number three.

== Background, writing and video ==
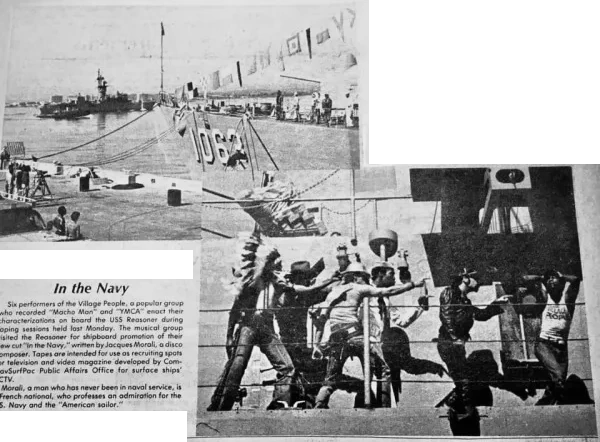
Music video being filmed in mid-1978

After the enormous commercial success of their 1978 hit "Y.M.C.A.", which unexpectedly became the unofficial hymn and powerful advertising tool for the worldwide youth organization YMCA, the group took on another national institution, the United States Navy. The Navy contacted group manager Henri Belolo to use the song in a recruiting advertising campaign for television and radio. Belolo gave the rights free on condition that the Navy help them shoot the music video. Less than a month later in June 1978, the group arrived at Naval Base San Diego where the Navy provided them with access to film on the deck of the berthed frigate USS Reasoner; in the end, the Navy did not use the video, choosing to remain with the traditional "Anchors Aweigh".

In a landmark ruling in 2012, the United States District Court for the Southern District of California ruled that under the Copyright Act of 1976, co-writer Victor Willis (Village People's "Cop"/"Naval officer") could recover his share of the copyrights to songs co-written by him. Willis now owned 33% of his songs.

Another music video for the song was made during production of the 1996 comedy movie Down Periscope, featuring the movie's cast and clips from the movie. The music video is shown during the movie's end credits.

== Critical reception ==
According to Billboard Magazine, "In the Navy" is an "upbeat dance effort [which] showcases the group's familiar theme and sound with this comedic spoof on the Navy." Cash Box said it has "a vibrant beat, powerful horns, sweeping strings and another knock-out campy lyric." Record World called it a "pounding disco number with a chuckle in the lyrics."

== Charts ==
=== Weekly charts ===
| Chart (1979) | Peak position |
|---|---|
| Australia (Kent Music Report) | 7 |
| Austria (Ö3 Austria Top 40) | 5 |
| Belgium (Ultratop 50 Flanders) | 1 |
| Canada Top Singles (RPM) | 1 |
| Ecuador (Radio Vision) | 5 |
| Finland (Suomen virallinen lista) | 3 |
| Ireland (IRMA) | 2 |
| Italy (Musica e dischi) | 12 |
| Netherlands (Dutch Top 40) | 1 |
| Netherlands (Single Top 100) | 1 |
| New Zealand (Recorded Music NZ) | 7 |
| Norway (VG-lista) | 2 |
| Sweden (Sverigetopplistan) | 3 |
| Switzerland (Schweizer Hitparade) | 7 |
| UK Singles (OCC) | 2 |
| US Billboard Hot 100 | 3 |
| West Germany (Official German Charts) | 3 |

| Chart (1994) | Peak position |
|---|---|
| UK Dance (Music Week) | 18 |

=== Year-end charts ===
| Chart (1979) | Rank |
|---|---|
| Australia (Kent Music Report) | 51 |
| Canada Top 200 (RPM) | 27 |
| UK Top 100 (Record Mirror) | 49 |
| US Billboard Hot 100 | 48 |
| US Cash Box Top 100 | 36 |

== Certifications and sales ==
| Region | Certification | Certified units/sales |
|---|---|---|
| Canada (Music Canada) | Platinum | 150,000^{^} |
| France (SNEP) | Gold | 500,000^{*} |
| United Kingdom (BPI) | Silver | 250,000^{^} |
| United States (RIAA) | Gold | 1,000,000^{^} |
Summaries
| Worldwide | — | 2,000,000 |
^{*} Sales figures based on certification alone.^{^} Shipments figures based on certification alone.

== In popular culture ==
In the Black Mirror episode "Loch Henry", characters create a parody of "In the Navy" where they change the song's lyrics as a form of gallows humor while describing a site where murders had taken place. It was also used in The Simpsons episode "Simpson Tide", and in The Muppet Show with guest star Roger Moore.
