= Aquarela do Brasil =

Original samba written and composed by Ary Barroso

Song
- Language: Portuguese
- English title: Brazil
- Composer: Ary Barroso
- Lyricists: Ary Barroso, Bob Russell (English version)

"Aquarela do Brasil" (Portuguese: [akwaˈɾɛlɐ du bɾaˈziw]; 'Watercolor of Brazil'), commonly known in the English-speaking world simply as "Brazil", is a samba song written by Ary Barroso in 1939. The patriotic lyrics and celebration of the country of Brazil in the song helped create the genre of samba-exaltação. Recordings of the song were massively popular abroad and were featured in movies such as Saludos Amigos and the titular Brazil.

== Background and composition ==
Ary Barroso wrote "Aquarela do Brasil" in early 1939, when he was prevented from leaving his home one rainy night due to a heavy storm. Its title, a reference to watercolor painting, is a clear reference to the rain. He also wrote "Três lágrimas" (Three Teardrops) on that same night, before the rain ended.

Describing the song in an interview to Marisa Lira, of the newspaper Diário de Notícias, Barroso said that he wanted to "free the samba away from the tragedies of life, of the sensual scenario already so explored". According to the composer, he "felt all the greatness, the value and the wealth of our land", reliving "the tradition of the national panels".

Initially, he wrote the first chords, which he defined as "vibrant", and a "plangent of emotions". The original beat "sang on [his] imagination, highlighting the sound of the rain, on syncope beats of fantastic tambourins". According to him, "the rest came naturally, music and lyrics at once". He declared to have felt like another person after writing the song.

== Release and reception ==
Before being recorded, "Aquarela do Brasil", initially named "Aquarela brasileira", was performed by the baritone Cândido Botelho on Joujoux e Balangandans, a benefit concert sponsored by Darci Vargas, then the First Lady of Brazil. It was then recorded by Francisco de Morais Alves, arranged by Radamés Gnattali and his orchestra, and released by Odeon Records in August 1939. It was also recorded by Araci Cortes, but despite the singer's huge popularity at the time, the song was not a success.

"Aquarela do Brasil" took a while to succeed. In 1940, it was not among the top three songs of that year's Carnival in Rio. The president of the jury was Heitor Villa-Lobos, and Barroso, offended that his masterpiece was not on the list, ended his relationship with him. The two men would only speak to each other again fifteen years later, when both received the National Order of Merit.

The song only became famous after it was included in Walt Disney's 1942 animated film Saludos Amigos, sung by Aloísio de Oliveira. After that, the song became known not only in Brazil, but worldwide, becoming the first Brazilian song to be played over a million times on American radio. Due to the huge popularity achieved in the United States, it received an English version by songwriter Bob Russell.

It was voted by the Brazilian edition of Rolling Stone as the 12th greatest Brazilian song.

== Controversy ==
This song, because of its exaltation of Brazil's great qualities, marked the creation of a new genre within samba, known as samba-exaltação (exaltation samba). This musical movement, with its extremely patriotic nature, was seen by many as being favorable to the dictatorship of Getúlio Vargas, generating criticism towards Barroso and his work, which was perceived as Barroso's prostration to the regime. The Barroso family, however, strongly denies these claims, pointing out that he also wrote an anti-Nazi song named "Salada Mista" (Mixed salad), recorded by Carmen Miranda in October 1938.

The Department of Press and Propaganda, the official censorship body of the regime, wanted to censor the line "terra do samba e do pandeiro" ("land of samba and the pandeiro"), which was seen as being "derogatory" for Brazil's image. Barroso persuaded the censors to keep the line.

Some criticism of the song, at the time, was that it used expressions little known by the general public, such as "inzoneiro", "merencória", and "trigueiro" (intriguing, melancholic, and swarthy), and that he was too redundant in the verses "meu Brasil brasileiro" ("my Brazilian Brazil") and "esse coqueiro que dá coco" ("this coconut palm that produces coconut"). The composer defended his work, saying that these expressions were poetic effects inseparable from the original composition. On the original recording, Alves sang "mulato risoneiro" (laughing mulatto) instead of "inzoneiro" because he was unable to understand Barroso's illegible handwriting.

== Lyrics ==
Portuguese lyrics

Brasil, meu Brasil Brasileiro,
Meu mulato inzoneiro,
Vou cantar-te nos meus versos:
O Brasil, samba que dá,
Bamboleio, que faz gingar;
O Brasil do meu amor,
Terra de Nosso Senhor.
Brasil!... (Brasil!) Prá mim!... (Prá mim!...)
Ô, abre a cortina do passado;
Tira a mãe preta do cerrado;
Bota o rei congo no congado.
Brasil!... (Brasil!)
Deixa cantar de novo o trovador,
À merencória à luz da lua,
Toda canção do meu amor.
Quero ver essa Dona caminhando,
Pelos salões, arrastando,
O seu vestido rendado.
Brasil!... (Brasil!) Prá mim ... (Prá mim!...)
Brasil, terra boa e gostosa,
Da moreninha sestrosa,
De olhar indiferente.
O Brasil, verde que dá,
Para o mundo admirar.
O Brasil do meu amor,
Terra de Nosso Senhor.
Brasil!... (Brasil!) Prá mim ... (Prá mim!...)
Esse coqueiro que dá coco,
Onde eu amarro a minha rede,
Nas noites claras de luar.
Brasil!... (Brasil!...)
Ô! Estas fontes murmurantes,
Onde eu mato a minha sede,
E onde a lua vem brincar.
Ô! Esse Brasil lindo e trigueiro,
É o meu Brasil Brasileiro,
Terra de samba e pandeiro.
Brasil!... (Brasil!...) Prá mim!... (Prá mim!...)

English translation

Brazil, my Brazilian Brazil,
My intriguing mulatto,
I will sing you in my verses:
Brazil, samba that gives,
A swaying that makes you waddle;
Brazil of my love,
Land of our Lord.
Brazil! Brazil! For me! For me!
Oh, open the curtains of the past;
Take the black Mother from the cerrado;*
Put the Congo king in the congado.
Brazil! Brazil!
Let the minstrel sing again,
Under the melancholic moonlight,
All the songs of my love.
I want to see this lady walking,
Through the halls, dragging
Her garments made of lace.
Brazil! Brazil! For me! For me!
Brazil, beautiful and pleasant land,
Of the mischievous brunette little girl,
With her air of indifference.
Brazil, a greenness that is offered
For the admiration of the world.
Brazil of my love,
Land of our Lord.
Brazil! Brazil! For me! For me!
This coconut tree that gives coconuts,
Where I tie my hammock
In the bright moonlit nights.
Brazil! Brazil!
Oh! These murmuring fountains,
Where I quench my thirst,
And where the moon comes to play.
Oh! This Brazil, beautiful and swarthy,
Is my Brazilian Brazil,
Land of samba and tambourine,
Brazil! Brazil! For me! For me!

S. K. (Bob) Russell English Lyrics

(introduction)

Brazil ...
The Brazil that I knew
Where I wandered with you
Lives in my imagination

Where the songs are passionate
And a smile has flash in it
And a kiss has art in it
For you put your heart in it

And so I dream of old ...

(Most recordings start here)

Brazil ...

Where hearts were entertaining June
We stood beneath an amber moon
And softly murmurr'd "some day soon"
We kissed and clung together

Then
Tomorrow was another day
The morning found me miles away
With still a million things to say

Now
When twilight dims the sky above
Recalling thrills of our love
There's one thing I'm certain of

Return I will
To old Brazil

The Portuguese lyrics are as sung by Francisco Alves (chorus in brackets). The S. K. Russell English version is from the sheet music by Southern Music Publishing Company. The tune of the first four lines of the introduction is the same as the first instrumental break in the Alves version.

== Notable recordings ==
1942 Jimmy Dorsey recording on Decca, 18460B. 2008 Grammy Hall of Fame inductee.

The song has received many successful recordings through the years, being played in many different genres, ranging from its original samba genre to disco. It is one of the 20 most recorded songs of all time.

In 1943, Spanish-born bandleader Xavier Cugat reached number two on the Best Sellers List and number nine on the Harlem Hit Parade with his version of "Brazil". Django Reinhardt recorded "Brazil" three times between 1947 and 1953. In 1957, Frank Sinatra recorded the song in Come Fly With Me. He was followed by other successful artists of the time such as Bing Crosby, Ray Conniff, and Paul Anka.

During the Brazilian military dictatorship, MPB singer Elis Regina performed what is perhaps the darkest version ever of "Aquarela do Brasil", accompanied by a chorus of men reproducing chants of the Native Brazilians. In 1975, American band The Ritchie Family reached number-one on the Billboard Hot Dance Club Play chart for seven weeks and number eleven Pop with their disco version of the song.

"Brazil"

Single by The Ritchie Family

from the album Brazil
- B-side: "Hot Trip"
- Released: 1975
- Studio: Sigma Sound, Philadelphia, Pennsylvania
- Genre: Disco
- Length: 3:14 (7" version); 4:58 (Album version)
- Label: 20th Century
- Songwriter: Ary Barroso
- Producer: Jacques Morali

The Ritchie Family singles chronology
"Brazil" (1975)	"I Want to Dance with You (Dance with Me)" (1975)

Other successful Brazilian singers such as Antônio Carlos Jobim, Erasmo Carlos, João Gilberto (with Caetano Veloso, Gilberto Gil, and Maria Bethânia), Gal Costa, and Simone also recorded versions of the song at the same period.

The song was featured prominently in Terry Gilliam's 1985 film Brazil, which was named after it. It was recorded by Geoff Muldaur for the soundtrack, but parts of the song were also incorporated throughout the orchestral score by Michael Kamen, including a Kate Bush version. Afterwards, in the 1990s, it was recorded by both Harry Belafonte and Dionne Warwick.

In 2007, singer-songwriter Daniela Mercury, which recorded the most recent cover of the song by a Brazilian artist, was invited to perform the song at the end of the opening ceremony of the XV Pan American Games, held in Rio de Janeiro.

In 2009, the Recording Academy added the 1942 recording of "Brazil (Aquarela do Brasil)" by Jimmy Dorsey & His Orchestra, released as Decca 18460B, to the Grammy Hall of Fame. Jimmy Dorsey was the first to record the song on July 14, 1942, and release it with the English lyrics by Bob Russell sung by Bob Eberly and Helen O'Connell.

Also in 2009, American band Beirut performed "Brazil" for their live DVD Beirut: Live At The Music Hall Of Williamsburg.

ITV used a cover of this song by Thiago Thomé as the theme song for their coverage of the 2014 FIFA World Cup which took place in Brazil in June and July 2014. During the tournament's opening ceremony, its first verses were performed live by Brazilian singer Claudia Leitte before being joined onstage by Pitbull and Jennifer Lopez to sing "We Are One (Ole Ola)".

In 2021, the Michael Kamen (Brazil movie) arrangement was used by agency VCCP as the soundtrack for the Transport for London post-COVID advertising campaign, #LetsDoLondon.

Year	Artist	Album	Source
1939	Francisco de Morais Alves	Odeon 11768 (78 rpm record)	
1942	Sylvio Caldas	78 rpm record	
1942	Xavier Cugat	78 rpm record	
1947	Django Reinhardt	Quintette du Hot Club de France	
1957	Frank Sinatra	Come Fly With Me	
1958	The Coasters	The Coasters	
1963	Paul Anka	Our Man Around the World	
1968	Geoff & Maria Muldaur	Pottery Pie	
1974	Santana	Lotus (quoted in "Samba Pa Ti")	
1975	Crispy & Co.	Tonight at the Discotheque	
1975	The Ritchie Family	Brazil	
1976	Chet Atkins and Les Paul	Guitar Monsters	
1981	João Gilberto, Caetano Veloso and Gilberto Gil	Brasil	
1981	Tav Falco's Panther Burns	Behind The Magnolia Curtain	
1990	Harry Belafonte	Around the World with the Entertainers	
1991	Deborah Blando	A Different Story	
1997	Gal Costa	Acústico (Mtv)	
1998	Vengaboys	The Party Album	
2002	Cornelius	Point	
2002	Metrô	Déjà-Vu	
2005	Arcade Fire	"Cold Wind" (B-side) "Rebellion (Lies)" (B-side)	
2009	Beirut	Beirut: Live At The Music Hall Of Williamsburg (DVD)	
2009	The Spinto Band	Slim and Slender	
2014	Claudia Leitte	We Are One (World Cup Opening Ceremony Version)	
2014	Loona	Brazil	
2014	Bellini	Festival	
2016	Leslie Odom, Jr.	Leslie Odom, Jr.	

== Usage in popular culture ==
Films

Year	Film	Director
1942	Saludos Amigos	Walt Disney
1943	Gals, Incorporated (1943 film, Russel English lyrics)	Leslie Goodwins
1943	The Gang's All Here	Busby Berkeley
1944	The Three Caballeros	Walt Disney
1946	Notorious	Alfred Hitchcock
1947	Road to Rio	Norman Z. McLeod
1948	Sitting Pretty	Walter Lang
1954	A Star Is Born	George Cukor
1956	The Eddy Duchin Story	George Sidney
1961	A Difficult Life	Dino Risi
1963	Charley's Aunt	Géza von Cziffra
1976	Silent Movie	Mel Brooks
1980	Stardust Memories	Woody Allen
1985	Brazil	Terry Gilliam
1995	Carmen Miranda: Bananas is My Business	Helena Solberg
1998	There's Something About Mary	Farrelly brothers
1999	Three to Tango	Damon Santostefano
1999	Being John Malkovich (Trailer)	Spike Jonze
2003	Carandiru	Héctor Babenco
2003	Something's Gotta Give	Nancy Meyers
2004	The Aviator	Martin Scorsese
2007	Bee Movie (Trailer)	Simon J. Smith & Steve Hickner
2008	Australia	Baz Luhrmann
2008	WALL-E (Trailer)	Andrew Stanton
2014	Mr. Peabody & Sherman	Rob Minkoff
2017	My Scientology Movie (Trailer)	John Dower
2017	Star Wars: The Last Jedi	Rian Johnson
2018	The Grinch	Scott Mosier & Yarrow Cheney

Television programs

Year	TV Series	Episode
1962	The Jetsons	Las Venus – Solar Sambaramba
1966	The Andy Griffith Show	Season 7 – Episode 20:Andy's Old Girlfriend
1966–1967	Dark Shadows	Played at The Blue Whale bar
1982	SCTV	Series 5, Cycle 4 – Towering Inferno with Banda Brava (Words To Live By segment)
1995	Duckman	Season 2 – Episode 8: "Research and Destroy"
2002	The Simpsons	"Blame It on Lisa"
2004	Miss Marple	"The Body in the Library"
2007	Vidas Opostas	Theme song
2008	Eli Stone	Theme song and during episode previews
2011	Let's Dance	Episode 5 – Bernd Herzsprung's Samba
