= Eartha Kitt =

American singer and actress (1927–2008)

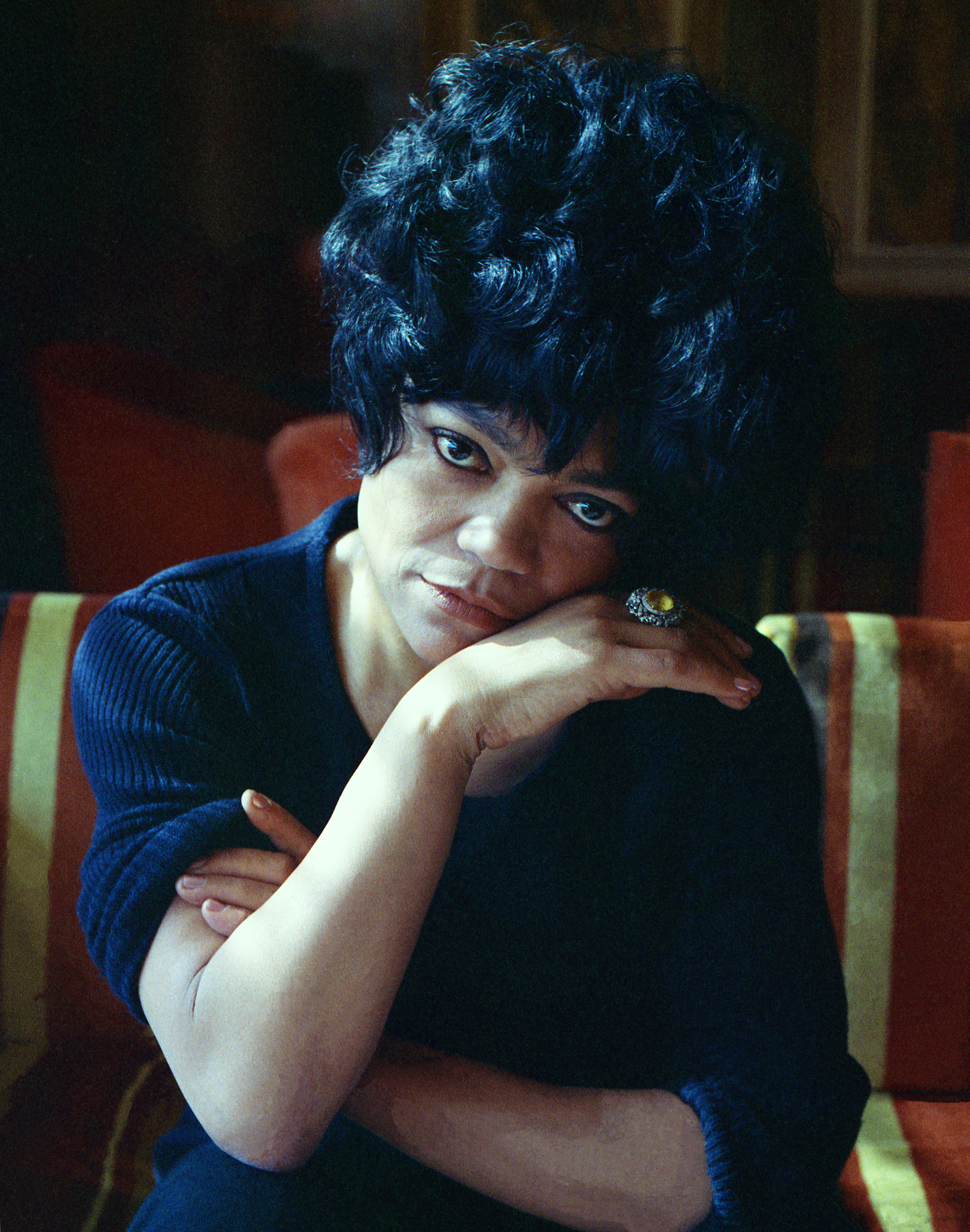
- Kitt in 1973
- Born: Eartha Mae Keith; January 17, 1927; North, South Carolina, U.S.
- Died: December 25, 2008 (aged 81); Weston, Connecticut, U.S.
- Other names: Mother Eartha, Kitty
- Occupations: Singer; actress; comedian; dancer; songwriter; activist
- Years active: 1944–2008
- Spouse: John W. McDonald (m. 1960; div. 1964)
- Children: 1
- Musical career
- Genres: Vocal jazz; cabaret; dance; Country music; disco
- Labels: RCA Victor; Kapp; MGM; EMI; GNP Crescendo; Decca; Spark; Can't Stop; Ariola; ITM; DRG; Strike Force; His Master's Voice

Eartha Mae Kitt (née Keith; January 17, 1927 – December 25, 2008) was an American singer, songwriter, and actress. She was known for her highly distinctive singing style and her 1953 recordings of "C'est si bon" and the Christmas novelty song "Santa Baby".

Kitt began her career with the Katherine Dunham Company and appeared in the 1945 original Broadway theatre production of the musical Carib Song. In the early 1950s, Kitt had six US Top 30 entries, including "Uska Dara" (1953) and "I Want to Be Evil" (1953). Her other recordings include the UK Top 10 song "Under the Bridges of Paris" (1954), "Just an Old Fashioned Girl" (1956) and "Where Is My Man" (1983). Orson Welles once called her the "most exciting woman in the world". Kitt starred as Catwoman in the third and final season of the television series Batman in 1967.

In 1968, Kitt's career in the U.S. deteriorated after she made anti-Vietnam War statements at a White House luncheon with Lady Bird Johnson, the wife of President Lyndon B. Johnson. Ten years later, Kitt made a successful return to Broadway in the 1978 original production of the musical Timbuktu!, for which she received the first of her two Tony Award nominations. Kitt's second was for the 2000 original production of the musical The Wild Party. She wrote three autobiographies.

Kitt found a new generation of fans through her various voice acting roles in the last decade of her life. She was the voice of two villainous characters in animated works during the twenty-first century: Yzma in The Emperor's New Groove franchise, and Vexus in My Life As A Teenage Robot, with the former role earning her two Daytime Emmy Awards. Kitt posthumously won a third Emmy in 2010 for her guest performance on Wonder Pets!.

== Early life ==
Eartha Mae Keith was born on January 17, 1927, in North, South Carolina. She did not learn her exact birth date until later in life, when she challenged students at Benedict College in Columbia, South Carolina, to locate her birth certificate; they succeeded in finding it.

Her mother, Annie Mae Keith, was of Cherokee and African-American descent. Kitt knew little about her father. According to accounts of her early life, he was rumored to have been the son of the plantation owner where she was born, and her conception was alleged to have resulted from rape. In a 2013 biography, British journalist John Williams identified her father as Daniel Sturkie, a white local physician. Kitt's daughter, Kitt Shapiro (née McDonald), has questioned the accuracy of this claim.

Her mother went to live with a Black man who refused to accept Kitt because of her relatively light complexion. Kitt was raised by a relative known as Aunt Rosa, in whose household she experienced abuse. In a 1971 interview on BBC Wales's Late Call, she recalled periods of severe food deprivation: "I remember at times when we didn't have anything to eat for what seemed like an insurmountable amount of time. We had to rely on the forest and whatever we could dig out of the ground, such as weeds or a grass I remember that had a kind of onion growing at the bottom of it." Reflecting on the lasting influence of her childhood, she added, "I'm very glad that [her childhood self] will always be a part of me because she helps me do what she knows I have to do out there on that stage."

After Annie Mae's death, Kitt was sent to live with another relative, Mamie Kitt, in Harlem, New York City. Kitt later came to believe that Mamie was her biological mother. She attended Metropolitan Vocational High School in New York City.

In the summer of 1944, Kitt left school at the age of 17 and traveled to upstate New York, where she worked as a farmerette, one of the women recruited to perform agricultural labor during World War II. Her work included harvesting cherries and currants. She enjoyed the experience, which drew on a lifelong enthusiasm for horticulture rooted in her childhood in South Carolina.

== Career ==
=== Katherine Dunham Company and rise to fame ===
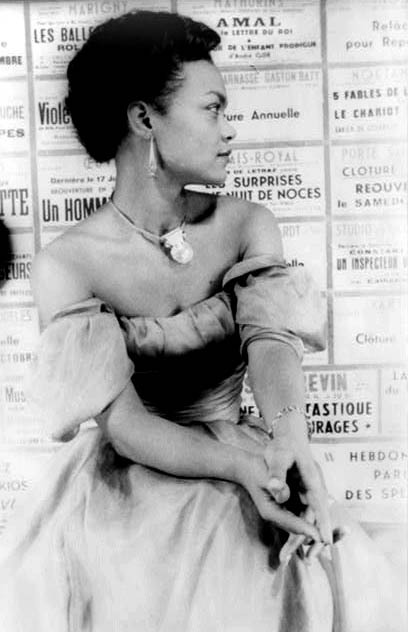
Kitt photographed by Carl Van Vechten, 1952

Kitt returned to New York City in September 1944 and auditioned for the Katherine Dunham Company, the first African American modern dance company in the United States. She was awarded a scholarship, which included a stipend of $10 a week.

In 1945, after six months of training at the Katherine Dunham School of Dance, Kitt made her professional debut as a dancer with the company in the Broadway variety show Blue Holiday. Around the same time, she auditioned for the Katherine Dunham Company, whose leading members were appearing in another Broadway production at the Ziegfeld Theatre. According to fellow dancer Van Aikens, Kitt was initially turned down and left the stage in tears. However, she and her friend Roxie were placed on a waiting list until the company could expand.

Dunham secured a Broadway engagement for Carib Song, a new production that incorporated dialogue and songs alongside dance. Kitt was added to the company, which opened at the Adelphi Theatre on September 24, 1945. Her vocal ability quickly distinguished her as a performer. Aikens recalled that Dunham particularly admired Kitt's voice and that she regularly sang at the company's annual Boule Blanche (White Ball). Kitt toured the United States with the Katherine Dunham Company for the next several years. In 1948, the troupe traveled to London and subsequently toured Europe. Kitt remained in Paris in 1949, where she established herself as a nightclub performer.

=== International stardom ===
In March 1950, the New Pittsburgh Courier reported that Kitt had become a popular attraction at an upscale Paris nightclub, performing Afro-Cuban songs and incorporating rumba movements into her act. The newspaper mentioned her radio and television appearances and concert performances with American jazz musicians, including Coleman Hawkins, Buck Clayton, and Doc Cheatham. She was also compared to African American entertainer Josephine Baker whose career thrived in Paris, "Perhaps taking up for this generation where the great Josephine Baker left off, Eartha is a great favorite with the male entertainment seeker."

In 1950, Orson Welles cast her as Helen in his staging of The Blessed and the Damned in Paris. She gained wider recognition in the Broadway revue New Faces of 1952, in which she introduced "Monotonous" and "Bal, Petit Bal." A film adaptation, New Faces, was released by 20th Century-Fox in 1954, featuring Kitt performing "Monotonous," "Uska Dara," "C'est si bon," and "Santa Baby."

Kitt's distinctive voice and multilingual performances helped establish her international career. While performing in Europe, she became fluent in French; she spoke four languages and sang in seven.

Her recordings included "Let's Do It," "Champagne Taste," "C'est si bon," "Just an Old Fashioned Girl," "Je cherche un homme," "Love for Sale," "I'd Rather Be Burned as a Witch," "Kâtibim," "Mink, Schmink," and "Under the Bridges of Paris." Her best-known recording, "Santa Baby," was released in 1953. In 1956, she published her autobiography, Thursday's Child, which later inspired the title of David Bowie's 1999 song of the same name.

Kitt in Amsterdam, 1962

During the 1950s, Kitt also appeared in films, including The Mark of the Hawk (1957), St. Louis Blues (1958), and Anna Lucasta (1958). Her stage credits during this period included Mrs. Patterson (1954–1955), Shinbone Alley (1957), and Jolly's Progress (1959).

Kitt continued to perform internationally in the 1960s. At the Royal Variety Performance at the London Palladium on October 29, 1962, she sang solo and appeared in a sketch with Harry Secombe; The Illustrated London News described them as "perhaps the two outstanding performers of the evening." In 1963, she performed at the Araneta Coliseum in the Philippines, where she learned the song "Waray-Waray" phonetically and later included it in her repertoire and a live album. The following year, she helped open the Circle Star Theater in San Carlos, California.

Throughout her career, Kitt was frequently described in feline terms, with critics likening her voice to a purr and characterizing her stage presence as that of a "sex kitten." In 1967, she took over the role of Catwoman in the television series Batman from Julie Newmar. That year, she also appeared as Tina Mara, a contortionist, in an episode of Mission: Impossible titled "The Traitor."

=== Career decline and resurgence ===
In 1968, Kitt attended a White House luncheon where she discussed the Vietnam War with First Lady Lady Bird Johnson. Kitt criticized the war and subsequently faced professional repercussions, with bookings reportedly declining and her career in the United States curtailed. She spent much of the following decade performing in Europe.

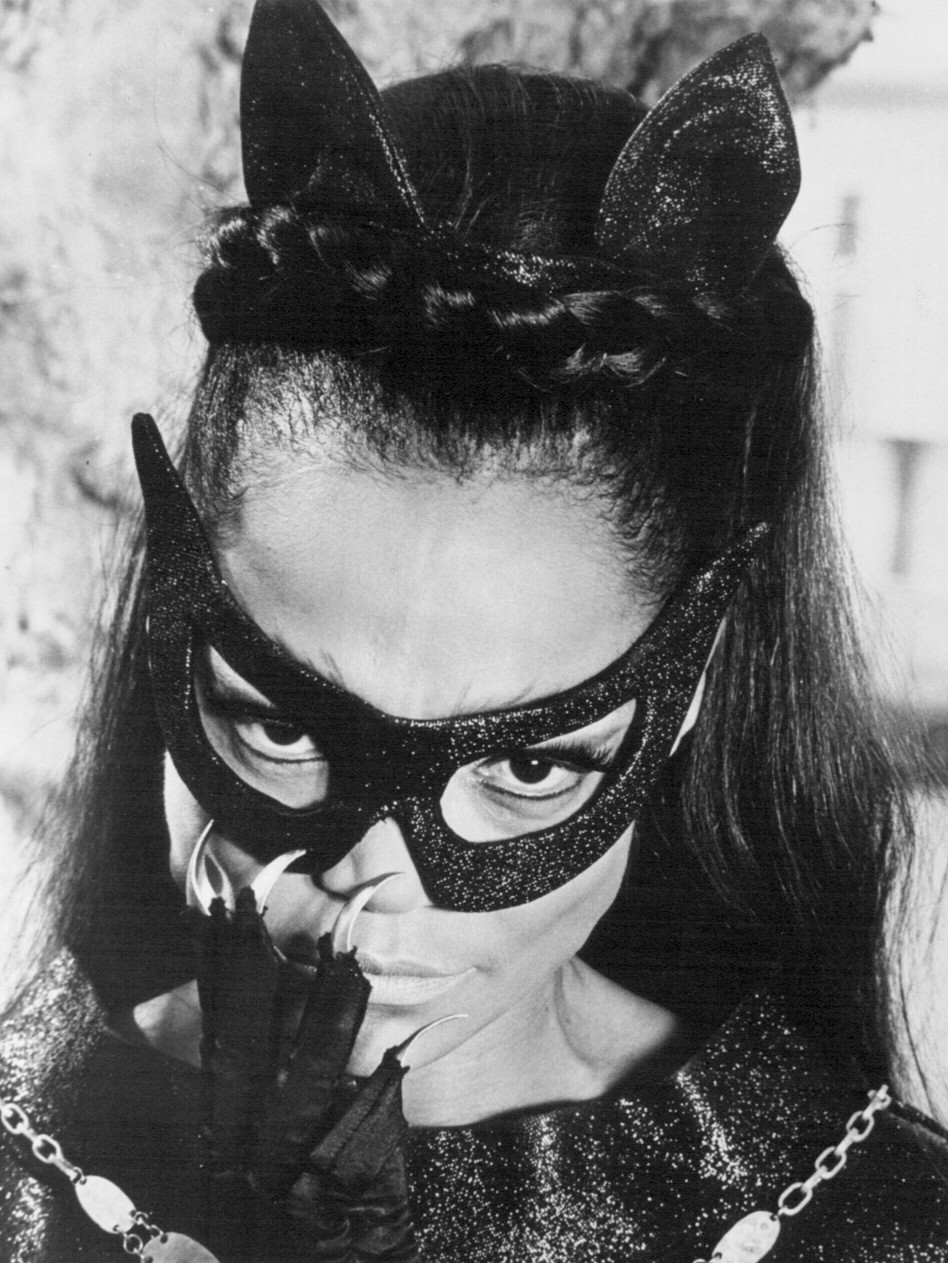
Kitt as Catwoman in the Batman TV series, 1967

In 1970, Kitt filmed a television special for Group W Films, with filming taking place in nine European cities during May and June. Throughout the 1970s, she continued to perform on television and the concert stage, including appearances on the BBC variety show The Good Old Days.

In 1976, Kitt published her second book Alone with Me: A New Autobiography.

In 1978, Kitt returned to Broadway in Timbuktu!, an African-set adaptation of Kismet, earning a nomination for the Tony Award for Best Actress in a Musical. Kitt did the voice-over in a television commercial for the album Aja by the rock group Steely Dan.

Kitt returned to the music charts in 1984 with "Where Is My Man", a disco single that became her first gold record. It reached No. 36 on the UK singles chart and No. 7 on the US Billboard dance chart. The single was followed by the album I Love Men. The success introduced her to a new generation of nightclub audiences, particularly gay men, and she frequently performed at benefits for HIV/AIDS organizations.

In 1987, Kitt replaced Dolores Gray as Carlotta in the London West End production of Stephen Sondheim's Follies. Her performance of "I'm Still Here" received standing ovations, and she subsequently performed a solo show at the Shaftesbury Theatre in early 1989. That year, her single "Cha-Cha Heels," recorded with Bronski Beat, reached No. 32 on the UK singles chart. She also published her memoir I'm Still Here: Confessions of a Sex Kitten.

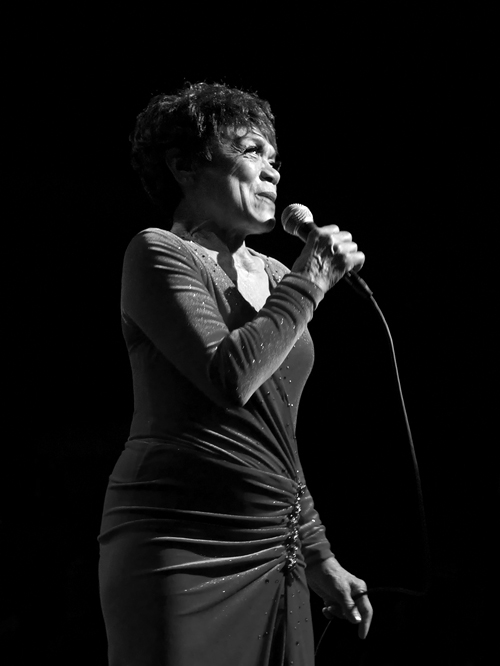
Kitt performing in concert, 2007

Kitt continued to work in film and television, appearing as Old Lady Hackmore in Ernest Scared Stupid (1991), Lady Eloise in Boomerang (1992), Agatha K. Plummer in Harriet the Spy (1996), and Madame Zeroni in Holes (2003). In 1992, she had a supporting role as Lady Eloise in Boomerang. In 1995, Kitt appeared as herself in an episode of The Nanny, where she performed a song in French and flirted with Maxwell Sheffield. In November 1996, Kitt appeared in an episode of Celebrity Jeopardy!. She also did a series of commercials for Old Navy.

In 1998, Kitt toured North America with the production of The Wizard of Oz as the Wicked Witch of the West. She appeared in the Broadway production of The Wild Party in 2000, which earned her a Tony Award nomination. Her later stage credits included Cinderella as the Fairy Godmother in 2000 and 2004, Nine in 2003, and the off-Broadway musical Mimi le Duck in 2006.

She also became known for her voice acting, playing Kaa in a 1994 BBC Radio adaptation of The Jungle Book and Bagheera in the 1998 film The Jungle Book: Mowgli's Story. In 2000, Kitt won an Annie Award for voicing Yzma in Disney's The Emperor's New Groove, a role she reprised in Kronk's New Groove and The Emperor's New School. Her work on the latter earned her two Daytime Emmy Awards. She did further voice work as Vexus in Nickelodeon's My Life as a Teenage Robot. In December 2004 and 2005, Kitt was a guest narrator at Disney's Candlelight Processional at Walt Disney World.

During her late career resurgence, Kitt published her memoir Rejuvenate!: It's Never Too Late. She continued to perform in cabaret venues in New York, including the Café Carlyle, and appeared at the Cheltenham Jazz Festival in April 2008. She also recorded a new version of "Smoke Gets in Your Eyes" for MAC Cosmetics' 2007 Smoke Signals collection and appeared in the film And Then Came Love that year. Her final voice performances included an appearance as herself in The Simpsons episode "Once Upon a Time in Springfield", which aired in 2010.

== Controversy ==
On January 18, 1968, during the administration of U.S. president Lyndon B. Johnson, Kitt attended a White House luncheon where she criticized the Vietnam War during a question-and-answer session with First Lady Lady Bird Johnson. Asked about the war and the growing youth protest movement, Kitt challenged the administration's policies, saying: "You send the best of this country off to be shot and maimed. No wonder the kids rebel and take pot." During a question-and-answer session, Kitt stated:

The children of America are not rebelling for no reason. They are not hippies for no reason at all. We don't have what we have on Sunset Blvd. for no reason. They are rebelling against something. There are so many things burning the people of this country, particularly mothers. They feel they are going to raise sons—and I know what it's like, and you have children of your own, Mrs. Johnson—we raise children and send them to war.

Kitt's remarks reportedly caused Lady Bird Johnson to burst into tears. The incident damaged Kitt's professional standing in the United States, and she subsequently concentrated on performing in Europe and Asia.

In 1975, investigative journalist Seymour Hersh discovered a Central Intelligence Agency dossier on Kitt and reported on it in The New York Times. The dossier included details of her family history and sex life, as well as disparaging assessments attributed to former colleagues. It characterized Kitt as a "sadistic nymphomaniac." Kitt condemned the dossier, saying, "I don't understand what this is about. I think it's disgusting."

In February 2022, the short documentary Catwoman vs. the White House, directed by Scott Calonico, examined the luncheon incident through photographs, press clippings, and archival footage.

Kitt returned to the White House on January 29, 1978, when she accepted an invitation from President Jimmy Carter to attend a reception marking the tenth anniversary of the reopening of Ford's Theatre.

== Personal life ==
Kitt and her daughter, Kitt McDonald, arriving in Finland, 1970

Kitt married John William McDonald, an associate of a real estate investment company, on June 9, 1960. Their daughter, Kitt McDonald, was born on November 26, 1961, and was baptized Catholic at Blessed Sacrament Catholic Church. Eartha Kitt and McDonald separated on July 1, 1963, and divorced on March 26, 1964.

It was reported that Kitt spent time with French actor Jean Marais early in her career. Although rumors later circulated that she and Welles had an affair during Shinbone Alley, Kitt denied them in a 2001 interview with George Wayne for Vanity Fair saying, "It was a working situation and nothing else."

A longtime Connecticut resident, Kitt lived in a converted barn on a sprawling farm in the Merryall section of New Milford for many years and was active in local charities and causes throughout Litchfield County. She later moved to Pound Ridge, New York, but returned in 2002 to the southern Fairfield County, Connecticut town of Weston, in order to be near her daughter Kitt and family. Her daughter, Kitt, married Charles Lawrence Shapiro in 1987.

== Activism ==
Kitt was involved in social and political causes from the 1950s onward, including youth programs, peace activism, and LGBT rights. In 1966, she established the Kittsville Youth Foundation, a chartered nonprofit organization serving underprivileged young people in the Watts area of Los Angeles.

Kitt also supported Rebels with a Cause, a group of young people in Anacostia, Washington, D.C., who worked to clean up their neighborhood and establish recreational facilities. In May 1967, she accompanied members of the group when they testified before the House General Subcommittee on Education of the Committee on Education and Labor. Kitt praised their accomplishments, arguing that in one year, despite limited funding, they had achieved what established community leaders had not. She maintained that the group could serve as a model for other urban communities facing similar problems. The group subsequently received the funding it had sought.

Kitt was a member of the Women's International League for Peace and Freedom. Her opposition to the Vietnam War, expressed during a 1968 White House luncheon, reflected her concerns about the relationship between the war, poverty, and racial unrest. The Central Intelligence Agency had maintained a file on Kitt since 1956. After The New York Times reported on the file in 1975, Kitt gave the newspaper permission to publish portions of it, stating, "I have nothing to be afraid of and I have nothing to hide."

Kitt later became an outspoken supporter of LGBT rights and same-sex marriage, which she regarded as a civil right. Explaining her support for marriage equality, she said, "If I have a partner and something happens to me, I want that partner to enjoy the benefits of what we have reaped together. It's a civil-rights thing, isn't it?"

She also appeared at numerous LGBT fundraisers, including a large event in Baltimore with George Burns and Jimmy James. As part of the performance, James impersonated Kitt before she appeared onstage to take the microphone, prompting a standing ovation. Scott Sherman, an agent at Atlantic Entertainment Group, praised her participation, saying that Kitt “appears at so many LGBT events in support of civil rights.” In a 1992 interview with Dr. Anthony Clare, Kitt spoke about her gay following, saying:

We're all rejected people, we know what it is to be refused, we know what it is to be oppressed, depressed, and then, accused, and I am very much cognizant of that feeling. Nothing in the world is more painful than rejection. I am a rejected, oppressed person, and so I understand them, as best as I can, even though I am a heterosexual.

== Death ==
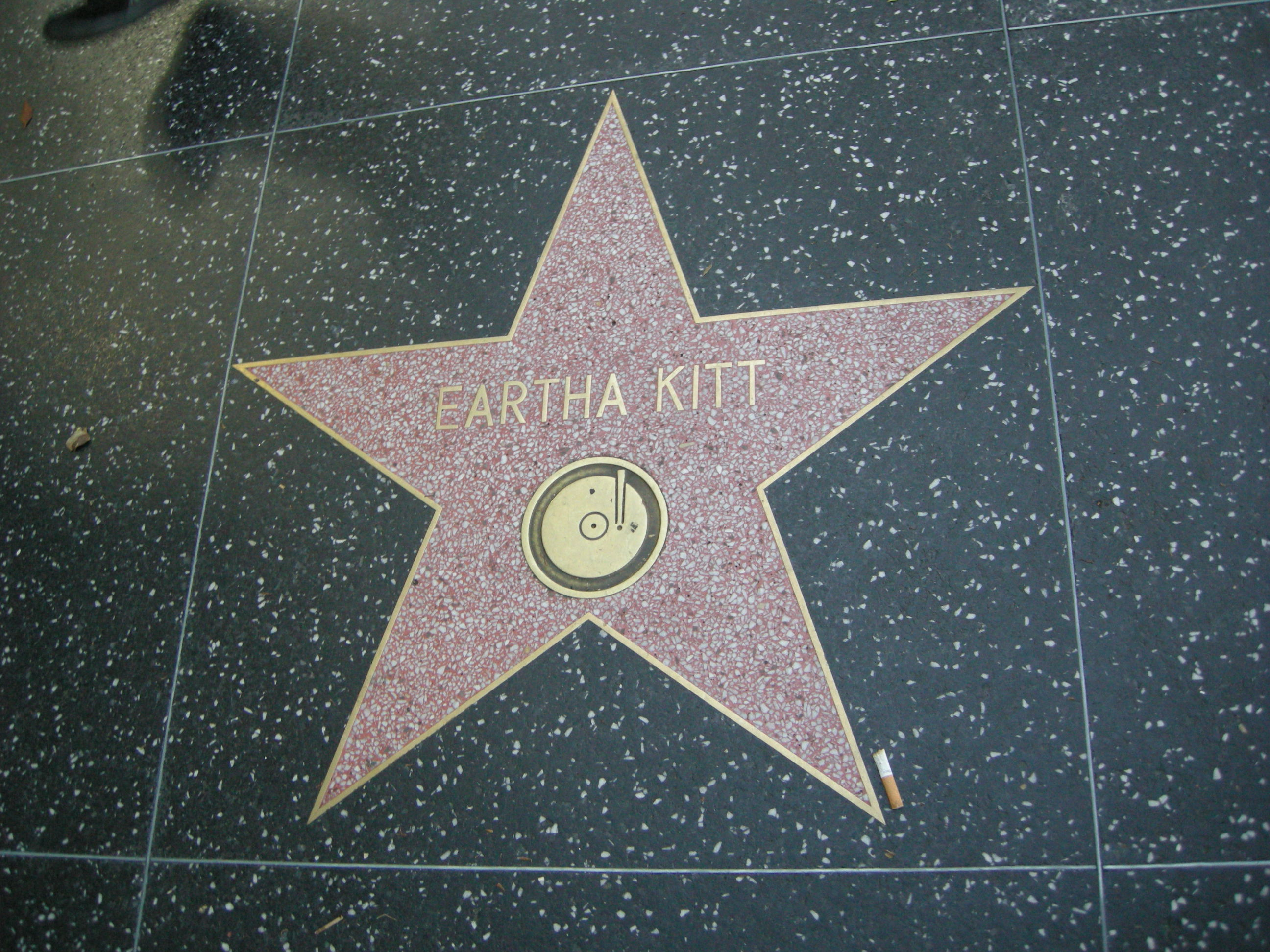
Kitt's star on the Hollywood Walk of Fame

Kitt died of colon cancer on Christmas Day 2008 at her home in Weston, Connecticut, aged 81. She was survived by her daughter, Kitt Shapiro, and two grandchildren.

In a 2013 interview, Shapiro recalled being with her mother during her final days at home. "She left this world literally screaming at the top of her lungs," she said, adding, "She screamed her way out of here, literally." Shapiro described their final days as intimate and affectionate, saying, "I was the love of her life, so the last part of her life we didn't have to have these heart to heart talks."

== Legacy ==
Commemorative blue plaque at Riverside Studios in London

In February 1960, Kitt was honored with a star on the Hollywood Walk of Fame. It is located at 6656 Hollywood Boulevard.

In 2016, January 17 was announced as Eartha Kitt Day in Kitt's home state of South Carolina. In 2022 the day was enshrined into state law in SC Code § 53-3-75 (2022). South Carolinian Sheldon Rice is credited for beginning the push for legislation declaring her birthday as a state holiday since the time of her death in 2008. State Rep. Gilda Cobb-Hunter first introduced the legislation to create the State holiday in 2011.

In March 2024, Kitt was honored with the unveiling of a commemorative blue plaque at Riverside Studios in Hammersmith, London, as part of the London Borough of Hammersmith and Fulham's Women's History Month celebrations.

== Awards and nominations ==
Year	Award	Category	Nominated work	Result	Ref.
2001	Annie Awards	Best Voice Acting by a Female Performer in an Animated Feature Production	The Emperor's New Groove	Won	
2006	Annie Awards	Best Voice Acting in an Animated Television Production	The Emperor's New School (Episode: "Kuzclone")	Won	
2007	Annie Awards	Best Voice Acting in an Animated Television Production	The Emperor's New School (Episode: "The Emperor's New Musical")	Won	
2001	Black Reel Awards	Best Supporting Actress	The Emperor's New Groove	Nominated	
2007	Daytime Emmy Awards	Outstanding Performer in an Animated Program	The Emperor's New School	Won	
2008	Daytime Emmy Awards	Outstanding Performer in an Animated Program	The Emperor's New School	Won	
2010	Daytime Emmy Awards	Outstanding Performer in an Animated Program	Wonder Pets! (Episode: "Save the Cool Cat and the Hip Hippo")	Won	
2000	Drama Desk Awards	Outstanding Featured Actress in a Musical	The Wild Party	Nominated	
2005	DVD Exclusive Awards	Best Animated Character Performance (Voice and Animation in a DVD Premiere Movie)	Kronk's New Groove	Nominated	
1969	Grammy Awards	Best Recording for Children	Folk Tales of the Tribes of Africa	Nominated	
1995	Grammy Awards	Best Traditional Pop Vocal Performance	Back in Business	Nominated	
1995	NAACP Image Awards	Outstanding Supporting Actress in a Comedy Series	Living Single (Episode: "He Works Hard for the Money")	Nominated	
1966	Primetime Emmy Awards	Outstanding Single Performance by an Actress in a Leading Role in a Drama	I Spy (Episode: "The Loser")	Nominated	
1978	Tony Awards	Best Leading Actress in a Musical	Timbuktu!	Nominated	
2000	Tony Awards	Best Featured Actress in a Musical	The Wild Party	Nominated	

== Discography ==
Studio albums

- RCA Victor Presents Eartha Kitt (1953)
- That Bad Eartha (1954)
- Down to Eartha (1955)
- That Bad Eartha (1956)
- Thursday's Child (1957)
- St. Louis Blues (1958)
- The Fabulous Eartha (1959)
- Revisited (1960)
- Bad But Beautiful (1962)
- The Romantic Eartha (1962)
- Love for Sale (1965)
- Canta en Castellano (1965)
- Sentimental Eartha (1970)
- I Love Men (1984)
- I'm Still Here (1989)
- Thinking Jazz (1991)
- Back in Business (1994)

== Filmography ==
=== Film ===
Year	Film	Role	Notes
1948	Casbah	Uncredited	
1951	Parigi è sempre Parigi	Herself	
1954	New Faces	Herself	
1957	The Mark of the Hawk	Renee	
1958	St. Louis Blues	Gogo Germaine	
1958	Anna Lucasta	Anna Lucasta	
1961	Saint of Devil's Island	Annette	
1965	Uncle Tom's Cabin	Singer	Uncredited role
1965	Synanon	Betty	
1971	Up the Chastity Belt	Scheherazade	
1975	Friday Foster	Madame Rena	
1979	Butterflies in Heat	Lola	
1985	The Serpent Warriors	Snake Priestess	
1987	Master of Dragonard Hill	Naomi	
1987	Dragonard	Naomi	
1987	The Pink Chiquitas	Betty / The Meteor	Voice role
1989	Erik the Viking	Freya	
1990	Living Doll	Mrs. Swartz	
1991	Ernest Scared Stupid	Old Lady Hackmore	
1992	Boomerang	Lady Eloise	
1993	Fatal Instinct	First Trial Judge	
1996	Harriet the Spy	Agatha K. Plummer	
1997	Ill Gotten Gains	The Wood	Voice role
1998	I Woke Up Early the Day I Died	Cult Leader	
1998	The Jungle Book: Mowgli's Story	Bagheera	Voice role
2000	The Emperor's New Groove	Yzma	Voice role
2002	Anything But Love	Herself	
2003	Holes	Madame Zeroni	
2005	Preaching to the Choir	Ms. Nettie	
2005	Kronk's New Groove	Yzma	Voice role; direct-to-video
2007	And Then Came Love	Mona	

=== Television ===
Year	Title	Role	Notes
1952–1963	The Ed Sullivan Show	Herself	15 episodes
1963–1978	The Tonight Show Starring Johnny Carson	Herself	8 episodes
1964–1979	The Mike Douglas Show	Herself	16 episodes
1965	I Spy	Angel	Episode: "The Loser"
1965	Ben Casey	Danielle Taylor	Episode: "A Horse Named Stravinsky" (4.31; 5/17/1965)
1965	The Eartha Kitt Show	Herself	
1967	Mission: Impossible	Tina Mara	Episode: "The Traitor"
1967–1968	Batman	Selina Kyle / Catwoman	5 episodes
1969	The Dick Cavett Show	Herself	1 episode
1972	Lieutenant Schuster's Wife	Lady	Television film
1973–1978	The Merv Griffin Show	Herself	3 episodes
1974	The Protectors	Carrie Blaine	Episode: "A Pocketful of Posies"
1978	Police Woman	Amelia	Episode: "Tigress"
1978	To Kill a Cop	Paula	Television film
1983	A Night on the Town	Unknown role	Television film
1985	Miami Vice	Santería Priestess Chata	Episode: "Whatever Works"
1989	After Dark	Herself	Episode: "Rock Bottom?" (Note: Extended appearance on British discussion programme, together with Simon Napier-Bell and Pat Kane among others)
1993	Jack's Place	Isabel Lang	Episode: "The Seventh Meal"
1993	Matrix	Sister Rowena	Episode: "Moths to a Flame"
1994	Space Ghost Coast to Coast	Herself	Episode: "Batmantis"
1995	The Magic School Bus	Mrs. Franklin	Voice role; Episode: "Going Batty"
1995	New York Undercover	Mrs. Stubbs	Episode: "Student Affairs"
1995	Living Single	Jacqueline Richards	Episode: "He Works Hard for the Money"
1996	The Nanny	Herself	Episode: "A Pup in Paris"
1997	The Chris Rock Show	Herself	1 episode
1997–2000	The Rosie O'Donnell Show	Herself	2 episodes
1998	The Wild Thornberrys	Lioness #1	Voice role; Episode: "Flood Warning"
1999	The Famous Jett Jackson	Albertine Whethers	Episode: "Field of Dweebs"
2000	Happily Ever After: Fairy Tales for Every Child	The Snow Queen	Voice role; Episode: "The Snow Queen"
2000	Welcome to New York	June	2 episodes
2001	The Feast of All Saints	Lola Dede	Television film
2001	Santa, Baby!	Emerald	Voice role; Television film
2002–2006	My Life as a Teenage Robot	Queen Vexus	Voice role; 7 episodes
2003	Hollywood Squares	Herself	5 episodes
2005	Larry King Live	Herself	2 episodes
2006–2008	The Emperor's New School	Yzma	Main cast; Voice role
2007	American Dad!	Fortune Teller	Voice role; Episode: "Dope and Faith"
2008	An Evening with Eartha Kitt	Herself	Hosted by Gwen Ifill for PBS
2009	Wonder Pets!	Cool Cat	Voice role; Episode: "Save the Cool Cat and the Hip Hippo"; aired posthumously
2010	The Simpsons	Herself	Voice role; "Once Upon a Time in Springfield"; aired posthumously

=== Documentary ===
Year	Film	Role
1982	All by Myself: The Eartha Kitt Story	Herself
1995	Unzipped	Herself
2002	The Making and Meaning of We Are Family	Herself
2002	The Sweatbox (unreleased)	Herself

=== Stage work ===
Year	Title	Location	Role	Notes
1945	Blue Holiday	Broadway	Performer	(Note: as a member of the Katherine Dunham Troupe; a short-lived production at the Belasco Theatre)
1945	Carib Song	Broadway	Company	(Note: as a member of the Katherine Dunham Troupe; performed at the Adelphi Theatre as an Original Broadway production)
1946	Bal Nègre	Broadway, and Europe	Performer	(Note: as a member of the Katherine Dunham Troupe; widely acclaimed Concert at the Belasco Theatre)
1946	unknown	Mexico	Performer	(Note: performed successfully as a member of the Katherine Dunham Troupe which was under contract with Teatro Americano for more than two months at the request of Doris Duke)
1948	Caribbean Rhapsody	West End, and Paris	Chorus girl	(Note: as a member of the Katherine Dunham Troupe; performed at the Prince of Wales Theatre (West End) and Théâtre des Champs-Élysées (Paris))
1949–1950	unknown	Paris	Herself, Performer	(Note: first solo show / leading performance; performed at Carroll's Niterie; is where Orson Welles discovered her)
1950	Time Runs	Paris	Helen of Troy	(Note: In segment based on Faust; performed "Hungry Little Trouble" written by Duke Ellington; cast by Orson Welles)
1950	An Evening With Orson Welles	Frankfurt	Helen of Troy	(Note: In segment based on Faust; performed "Hungry Little Trouble" written by Duke Ellington; cast by Orson Welles)
1951	Dr. Faustus	Paris	Helen of Troy	with Orson Welles
1952	New Faces of 1952	Broadway	Polynesian girl, Featured dancer, Featured singer	
1954	Mrs. Patterson	Broadway	Theodora (Teddy) Hicks	Original Broadway production
1957	Shinbone Alley	Broadway	Mehitabel	Original Broadway production
1959	Jolly's Progress	Broadway	Jolly Rivers	
1965	The Owl and the Pussycat	U.S. National tour	Performer	
1967	Peg	Regional (US)		
1970	The High Bid	London	Performer	
1972	Bunny	London	Performer	
1974	Bread and Beans and Things	Aquarius Theater	Performer	
1976	A Musical Jubilee	U.S. National tour	Performer	
1978	Timbuktu!	Broadway	Shaleem-La-Lume	
1980	Cowboy and the Legend	Regional (US)	Performer	
1982	New Faces of 1952 (Revival)	Off-off-Broadway	Polynesian girl Featured dancer Featured singer	
1985	Blues in the Night	U.S. National tour	Performer	
1987	Follies (London Revival)	London	Carlotta Campion	Replacement for Dolores Gray
1989	Aladdin	Palace Theatre, Manchester	Slave of the Ring	
1989	Eartha Kitt in Concert	London	Performer	
1994	Yes	Edinburgh	Performer	
1995	Sam's Song	Unitarian Church of All Souls	Performer	Benefit concert
1996	Lady Day at Emerson's Bar and Grill	Chicago	Billie Holiday	
1998	The Wizard of Oz (return engagement)	Madison Square Garden, and U.S. National tour	Miss Gulch/The Wicked Witch	
2000	The Wild Party	Broadway	Delores	Original Broadway production
2000	Cinderella	Madison Square Garden, and U.S. National tour	Fairy Godmother	
2003	Nine	Broadway	Liliane La Fleur	Replacement for Chita Rivera
2004	Cinderella (New York City Opera revival)	David H. Koch Theater	Fairy Godmother	
2006	Mimi le Duck	Off-off-Broadway	Madame Vallet	
2007	All About Us	Westport Country Playhouse	Performer	

=== Video games ===
Year	Title	Role	Notes
2000	The Emperor's New Groove	Yzma	voice role

== Notes ==
Batman role
Preceded by Julie Newmar	Catwoman actress 1967–1968	Succeeded by Michelle Pfeiffer
