= The Ritchie Family =

American vocal group

- Origin: Philadelphia, U.S.
- Genres: Disco; funk
- Years active: 1975–1984; 2013–present
- Labels: RCA; Marlin
- Members: Cassandra Wooten; Cheryl Mason-Dorman; Renee Guilory-Wearing
- Past members: Gwendolyn Oliver; Jacqui Smith-Lee; Theodosia 'Dodie' Draher; Ednah Holt; Vera Brown; Linda James

The Ritchie Family are an American vocal group based in Philadelphia that achieved several hits during the disco era. They have reunited and continue to perform. Their latest single "Whatcha Got" was released in 2021.

== Background ==
The three original members were not related; the group was a creation of Jacques Morali who also formed the Village People. The group took its name from record producer Richie Rome, who added a T to the name; it originally consisted of three singers: Cassandra Ann Wooten and Gwendolyn Oliver (who eventually married musician Fred Wesley) of the girl group Honey & the Bees, and Cheryl Mason Jacks. Their manager was Jimmy Bishop, a successful Philadelphia radio personality who also managed Barbara Mason. Morali remembered Wooten and Oliver had done some session work for him, and he called them a few years later when he wanted to form a group and the Ritchie Family was born.

Following Brazil, they had success with the Arabian Nights album. Their follow up albums Life Is Music, which followed a 1930s theme, and African Queens were only mediocre successes. Each of these four albums was a concept album featuring songs of a similar theme as suggested by each album title. Each album also featured a long medley, usually running from 15 to 20 minutes.

== Career: Original line up ==
=== Brazil ===
Their first hit single, a reworking of the 1930s song "Brazil", reached the Top 20 in the United States in 1975. It would also later be nominated for the Best Pop Instrumental Performance at the 1976 Grammy awards but was beaten by "The Hustle" by Van McCoy. The album, also titled Brazil, sold well. By November 1, 1975, it had been on the Billboard Album Chart for five weeks and had moved up from #72 to #62. Between then and December 6 the album did reach #52. By then it had moved down from the previous week's position of #60 to #102. The album did give them another dance hit with "The Peanut Vendor". This first album featured vocals by session singers, Barbara Ingram, Carla Benson and Evette Benton. There was no actual group called The Ritchie Family at this stage.

=== Arabian Nights ===
Cassandra Wooten and Nadine Felder from Honey & the Bees had done some background vocal work for Jacques Morali a couple of years prior and he contacted them as he wanted them to perform live as the Ritchie Family. Not wanting to do secular music anymore, Felder wasn't interested. Wooten and Cheryl Mason-Jacks had been doing some work together in a community theater group. With Wooten's former Honey & the Bees bandmate Gwendolyn Oliver, they were looking to do background vocal music and started practicing for a few weeks until Wooten got a call back from Morali. So then in 1975, they went down to Sigma Sound Studios to audition. Singing a few bars of "Brazil", they got the job and became the face of The Ritchie Family. In 1976, they began recording the next album, Arabian Nights.

The single from the album was "The Best Disco in Town". The song was a medley of recent disco songs linked together with an original chorus. The single reached #17 on the Pop charts and #1 on the Dance charts and it became a worldwide hit. Described in the book Saturday Night Forever: The Story of Disco by Alan Jones and Jussi Kantonen as magnificent from start to finish, Arabian Knights has a travelogue type of theme to it. It begins at Istanbul and then goes to the "Lawrence of Arabia" theme and then to the finish at a Persian Market. It had a Hollywood feel with lively percussion, disco glamour and uncharacteristic male voices helping with the vocal chanting.

=== Life Is Music ===
Phil Hurtt who had co-produced Honey & the Bees material with Bunny Sigler had a good understanding of what qualities the vocalists could bring to the group. With their individual style he knew what they would be like together with Gwendolyn's sweet tone, Cassandra's soul and earthiness and Cheryl's more powerful vocals and embodiment of those two other qualities. So he was granted more time to work with them on their vocal arrangements. The respective talents of each vocalist were highlighted as well. The album sessions were kept within the allotted times and six songs were included. The result was a disco-pop album with some elements of Philly soul. This was also the last album that Richie Rome was involved with and he quit around this time. His replacement was Horace Ott for further album releases. Released in 1977 Life Is Music came out on Marlin 2203. By February 12 it was at #184 on the Record World Top 200. By March 15 it was at #13 on the album chart in Italy. By May 10 it was at #10. The single "Life Is Music" peaked at #102 on the Pop charts, #8 on the Dance charts and #74 on the R&B charts.

=== African Queens ===
The album was another themed release with a historical nod to three African queens. With the rhythm backing by the group Gypsy Lane the album had a bit more of the driving Euro type snare drum beat to it than the lush Ritchie sound of the previous releases. In July 1977, it was announced in Billboard that TK Productions was embarking on a massive campaign for the group's African Queens album. The campaign involved mounting an African Queens billboard in Manhattan's Greenwich Village, African Queens kites being flown around the country with kite flying contests being linked to radio stations. There were also African Queens canvas tote bags, tee shirts. Included were full-color photos of Cassandra Wooten, Gwendolyn Oliver and Cheryl Mason Jacks dressed as African queens, Nefertiti, Cleopatra and Queen of Sheba. The album also included the song once done by Martin Denny, "Quiet Village".

== Dismissal of original members and their replacement ==
By 1978, the three members, Wooten, Oliver, and Mason-Jacks, were dismissed without warning. It came as a shock to them as one day they were there and the next day they were not. Even their songwriter Phil Hurtt was just as surprised. He went to the studio to attend the recording sessions and there were three new members in front of him. They had been replaced by Jacqui Smith-Lee, Theodosia "Dodie" Draher and Ednah Holt. It was believed that Morali had planned not to renew their contract and he had already been looking for some replacements. Gwendolyn Oliver stepped away from performing and Cassandra Wooten and Cheryl Mason-Jacks later teamed up with Michelle Simpson and formed Cas Mijac.

== Career: Subsequent line ups ==
The 1978 album, American Generation, featuring the new line-up was a slight departure from disco and more in the style of Europop, although one of the singles from it was called "I Feel Disco Good." The group abandoned the exotic and highly kitsch costumes of their earlier incarnation in favour of a more contemporary, sexually provocative style. For the next album, Bad Reputation, they brought in Victor Willis (original lead singer of Village People) joining Jacques Morali in writing the material. Holt soon departed (and formed her own group Ednah Holt and Starluv) and was replaced by lead singer Vera Brown; the group enjoyed success with "Put Your Feet to the Beat."

The Ritchie Family line-up of Brown, Smith-Lee and Draher next recorded the Give Me A Break album, which contained the hits "Give Me A Break" and "Never Be Able to Set You Free." Continuing with album releases, the next was a markedly different partnership with Jacques Fred Petrus and Mauro Malavasi, the pair behind Change. The album they recorded was I'll Do My Best (For You Baby); following that was All Night All Right (1983). By this time, Dodie Draher had left the group and newcomer Linda James took over her spot.

In 1980, they joined Village People for the movie Can't Stop the Music. The film was a resounding failure and still appears on many critics' "worst ever" lists; however, the soundtrack album sold well in some parts of the world. Disco music had peaked in major territories such as the USA.

After deciding to split, when group owner Jacques Morali discovered he had AIDS, the group continued as Vera Brown and the Rich Girls for one song called "Too Much Too Fast" that failed completely. Vera Brown has reformed The Ritchie Family, with Dodie Draher and Jacqui Smith-Lee, but without further releases. With original members Wooten, Mason-Jacks and Oliver, the group achieved its highest grossing sales.

== Work outside The Ritchie Family ==
=== Cas Mijac ===
Cas Mijac is the name given to a background vocal group which was made up of Michelle Simpson, Cassandra Wooten and Cheryl Mason Jacks. Wooten and Mason Jacks tried to re-group after leaving The Ritchie Family. In 1980, Wooten and Mason Jacks joined Michelle Simpson and sang background vocals on John Lennon's Double Fantasy album. Working with Tony Davilio, they first worked on "Starting Over". As Davilio tells it, they were set up in the studio about three feet away from him around a suspended microphone. Because Wooten, Mason-Jacks, and Simpson didn't read music, Davilio was at the piano giving them their notes. He had to do it a few times and giving each of them their notes a few bars at a time. This method was used in the recording process as well. This can take time. Whenever one of Cas Mijac had to do a retake, the engineer would have to stop the tape and re-cue it back to the point of recording. After the couple of minutes it took to do this, they would sometimes forget their notes which frustrated Davilio who having been a smoker was suffering the effects of nicotine withdrawal. He would forget their names, confusing Cassandra with Cheryl. With the session continuing and both parties forgetting things he was getting frustrated and they were getting annoyed and things were getting unpleasant. While working on the song "Woman" he continued with the misnaming. Meanwhile Lennon had come into the studio and was standing behind him and, in Davilio's words, slapped Davilio "upside the head". The women were discussing going on the road with Lennon, but his being killed ended that opportunity. After that they put priority on new careers and their families.

=== Other ===
Cheryl Mason Dorman sang a song "Whatever He Says, Just Do It!" which appears on the Christian-themed Pacita's Friends album which also featured Lenora Davis, Carrie Lloyd and Roz Christian. The album was released in 2007. Gwendolyn Oliver (married to musician Fred Wesley) opted for the quiet life, was a committed Christian who was very involved in her church and held Bible study sessions. She died on November 27, 2020, at age 71.

== Reformation ==
In the beginning of reforming, Cheryl Mason-Dorman and Cassandra Wooten worked for a period of time with Michelle Simpson who they worked with in Cas Mijac. Then they stopped for a period and then later settled with Renee Guilory-Wearing. Now with original members Cassandra Wooten, Cheryl Mason-Dorman and new member Renee Guilory-Wearing as the reformed group they started touring.

The Ritchie Family is featured in Jim Arena's book First Ladies of Disco, released in June 2013. In July 2016, The Ritchie Family released a single "Ice" on Martha Wash's Purple Rose recording label. The song was later remixed and released as a maxi-single of six tracks.

In 2021, they released the single, "Whatcha Got".

The group appeared on the Italian Show ‘I Migilor Anni - Dell 'Estate' on May 27, 2023.

== Members timeline ==
1975–78	1978–79	1979–82	1982–84	2011–present
Gwendolyn Oliver	Jacqui Smith-Lee	Jacqui Smith-Lee	Jacqui Smith-Lee	Renée Guillory-Wearing
Cassandra Ann Wooten	Theodosia 'Dodie' Draher	Theodosia 'Dodie' Draher	Linda James	Cassandra Ann Wooten
Cheryl Mason Jacks	Ednah Holt	Vera Brown	Vera Brown	Cheryl Mason Dorman (formerly Cheryl Mason Jacks)

== Discography ==
=== Studio albums ===
Year	Title	Peak chart positions							Certifications	Record label
Year	Title	US	US R&B	AUS	CAN	NLD	NOR	SWE	Certifications	Record label
1975	Brazil	53	26	—	36	—	—	—		20th Century
1976	Arabian Nights	30	23	3	7	13	17	44	ARIA: Platinum; MC: Gold	Marlin
1977	Life Is Music	100	—	23	49	—	—	35		Marlin
1977	African Queens	164	57	66	—	—	—	—		Marlin
1978	American Generation	148	—	78	—	—	—	—		Marlin
1979	Bad Reputation	—	—	76	—	—	—	—		Casablanca
1980	Give Me a Break	—	—	—	—	—	—	—		Casablanca
1982	I'll Do My Best	203	36	—	—	—	—	—		RCA Victor
1983	All Night All Right	—	—	—	—	—	—	—		RCA Victor
"—" denotes a recording that did not chart or was not released in that territory.

=== Compilation albums ===
- Greatest Hits (1990, Unidisc)
- The Best Disco in Town: The Best of the Ritchie Family (1994, Hot Productions)

=== Singles ===
Year	Title	Peak chart positions										Certifications	Album
Year	Title	US	US R&B	US Dan	AUS	CAN	GER	NLD	NOR	SWE	UK	Certifications	Album
1975	"Brazil"	11	13	1	65	9	47	25	—	—	41		Brazil
1975	"Peanut Vendor" / "Frenesi" (medley)	—	—	4	—	—	—	—	—	—	—		Brazil
1975	"I Want to Dance with You (Dance with Me)"	84	74	18	—	80	—	—	—	—	—		Brazil
1976	"The Best Disco in Town" ^{[A]}	17	12	1	3	15	22	2	10	13	10	MC: Gold	Arabian Nights
1977	"Life Is Music"	102	74	8	55	50	50	—	—	—	—		Life Is Music
1977	"Lady Luck"	—	—	8	—	—	—	—	—	—	—		Life Is Music
1977	"Disco Blues"	—	—	8	—	—	—	—	—	—	—		Life Is Music
1977	"Quiet Village"	—	68	1	—	—	—	—	—	—	—		African Queens
1977	"African Queens"	—	—	1	—	—	—	—	—	—	—		African Queens
1977	"Summer Dance"	—	—	1	—	—	—	—	—	—	—		African Queens
1978	"American Generation"	—	—	19	—	—	28	8	—	—	49		American Generation
1978	"I Feel Disco Good"	—	—	19	—	26	—	—	—	—	—		American Generation
1978	"Music Man"	—	—	19	—	—	—	—	—	—	—		American Generation
1979	"It's a Man's World"	—	—	—	—	—	—	—	—	—	—		Bad Reputation
1979	"Put Your Feet to the Beat"	—	—	14	—	—	—	—	—	—	—		Bad Reputation
1979	"Where Are the Men"	—	—	—	—	—	—	—	—	—	—		Bad Reputation
1980	"Give Me a Break"	—	80	25	91	—	—	15	—	17	—		Give Me a Break
1980	"All My Love"	—	—	—	—	—	—	—	—	—	—		Give Me a Break
1980	"I'll Never Be Able to Set You Free"	—	—	—	—	—	—	—	—	—	—		Give Me a Break
1982	"I'll Do My Best (For You Baby)"	—	27	17	—	—	—	—	—	—	—		I'll Do My Best
1983	"All Night All Right"	—	77	—	—	—	—	—	—	—	—		All Night All Right
1987	"The Best Disco in Town (Original Remix 87)"	—	—	—	—	—	—	93	—	—	—		—N/a
2016	"Ice"	—	—	40	—	—	—	—	—	—	—		—N/a
2021	"Whatcha Got"	—	—	—	—	—	—	—	—	—	—		
"—" denotes a recording that did not chart or was not released in that territory.

- ^{A} "The Best Disco in Town" also charted at No. 4 on the Disco Action chart as part of all tracks from the album Arabian Nights.

=== Soundtracks ===
- 1979: Je Te Tiens, Tu Me Tiens Par La Barbichette
- 1980: Can't Stop the Music
