= Marlin Records =

Historical record label

- Parent company: TK Records
- Founded: Henry Stone
- Country of origin: United States

Marlin Records was one of the record labels set-up by Henry Stone before he launched the successful TK Records.

== See also ==
- List of record labels
