= Henri Belolo =

French music producer (1936–2019)

Background information
- Born: 27 November 1936; Casablanca, French Morocco
- Died: 3 August 2019 (aged 82) Paris, France
- Occupations: Music producer, songwriter, A&R man

Henri Belolo (French pronunciation: [ɑ̃ʁi bəlɔlo]; 27 November 1936 – 3 August 2019) was a French music producer and songwriter active during the disco era.

Born in Morocco, he started his career as a club DJ and A&R man. In the 1970s, with his friend, composer Jacques Morali, he worked in the United States, creating The Ritchie Family as well as their most successful group, Village People.

== Life and career ==
Belolo was born to a Moroccan Jewish family in Casablanca, Morocco, and grew up there listening to music introduced by US troops as well as that of African musicians. He studied business in Casablanca, before traveling in 1956 to Paris, France, where he met record company owner and producer Eddie Barclay. Belolo worked with Barclay, importing and promoting records, and started working as a club DJ, work which he continued after returning to Casablanca.

In 1960, he was recruited by Polydor Records in Paris to work in A&R and as a producer, where he worked on albums by Georges Moustaki, Serge Renée, and Jeanne Moreau. He also organized concerts in Paris by James Brown, the Bee Gees and others. He then set up his own record label, Carabine, and music publishing company, Scorpio Music, and in the early 1970s began licensing disco records.

In 1973, he moved to the US and set up Can't Stop Productions in New York City, with an associated talent scout office in Philadelphia. He met Jacques Morali in early 1975, and the pair produced the single "Brazil" by the Ritchie Family, recorded in Philadelphia and arranged by Richie Rome who gave the group its name. The song became a US club hit, and then a worldwide success, in 1975, helped by promotion from DJ Frankie Crocker. Belolo and Morali continued to work together, with Belolo predominantly writing lyrics and Morali the music.

Unlike his associate Morali, Belolo was not gay; however, he visited clubs with Morali and saw the potential of appealing to the gay nightclub scene. In 1977, they created the group Village People, seeing their image of gay stereotypes as a way to embody a certain partying spirit. Belolo and Morali began working with the band and presented their demos to Neil Bogart of Casablanca Records, who agreed to release the band's records. Belolo continued to contribute to the Village People records, including "Y.M.C.A.", "In the Navy", and "Go West", with Morali and, in some cases, the band's lead singer Victor Willis. In 2015, Willis won a legal case against Can't Stop Productions, successfully claiming that he and Morali had written the songs together, without any involvement from Belolo. The production company claimed that Belolo had written French lyrics that were then adapted by Willis, but this claim was rejected by the court which ruled that Belolo's name as co-writer should be removed.

In the 1980s, Belolo and Morali introduced and produced records by Break Machine. Belolo continued to work in France as a music producer, until his death on 3 August 2019 in Paris, France.

== Awards ==
- Chevalier of the Order of Arts and Letters (2015)
