= Jacques Morali =

French musician (1947–1991)

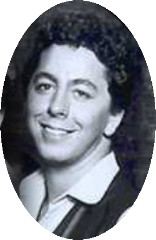
- Jacques Morali in May 1978

Background information
- Born: 4 July 1947; 3rd arrondissement of Paris, France
- Died: 15 November 1991 (aged 44) Neuilly-sur-Seine, France
- Genres: Disco; dance; funk; R&B
- Occupations: Composer; songwriter; record producer
- Years active: 1967–1985
- Label: Casablanca

Jacques Morali (4 July 1947 – 15 November 1991) was a French disco and dance music record producer and songwriter, known for collaborating with Henri Belolo to create acts such as the Ritchie Family and Village People.

== Early life ==
Morali was born in 1947 (some sources say 1946) in Casablanca, French Morocco to a Moroccan Jewish family.

== Career ==
=== Beginning in France ===
Morali made his start in the music business at the end of the 1960s, writing music for orchestras in Paris, for the Crazy Horse, for himself as a solo artist (he played in 1967 show "Elle aime, elle n'aime pas" and released a single of the same title) but also for performers like Peter Fersen. Viva Zapata (Venus VS-71451), one of his first French productions, was sung by "Clint Farwood" – a pseudonym for a member of King Harvest. In the early 1970s, Morali met French music producer Henri Belolo. But he thought quickly that his success in France was not as great as expected and decided to try his luck in North America. Through meeting José Eber, Elizabeth Taylor and Cher's hairdresser, he became familiar with Philadelphia International Records. At the time, Morali proposed several projects to Belolo without convincing him.

=== International ===
In 1975, Morali told Belolo about his intention to adapt the song "Brazil" from The Gang's All Here starring Carmen Miranda. The idea was to make an epic record for the clubs, sung by larger-than-life female singers. Seduced by the idea, Belolo agreed to finance a long-lasting Morali residency at Sigma Sound Studios in Philadelphia. That was the start of their collaboration. They cast three girls (Cheryl Jacks, Cassandra Wooten and Gwendolyn Oliver) and named the band The Ritchie Family. "Brazil" was a solid success, the first of many that made them long-term partners ("The Best Disco In Town" (1976), "Life Is Music" (1977), "African Queens" (1977), "Quiet Village" (1977) & "American Generation" (1978)), both as creator and author, on top of also being writer and editor (Black Scorpio Publishing).

=== Mainstream ===
While in New York, Morali attended a costume ball at "Les Mouches", a gay disco in Greenwich Village. Seeing the types of costumes and some common ensembles worn by the party guests, the idea came to him to put together a group of singers and dancers, each one playing a different gay fantasy figure. At first, Belolo was not involved in this project, but when he saw that Morali had succeeded in signing a licensing deal with Casablanca Records (one of the more famous disco labels), Belolo decided to become his collaborator on the project. The Village People's songs include "San Francisco (You've Got Me)" (1977), "YMCA" (1978), "Macho Man" (1978), "In the Navy" (1979), "Go West" (1980) and "Sex Over the Phone" (1985) and they became one of the more successful acts of the disco era with their flamboyant concept albums.

Morali's music was characterized by simple arrangements, a unique sense of camp, simplistic lyrics and simple catchy melodies that could be remembered easily. Between 1974 and 1982, he recorded over 65 albums. He co-wrote songs for many artists including Patrick Juvet, Régine, Dalida, Eric Russell, Cher, Patricia Norton, Julius Brown, Starlight, Diva, Dennis Parker, David London, Wayne Scott, Lova Moor and Pia Zadora. After the post-1970s disco backlash, he began collaborating with Fred Zarr, precipitating work with Break Machine and 1984's Eartha Kitt album I Love Men.

In the late 1970s, he had a sexual relationship with singer, actor and adult film star Wade Nichols.

== Death ==
Morali contracted HIV in the mid-1980s. On 15 November 1991, he died of AIDS-related causes at a hospital in Paris at the age of 44. Morali is buried in Saint-Paul-de-Vence.
