= Sqeezer discography =

- Sqeezer in 1996
- Studio albums: 2
- Singles: 12
- Music videos: 14
- Promotional singles: 3

The discography of the Sqeezer, a German Dance and pop group, consists of two studio albums, twelve singles, including two as a featured artist, three promotional singles, and 14 music videos, including two as featured artist. The first release was the group's debut album Drop Your Pants in 1996, followed by the sophomore release Streetlife in 1998. After a string of single releases, such as "High Heels" along with other songs "Anybody" and "No Goodbye", a third album, titled Reloaded, was planned for release around 2008. However the release was shelved. In 2013 and 2014, "Sex With A Rockstar" and "Crazy Love" were in process, before the disbandment due to Reeves death in 2016.

== Albums ==
=== Studio albums ===
Year	Album details	Peak chart positions	Certifications
GER
1996	Drop Your Pants: Released: 1996; Label: EMI (Germany), (Sweden), (Poland), (Ukraine), (Russia); Formats: CD, Cassette	—	POL: Gold
1998	Streetlife: Released: 1998; Label: EMI, Electrola (Germany), (Poland), (Russia); Formats: CD, Cassette	77	
"—" denotes a title that did not chart.

=== Unreleased albums ===
Year	Album details	Notes
2008	Reloaded: Release date: Unreleased; Label: DA; Format: CD	Shelved and cancelled possibly due to low sales of the recent singles "High Heels" or "Hot Bikini". Another songs to include were "Anybody" and "No Goodbye".

=== Singles ===
Year	Single	Peak chart positions					Certifications (sales thresholds)	Album
AUT	EUR	GER	SPA	SUI				
1995	"Scandy Randy"	—	—	39	—	—		Drop Your Pants
1996	"Blue Jeans"	15	81	16	11	—	POL: Gold; CZE: Gold	Drop Your Pants
1996	"Sweet Kisses"	—	24	24	1	—	POL: 2× Gold; CZE: 2× Gold; SPA: 2× Gold	Drop Your Pants
1997	"Saturday Night"	—	—	43	5	—	SPA: Gold	Drop Your Pants
1997	"Tamagotchi (Tschoopapa...)"	—	—	55	—	—		Tamagotchi Smash Hits
1997	"Get It Right" (with Bed & Breakfast and Mola Adebisi)	—	—	46	—	—		Streetlife
1998	"Without You"	10	47	10	—	12		Streetlife
1998	"Wake Up"	—	—	59	—	—		Streetlife
1999	"Wishing You Were Here"	—	—	—	—	—		N.A.
2001	"Remember Summertime"	—	—	—	—	—		Streetlife
"—" denotes releases that did not chart.

=== Featured singles ===
Title	Year	Peak chart positions	Album
Title	Year	GER	Album
"Let The Music Heal Your Soul" (As part of Bravo All Stars)	1998	—	Surfin' USA
"Hey Helicopter" (DJ Beatboy feat. Squeezer)	2008	—	N.A.
"—" denotes releases that did not chart.

=== Promotional singles ===
Title	Year	Peak chart positions	Album
Title	Year	GER	Album
"3 Times"	2002	—	N.A.
"Hot Bikini"/"Hot Ski Teeny"	2004	—	N.A.
"High Heels"	2008	—	N.A.
"—" denotes releases that did not chart.

=== Other appearances ===
Title	Year	Album
"Anybody"	2007	Fantasy Dance Hits Vol. 9
"No Goodbye"	2008	MySpace only

== Music videos ==
Year	Title	Director(s)
1995	"Scandy Randy"	Eric Will
1996	"Blue Jeans"	Oliver Sommer
1996	"Sweet Kisses"	Oliver Sommer
1997	"Saturday Night"	Camelot
1997	"Tamagotchi (Tschoopapa...)"	Chris Williams
1997	"Get It Right" (with Bed & Breakfast and Mola Adebisi)	Patrick Kiely
1998	"Without You"	Patrick Kiely
1998	"Wake Up"	Patrick Kiely
1999	"Wishing You Were Here"	Patrick Kiely
2001	"Remember Summertime"	Patrick Kiely
2004	"Hot Bikini"/"Hot Ski Teeny"	Unknown
2008	"High Heels"	Unknown

=== Featured music videos ===
Year	Title	Director(s)
1998	"Let The Music Heal Your Soul" (As part of Bravo All Stars)	Unknown
2008	"Hey Helicopter" (DJ Beatboy feat. Squeezer)	Unknown
