= Let the Music Heal Your Soul =

Single by Bravo All Stars
- Released: 18 May 1998
- Recorded: 1998
- Genre: Pop
- Length: 3:20
- Label: Edel Music America
- Songwriter(s): Alex Christensen
- Producer(s): Frank Peterson

"Let the Music Heal Your Soul" is a charity record released by the supergroup Bravo All Stars on 18 May 1998. The band consisted of Touché, The Boyz, The Moffatts, Scooter, Aaron Carter, the Backstreet Boys, Mr. President, NSYNC, Sqeezer, Blümchen, R'n'G and Gil Ofarim. The idea behind it was conceived by Alex Christensen, to benefit charity to the Nordoff–Robbins Music Therapy Foundation. Each artist took turns singing two lines from each verse, while all of the singers sang the chorus together. "Let the Music Heal Your Soul" reached number 36 on the UK Singles Chart in September 1998. The song also reached number 60 on the Billboard Hot 100 in 1998.

== Track listing ==
1. "Let the Music Heal Your Soul" (radio)
2. "Let the Music Heal Your Soul" (album version)
3. "Let the Music Heal Your Soul" (unplugged)
4. "Let the Music Heal Your Soul" (instrumental)

== Charts ==
Chart (1998)	Peak position
Austria (Ö3 Austria Top 40)	22
Germany (GfK)	6
Netherlands (Single Top 100)	24
Norway (VG-lista)	4
Scotland (OCC)	35
Switzerland (Schweizer Hitparade)	5
UK Singles (OCC)	36
US Billboard Hot 100	60
