= Bravo All Stars =

German and American pop supergroup (1998)

- Also known as: BAS
- Origin: Hamburg, Germany and United States
- Genres: Pop
- Years active: 1998
- Labels: Edel Music America
- Past members: Aaron Carter; Nick Carter; Justin Timberlake; Brian Littrell; Howie Dorough; AJ McLean; Kevin Richardson; Gil Ofarim; Blumchen; Scott Moffatt; Axel Broszeit; Rick J. Jordan; Dave Moffatt; Judith Hildebrandt; Bob Moffatt; Clint Moffatt; Glenn Frey; Benjamin Boyce; Florian Fischer; Adel Tawil; Lee Baxter; Bastiaan Ragas; Loretta Stern; Karim Maataoui; Lady Danii; Delroy Rennalls; Tareec; Stephanie Claudio; Kroll-Marongiu; MC Fix it; Gerel Koningsverdraag; Jim Reeves; Eloy De Jong; Salvatore Di Blasi; Alexander Geist; Dennis Frey; Martin Scholz

Bravo All Stars were a pop supergroup initiated by the teen magazine Bravo in Hamburg, Germany and the United States in 1998.

== History ==
"Let the Music Heal Your Soul" was released as a single by the Bravo All Stars on 18 May 1998. The band consisted of: Touché, The Boyz, The Moffatts, Scooter, Aaron Carter, the Backstreet Boys, Mr. President, Justin Timberlake, Sqeezer, Blümchen, R'n'G and Gil. The idea behind it was conceived by Alex Christensen, to benefit charity to the Nordoff-Robbins Music Therapy Foundation. Each artist took turns singing two lines from each verse, while all of the singers sang the chorus together. "Let the Music Heal Your Soul" reached number 36 in the UK Singles Chart in August 1998. The song ranked number 73 on the 1998 year-end singles chart in Germany.
