= Here I Am (Gil album) =

Studio album by Gil Ofarim
- Released: 25 May 1998
- Recorded: 1997–1998
- Genre: Pop rock
- Label: RCA Local
- Producer: Andy Jonas, Axel Kroell, Leslie Mandoki

Gil Ofarim chronology
Here I Am (1998)	The Album (2000)

Singles from Here I Am
- 1. "Round 'n' Round (It Goes)" Released: 1997; 2. "If You Only Knew (featuring the Moffatts)" Released: 1998

Here I Am is the debut studio album by German singer-songwriter Gil Ofarim, released on May 25, 1998. Two singles were released from the album, "Round 'n' Round (It Goes)" and "If You Only Knew", featuring Canadian band the Moffatts.

== Track listing ==
No.	Title	Writer(s)	Length
1.	"Intro-Welcome"	Laszlo Bencker; Leslie Mandoki	0:42
2.	"See It in Your Eyes"	Bencker; Mandoki	3:52
3.	"If You Only Knew" (featuring The Moffatts)	Bob Moffatt; Clint Moffatt; Dave Moffatt; Gil Ofarim; Scott Moffatt; Tal Ofarim	4:06
4.	"Bang, Bang, Bang"	Andy Jonas; Julian Feifel	3:17
5.	"Round 'n' Round (It Goes)"	Jonas; Feifel	3:35
6.	"I Am So in Love"	Gil Ofarim; Jonas	3:56
7.	"Am I Crazy?"	Bencker; Mandoki	3:53
8.	"Come On, Come On"	Bencker; Mandoki	3:06
9.	"For Heaven's Sake"	Jonas; Ofarim; Feifel	3:43
10.	"Charline"	Jürgen Dollase	3:30
11.	"I Need You"	Ofarim; Kilian Reischl; Bencker; Mandoki	5:45
12.	"Bandstarter"	David Birde	3:12
13.	"Never Giving Up Now"	Andrew Hill; Tracy Ackerman	3:17
14.	"Goodbye"	Jonas; Feifel	3:36

== Charts ==
Chart (1998)	Peak position
Austrian Albums (Ö3 Austria)	47
German Albums (Offizielle Top 100)	20
Swiss Albums (Schweizer Hitparade)	34
