= Until You Loved Me =

Single by The Moffatts

from the album Chapter I: A New Beginning
- Released: April 26, 1999
- Genre: Pop rock
- Length: 4:50
- Label: EMI
- Songwriters: Dave Munday; Phil Thornalley

The Moffatts singles chronology
"Girl of My Dreams" (1999)	"Until You Loved Me" (1999)	"Misery" (1999)

"Until You Loved Me" is a song by Canadian pop rock band The Moffatts. It was released in April 1999 as the fourth single from their third album, Chapter I: A New Beginning. The song was a hit in Canada, reaching No. 23 on Canada's singles chart and peaked at No. 57 on the Canadian RPM Adult Contemporary chart. The song was the carrier single of the soundtrack of the motion picture Never Been Kissed and was the band's US debut. Scott Moffatt was the lead vocalist.

== Critical reception ==
David Veitch of the Calgary Sun described Until You Loved Me as having a distinct Barenaked Ladies vibe.

== Music video ==
The music video premiered in mid-1999 and featured actress Danielle Fishel and clips from the film Never Been Kissed.

== Track listing ==
CD 1

1. "Until You Loved Me" – 3:39
2. "Snippets" (Misery, Written All Over My Heart, Miss You Like Crazy) - 4:07
3. "Let's Party" - 3:17

CD 2

1. "Until You Loved Me" – 3:39
2. "She Said" - 3:47
3. "All I Need Is You" - 4:37

== Chart positions ==
Chart (1999)	Peak position
Canadian Top Singles (RPM)	23
Canadian Adult Contemporary (RPM)	57
UK Singles (OCC)	36
