= Girl of My Dreams =

Girl of My Dreams may refer to:

- "Girl of My Dreams" (Juice Wrld and Suga song), 2021
- "Girl of My Dreams" (The Moffatts song), 1999
- "Girl of My Dreams" (Rod Wave song), 2020
- Girl of My Dreams (album), 2022 studio album by Fletcher
- "Girl of My Dreams", song by Chris Brown from Indigo
- "Girl of My Dreams", a song by Bram Tchaikovsky
- "Girl of My Dreams (I Love You)", written by Sunny Clapp (1927); see List of songs recorded by Perry Como

== See also ==
- Girl o' My Dreams, a 1934 film
