= Chapter I: A New Beginning =

Studio album by the Moffatts
- Released: May 18, 1998
- Genres: Pop rock, teen pop, bubblegum pop
- Length: 43:57
- Label: Capitol / EMI
- Producers: Glen Ballard; additional production by Jeff Coplan. Track 8 produced by The Moffats

The Moffatts chronology
The Moffatts (1995)	Chapter I: A New Beginning (1998)	Submodalities (2000)

US Edition Cover

Alternative cover

Singles from Chapter I: A New Beginning
- 1. "I'll Be There for You" Released: April 8, 1998; 2. "Miss You Like Crazy" Released: 1998; 3. "If Life Is So Short" Released: 1998; 4. "Girl of My Dreams" Released: January 18, 1999; 5. "Crazy" Released: February 8, 1999; 6. "Until You Loved Me" Released: April 26, 1999; 7. "Misery" Released: 1999

Professional ratings
Review scores
Source	Rating
AllMusic	4/5 stars

Chapter I: A New Beginning is the third album by Canadian pop rock group the Moffatts, and the first to be released on a major label. The album was released in Canada in 1998, with the American version released the next year. The album was very successful in Southeast Asia, and the band gained moderate success worldwide. The album was also certified platinum by the CRIA with sales of over 100,000 copies across Canada.

== Track listing ==
=== Canadian version ===
1. "Wild At Heart" – 3:25
2. "Miss You Like Crazy" – 3:49
3. "Say'n I ♥ U" – 2:27
4. "Girl of My Dreams" – 3:39
5. "Crazy" – 3:36
6. "Don't Walk Away" – 3:03
7. "Now And Forever" – 3:18
8. "Love" – 3:09
9. "I'll Be There for You" – 4:16
10. "Girl I'm Gonna Get You" – 3:47
11. "We Are Young" – 3:41
12. "If Life Is So Short" – 4:02
13. "Jump" – 4:10
14. (Hidden track) "Frustration" - 3:21

=== US version ===
1. "Until You Loved Me" – 3:27
2. "Misery" – 4:50
3. "Miss You Like Crazy" – 3:25
4. "Written All Over My Heart" - 3:48
5. "Girl of My Dreams" – 3:39
6. "Crazy" – 3:39
7. "Say'n I ♥ U" – 2:29
8. "Love" – 3:10
9. "I'll Be There For You" – 4:16
10. "Wild at Heart" – 3:25
11. "Raining in My Mind – 4:21
12. "If Life Is So Short" – 4:02

=== UK version ===
1. "Crazy" – 3:36
2. "Girl of My Dreams" – 3:39
3. "Miss You Like Crazy" – 3:49
4. "Wild at Heart" – 3:25
5. "If Life Is So Short" – 4:02
6. "I'll Be There For You" – 4:16
7. "Don't Walk Away" – 3:03
8. "Jump" – 4:10
9. "Love" – 3:09
10. "Now And Forever" – 3:18
11. "Say'n I ♥ U" – 2:27
12. "We Are Young" – 3:41
13. "Girl I'm Gonna Get You" – 3:47

=== Tour Souvenir Package ===
1. "Miss You Like Crazy" (Tom Lord-Alge Remix) – 3:25
2. "Crazy" (Tom Lord-Alge Remix) – 3:39
3. "I'll Be There For You" (Tom Lord-Alge Remix) – 4:16
4. "Girl of My Dreams" (Tom Lord-Alge Remix) – 3:39
5. "If Life Is So Short" (Tom Lord-Alge Remix) – 4:02
6. "Ya Ya - 3:02
7. "Girls of the World" - 2:54
8. "Lara" (My Love) - 4:14
9. "If Life Is So Short" (Live) - 8:27
10. "Say'n I ♥ U" (Live Version) - 2:34

=== Chapter I: A New Beginning LIVE - Live in Spain ===
1. "Crazy"
2. "Girl of My Dreams"
3. "Say'n I ♥ U"
4. "She Loves You"
5. "Won't Back Down"
6. "I'll Be There For You"
7. "Don't Judge This Book"
8. "I"
9. "Love"
10. "I'll Never Know"
11. "Misery"
12. "If Life Is So Short"
13. "Wild at Heart"
14. "Miss You Like Crazy"
15. "Shine"

== Other tracks ==
- "I" (Demo) - 3:31
- "Over The Rainbow" - 3:00
- "I'll Never Know" (Demo) - 3:55
- "Let's Party" - 3:17
- "She Said" - 3:47
- "All I Need Is You" 4:37
- "Destiny" 4:12

== Chart positions ==
(1998)	Peak position
Austrian Albums (Ö3 Austria Top 40)	29
Canadian Albums (Billboard)	49
German Albums (Media Control)	18
Malaysian Albums (IFPI)	3
Portuguese Albums (AFP)	11
Scottish Albums (OCC)	78
Singapore Albums (SPVA)	7
Swedish Albums (Sverigetopplistan)	55
Swiss Albums (Swiss Hitparade)	28
UK Albums (OCC)	62
US Billboard 200	124

== Certifications and sales ==
Region	Certification	Certified units/sales
Canada (Music Canada)	Platinum	100,000^{^}
Philippines	—	200,000
Spain (Promusicae)	Gold	50,000^{^}
^{^} Shipments figures based on certification alone.
