= Y.M.C.A. (song) =

1978 single by Village People

Single by Village People

from the album Cruisin'
- B-side: "The Women"
- Released: 9 October 1978
- Recorded: 1978
- Studio: Sigma Sound, New York City
- Genre: Disco
- Length: 3:49 (single/video version); 4:47 (album version); 6:47 (12-inch disco version)
- Label: Casablanca
- Songwriters: Jacques Morali; Victor Willis
- Producer: Jacques Morali

Village People singles chronology
"Macho Man" (1978)	"Y.M.C.A." (1978)	"In the Navy" (1979)

Alternative release(s)
- One of A-side label variants of a U.S. 7-inch vinyl single

Music video
- "Y.M.C.A." on YouTube

"Y.M.C.A." is a song by American disco group Village People, written by Jacques Morali (also the record's producer) and singer Victor Willis and released in October 1978 by Casablanca Records as the only single from their third studio album, Cruisin' (1978). A medley with "Hot Cop" reached No. 2 on the US Billboard Dance Music/Club Play Singles chart, while the song reached No. 2 on the Billboard Hot 100 in early 1979, placing behind both "Le Freak" by Chic and "Da Ya Think I'm Sexy?" by Rod Stewart. Outside the U.S., "Y.M.C.A." reached No. 1 on the UK singles chart in 1979, becoming the group's biggest hit and one of the best-selling singles with 12 million copies sold worldwide. In 2024, 46 years after its release, "Y.M.C.A." spent six weeks at No. 1 on the Billboard Dance/Electronic Digital Song Sales chart.

The song remains popular and is played at many parties and sporting events around the world, with crowds joining in on the dance by spelling out the four letters of the song's title via arm movements. "Y.M.C.A." is No. 7 on VH1's list of "The 100 Greatest Dance Songs of the 20th Century". In 2020, "Y.M.C.A." was inducted into the Grammy Hall of Fame and selected by the Library of Congress for preservation in the National Recording Registry for being "culturally, historically, or aesthetically significant". In its official press release, the Library noted that "back in its heyday, 'Y.M.C.A.' was a hit around the world, going to No. 1 on the charts in over 15 countries, and its ongoing popularity is evidence that, despite the naysayers, disco has never truly died."

== History ==
In the United States, the YMCA began building single-room occupancy (SRO) facilities in the 1880s to house men from rural areas who moved into cities to look for work. By the 1970s, the typical YMCA tenants were more likely to be homeless people and youth facing life issues, rather than people migrating from rural areas.

Victor Willis, lead singer and lyricist, recalled that, while in the studio, producer Jacques Morali asked him, "What exactly is the YMCA?" After Willis explained it to him, he saw the expression on Morali's face and said, "Don't tell me, Jacques, you want to write a song about it?", and they quickly wrote the track for the album Cruisin'. Upon the song's release, the YMCA threatened to sue the band over trademark infringement, but ultimately settled with the composers out of court, later expressing pride regarding the song's purpose as a tribute to the organization.

In 2015, Willis won a legal case against Can't Stop Productions, successfully claiming that he and Morali had written this and other Village People songs together, without any involvement from executive producer Henri Belolo, who was credited on the song's original release. The production company claimed that Belolo had written French lyrics that were then adapted by Willis, but this claim was rejected by the court, which ruled that Belolo's name as co-writer should be removed.

== Lyrical content ==
Taken at face value, the song's lyrics extol the virtues of the Young Men's Christian Association (YMCA). However, according to some in the gay culture, the song was implicitly understood as celebrating YMCA's reputation as a popular cruising and hookup spot, particularly for the younger men to whom it was addressed. The initial goal of Village People producers Morali and Belolo was to attract disco's gay audience by featuring popular gay fantasy in their music. Although co-creator Morali was gay and the group was initially intended to target gay men, the group became more popular and more mainstream over time.

Willis maintained that he did not write "Y.M.C.A." as a gay anthem, and that lyrics such as "hang[ing] out with all the boys" was "simply 1970s Black slang for Black guys hanging out together for sports, gambling or whatever". However, Willis often acknowledged his fondness for double entendre.

In 2024, Willis reiterated his denial that "Y.M.C.A." was written as a gay anthem, that people needed to "get their minds out of the gutter", that the "false assumptions were damaging to the song", and further said, "my wife will start suing each and every news organization that falsely refers to Y.M.C.A. [as] a gay anthem". Willis also added that "I don't mind that gays think of YMCA as their anthem."

While describing his love for the song, U.S. President Donald Trump said, "They call it the gay national anthem. 'Y.M.C.A.' gets people up and it gets them moving."

In an article for Gothamist, writer Abbey White states the atmosphere of the YMCA was "more complicated than the lyrics portray, with gay culture and working-class workouts coexisting in a single communal space", creating "a mix of white-collar and blue-collar residents, along with retired seniors and veterans", with about half of the residents being gay. While the song gives the impression that YMCA's single-room occupancy (SRO) units in the 1970s had a party atmosphere, Paul Groth states that YMCA SROs actually had "more supervision of your social life — a kind of management as to how you behaved ... [than] in a commercial rooming house, which mostly wanted to make sure the rooms were rented", without monitoring who you brought to your room.

== Music video ==
The accompanying music video for "Y.M.C.A.", filmed in New York City in July 1978, features the band singing the song and dancing all over the city. The location shown the most is the original site of YMCA, McBurney, 213 West 23rd Street. Other filming locations included 395 West Street – site of the Ramrod gay club – the West Side Piers and Hudson River Park. It ends with the camera zooming in on the Empire State Building.

== Origin of dance and hand movement ==
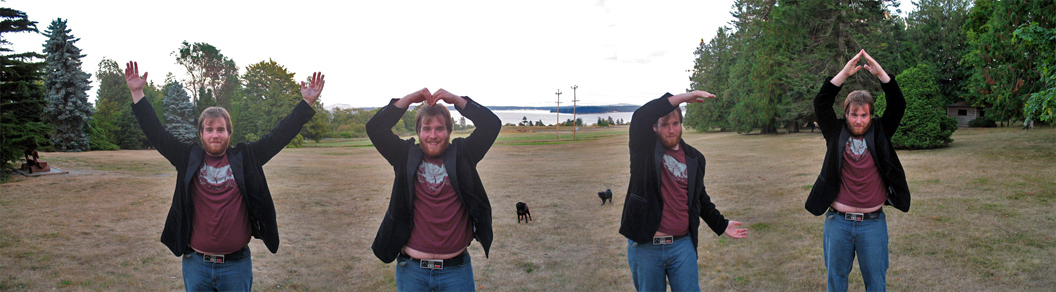
The YMCA dance demonstrated in a photomontage. In this rendition, the M (second from left) is done in a popular variant.

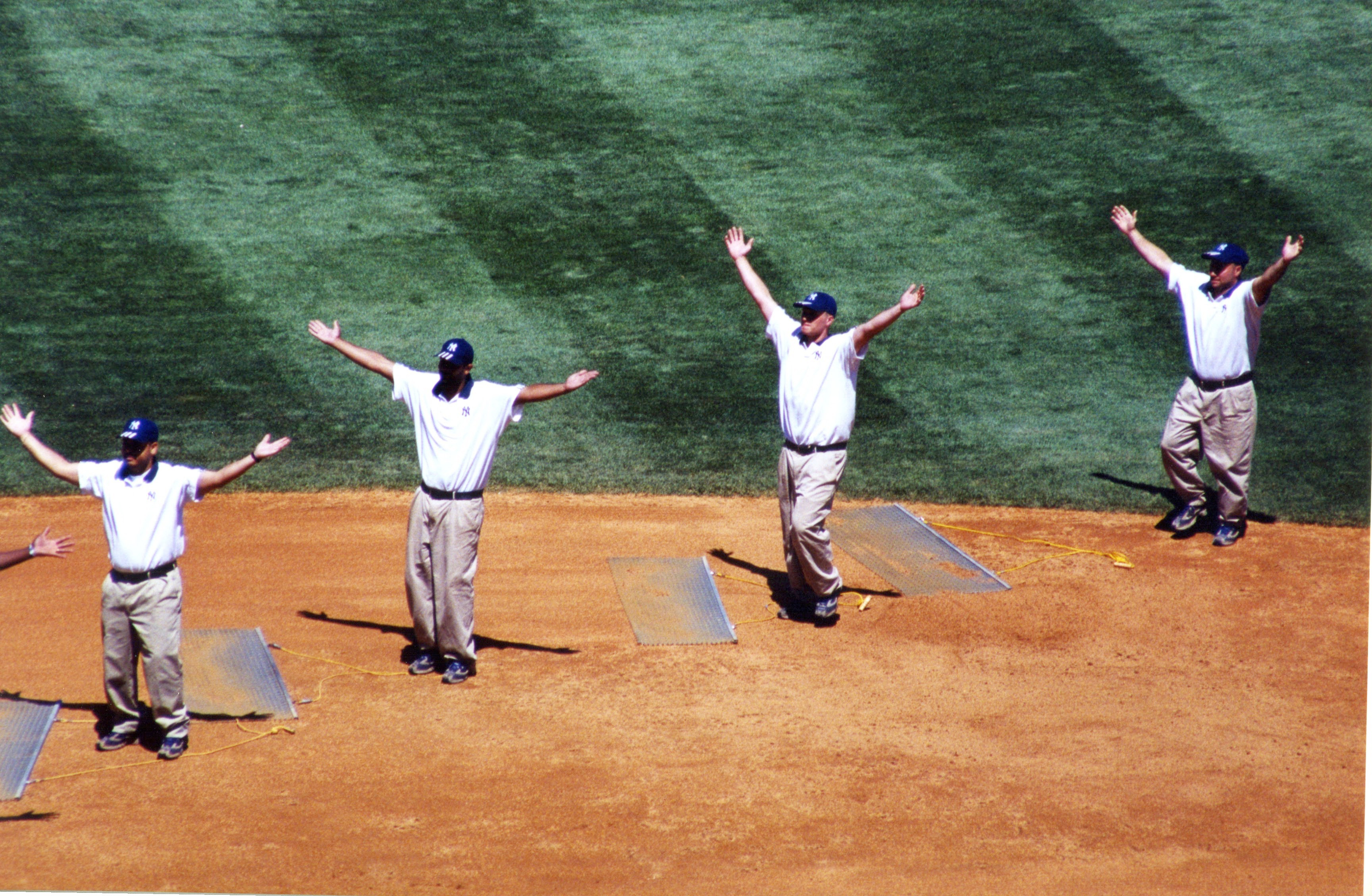
Members of the grounds crew of Yankee Stadium pause to do the YMCA dance.

YMCA is also the name of a group dance with cheerleader Y-M-C-A choreography invented to fit the song. One of the phases involves moving arms to form the letters Y-M-C-A as they are sung in the chorus:

Y — arms outstretched and raised upwards
M — made by bending the elbows from the 'Y' pose so the fingertips meet in front of the chest
C — arms extended to the left
A — hands held together above head

The dance originated during the group's performance of the song on the January 6, 1979 episode of American Bandstand. Host Dick Clark then said to Willis that he would like to show him something, playing the song again with the audience doing YMCA hand gestures. Willis immediately picked up on the dance and mimicked the hand movements back at the audience as other Village People members stared at him with puzzled looks. Clark then turned to Willis and said, "Victor, think you can work this dance into your routine?" Willis responded, "I think we're gonna have to." In a 2008 retrospective article for Spin, Randy Jones explained that the dance originated as a misunderstanding: the group's original choreographed dance had the group clapping above their heads during the chorus and the audience, believing them to be making the letter "Y", began following suit.

Following the fifth inning of New York Yankees baseball games at Yankee Stadium, the grounds crew traditionally grooms the infield while leading the crowd in the dance. The Bleacher Creatures used to sing "why are you gay?" to the tune when it was played but agreed in 2010 to stop doing it.

== Influence ==
In 2000, VH1 placed "Y.M.C.A." at number seven on their list of "100 Greatest Dance Songs", while Paste Magazine ranked the song number one on their list of "The 60 Best Dancefloor Classics" in February 2017. In 2022, Rolling Stone ranked it number 139 in their list of "200 Greatest Dance Songs of All Time". In 2024 and 2026, Billboard placed "Y.M.C.A." at numbers 61 and 28 on their lists of "The 100 Greatest Jock Jams of All Time" and "The Biggest No. 2 Hot 100 Hits of All Time".

The Village People recorded a version of the song for Pepsi in 1997 for a commercial featuring a group of dancing bears, changing the lyrics to match the drink and spelling out P-E-P-S-I. A few months afterwards, Pepsi used the song again as part of its new blue-themed imaging for the Pepsi Globe. In September 2000 "Y.M.C.A." was used as the Space Shuttle wake-up call on day 11 of STS-106. On December 31, 2008, "Y.M.C.A." set a Guinness World Record when 40,148 people danced to Village People's live performance of the song at the 2008 Sun Bowl game in El Paso, Texas.

In 2001, it was part of the "Swamp Karaoke Dance Party" in Shrek (2001) performed by Monsieur Hood and the Merry Men.

In 2012, in a landmark ruling in accordance with the Copyright Act of 1976, Willis terminated his copyrights granted to the publishers Can't Stop Productions and Scorpio Music. In March 2015, it was determined that the sole writers of the song were Morali and Willis.

In March 2020, the US Library of Congress added the song to its National Recording Registry, which preserves for posterity audio that is "culturally, historically or aesthetically significant". In December 2020, "Y.M.C.A." was inducted into the Grammy Hall of Fame.

=== Donald Trump-related ===
The President of the United States, Donald Trump, began using the song (as well as another Village People song, "Macho Man") to close out his rallies during his 2020 re-election campaign. Willis initially approved its use, but after several incidents involving the Black Lives Matter protests, he demanded Trump stop, although Willis later relaxed his stance. Saturday Night Live parodied the song and the group's reaction with a "cease and desist" on the October 24, 2020 segment of Weekend Update. As a result of the renewed attention, the song was back in the Top 20 on iTunes in November 2020 and hit the number 2 spot on the Billboard Dance Digital Song Sales chart. On November 6, following the media's declaration that Joe Biden had taken the lead in Pennsylvania over Trump in the 2020 presidential election, Biden supporters celebrated by dancing in the streets and singing the song across the city of Philadelphia. Trump blared the song over loudspeakers as he boarded Air Force One on January 20, 2021, en route to Florida before Biden's inauguration.

In his 2024 presidential campaign, Trump once again used the song at his rallies, usually performing his signature dance while it played. Willis lamented his use of the song since 2020 and even considered a lawsuit to block Trump from using it. Ultimately, Willis decided there was "not much he can do about it" and decided it was "beneficial" to have the song back on the charts, stating it was "good for business."

In January 2025, Village People performed the song at several events for Trump's second inauguration. On July 20, 2025, Trump shared an AI-generated video of former president Barack Obama being arrested while "Y.M.C.A." plays. The group released a joint statement saying, "We will attempt to find the original person or entity who posted the offensive video featuring President Barack Obama, and have such video taken down as not being endorsed by Village People, nor any of the owners of the copyright."

An instrumental rendition of the song was performed by the Chinese military band during Trump's visit to the People's Republic of China in 2026.

== Reception ==
Billboard stated that "Y.M.C.A." is "another example of [the Village People's] droll humor, playing off its gayness with hard hat themes." Billboard also called "Y.M.C.A." (and its B-side, "The Women") one of the best cuts on the Cruisin' album. Cash Box said that "Y.M.C.A." has "layered horn work and strings and a bright, soaring chorus" and that "Willis' lead vocals are commanding." Record World said that it "has the same foot-stomping bass line and tongue-in-cheek lyrics" as previous Village People hit "Macho Man" and that "the vocals are strong and the production thunderous".

=== Charts ===
==== Weekly charts ====
Chart (1978–1979)	Peak position
Australia (Kent Music Report)	1
Austria (Ö3 Austria Top 40)	1
Belgium (Ultratop 50 Flanders)	1
Canada Top Singles (RPM)	1
Canada Adult Contemporary (RPM)	1
Canada Disco Singles (RPM)	2
Canada Top 15 12inch (RPM)	1
Finland (Suomen virallinen lista)	1
France (SNEP)	1
Ireland (IRMA)	1
Italy (FIMI)	1
Netherlands (Dutch Top 40)	1
Netherlands (Single Top 100)	1
New Zealand (Recorded Music NZ)	1
Norway (VG-lista)	2
South Africa (Springbok Radio)	3
Spain (AFYVE)	4
Sweden (Sverigetopplistan)	1
Switzerland (Schweizer Hitparade)	1
UK Singles (OCC)	1
US Billboard Hot 100	2
US Dance Club Songs (Billboard)	2
US Hot R&B/Hip-Hop Songs (Billboard)	32
US Cash Box Top 100	3
West Germany (GfK)	1

Chart (1993–1994) (Y.M.C.A. '93)	Peak position
Australia (ARIA)	76
Europe (Eurochart Hot 100)	36
France (SNEP)	90
Ireland (IRMA)	12
New Zealand (RIANZ)	46
UK Singles (OCC)	12
UK Airplay (ERA)	88
UK Dance Singles (Music Week)	10
UK Club Chart (Music Week)	47

Chart (1999)	Peak position
UK Singles (OCC)	35
UK Dance (OCC)	28

Chart (2024)	Peak position
Dance/Electronic Digital Song Sales (OCC)	1
TikTok Billboard Top 50 (OCC)	15

==== Year-end charts ====
Chart (1978)	Rank
Australia (Kent Music Report)	50

Chart (1979)	Rank
Australia (Kent Music Report)	15
Austria (Ö3 Austria Top 40)	3
Belgium (Ultratop Flanders)	8
Canada Top Singles (RPM)	13
Netherlands (Dutch Top 40)	22
Netherlands (Single Top 100)	4
New Zealand (Recorded Music NZ)	11
Switzerland (Schweizer Hitparade)	1
UK Singles (OCC)	26
US Billboard Hot 100	8
US Cash Box Top 100	4
West Germany (Official German Charts)	3

==== All-time charts ====
Chart (1958–2018)	Position
US Billboard Hot 100	338

=== Certifications and sales ===
Certifications and sales for Y.M.C.A.
Region	Certification	Certified units/sales
Belgium	—	300,000
Canada (Music Canada)	2× Platinum	300,000^{^}
Denmark (IFPI Danmark)	Gold	45,000^{‡}
France (SNEP)	Gold	1,400,000
Germany (BVMI)	Gold	1,000,000
Italy (FIMI) sales since 2009	Gold	25,000^{‡}
Japan	—	500,000
Netherlands (NVPI)	Platinum	250,000
New Zealand (RMNZ)	2× Platinum	60,000^{‡}
Spain (Promusicae)	Gold	30,000^{‡}
United Kingdom (BPI)	Platinum	1,500,000
United States (RIAA)	3× Platinum	3,000,000^{‡}
Summaries
Worldwide	—	12,000,000
^{^} Shipments figures based on certification alone.^{‡} Sales+streaming figures based on certification alone.

== Other versions ==
=== Hideki Saijo version ===
"Young Man (Y.M.C.A.)"

Single by Hideki Saijo

from the album Young Man/Hideki Flying Up
- B-side: "Hideki Disco Special"
- Released: February 21, 1979
- Genre: Kayokyoku
- Length: 4:43
- Label: RCA; RVC
- Songwriters: Jacques Morali; Victor Willis; Henri Belolo; Ryuji Amagai
- Producer: Kazuo Ohtani

Hideki Saijo singles chronology
"Harukanaru Koibito e" (1978)	"Young Man (Y.M.C.A.)" (1979)	"Hop Step Jump" (1979)

In 1979, Japanese singer Hideki Saijo covered the song for his compilation album Young Man/Hideki Flying Up as "Young Man (Y.M.C.A.)". In Japan, the cover topped on the Oricon chart for five consecutive weeks and became the seventh best-selling single of 1979 in Japan. For the cover, the lyrics were re-written in Japanese by Saijo's manager, Ryuji Amagai. Most of the lyrics have been changed to encourage young people. This version is also notable for having a call-and-response in the middle where Saijo and a group of child singers chant the letters "Y M C A" back and forth.

==== Commercial performance ====
"Young Man (Y.M.C.A.)" debuted at number two on the Oricon Weekly Singles Chart, and in the following week, it reached number one, where it stayed for five consecutive weeks. The song finally became the seventh best-selling single of 1979 in Japan and Saijo's best-selling single to date, with the sales of 808,000 copies.

Following the death of Saijo on 16 May 2018, the song re-entered the chart, peaking at number fifteen on the Billboard Japan Hot 100.

==== Accolades ====
"Young Man (Y.M.C.A.)" won the Grand Prix at the FNS Music Festival '79 and the 10th Japan Music Awards. Despite the hit, the song was disqualified for the 21st Japan Record Awards due to the competition's guideline that requires the songs to be original work. At the award, Saijo instead won the golden award for his single, "Yuki ga Areba" (1979).

==== Cover versions ====
"Young Man (Y.M.C.A.)" has been covered by multiple other Asian musicians, including Keisuke Kuwata, Aska, George Lam, Yang Kun, and E-girls. It was covered by the Minions in the 2013 animated film Despicable Me 2.

==== Track listing ====
7-inch single

1. "Young Man (Y.M.C.A.)" – 4:43
2. "Hideki Disco Special" (Medley)

==== Charts ====
===== Weekly charts =====
Chart (1979)	Peak position
Japan (Oricon)	1

Chart (2018)	Peak position
Japan (Japan Hot 100)	15

===== Year-end charts =====
Chart (1979)	Peak position
Japan (Oricon)	7

=== Touché version ===
"Y.M.C.A."

Single by Touché

from the album Kids In America
- Released: September 14, 1998
- Recorded: 1998
- Genre: Eurodance
- Length: 3:09 (single version); 3:14 (album version)
- Label: BMG, Hansa
- Songwriters: Jacques Morali, Victor Willis
- Producer: Dieter Bohlen

Touché singles chronology
"I'll Give You My Heart" (1998)	"Y.M.C.A." (1998)	"This Goodbye Is Not Forever" (1998)

In 1998, Touché covered the hit for their album Kids in America with Krayzee. In this version Touche take over the vocal parts and only the rap contributes to Krayzee. In Belgium, this cover version was a top ten hit, while the success in the German-speaking countries, however, was rather modest.

==== Music video ====
In the music video Touche and Krayzee perform the song in a city area, accompanied by elaborate effects.

==== Track listing ====
CD maxi

1. "YMCA" (Rap Version) – 3:09
2. "YMCA" (Vocal Version) – 3:14
3. "Promise To Believe" (Touché) – 3:57
4. "I Want Your Body" (Touché) – 3:19

==== Charts ====
Chart (1998)	Peak position
German Singles Chart	31
Austrian Singles Chart	31
Swiss Singles Chart	23
Belgium (Flanders) (Ultratop)	10

== See also ==
- 1978 in music
