= Bang Bang Boom =

2000 single by the Moffatts

Single by the Moffatts

from the album Submodalities
- B-side: "All the Answers" (live); "Two Beats" (live)
- Released: July 10, 2000
- Length: 2:58
- Label: EMI
- Songwriters: Kee Marcello; Zal; Stefan Andersson
- Producer: Bob Rock

The Moffatts singles chronology
"Misery" (1999)	"Bang Bang Boom" (2000)	"Just Another Phase" (2000)

"Bang Bang Boom" is a song by Canadian pop rock band the Moffatts. It was released in July 2000 as the first single from their fourth and final album, Submodalities. The song was a hit in Canada, reaching number one on Canada's RPM 100 Hit Tracks chart. It also became a minor hit in Germany, peaking at number 71 on the German Singles Chart and spending seven weeks in the top 100. Beginning November 2012, the song–with altered composition and lyrics–was featured in LG's online campaign, "Life's Good".

== Music video ==
The music video for "Bang Bang Boom" reached number one on MuchMusic Countdown for two weeks. It features the band performing at a house party.

== Track listings ==
Canadian, German, and Australian CD single

1. "Bang Bang Boom" – 2:59
2. "All the Answers" (live recorded) – 6:47
3. "Two Beats" (live recorded) – 3:31

European CD single

1. "Bang Bang Boom" – 2:59
2. "All the Answers" (live recorded) – 6:47

== Charts ==
=== Weekly charts ===
Weekly chart performance for "Bang Bang Boom"
Chart (2000)	Peak position
Canada (Nielsen SoundScan)	1
Canada Top Singles (RPM)	1
Canada Adult Contemporary (RPM)	21
Germany (GfK)	71

=== Year-end charts ===
Year-end chart performance for "Bang Bang Boom"
Chart (2000)	Rank
Europe Border Breakers (Music & Media)	79

== Release history ==
Release dates and formats for "Bang Bang Boom"
Region	Date	Format(s)	Label(s)	Ref.
Canada	July 10, 2000	CD	EMI	
Australia	February 26, 2001	CD	EMI	
