= Cruisin' (Village People album) =

Studio album by Village People
- Released: September 25, 1978
- Recorded: 1978
- Studios: Sigma Sound, New York City
- Genre: Disco
- Length: 35:45
- Label: Casablanca
- Producer: Jacques Morali

Village People chronology
Macho Man (1978)	Cruisin' (1978)	Go West (1979)

Singles from Cruisin'
- 1. "Y.M.C.A." Released: October 17, 1978

Cruisin' is the third studio album by the American disco group Village People, released on September 25, 1978. Its title is a double entendre, referring to either simply driving around or a subtle nod to gay cruising. The album features the hits "Hot Cop" and "Y.M.C.A.", which peaked at number two on the Billboard Hot 100.

In 2003, the album was rereleased as Y.M.C.A. in continental Europe.

== Critical reception ==
Professional ratings
Review scores
Source	Rating
AllMusic	1.5/5 stars
The Encyclopedia of Popular Music	2/5 stars
Smash Hits	7/10

The Globe and Mail wrote that "Village People make disco music that is pretty much the standard stuff musically, but has some high-spirited vocal stylings and some hilarious tongue-in-cheek lyrics."

== Track listing ==
All songs written by Jacques Morali & Victor Willis.

1. "Y.M.C.A." – 4:47
2. "The Women" – 5:54
3. "I'm a Cruiser" – 7:03
4. "Hot Cop" – 6:19
5. "My Roomate" – 5:20
6. "Ups and Downs" – 6:21

== Personnel ==
- Victor Willis – lead and backing vocals
- Felipe Rose – percussion and backing vocals
- Glenn Hughes – backing vocals
- Alex Briley – backing vocals
- David Hodo – backing vocals
- Randy Jones – backing vocals

Additional personnel

- Jimmy Lee – lead guitar
- Rodger Lee – rhythm guitar
- Alfonso Carey – bass
- Nathaniel Wilkie – Rhodes piano and clavinet
- Richard Trifan – synthesizers
- Russell Dabney – drums
- Peter Whitehead – percussion
- Bitter Sweet – hand claps

== Charts ==
=== Weekly charts ===
Chart (1978–1979)	Peak position
Australian Albums (Kent Music Report)	16
Austrian Albums (Ö3 Austria)	1
Belgian Albums (BEA)	2
Canadian Albums (RPM)	2
Dutch Albums (Album Top 100)	6
Finnish Albums (Suomen virallinen lista)	2
French Albums (SNEP)	1
German Albums (Offizielle Top 100)	1
Icelandic Albums (Tónlist)	4
Japanese Albums (Oricon)	27
New Zealand Albums (RMNZ)	6
Norwegian Albums (VG-lista)	5
Portuguese Albums (Musica & Som)	10
Spanish Albums (AFE)	6
Swedish Albums (Sverigetopplistan)	3
Swiss Albums (Schweizer Hitparade)	2
UK Albums (OCC)	24
US Billboard 200	3
US Top R&B/Hip-Hop Albums (Billboard)	5
Zimbabwean Albums (ZIMA)	9

=== Year-end charts ===
Chart (1978)	Position
Canada Top Albums/CDs (RPM)	75
Chart (1979)	Position
Canada Top Albums/CDs (RPM)	14
German Albums (Offizielle Top 100)	24
US Billboard 200	12

== Certifications and sales ==
Region	Certification	Certified units/sales
Canada (Music Canada)	4× Platinum	400,000^{^}
France (SNEP)	Gold	100,000^{*}
Germany (BVMI)	Gold	500,000
Netherlands (NVPI)	Gold	50,000^{^}
United States (RIAA)	Platinum	3,000,000
^{*} Sales figures based on certification alone.^{^} Shipments figures based on certification alone.
