= Sqeezer =

German band

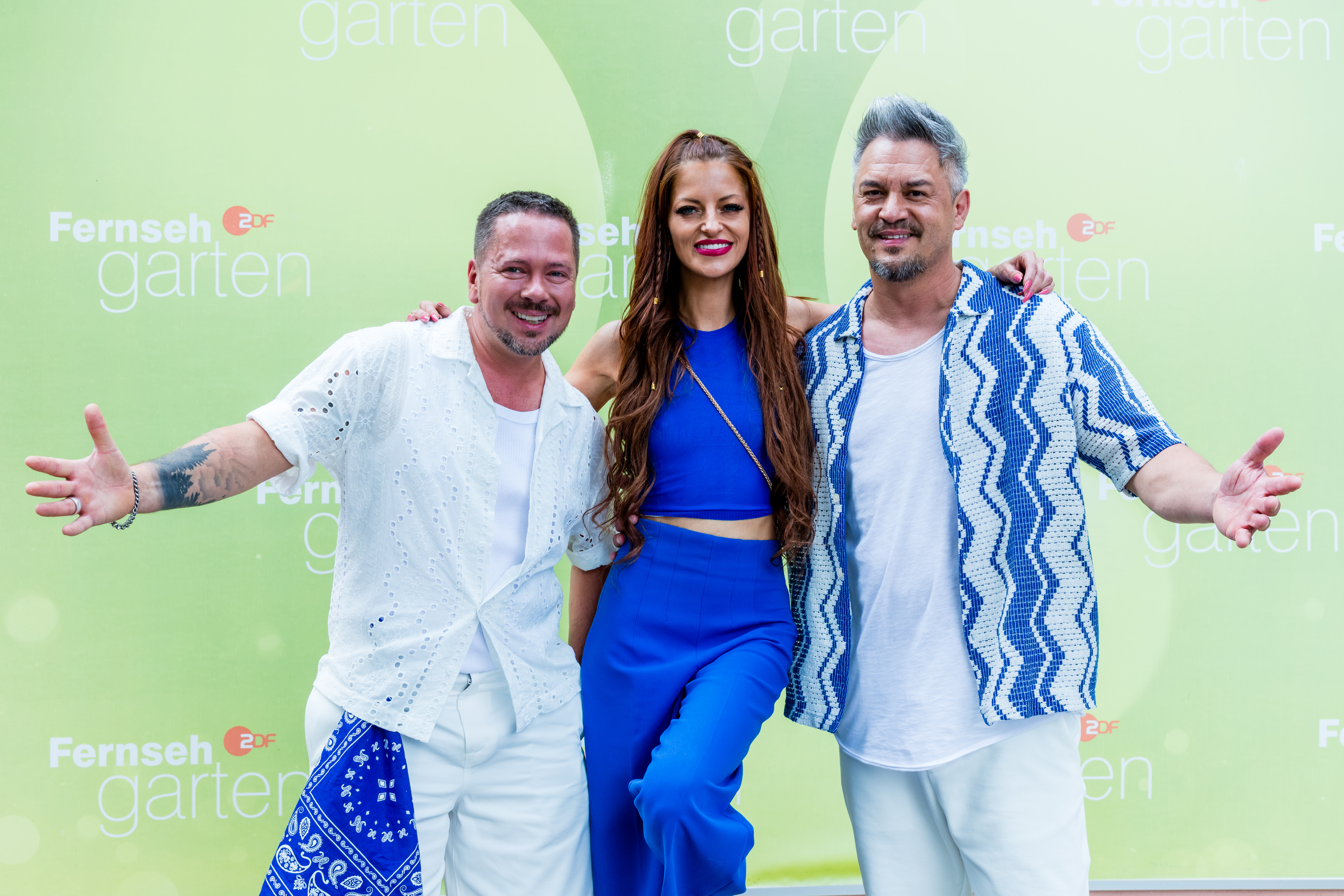
- Sqeezer in 2025

Background information
- Also known as: Squeezer
- Origin: Cologne, Germany
- Genres: Pop; reggae fusion; dance; eurodisco; house; freestyle
- Years active: 1995–2016 · 2025-present
- Labels: EMI; Wea; DA
- Past members: Jim Reeves; Yvonne Spath; Loretta Stern; Tee Jay; Marc Theven; Veronica; Heidi Goldstein; Andreas Höhnke; Eve; Nikole Arndt; Daria; Mirage; Bella Mee; Mikey Cyrox; Olivia Rehmer

Sqeezer, also Squeezer, was a German Eurodance and Pop duo formed in 1995 by Jim Reeves. Sqeezer was originally fronted by Reeves and Yvonne Spath (back dancer of Captain Jack, Culture Beat, Masterboy and after member of Funky Diamonds) . The group has sold more than 1 million records worldwide. All singles were represented more than ten million times. They are best known for their charting singles "Blue Jeans", "Sweet Kisses" and "Without You".

== Band history ==
=== 1995–97: Formation and Drop Your Pants ===
The duo was formed in 1995 by Jim Reeves. Sqeezer was originally fronted by Reeves and Yvonne Spath. They released the Berman Brothers produced debut single "Scandy Randy", when Yvonne Spath had been replaced with Loretta Stern the new face, Yvonne soon after, who left to continue to work as a dancer for Masterboy, Captain Jack and member of the girl group Funky Diamonds, where she was a member until 1999. In March 1996, Reeves and Stern were joined by the dancer Tee Jay to become a trio. The band released their debut album Drop Your Pants, followed by the singles "Blue Jeans" and "Sweet Kisses" with the latter mentioned reaching #1 in the Spanish Single Chart. Their unique sound combined Eurodance, reggae fusion and pop music mixed with samples and elements from the 1950s. In October 1996, Sqeezer went on tour as support act for the boy group Worlds Apart's "Everybody Tour".

In 1997, the fourth and final single "Saturday Night" has been released, becoming a moderate chart success, peaking #43 in the German Single Chart respectively. In 1997, Sqeezer exclusively released the song "Tamagotchi (Tschoopapa...)", which became the official Tamagotchi song in cooperation with the Saban Worldwide company. It was the lead single from the compilation album Tamagotchi Smash Hits via EMI. The group released the lead single of the second studio album, "Get It Right", a collaboration with the German boy band Bed & Breakfast and singer and host Mola Adebisi, cousin of Reeves.

=== 1998–01: Streetlife and Departure of Stern ===
In 1998, Sqeezer along with other artists released the charity single "Let The Music Heal Your Soul" as the supergroup Bravo All Stars. The song reached #36 in the UK Singles Chart in September 1998. The song reached also the Billboard Hot 100 Charts peaking at #60. In 1998, Sqeezer released their second and final studio album Streetlife, followed by the second and third single releases, the ballad "Without You" and "Wake Up", with the first mentioned becoming their biggest hit to date in Germany peaking #10 in the German Single Chart. In contrast to their previous album, Sqeezer changed their musical direction to a more mature sound, combining slower pop and reggae fusion with Hip Hop, Funk and Soul elements.

In 1999, the single only release, the ballad "Wishing You Were Here", which William Orbit-esque sound resembles Madonna's "Frozen". After this release, Stern briefly left the band to concentrate on her acting and hosting career. She had been replaced by Veronica. Still both singers could be heard on the unreleased song "Lonely Nights" during production sessions for the planned third studio album. However, in September 2001, Stern briefly returned with Veronica being replaced by model Heidi Goldstein for the single "Remember Summertime", a reworked version from the song "Summertime" from Streetlife, before departing a second time for Stern from the group, to focus on her own music and acting career, later to form a Jazz group Mathilda in 2005.

=== 2002–06: Line-up changes and Singles ===
Throughout the group's career, Sqeezer's members changed multiple times, with founder Jim Reeves always being a member in the group. Following the leavings of Stern and Goldstein, Reeves held an audition in March via RTL II News, which resulted in singer Eve and dancer Andreas Höhnke filling their places. In 2002, the trio released the single "3 Times". In 2004, Reeves, Höhnke along with new female singer Nikole Arndt, cast through a Pro7 casting agency, the single "Hot Bikini" has been released in two versions, with the clean version retitled "Hot Ski Teeny". Its music video featured cameos by Axel Schulz and Coolio. In March 2006, the group released their first extended play Drop Your Pants, which contained four new mixes of "Blue Jeans".

=== 2007–10: Comeback as Squeezer and Singles ===
In 2007, Sqeezer, now comprising Reeves, Höhnke and new singer Daria, came back rebranded as Squeezer. In March 2008, the group released the single "High Heels", co-written by Delroy Rennalls alias Lazy Dee of Mr. President fame. In their MySpace account, the group released another tracks, "Anybody", a song which previously appeared on the compilation sampler "Fantasy Dance Hits Vol. 9" and a ballad called "No Goodbye". All the songs were set to appear on Sqeezers planned third studio album with the working title Reloaded. In summer of 2007, the group toured through various music festivals in Germany and Poland. In 2008, dancer Mirage joined the band. In 2008 and 2010, the group has been featured on a DJ Beatboy single called "Hey Helicopter" and released new mixes of "High Heels".

=== 2013–16: Return to Sqeezer and Death of Reeves ===
In 2013, the band renamed their group back to Sqeezer. Reeves has been joined by singer Olivia Rehmer and Mikey Cyrox, a former The Voice of Germany participant. They appeared on several 90s festivals.

On February 1, 2016, founding member Jim Reeves died of a homicide in a hostel at Stuttgarter Platz in Berlin. According to the autopsy report he was slain. His real name was Jim Nyasani and was born on April 30, 1968. He was 47 at the time of his death. On the group's Facebook page, the remaining band members posted an official statement to Reeves death and decided to not continue the group without him. Reeves had also reportedly been raped before his death because of his homosexual harassment and the suspects are two Polish citizens aged 23 and 30. The 23 year old was deported to Germany after finishing his prison sentence in Poland for other crimes, while the other was caught in Barcelona carrying fake documents, three mobile phones and a large amount of cash.

== Artistry ==
=== Music ===
Sqeezer is best known for catchy, good mood, high energy dance songs such as "Scandy Randy", "Blue Jeans" or "Sweet Kisses" or reggae fusion songs such as "Saturday Night", "Hey Helicopter" or "Remember Summertime" with easy beats, sounds, melodies and simple, sometimes grammatically flawed, lyrics. This style was very famous and popular in Europe, Oceania and South America at that time. The style of eurodance was dance music with a female singer and a male rapper to follow a traditional verse-chorus structure. However Reeves served as both, a rapper and a singer for the verses while the female singer sings the refrain. Although the group also released ballads such as "Without You", "Let The Music Heal Your Soul" or "Wishing You Were Here". Other genres include pop mixed with funk and soul such as "Wake Up". While mixing dance, reggae fusion and pop music with samples and elements from the 1950s on the debut album Drop Your Pants, Sqeezer changed their musical direction on Streetlife to a more mature sound, combining slower pop and reggae fusion with Hip Hop, Funk and Soul elements. Sqeezer sang in English and French, such on the French version of "Blue Jeans".

=== Public Image ===
Known as a bubblegum act, Sqeezer rebranded their band name with the correct spelling Squeezer from 2007 to 2013 for a more mature look. However, later they changed their name back to the wrong spelling. Starting as a duo with Reeves as a rapper/singer and a female singer, the group soon later became a trio including a dancer. The band has been presented by numerous of performers. Ever since it has been an open secret, that German singer Alexandra Prince is the real voice of the first two albums and the Real voice Behind Another German Project Blumchen, which is most likely true, though yet never confirmed. The proof has been more given when Spath and Stern appeared with their real singing voices on other musical projects such as Funky Diamonds and Mathilda. Recently petitions came up for Alex Prince to re-record a new version of "Without You" alongside Reeves' good friend LayZee, former rapper of Mr. President, in honor for Reeves death.

== Other ventures ==
Next to his musical career, Reeves has always modeled for campaigns such as C&A, Sony, Swatch and Schöller Mövenpick. Reeves also sang a jingle for the Hamburg based drug store Budnikowsky. In 1997, Reeves advertised for Camerafilms for the brand ORWO. Also in 1997, Sqeezer exclusively released the song "Tamagotchi (Tschoopapa...)", which became the official Tamagotchi song in cooperation with the Saban Worldwide company. To promote their music in America, Sqeezer signed a deal with Foot Locker, where their song "Hot Bikini" was featured in July 2007 in Canada in most of their stores.

== Members ==
1995–1997

- Jim Reeves (1995–2016) (deceased)
- Yvonne Spath (1995–March 1996)
- Loretta Stern (March 1996–July 2001)
- Tee Jay (March 1996 – 1997)
- Marc Theven (January 1997–September 1997) (deceased)

1999–2001

- Jim Reeves
- Loretta Stern
- Veronica (1999)
- Heidi Goldstein (2001)

2002–2006

- Jim Reeves
- Eve (2002)
- Nikole Arndt (2003–2004)
- Andreas Höhnke (2002–2008)

2007–2010

- Jim Reeves
- Daria (2007)
- Mirage (2008–2009)

2013–2016

- Jim Reeves
- Bella Mee (2013)
- Olivia Rehmer (2014–2016)
- Mikey Cyrox (2013–2016)

2025 - since

- Andreas Buttscheidt (2025 - since)
- Xenia Prinzessin von Sachsen (2025 - since)
- Pravit Anantapongse' (2025 - since)

== Discography ==
- Drop Your Pants (1996)
- Streetlife (1998)

== Tours ==
Headlining

- Squeezer Tour (2007)

Opening act

- Worlds Apart - Everybody Tour (1996)

== Accolades ==
- 1997: RSH-Gold - Newcomer of the year
