= I'll Be There for You (The Moffatts song) =

1998 single by the Moffatts

Single by the Moffatts

from the album Chapter I: A New Beginning
- Released: April 8, 1998
- Length: 4:16
- Label: EMI
- Songwriter: The Moffatts
- Producers: David Brunner; the Berman Brothers

The Moffatts singles chronology
| "Guns of Love" (1995) | "I'll Be There for You" (1998) | "Miss You Like Crazy" (1998) |

Audio
- "I'll Be There for You" on YouTube

"I'll Be There for You" is a song by Canadian pop rock band the Moffatts. It was released in April 1998 as the first single from their third album, Chapter I: A New Beginning. The song was a hit in Canada, reaching No. 5 on The Record's single chart and No. 25 on the RPM Adult Contemporary chart. Dave Moffatt sings lead on the verses, and Dave and Scott Moffatt both share lead vocal duties on the chorus.

== Music video ==
The music video was directed by Lionel C. Martin and premiered in 1998. The video features the Moffatts performing in a garage on a stormy day. Their garage band performance is being watched in various locations: in the living room of a young couple while they eat popcorn; in the bedroom of a girls' slumber party; and through the window of a pawn shop. The video ends with the Moffatts walking to the pawn shop windows where they notice their performance.

== Track listing ==
1. "I'll Be There for You" (radio edit) – 3:39
2. "I'll Be There for You" (long version) – 4:16
3. "I'll Be There for You" (instrumental) – 3:39
4. "Now and Forever" – 3:18

== Charts ==
| Chart (1998) | Peak position |
|---|---|
| Austria (Ö3 Austria Top 40) | 24 |
| Canada Top Singles (RPM) | 13 |
| Canada (The Record) | 5 |
| Canada Adult Contemporary (RPM) | 25 |
| Germany (GfK) | 41 |
| Spain Airplay (Top 40 Radio) | 7 |
| Switzerland (Schweizer Hitparade) | 21 |
| Sweden (Sverigetopplistan) | 34 |

== Release history ==
| Region | Date | Format(s) | Label(s) | Ref. |
|---|---|---|---|---|
| Canada | April 8, 1998 | —N/a | EMI Music Canada | |
| Japan | April 16, 1998 | CD | EMI | |
