= The Meaning of Happy =

Studio album by Same Same
- Released: March 26, 2006
- Genre: Pop
- Label: Sony BMG
- Producer: Warut Rintranukul

The Meaning of Happy is the sole album by the pop duo Same Same, released in 2006.

== Track listing ==
1. "Supermodel" (Bob Moffatt, Clint Moffatt, Paul Cimolini) – 3:05
2. "City Lights" (B. Moffatt, C. Moffatt) – 3:58
3. "Without You" (featuring Lovi Poe) (B. Moffatt, C. Moffatt, Warut Rintranukul) – 3:41
4. "Downtown" (B. Moffatt, C. Moffatt) – 3:06
5. "I'm Still in Love with You" (B. Moffatt, C. Moffatt) – 4:21
6. "Love Isn't" (B. Moffatt, C. Moffatt) – 4:08
7. "Strange Lover" (B. Moffatt, C. Moffatt) – 4:51
8. "Hearts Collide" (B. Moffatt, C. Moffatt, Prawech Nopnirapath) – 4:17
9. "The Meaning of Happy" (B. Moffatt, C. Moffatt) – 3:21
10. "Stay" (B. Moffatt, C. Moffatt, P. Nopnirapath) – 4:03
11. "I Waited Too Long" (B. Moffatt, C. Moffatt) – 4:50
12. "Tell Me" (B. Moffatt, C. Moffatt, W. Rintranukul) – 4:09
13. "Farang Ja" (featuring Arpaporn) (B. Moffatt, C. Moffatt, Arpaporn) – 4:55
14. "Without You" (featuring Nui) (B. Moffatt, C. Moffatt, W. Rintranukul, Lovely Lina) – 3:53
15. "Supermodel" (Asian Embassy Remix) (B. Moffatt, C. Moffatt, P. Cimolini) – 3:25
16. "City Lights" (Mr. Z Trance Remix) (B. Moffatt, C. Moffatt) – 5:39
17. "Supermodel" (Turtle Beat Masala Remix) (B. Moffatt, C. Moffatt, P. Cimolini) – 3:04

== Credits ==
- Suthiti Chaisamut – Drum Technician
- Chonrada Chayachinda – A&R Coordinator
- Alex Clayton – Photography
- Phil Demetro – Mastering
- Gerald Dibbayawan – Managing Director, Executive Producer
- Amornrat Homhoul – A&R Director
- Jennita Itthi-angkul – Styling
- Jettapol Khan – Additional Mastering
- Petcharat Lapthananchaiwong – Marketing Manager
- Bob Moffatt – drums, percussion, Lead and Background vocals, Co-producer, Engineering, Pro Tools Editing
- Clint Moffatt – Bass, Lead and Background Vocals, Co-producer
- Frank Moffatt – Executive Producer
- Prawech Nopnirapath – acoustic guitar, electric guitar, Co-producer
- Napatsorn Pongvijit – Creative Manager
- Suriya Puengthongthai – Acoustic Guitar, Electric guitar
- Warut Rintranukul – Keyboard, Programming, Producer, Engineering, Mixing
- Blue Satittammonoon – A&R Executive
- Apirat Techavachara – A&R Coordinator
- Saharat Vanchompoo – Marketing Director

== Additional information ==
- Recorded and mixed at Polarbear Studio and Sevendogs' Homebase in Bangkok, Thailand
- "Supermodel" (Asian Embassy Remix) was remixed by Michael Piroon of Asian Embassy
- "City Lights" (Trance Remix) was remixed by Zomkiat Ariyachaipanich (Mr. Z)
