= Submodalities =

Studio album by the Moffatts
- Released: October 2, 2000
- Genre: Alternative rock, pop rock, hard rock
- Label: Capitol
- Producer: Bob Rock

The Moffatts chronology
Chapter I: A New Beginning (1998)	Submodalities (2000)	Best of the Moffatts (2006)

Submodalities is the fourth studio album by Canadian pop rock group the Moffatts. The album debuted at No. 8 on the Canadian Albums Chart and went platinum, assisted by their No. 1 hit single "Bang Bang Boom". Produced by a fellow Canadian Bob Rock, the album saw the departure from the band's earlier pop sound from their previous releases into a darker, rock-oriented sound.

== Track listing ==
No.	Title	Length
1.	"Just Another Phase"	4:12
2.	"Bang Bang Boom"	2:58
3.	"California"	3:43
4.	"Always in My Heart"	3:14
5.	"Typical"	3:10
6.	"Walking Behind"	3:37
7.	"Antifreeze & Aeroplanes"	4:25
8.	"I Don't Want You To Want Me"	3:20
9.	"Life on Mars"	3:23
10.	"Who Do You Love"	4:08
11.	"Call The Doctor (She's in My Head)"	2:45
12.	"Spy" (contains the hidden tracks "Destiny" – 9:05 following five minutes of silence, and "Kill the Seagulls" – 2:42 following another minute of silence)	6:50/24:37

== B - Sides ==
No.	Title	Length
1.	"All The Answers" (live recorded)	6:48
2.	"Destiny" (live recorded)	9:11
3.	"Hallucinating" (live recorded)	4:18
4.	"In My Dreams" (live recorded)	3:30
5.	"Kill The Seagulls (a.k.a. Submodalities)"	2:33
6.	"Two Beats" (live recorded)	3:30
7.	"Why (Reggae Version)" (live recorded)	5:00

== Chart positions ==
(2000)	Peak position
Canadian Albums (Billboard)	8
German Albums (GfK Entertainment)	93

=== Year-end charts ===
Chart (2000)	Position
Canadian Albums (Nielsen SoundScan)	170

=== Sales and certifications ===
Region	Certification	Certified units/sales
Canada (Music Canada)	Platinum	100,000^{^}
^{^} Shipments figures based on certification alone.
