= Hot Cop =

- Label to Brazilian release as B-side of "Y.M.C.A." single

Single by Village People

from the album Cruisin'
- Released: September 25, 1978
- Recorded: 1978
- Studio: Sigma Sound, New York City
- Genre: Disco
- Length: 6:19
- Label: Casablanca
- Songwriter(s): Jacques Morali; Victor Willis
- Producer(s): Jacques Morali

"Hot Cop" is a song by the American disco group Village People recorded for their third studio album Cruisin' (1978). It was written by Jacques Morali and Village People lead singer Victor Willis. It served as Willis' theme song with the Village People. Although not released as a single, it was a disco hit. A medley with "Y.M.C.A." reached number 2 on Billboard's Hot Disco Singles chart.

== Composition ==
"Hot Cop" is a mid-tempo disco song. Its danceability is enhanced by its cyclical beat. Allmusic critic Amy Hanson describes the vocals as having a "funk style" that ranges from "righteous rolling to spoken word come-ons a la Earth, Wind & Fire." The bassline is similar to that which Spandau Ballet would use on their early songs. The lyrics are somewhat self-referential, as Willis dressed as a "Hot Cop" within the Village People concept, wearing a full policeman uniform.

== Reception ==
Although Allmusic critic Amy Hanson found "Hot Cop" to be "dismally boring" she describes it as a "tribute to the triumph of the disco scene, as Victor Willis patrolled the floors, letting all who dared to dance know, 'this is the hot cop talking to you. I want everybody to get on their feet.'" "Hot Cop" was a disco hit during the late 1970s disco scene. A medley with "Y.M.C.A." reached number 2 on Billboard's Dance Music/Club Play Singles chart. Allmusic's Hanson praises the song's vocals, both the "powerful vocals" of lead singer Willis and the backing vocals provided by the other Village People members. Marc Zakem of The Courier-Journal praises the lyrical wit and musical vitality of "Hot Cop" stating that it is "the first disco song I've heard in a long time in which I can actually imagine a roomful of dancing people." and Paul Green of Billboard criticizes the "standard disco cliche" of the refrain, with its "Party, boogie, boogie" lyrics. Classic Rock History critic Brian Kachejian rated it the Village People's 9th greatest song.

== Other appearances ==
The Village People performed "Hot Cop" on the first episode of Dance Fever on January 13, 1979. They also performed "Hot Cop" on The Midnight Special on January 27, 1979.

A live version of "Hot Cop" was included on the Village People's 1979 album Live and Sleazy. Billboard Magazine rated it as one of the "best cuts" from Live and Sleazy. The Village People performed the song in Jean Yanne's 1978 French musical film Je te tiens, tu me tiens par la barbichette. It has been included on a number of Village People compilation albums, including Greatest Hits and The Best of Village People.

== Chart performance ==
=== Weekly charts ===
Chart (1978)	Peak position
US Billboard Hot Disco Singles	2
