= Sweet Kisses (Sqeezer song) =

- CD maxi - Europe

Single by Sqeezer

from the album Drop Your Pants
- Released: 10 August 1996 (Germany); 11 October 1996 (The Remixes); Spring 1997 (Spain & Mexico)
- Recorded: 1996
- Genre: Europop; dancehall; Eurodance; disco; Eurohouse; house
- Length: 3:47
- Label: Cologne Dance Label; EMI
- Songwriter: Berman Brothers
- Producers: Jim Reeves; N-Dee; Frank Lio

Sqeezer singles chronology
"Blue Jeans" (1996)	"Sweet Kisses" (1996)	"Saturday Night" (1997)

"Sweet Kisses" is a song by German dance-pop group Sqeezer. It was released on 10 August 1996 as the third single from their debut album, Drop Your Pants (1996). "Sweet Kisses (The Hit Mixes)" was released on 11 October 1996. "Sweet Kisses" became a European hit, ranking at number 24 on the Eurochart Hot 100. It peaked at number-one in Spain, on the AFYVE chart and number ten in the Czech Republic.

== Track listing ==
- Europe CD-maxi
1. "Sweet Kisses" (Video/Radio Version) – 3:47
2. "Sweet Kisses" (Extended Mix) – 5:22
3. "Sweet Kisses" (Beam's House Kisses) – 6:07
4. "Sweet Kisses" (Sing & Kiss Along) – 3:47
5. "Roller Baby" – 3:59
- Europe (The Hit Mixes) CD-maxi
1. "Sweet Kisses" (Kiss Your Radio) – 3:47
2. "Sweet Kisses" (Put Your Lips Together) – 5:38
3. "Sweet Kisses" (Red & Housy Lips) – 6:00
4. "Sweet Kisses" (Don't Talk But Kiss) – 5:38
- Europe vinyl 12"
1. "Sweet Kisses" (Extended Mix) – 5:22
2. "Sweet Kisses" (Video/Radio Version) – 3:47
3. "Sweet Kisses" (Beam's House Kisses) – 6:07
- Spain vinyl 12"
1. "Sweet Kisses" (Extended Mix) – 5:22
2. "Sweet Kisses" (Beam's House Kisses) – 6:07
3. "Sweet Kisses" (Video/Radio Version) – 3:47
- Mexico CD-maxi
1. "Sweet Kisses" (Video/Radio Version) – 3:47
2. "Sweet Kisses" (Extended Mix) – 5:22
3. "Sweet Kisses" (Beam's House Kisses) – 6:07
4. "Sweet Kisses" (Sing & Kiss Along) – 3:47
5. "Roller Baby" – 3:59
- Spain CD-maxi
1. "Sweet Kisses" (Video/Radio Version) – 3:47
2. "Sweet Kisses" (Extended Mix) – 5:22
3. "Sweet Kisses" (Beam's House Kisses) – 6:07
4. "Sweet Kisses" (Sing & Kiss Along) – 3:47
5. "Roller Baby" – 3:59

== Charts ==
=== Weekly charts ===
Chart (1996–97)	Peak position
Czech Republic (IFPI CR)	10
Europe (Eurochart Hot 100)	24
Germany (Media Control Charts)	24
Spain (AFYVE)	1

=== Year-end charts ===
Chart (1997)	Position
Germany (Media Control Charts)	62
Spain (AFYVE)	2
