= Touché (band) =

German boy band

- Origin: Germany
- Genres: Pop
- Years active: 1996–2003, 2015–present
- Labels: Sony BMG
- Members: Alexander Geist; Martin Scholz; Pravit Anantapongse (since 2015); Markus Klopfer (since 2015)
- Past members: Dennis Frey (1996-2001); Glenn Frey (1996-2001); Karim Maataoui (1996-1999); Stuart Fords (1999-2001); Christopher Reuter (2002-2003)

Touché is a German boy band famous from the mid- to late 1990s, created and produced by Dieter Bohlen (a member of Modern Talking), who wrote most of the music and lyrics and choreographed for the project.

The band performed in its original lineup until March 1999, when Karim Maataoui left following disagreement with other band members. He was replaced later that year by Stuart Fords. After unfruitful attempts to repeat the success of previous releases, Glenn and Dennis Frey decided to quit the band in 2001. They were replaced by Donny Weiss and Christopher Reuter. The new lineup released one single, "Can't Hurry Love" in 2002, and the group split a year later.

The band is best remembered for hits such as "This Goodbye Is Not Forever", "I'll Give You My Heart", and "I Can't Get No Sleep". Touché also heavily featured on the international hit single by The Bravo All Stars, "Let the Music Heal Your Soul".

The group was reunited in 2015 with Martin Scholz and Alexander Geist from the original lineup and two new members: Markus Klopfer and Pravit Anantapongse. Stuart and the Frey brothers were not invited back

== Discography ==
=== Albums ===
==== Studio albums ====
- Part One (1997)
- Kids in America (1998)
- Another Part of Us (2000)

==== Compilation Album ====
- I'll Give You My Heart (2001)

=== Singles ===
Year	Single	Peak positions				Album
Year	Single	GER	AUT	SWI	BEL (WA)	Album
1997	"I Can't Get No Sleep"	52	—	—	—	Part One
1997	"I Want You Back, I Want Your Heart"	51	—	—	—	Part One
1998	"I'll Give You My Heart"	79	—	—	—	Part One
1998	"Y.M.C.A." (feat. Krayzee)	31	31	23	10	Kids In America
1998	"This Goodbye Is Not Forever"	27	26	21	—	Kids In America
1999	"Kids in America"	63	—	—	—	Kids In America
1999	"Dinner in Heaven"	—	—	—	—	Another Part of Us
2000	"Heaven Is for Everyone"	—	—	—	—	Another Part of Us
2002	"Can't Hurry Love"	—	—	—	—	single only
"—" denotes releases that did not chart or were not released.
