= R'n'G =

Dutch hip-hop duo

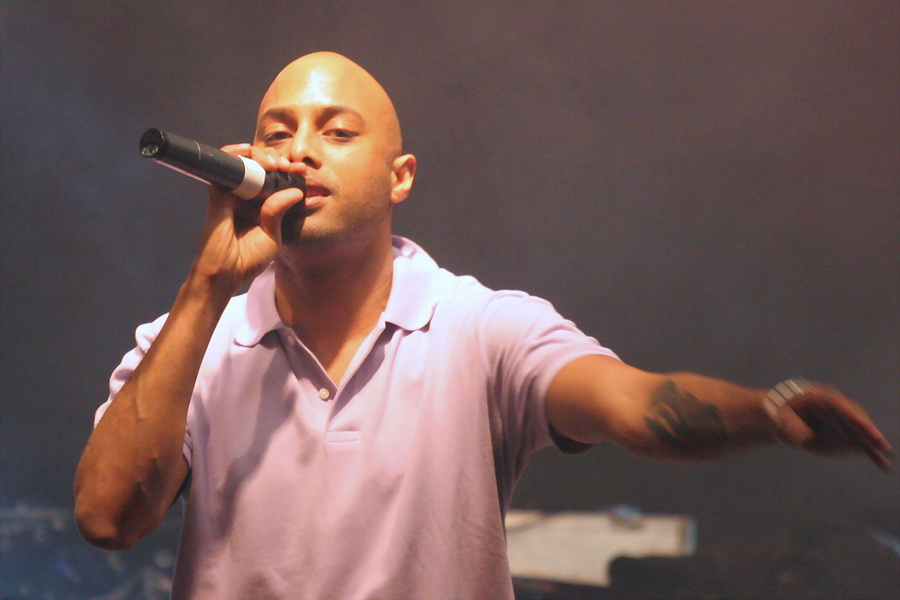
- Gerrel Koningsverdraag (Jay Delano) during the concert in Poland

Background information
- Origin: Netherlands
- Genres: Hip hop, R&B, pop
- Years active: 1996–present
- Labels: Motor Music (1997–1999); Universal Music (2001–2006)

R'n'G are a Dutch hip-hop duo, founded in 1996. Its members are rapper Ricardo Overman and singer/rapper Gerrel Koningsverdraag (Jay Delano). They were part of the Bravo All Stars charity group who recorded "Let the Music Heal Your Soul" in 1998 that peaked at #36 on the UK Singles Chart.

== Studio albums ==
- The Year of R'n'G (1998) cover and info (Poland: Gold)
- The Right Time (2001) cover and info
- Generations (2006) cover and info

== Singles ==
Year	Single	Peak chart positions			Album
Year	Single	GER	AUT	SWI	Album
1997	"Rhythm of My Heart"	35	—	—	The Year of R'n'G
1997	"Here Comes the Sun"	21	—	—	The Year of R'n'G
1998	"Open Up Your Mind"	14	27	17	The Year of R'n'G
1998	"Can't U Ce"	30	—	—	The Year of R'n'G
1998	"I Love Your Smile"	47	—	—	The Year of R'n'G
1998	"Darlin'... I Think About You!"	73	—	—	The Year of R'n'G
1999	"Tequila"	97	—	—	Don't Give Up / The Right Time
2000	"Are U Ready?"	—	—	—	Don't Give Up / The Right Time
2006	"Radio Heartbeat"	100	—	—	Generations
"—" denotes releases that did not chart or were not released.

== Videos ==
- "Here Comes the Sun" (1997) - music video on YouTube
- "Rhythm of My Heart" (1997) - music video on YouTube
- "Open Up Your Mind" (1998) - music video on YouTube
- "Can't U Ce?" (1998) - music video on YouTube
- "I Love Your Smile" (1998) - music video on YouTube
- "Darlin'...I Think About You" (1998) - music video on YouTube
- "We'll Be Together" featuring Natalia Kukulska (1998) - music video on YouTube
- "Can't Talk About It" (1998) - music video on YouTube
- "Children of the World" (1998)
- "Tequila" / "I Wish I Could" (1999) - music video on YouTube
- "Are U Ready?" (2000) - music video on YouTube
- "Don't Give Up" (2001)
- "Miracle" (2001) - music video on YouTube
- "Radio Heartbeat" (2005) - music video on YouTube
- "I'm in Love" / "Ochie Walla" featuring Chicanoz (2006) - music video on YouTube

== See also ==
- Bravo All Stars
- Cosmopop
