= Blue Jeans (Sqeezer song) =

- CD maxi - Europe

Single by Sqeezer

from the album Drop Your Pants
- Released: 02 May 1996 (Germany); 27 June 1996 (Europe); 22 September 1996 (Mexico); 1997 (Spain)
- Recorded: 1995
- Genre: Europop; dancehall; Eurodance; house; hi-NRG
- Length: 3:48
- Label: Cologne Dance Label; EMI
- Songwriter: Berman Brothers
- Producers: Jim Reeves; N-Dee

Sqeezer singles chronology
"Scandy Randy" (1995)	"Blue Jeans" (1996)	"Sweet Kisses" (1996)

"Blue Jeans" is a song by German dance-pop group Sqeezer. It was released in May 1996 as the second single from their debut album, Drop Your Pants (1996). The song was ranked at number 81 on the Eurochart Hot 100, and charted at number eight in the Czech Republic, number 16 in Germany and at number 28 in Austria. In 1997, it peaked at number 11 in Spain, on the Productores de Música de España chart. The song's melody has been adapted in several Filipino recordings, including Baywalk Bodies' "Kiliti," Vhong Navarro's "Don Romantiko," and Mei Mei's "Alembong." These versions reinterpret the melody in a style reminiscent of 1950s–1960s doo-wop and novelty pop, rather than the original Eurodance arrangement.

== Track listing ==
- Europe (Der Hit Mit Dem >>Drop Your Pants<<) CD-maxi
1. "Blue Jeans" (Radio-/Video Hit-Single) – 3:48
2. "Blue Jeans" (Dance-Radio Single) – 3:59
3. "Blue Jeans" (Drop Your Pants Mix) – 5:25
4. "Blue Jeans" (Hot Pants Maxi Mix) – 7:04
5. "Blue Jeans" (Ola Ela Mix) – 5:17
- Germany (Drop Your Pants) (Summer Party Mix) CD-maxi
1. "Blue Jeans" (New Radio Single) – 3:48
2. "Blue Jeans" (Speedy Vespa Jeans Single) – 3:59
3. "Blue Jeans" (Drop Your Pants Mix) – 7:55
4. "Blue Jeans" (European Blue Jeans) – 5:31
- Germany vinyl 12"
1. "Blue Jeans" (Drop Your Pants House-Mix) – 7:55
2. "Blue Jeans" (New Radio Single) – 3:48
3. "Blue Jeans" (European Blue Jeans) – 5:31
4. "Blue Jeans" (Speedy Vespa Jeans Single) – 3:59
- Spain vinyl 12"
1. "Blue Jeans" (European Blue Jeans) – 5:31
2. "Blue Jeans" (Drop Your Pants Mix) – 5:25
- Europe (New French Hit Version) CD-maxi
1. "Blue Jeans" (Franzosische Radio Version) – 3:48
2. "Blue Jeans" (Dance-Radio Single) – 3:59
- Spain
1. "Blue Jeans" (Radio-/Video Hit-Single) – 3:48
2. "Blue Jeans" (Dance-Radio Single) – 3:59
3. "Blue Jeans" (European Blue Jeans) – 5:31
4. "Blue Jeans" (Drop Your Pants Mix) – 5:25
5. "Blue Jeans" (Ola Ela Mix) – 5:17

== Charts ==
=== Weekly charts ===
Chart (1996–97)	Peak position
Austria (Ö3 Austria Top 40	28
Czech Republic (IFPI CR)	8
Europe (European Hot 100)	81
Germany (Media Control Charts)	16
Spain (AFYVE)	11

=== Year-end charts ===
Chart (1996)	Position
Germany (Official German Charts)	96
