= Streetlife (Sqeezer album) =

Studio album by Sqeezer
- Released: 25 December 1998
- Length: 58:48
- Label: Akropolis; EMI Electrola
- Producer: Mike Dippon; Frank Lio; N-Dee

Sqeezer chronology
Drop Your Pants (1996)	Streetlife (1998)

Singles from Streetlife
- 1. "Without You" Released: 1998; 2. "Wake Up!" Released: 1998

Streetlife is the second studio album by German-based Eurodance group Sqeezer. It was released by Akropolis Music in association with EMI Electrola in 1998.

== Track listing ==
No.	Title	Writer(s)	Producer(s)	Length
1.	"Street Jam (Part 1)"	N-Dee; Frank Lio; Mike Dippon	N-Dee; Lio	0:59
2.	"Get It Right"	David Jost; Jim Reeves; Mola Adebisi	N-Dee; Lio	3:49
3.	"Without You"	N-Dee; Lio	N-Dee; Lio	3:39
4.	"Crazy"	Jost; J. Reeves; Tereza Reeves	N-Dee; Lio; Dippon	4:15
5.	"Wake Up!"	N-Dee; Lio	N-Dee; Lio	5:17
6.	"Summertime"	Jost; N-Dee; Lio	N-Dee; Lio	3:51
7.	"Turn Me Upside Down"	Jost; J. Reeves	N-Dee; Lio; Dippon	3:51
8.	"Street Jam"	N-Dee; Lio; Dippon	N-Dee; Lio; Dippon	4:14
9.	"Boom Boom"	Jost; J. Reeves; T. Reeves	N-Dee; Lio; Dippon	4:01
10.	"Be My Little Baby"	Jost; J. Reeves; T. Reeves	N-Dee; Lio; Dippon	3:40
11.	"Beach Party"	N-Dee; Lio; Lori Stern	N-Dee; Lio	3:19
12.	"Pink Cadillac"	N-Dee; Lio	N-Dee; Lio	3:37
13.	"Happy"	Bernard Jackson; David Conley; David Townsend	N-Dee; Lio; Dippon	4:08
14.	"Sqeezer Party"	Jost; J. Reeves; T. Reeves	N-Dee; Lio; Dippon	4:20
15.	"Wake Up!" (Bonus Mix)	N-Dee; Lio	N-Dee; Lio	4:20
16.	"Street Jam (Part 2)"	N-Dee; Lio; Dippon	N-Dee; Lio	0:24

== Charts ==
Chart (1998)	Peak position
German Albums (Offizielle Top 100)	77
