= Gil Ofarim =

German singer, songwriter, and actor

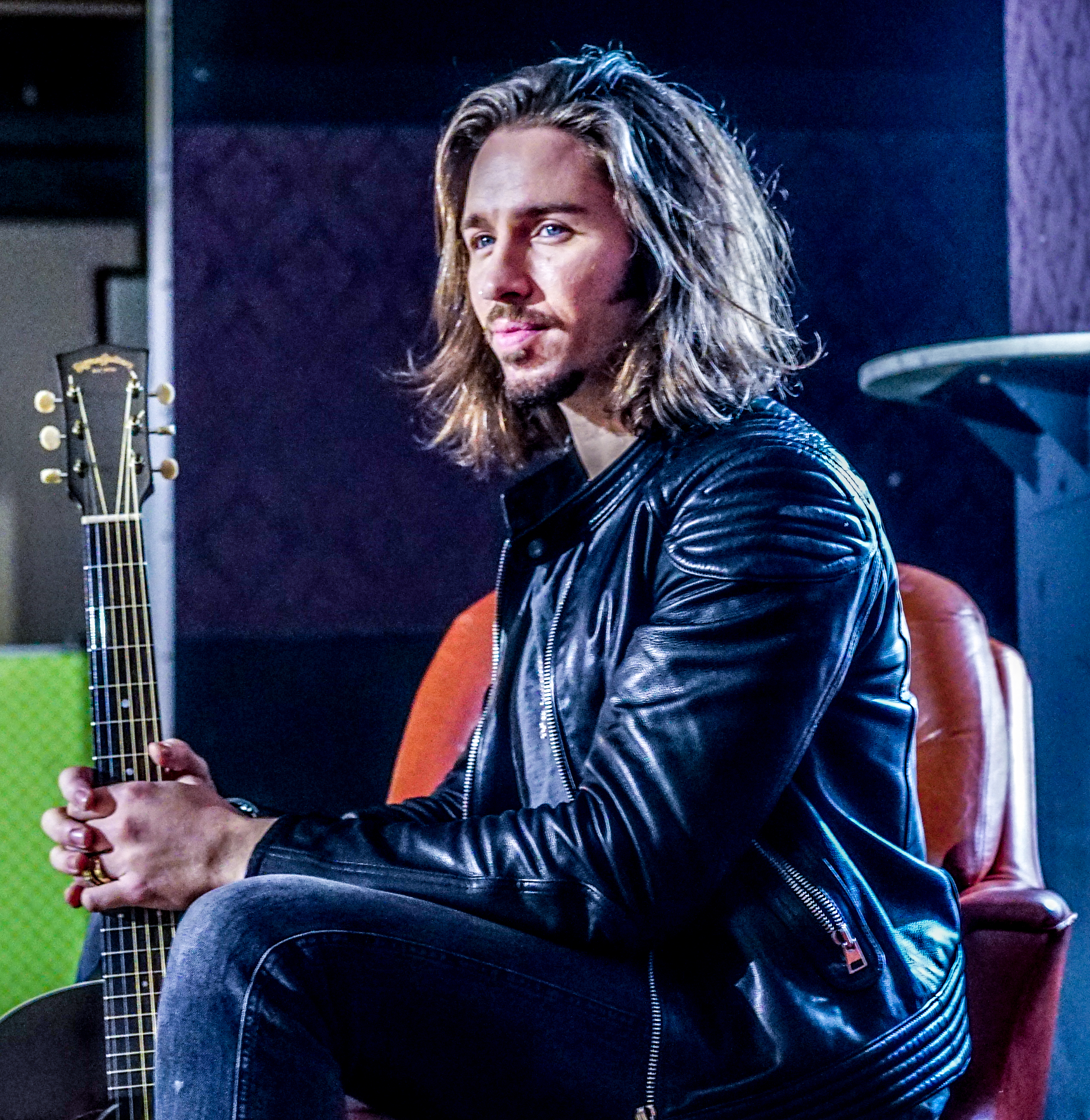
- Ofarim in 2018.

Background information
- Born: Gil Doron Reichstadt Ofarim; 13 August 1982 (age 44); Munich, West Germany
- Genres: Pop; pop rock
- Occupations: Singer; songwriter; actor
- Instrument: Electric guitar
- Years active: 1997–present
- Website: gilofarim.com

Gil Doron Reichstadt Ofarim (born 13 August 1982) is a German singer, songwriter, and actor, also known as the lead singer of the bands Zoo Army and Acht.

== Early life ==
Ofarim is the first child of Israeli musician Abi Ofarim (1937–2018) and his third wife Sandra. He has a younger brother, Tal, a musician, who was born in 1984. Gil speaks German, Hebrew and English. He sings in English and German.

== Music career ==
Ofarim's showbiz career took off in May 1997 when he was spotted in a Munich underground station by a talent scout for Bravo magazine and was asked to do a pictorial story spread. The article generated thousands of letters from fans and he landed a recording contract with BMG. His first single "Round 'n' Round (It Goes)" was released in November 1997 and became a top 40 hit in Germany. Ofarim's debut album Here I Am was released to international success in May 1998.

=== 2003–2007: On My Own ===
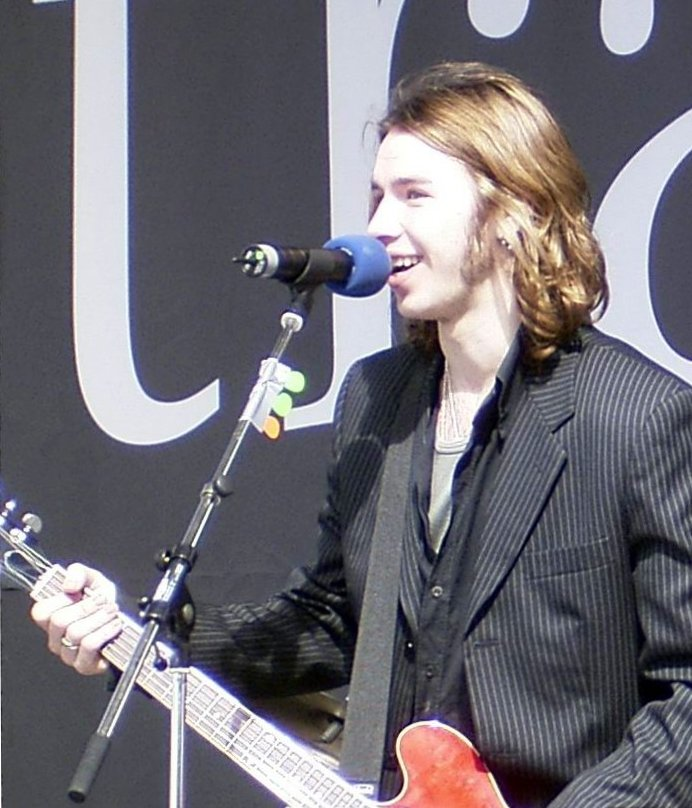
Ofarim on stage at the Hockenheimring in 2004.

After several other successful singles, Ofarim became increasingly disenchanted with being a teen idol. His 2003 album On My Own, released on Neotone Records, showcased his move in a different musical direction, taking his work further into the pop rock and adult contemporary genres. While the album failed to chart, it produced the single "The Reason" and led to a stint as Bon Jovi's opening act on the German leg of their Bounce Tour. In 2004, Ofarim ventured into acting when he co-starred in the ProSieben coming-of-age film Endlich Sex! alongside Jasmin Schwiers. In it, he played musician Christoph, the love interest of lead role Saskia. The film was broadcast to moderate ratings but was largely panned by critics. Ofarim performed several songs in Endlich Sex!, including "In Your Eyes" which was released by Neotone as a single in March 2004.

Starting in 2005, Ofarim became the lead singer of the rock band Zoo Army, also consisting of his brother Tal, Roland Söns and Dominik Scholz. They released their first single "I'm Alive" and their debut album 507 in the first half of 2006. The same year, he had a supporting role in the RTL two-part television drama film Storm Tide, a fictionalized ensemble story depicting the events surrounding the North Sea flood of 1962. Starring a roster of bankable television actors such as Jan Josef Liefers and Götz George, the film earned largely favorable reviews and strong ratings. Also in 2016, Ofarim played the lead role in the American b movie Strip Mind, which opened in Germany on 3 January 2007. The psychological thriller was largely panned by critics who criticized its casting, pacing and the "horrible" synchronization. The following year, Disney consulted him to record "So nah," the German version of Jon McLaughlin's "So Close" from the musical fantasy film Enchanted (2007) as well as "Mehr als du seh’n kannst," a re-written version of Rufus Wainwright's "Another Believer," for the animated science fiction comedy film Meet the Robinsons (2007).

=== 2008–present: Band career and Alles auf Hoffnung ===
In 2008, Ofarim had a guest role in an episode of the children's television series Ein Fall für B.A.R.Z.. The same year, he formed another rock band, Acht, along with Oswin Ottl, Petros Kontos, and Andy Lind. Their debut album, Stell dir vor, entirely recorded in German and released in 2010, reflected a new domestic-marketing approach. The quartet supported American singer Alex Band throughout his European concert tour. Also in 2020, Ofarim had appeared as a guest in the ZDF crime television series Ein starkes Team. In October 2012, Ofarim was a contestant on the second season of The Voice of Germany. Coached by singer Xavier Naidoo, he was eliminated in the season's quarter final. His live performances of The Goo Goo Dolls's "Iris" (1998) and Michael Jackson's "Man in the Mirror" both entered the German Singles Chart and marked his first chart entries in a decade.

In 2013, Ofarim had a recurring role as Mick in the mystery series Armans Geheimnis, produced by and broadcast on Das Erste. In 2017, he took part in the German TV series Let's Dance and became winner with his dance partner Ekaterina Leonova. On 1 August 2019, he was revealed to be the Grasshopper on The Masked Singer where he was placed as runner-up.

== Personal life ==
In 2007, a newly identified species of moth from the Amata genus and found in Mount Hermon in the Golan Heights was named Amata gil after him.

On 15 December 2014, Ofarim married his longtime girlfriend Verena Brock. On 6 March 2015, the couple welcomed their first child, a son named Leonard (Leo) Dean Ofarim. On 30 January 2017, the couple welcomed their second child, a daughter named Anouk Marie Ofarim.

Ofarim and Brock divorced in 2017. Ofarim married again in 2025.

== Star of David libel case ==
In October 2021, Ofarim attracted international attention through a video he posted on Instagram and titled “Antisemitismus in Deutschland 2021” (Antisemitism in Germany 2021), in which he accused the Leipzig Westin hotel of subjecting him to antisemitic treatment while checking in. Ofarim claimed in apparent distress that a manager had told him to put away his Star of David pendant, or he would not be allowed to check in. His Instagram video was shared widely, including by the American Jewish Congress, which started an online petition calling on the hotel owner, Marriott, to apologize and educate its employees about antisemitism. On October 5, about 600 people gathered at the hotel to protest antisemitism.

Later, two hotel employees and three guests contradicted the statements by Ofarim, and closed-circuit television recordings showed that Ofarim had not worn a visible necklace during the supposed incident. Confronted with the footage, Ofarim claimed that the exclamation had come from behind, and the incident was not about the necklace but "about something far bigger", as he said he often wore the pendant on television and had been recognised. Ofarim also claimed the hotel had not released the whole footage. Five witnesses said in a police investigation that Ofarim had used swearwords against the hotel while in the lobby and threatened to "post an Instagram video that will go viral".

In March 2022, the German Public Prosecutor's Office discontinued proceedings against the hotel manager, and brought charges against Ofarim for libel and false suspicion.

During the trial, witnesses testified that the hotel's booking system had malfunctioned that day, so guests had to wait to be manually checked in, except regular guests whose cards were already prepared. Ofarim was angry that other guests were checked in before him; after a 20-minute wait, he complained indignantly and threatened to use his social media audience to insult the hotel to the world. In response, the manager decided Ofarim could not check in unless he apologised, after which Ofarim left the hotel and recorded the video falsely accusing the hotel of antisemitism. The hotel manager testified that the false accusations against him had led to death threats, and that he and his partner had to be taken to a secure location.

On November 28, 2023, on the 6th day of the trial, Ofarim confessed that he had fabricated the allegations against the hotel manager and apologized to him; the hotel manager accepted Ofarim's apology. The proceedings against Ofarim were discontinued on the condition that he pay 5,000 euros each to the Jewish Community of Leipzig and the House of the Wannsee Conference, a memorial and educational center (10,000 euros in total). Ofarim also had to pay an undisclosed sum to the manager as compensation. The court justified the discontinuation of the trial by explaining that the hotel manager had been vindicated more effectively by Ofarim's apology than would have been possible through a verdict.

== Discography ==
=== Studio albums ===
Title	Album details	Peak positions		
Title	Album details	GER	AUT	SWI
Here I Am	Released: 25 May 1998; Label: RCA Local; Formats: CD	20	47	34
The Album	Released: 2 May 2000; Label: Ariola; Formats: CD	—	—	—
On My Own	Released: 26 May 2003; Label: Neotone; Formats: CD, digital download	—	—	—
Alles auf Hoffnung	Released: 28 February 2020; Label: We Love Music; Formats: CD, digital download	5	71	41

=== Singles ===
- "Round 'n' Round (It Goes)" (1997)
- "Never Giving Up Now" (1998)
- "If You Only Knew" (featuring the Moffatts) (1998)
- "Here I Am" (1998)
- "Let the Music Heal Your Soul" (with various artists) (1998)
- "Talk to You" (1998)
- "Calling" (1998) (featuring Karylle)
- "Walking Down the Line" (1999)
- "Out of My Bed (Still in My Head)" (1999)
- "It's Your Love" (2000)
- "The Reason" (2003)
- "She" (2003, not released)
- "In Your Eyes" (2004)
- "I'm Alive" (Zoo Army) (2006)
- "Still" (Acht) (2010)

== Participation in TV shows in Germany ==
- 2017: Let’s Dance (RTL, winner)
- 2018: Schlag den Star (ProSieben, winner)
- 2019: Das große Promibacken (Sat.1, participant)
- 2019: The Masked Singer (ProSieben, participant)
- 2020: Die! Herz! Schlag! Show! (ProSieben, participant)
- 2026: Ich bin ein Star – Holt mich hier raus! (RTL, winner)
