= Without You (Sqeezer song) =

Single by Sqeezer

from the album Streetlife
- Released: 6 April 1998 (Europe)
- Recorded: 1997
- Genre: Euro pop; euro house; downtempo; freestyle
- Length: 3:39
- Label: Akropolis; EMI Electrola
- Songwriter(s): N-Dee; Lio
- Producer(s): N-Dee; Lio

Sqeezer singles chronology
"Get It Right" (1997)	"Without You" (1998)

"Without You" is a song by German-based dance-pop group Sqeezer. It was released in Europe on 6 April 1998 as the sixth single and third song from their second studio album Streetlife (1998). All CD singles were manufactured in Holland and then Distributed by Cologne Dance Label and EMI Records before being discontinued sometime in 1998.

== Track listing ==
Europe CD-maxi

1. "Without You" (Radio Video Single) – 3:39
2. "Without You" (Mellow Guitar Vers.) – 3:39
3. "Without You" (Extended Mix) – 5:11
4. "Without You" (Groove Mood Mix) – 5:47
5. "Boom Boom" – 2:25

Europe (Fan Edition, Enhanced)

1. "Without You" (Radio Video Single) – 3:39
2. "Without You" (US-Groove Remix) – 5:12
3. "Without You" (House Remix) – 7:23
4. "Without You" (Bonus Mix) – 4:04
5. "Without You" (Mellow Guitar Vers.) – 3:39
- Special edition Bonus videos
1. "Without You" – 3:35

Germany (Limited VIP Edition, Promo)

1. "Without You" (Radio Video Single) – 3:39
2. "Without You" (Mellow Guitar Vers.) – 3:39
3. "Without You" (Extended Mix) – 5:11
4. "Without You" (Groovy Mood Mix) – 5:47

== Charts ==
=== Weekly charts ===
Chart (1998)	Peak position
Austria (Ö3 Austria Top 40)	10
Germany (GfK)	10
Switzerland (Schweizer Hitparade)	12

=== Year-end charts ===
Chart (1998)	Position
Austria (Ö3 Austria Top 40)	38
Germany (Official German Charts)	75
Switzerland (Schweizer Hitparade)	44
