= Scandy Randy =

Single by Sqeezer

from the album Drop Your Pants
- Released: 4 December 1995
- Recorded: 1995
- Genre: Euro House, House, Deep House
- Length: 3:37
- Label: Cologne Dance Label, Akropolis
- Songwriter(s): Bermann Brothers
- Producer(s): Jim Reeves

Sqeezer singles chronology
"Scandy Randy" (1995)	"Blue Jeans" (1996)

"Scandy Randy" is a song by German dance-pop group Sqeezer. It was released in December 1995 as the first single and twelfth song from their album, Drop Your Pants. It peaked at number 39 in Germany. The song did not achieve widespread distribution or airplay outside of that region, unlike the subsequent hit singles from Drop Your Pants. The female model for the music video was the dancer, TV host, and singer, Yvonne Spath, but the real studio singer for the songs by Sqeezer was Alexandra Prince.

== Track listing ==
CD-Maxi

1. "Scandy Randy" (Radio/Video Version) – 3:37
2. "Scandy Randy" (Dance Radio Version) – 3:53
3. "Scandy Randy" (McCoy Mix) – 4:55
4. "Scandy Randy" (Wicked Speed House Mix) – 5:06
5. "Scandy Randy" (Handyman Mix) – 5:07
6. "Scandy Randy" (Mobil House Mix) – 6:10

== Charts ==
Chart (1996)	Peak position
Germany (Offizielle Top 100)	39
