= Same Same =

Canadian pop duo

- Origin: Tumbler Ridge, British Columbia, Canada
- Genres: Pop, pop rock
- Years active: 2006
- Spinoff of: The Moffatts
- Past members: Clint Moffatt; Bob Moffatt

Same Same was a pop duo consisting of identical twins Bob and Clint Moffatt, originally members of the Canadian boy band the Moffatts. Same Same was based in Thailand and they sold albums and performed mainly in Thailand, Indonesia, Malaysia, and the Philippines.

== Background ==
On March 26, 2006, Same Same released their first album The Meaning of Happy, and in the summer of 2006 started an international tour throughout Thailand, Indonesia and the Philippines.

For The Meaning of Happy, they collaborated with Thai producer Warut Rintranukul and with several Asian artists, such as Arpaporn Nakornsawan and Nui of the Peachband, Lovi Poe, Audy, Jaclyn Victor, and duo Michelle & Vickie. For their music videos, they worked with Thai director Nonthee Nimitbut. They hosted the MTV Asia Awards primer Road to Bangkok and were also presenters for the said awards. Same Same also sang for the World Cup 2006 album entitled Voices from the FIFA World Cup, on the songs "Give It All You Got" (with Arpaporn Nakornsawan) and "Believe in Your Dream" with the Sony BMG All-Stars (Thailand).

In September 2006, Same Same decided to take a hiatus. In January 2007, the band announced that they would be holding a contest for fans to choose a new band name for them. Their fansite, Same Same Music, shut down the following month. In 2011, Bob and Clint Moffatt resided in Nashville, Tennessee. They had been writing songs and briefly worked on material for a country album performing under the name Two Bullet Parade, but later changed their name to Like Strangers. They performed in venues around the Nashville metropolitan area. In 2016, Clint and Bob released their new EP under the name Endless Summer, with the debut single "Amen for Women". They later changed their name to Music Travel Love.

== Discography ==
- The Meaning of Happy (2006)

== See also ==
- Scott Moffatt
- Dave Moffatt
