= Saturday Night (Sqeezer song) =

Single by Sqeezer

from the album Drop Your Pants
- Released: 29 January 1997; 1997 (Spain)
- Recorded: 1996
- Genre: Europop; Eurohouse
- Length: 3:52
- Label: Cologne Dance Label
- Songwriter: Berman Brothers
- Producers: Jim Reeves; N-Dee; Frank Lio

Sqeezer singles chronology
| "Sweet Kisses" (1996) | "Saturday Night" (1997) | "Tamagotchi (Tschoopapa ...)" (1997) |

"Saturday Night" is a song by German dance-pop group Sqeezer, not to be confused with Whigfield's No.1 hit "Saturday Night". It was released on 29 January 1997 as the fourth single released from their debut album, Drop Your Pants (1996). The song charted in Germany, reaching at number 43 on the Offizielle Top 100. In Spain, it was certified gold by PROMUSICAE, peaking at number five on the Spanish maxi-singles chart. The song also reached number five in Czech Republic.

== Track listing ==
- CD-maxi
1. "Saturday Night" (Radio-/Video-Single) – 3:52
2. "Saturday Night" (Party-Single) – 3:56
3. "Saturday Night" (Extended Video-Version) – 5:25
4. "Saturday Night" (Set-A-Day-Night-House-Mix) – 5:06
5. "Tic Tac" – 1:35

== Charts ==
=== Weekly charts ===
| Chart (1997) | Peak position |
|---|---|
| Czech Republic (IFPI CR) | 5 |
| Germany (GfK) | 43 |

=== Year-end charts ===
| Chart (1997) | Position |
|---|---|
| Germany (Offizielle Top 100) | 75 |
