= Tamagotchi (Tschoopapa...) =

- German CD cover

Single by Sqeezer
- B-side: "Remember Summertime Baby"
- Released: 1 September 1997
- Genre: Bubblegum dance
- Length: 3:53
- Label: Cologne Dance Label; EMI
- Songwriters: Bermann Brothers; David Jost
- Producers: Jim Reeves; N-Dee; Frank Lio; Dave Dunhill; Mick Dash

Sqeezer singles chronology
"Saturday Night" (1997)	"Tamagotchi (Tschoopapa...)" (1997)	"Get It Right" (1997)

Music video
- "Tamagotchi (Tschoopapa...)" on YouTube

"Tamagotchi (Tschoopapa...)", or "Tamagotchi (Tschoopapa...): The Official Tamagotchi Song!", was first released in Germany in September 1997 as the fifth single (which was not featured in the album). It was an exclusive cooperation between Sqeezer and the Saban Worldwide company. The Special Fan Edition of the Tamagotchi song was released in Europe in December 1997 under EMI. The song was promoted through airplay on several radio stations, as well as a performance on the German VIVA television program Interaktiv in October 1997. The official video of Tamagotchi was filmed in London in the UK.

== Track listing ==
Germany CD-maxi

1. "Tamagotchi (Tschoopapa...)" (Video/Radio Version) – 3:53
2. "Tamagotchi (Tschoopapa...)" (Extended Mix) – 5:16
3. "Tamagotchi (Tschoopapa...)" (Cyberpet Mix) – 4:58
4. "Remember Summertime Baby" – 4:15

Europe (Special Fan Edition) CD-maxi

1. "Tamagotchi (Tschoopapa...)" (Radio/Video Version) – 3:53
2. "Tamagotchi (Tschoopapa...)" (Christmas Tamagotchi) – 4:02
3. "Tamagotchi (Tschoopapa...)" (Karaoke Version) – 3:52
- Special edition Bonus videos
1. "Multimedia Part"

== Charts ==
=== Weekly charts ===
Chart (1997)	Peak position
Germany (GfK)	55
