= Funky Diamonds =

German Girls Band of Dance-pop, R&B

- Origin: Germany
- Genres: Dance-pop, R&B
- Years active: March 1996– December 1999
- Label: Sony BMG/Ariola
- Past members: Simone "Mo" Peter; Diethilde "Dee Dee" Gomes Weinschrott; Yvonne "Y" Spath; Indra Zimmermann; Kira Lingenberg; Sibel Dugan

Funky Diamonds was a German based girl group. They released two albums; their self-titled debut was released in 1997 and their second one was Diamonds Are Forever. They disbanded in 1999. The group's debut album, Funky Diamonds, was certified gold in Japan for 100,000 copies shipped.

== Discography ==
=== Albums ===
- Funky Diamonds (1997)
- Diamonds Are Forever (1999)

=== Singles ===
- Bad Girls (1996)
- I Know That You Want Me (1997)
- It's My Game (1997)
- Get It On (1997)
- It's All About You (1998, Promo Single)
- Get Funky Go Sista (1998)
- Night Fever (1998, released only in Japan)
- I Wanna Have… (1999)
- + Go Hand in Hand for Christmas Day (1997, charity single together with Sista Sista / Bed & Breakfast / 3Deep / Lorenza / Joy, Sugar & Cream / Michael Evans / Amex Love / R&B)
- + The Day Before Christmas (exklusiv 1997 auf dem Charity-Album "Go Hand in Hand for Christmas Day" erschienen so wie als B-Track der japanischen Single-Version von "Get it on"
