= The Moffatts =

Canadian family music group

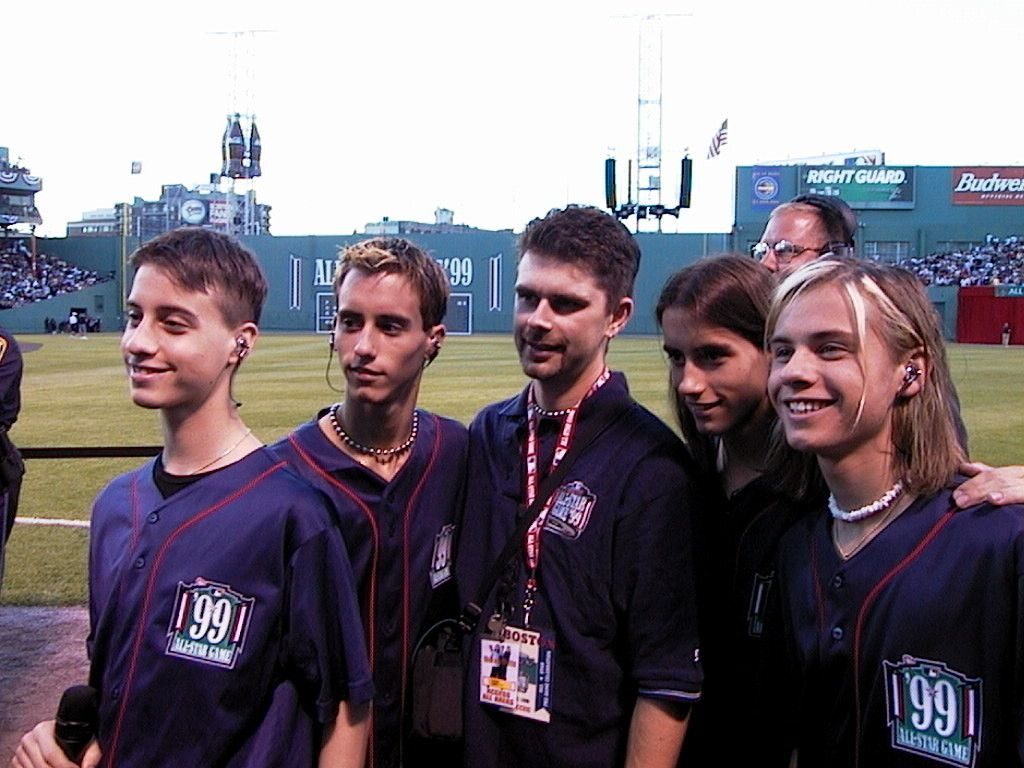
- The Moffatts in 1999

Background information
- Origin: Tumbler Ridge, British Columbia, Canada
- Genres: Pop, country, pop rock, alternative rock
- Years active: 1987–2001, 2003, 2012, 2016–present
- Labels: MCA Music, Polydor, EMI
- Members: Scott Moffatt; Clint Moffatt; Bob Moffatt; Dave Moffatt

The Moffatts are a Canadian pop/rock country band composed of brothers Scott, Clint, Bob, and Dave Moffatt. Scott was born on March 30, 1983, in Whitehorse, Yukon, and triplets Bob, Clint, and Dave were born 11 months later in Vancouver, British Columbia, on March 8, 1984. Bob and Clint are identical twins, while Dave is a fraternal triplet.

The band began as a country music vocal group during their childhood and released three records under Polydor Nashville: It's a Wonderful World (1993), The Moffatts (1995), and A Moffatt Christmas (1996). At the time, it was said that they were the youngest band to ever sign a major label recording contract. They released their first pop album Chapter I: A New Beginning (1998). They released one more album Submodalities in 2000 before disbanding in 2001. The band reunited for a one-off online Christmas show on December 22, 2012, on Stageit. In February 2017, Scott, Bob and Clint Moffatt embarked on an extensive promotional tour in Asia for The Moffatts Farewell Tour before being rejoined by Dave in 2018 for the second leg of the Reunion Tour.

Bob and Clint have formed a duo called Music Travel Love.

== Members ==
- Scott Andrew Moffatt: lead vocals, guitars
- Clinton Thomas John "Clint" Moffatt: backing vocals, bass, percussion
- Robert Franklin Peter "Bob" Moffatt: backing vocals, drums, congas
- David Michael William "Dave" Moffatt: lead vocals, keyboards

== Musical career ==
=== 1987–1997: Early years and country albums ===
The Moffatts consists of Scott Moffatt and his brothers Bob, Clint, and Dave, who are triplets.

Growing up in Faro, Yukon, Tumbler Ridge and later Victoria, British Columbia, Canada, the Moffatts learned to sing early in their lives. Their first recording was at Studio 86 in West Edmonton Mall, where they sang the song "Grandpa" by the Judds in 1987. They began singing country music with their mother, Darlana and father, Frank Moffatt. The boys first appearing on-stage in 1988 at the Timmy's Springtime Telethon. In 1992, after performing at a number of large-scale country music festivals, the group was nominated for five awards by the British Columbia Country Music Association.

In 1992, the Moffatt family moved to Branson, Missouri, where they performed with The Osmonds at the Osmonds Family Theatre. In March 1993, they moved to Nashville, Tennessee, where they became regulars on TNN's Nashville Now with Ralph Emery. In October, they joined the cast of the Country Tonite Show at the Aladdin Hotel in Las Vegas. In 1994, Country Tonite opened a new theatre in Branson and the Moffatts became a part of that cast. In 1995, they appeared on Good Morning America and performed "Guns of Love". In 1996, their parents divorced and they lived primarily with their father, who also managed the group until their 2001 break up.

=== 1998–2000: Chapter I: A New Beginning and Submodalities ===
In their teens, the group dropped out of the country music genre and recorded a new album, Chapter I: A New Beginning, and began singing pop/rock music. Prior to their teenage years the band would only sparingly perform their own instruments and had a back-up band, but now chose to do it alone with Scott on lead guitar, Clint on bass guitar, Dave on keyboards, and Bob on drums. Lead vocals on the album were shared between Scott and Dave, however live they all took their turns. Chapter One sold more than six million copies worldwide and went double platinum in their native Canada. Many industry insiders say that the band sold that many again on the black market in Asia. Chapter One was also very popular in Europe. It was produced in part by the Berman Brothers (who also worked for Hanson and Real McCoy) in New York City and Toronto. The Ottawa-based radio station Hot 89.9 declared them the best new band of 1998.

One single on the US version of Chapter One, the Glen Ballard-produced "Until You Loved Me", appeared in the Drew Barrymore film, Never Been Kissed. "Misery", on the US version of Chapter I: A New Beginning is on the soundtrack of the movie Teaching Mrs. Tingle starring Katie Holmes. In 1999, the band appeared on the NBC television show Hang Time, performing the song "Girl of My Dreams" for the school. In the same year, The Moffatts also did an episode of TV show Campbell Scramble, a show that Calgary's CTV sports newscaster Glenn Campbell made featuring his three daughters Kate, Maddy, and Amy Campbell. That year, the band performed at the Juno Awards show in Hamilton.

In 2000, they appeared on the Disney Channel show So Weird in the episode "Destiny". The Moffatts also appeared frequently on The Sally Jessy Raphael Show and The Maury Povich Show. During their stay in Köln, Germany, The Moffatts met a young German guitar player, and German teen idol Gil Ofarim and co-wrote with him what was to be his breakout first single, "If You Only Knew". The Moffatts sang "O Canada" at the 1999 Major League Baseball All-Star Game. In 1999, The Moffatts were awarded Fan Favourite Band of the Year at the iHeartRadio Much Music Video Awards.

The follow-up album Submodalities was released in October 2000, and contained a more classic/harder-edged rock flavor than typical "boy band" fare. The transition between the bubblegum pop of their prior album and the harder edge of the new was captured in the 2001 documentary, The Moffatts: Closing of Chapter One. The Moffatts wrote or co-wrote almost all of the songs on the album. Bob Rock, who has produced albums for such superstars as Metallica and Bon Jovi, produced Submodalities. The album was also certified platinum by the CRIA for selling over 100,000 copies. The first single, "Bang Bang Boom" at that time was the fastest rising single to No. 1 in Canadian music history and topped the retail singles chart in Canada. The Moffatts sang "O Canada" at the 2000 NBA All-Star Game. The Moffatts hosted the Juno Awards of 2000.

From 1998 to 2000, The Moffatts were one of the biggest selling act in South East Asia. The band stayed at the top of the charts in the Philippines, Thailand, Taiwan, Malaysia, and Indonesia throughout this period of time. They also completed a couple of firsts – the band shared the stage with Aqua for the first ever paid concert by an international artist in Shanghai, China, and the first ever out door stadium show in Ho Chi Minh City, Vietnam. At the time The Moffatts were the biggest selling international band of all time in the Philippines, a title they will likely never relinquish as sales will possibly never return to a high.

=== 2001–2011: Breakup and post-breakup ventures ===
On August 25, 2001, the group broke up following their concert in London, Ontario. Thirteen years of touring, over 5,000 concerts, different tastes in music, and the fact that they were all now 18 years of age weighed heavy on their decisions to go their own way.

After the break-up, Bob and Clint Moffatt briefly joined a group called Pusch and performed at the 2002 Winter Olympics. The band was later renamed Hidell, and lasted slightly over a year and released one album, which featured the single "Going Down In Flames". On September 27, 2003, the band reunited to perform at the "Fire On The Mountain" benefit concert in Kamloops. In 2004, the Canadian Pacific Railway announced in a press release that Bob and Clint were "reunited" and appeared under the name "The Moffatts" for the railway's Holiday Train program, a mobile fundraiser for community food banks. In 2005, Scott also joined the tour.

Bob eventually relocated to Ban Phe, Thailand, where he began working on an English singing contest with an educational organization called TEFL International. Bob convinced Clint to join him in Thailand and start a band called Same Same under the Sony BMG Music Entertainment label in 2006. As of 2011, Bob and Clint Moffatt reside in Nashville, Tennessee. They had been writing songs and performing under the name Two Bullet Parade, but later changed their name to Like Strangers. They performed in venues around the Nashville metropolitan area. In 2016, Clint and Bob released their new EP under the name Endless Summer, with the debut single "Amen For Women".

Scott Moffatt resurfaced in an Ontario-based band The Boston Post, named after the newspaper. The original lineup included Shawn Everett on drums, Jon Gant on guitar, and Neal Gupta on bass. They released an EP titled It's 99PM in 2003. A video interview with Scott Moffatt from the Holiday Train show in Sparwood, British Columbia on December 13, 2005 indicated that he planned to go solo and was recording in Los Angeles. On April 10, 2006, song previews from the upcoming independent release The Allegory of the City were put up on his music page along with the promise of a limited-edition version soon being available for pre order. Scott has been credited as the producer that opened the door for Thailand's biggest rock band Slot Machine.

Dave Moffatt eventually relocated to Winnipeg, Manitoba, Canada, at first with aspirations of attending the University of Winnipeg and then deciding to launch an acting and modeling career. Dave appeared in a 2005 Winnipeg production of Miss Saigon and was a contestant on Canadian Idol, making it into the top 32 before being eliminated.

=== 2012: Reunion ===
Beginning November 2012, The Moffatts were featured in LG's online campaign, "Life's Good". The campaign features their song "Bang Bang Boom" with altered composition and lyrics.

The Moffatts reunited for the first time in over ten years for an online Christmas show on Stageit on December 22, 2012. The set list included Christmas carols and songs picked by fans from the entire Moffatts' catalog, including solo records and Like Strangers/Same Same.

=== 2016–2017: The Farewell Tour ===
On October 30, 2016, Bob and Clint Moffatt announced on their Facebook page that they would be reuniting once again for a one-time concert with Scott Moffatt as The Moffatts sans Dave Moffatt, and would be returning to Manila for the first time in 16 years as part of a farewell tour.

In February 2017, Scott, Bob, and Clint Moffatt embarked on an extensive promotional tour in the Philippines, Indonesia, and Singapore for The Moffatts Farewell Tour. On February 18, 2017, they performed at the Araneta Coliseum, approximately 19 years after their first concert in the Philippines at the same venue. They sang songs from their past albums, Chapter I: A New Beginning, Tour Souvenir Package, Submodalities, and Same Same's The Meaning of Happy, and current projects such as Endless Summer.

Scott Moffatt has recorded a solo EP in Montreal, Quebec, Canada, and has produced an album for country music singer Luke Combs. While Bob and Clint Moffatt are staying in Nashville, Tennessee, as the country duo Music Travel Love. Dave Moffatt was a yoga instructor in Toronto, Ontario, Canada, and came back from retirement by holding his own farewell tour concert in Manila, Philippines on May 27, 2017.

=== 2018–present: Chapter II ===
In November 2017, it was announced on the band's Facebook page that a new single has been recorded by The Moffatts called "Secrets". The group has also signed a record deal with Bec-Tero Music, Thailand. The song "Secrets" was released worldwide on January 10, 2018. Two further singles, "Like I Love U" and "So In Love" were released during 2018. The band also played live for the first time in 2 years on 'The Reunion Tour 2018'.

A 6 track EP Chapter II was released in November 2018.

== Music Travel Love ==
Bob and Clint have formed a duo called Music Travel Love. They record and perform cover songs at scenic locations around the world. In addition, they have started a children's channel (Music Travel Kids), and a coffee company called Music Java Love. Dave is teaching yoga while at the same time active on his social media accounts also making covers, and Scott produced Country Music Superstar Luke Combs' first two records.

== Discography ==
=== Studio albums ===
Title	Details	Peak chart positions					Certifications (sales thresholds)
Title	Details	CAN	US	US Country	US Heat	UK	Certifications (sales thresholds)
It's a Wonderful World	Release date: June 20, 1995; Label: Mercury Records/PolyGram	—	—	—	—	—	
The Moffatts	Release date: October 1995; Label: Polydor Nashville	—	—	44	13	—	
A Moffatts' Christmas	Release date: 1996; Label: self-released	—	—	—	—	—	
Chapter I: A New Beginning	Release date: May 18, 1998; Label: Capitol Records/EMI	49	124	—	3	62	CAN: Platinum
Submodalities	Release date: October 2, 2000; Label: Capitol Records/EMI	8	—	—	—	—	CAN: Platinum
"—" denotes releases that did not chart

=== EPs ===
Title	Album details
Chapter II	Released: November 9, 2018; Label: BEC-TERO; Format: CD, digital download, streaming

=== Compilations ===
Title	Album details
Best of The Moffatts	Released: June 19, 2006; Label: Capitol Records/EMI; Format: CD, digital download

=== Singles ===
Year	Single	Peak chart positions							Album
Year	Single	AUT	CAN	CAN AC	GER	SUI	SWE	UK	Album
1995	"I Think She Likes Me"	—	—	—	—	—	—	—	The Moffatts
1995	"Caterpillar Crawl"	—	—	—	—	—	—	—	The Moffatts
1995	"Guns of Love"	—	—	—	—	—	—	—	The Moffatts
1998	"I'll Be There for You"	24	5	25	41	21	34	—	Chapter I: A New Beginning
1998	"Miss You Like Crazy"	19	23	9	25	13	15	—	Chapter I: A New Beginning
1998	"If Life Is So Short"	—	—	—	—	—	—	—	Chapter I: A New Beginning
1999	"Girl of My Dreams"	—	19	4	—	—	—	—	Chapter I: A New Beginning
1999	"Crazy"	—	—	—	65	—	—	16	Chapter I: A New Beginning
1999	"Until You Loved Me"	—	23	57	—	—	—	36	Chapter I: A New Beginning
1999	"Misery"	—	18	23	—	—	—	47	Chapter I: A New Beginning
2000	"Bang Bang Boom"	—	1	21	71	—	—	—	Submodalities
2000	"Just Another Phase"	—	9	—	—	—	—	—	Submodalities
2001	"Walking Behind"	—	11	—	—	—	—	—	Submodalities
2018	"Secrets"	—	—	—	—	—	—	—	Chapter II
2018	"Like I Love U"	—	—	—	—	—	—	—	Chapter II
2018	"So in Love"	—	—	—	—	—	—	—	Chapter II
"—" denotes releases that did not chart

=== Other charted songs ===
Year	Single	Album
2018	"Say'n I Love U"	Chapter II

=== Music videos ===
Year	Video	Director
1995	"I Think She Likes Me"	Jeffrey C. Phillips
1995	"Caterpillar Crawl"	Michael Merriman
1995	"Guns of Love"	Marc Ball
1998	"I'll Be There for You"	Lionel C. Martin
1998	"Miss You Like Crazy"	David Hogan
1998	"If Life Is So Short"	Steven Goldmann
1999	"Girl of My Dreams"	Paul Hunter
1999	"Crazy"	Richard Murray
1999	"Until You Loved Me"	Michael Salomon
1999	"Misery"	John Scarpati
2000	"Bang Bang Boom"	Trey Fanjoy
2000	"Just Another Phase"	Thom Oliphant
2002	"Who Do You Love"	Brent Hedgecock
2018	"Secrets" (lyric video)	Mike Garces
2018	"Like I Love U"	Mike Garces
2018	"So in Love"	Scott Moffatt

=== B - Sides (2000) ===
- "All The Answers (live recorded)" – 6:48
- "Destiny (live recorded - Psychedelic Version)" – 9:11
- "Hallucinating (live recorded)" – 4:18
- "In My Dreams (live recorded)" – 3:30
- "Kill The Seagulls a.k.a. Submodalities" – 2:33
- "Two Beats (live recorded)" – 3:30
- "Why (live recorded - Reggae Version)" – 5:00

=== B - Sides 90s ===
- "All I Need Is You" – 4:35
- "Christmas Eve" – 3:16
- "Destiny (Acoustic Version)" – 4:13
- "Frustration (live recorded)" – 3:20
- "Girls Of The World" – 2:53
- "Lara (My Love)" – 4:11
- "Santa Claus Is Coming To Town" – 2:45
- "She Said" – 3:45
- "Why (Acoustic Version)" – 4:11
- "YaYa (Rock Version)" – 4:11

=== Demo Songs 90s ===
- "Baby Come Back To Me" (live recorded - Demo) – 3:53
- "Believe In Your Dreams" (live recorded - Demo) – 3:31
- "Flea" (live recorded - Demo) – 3:25
- "One More Chance" (live recorded - Demo) – 3:52
- "See The Light" (live recorded - Demo) – 3:34
- "Tough Boy" (live recorded - Demo) – 3:39
- "Turn It Up" (live recorded - Demo) – 3:38

=== With Other Artists 90s ===
- "If You Only Knew (featuring Gil Ofarim)" – 4:08
- "Let The Music Heal Your Soul (featuring Bravo All Stars)" – 3:55
- "Together (featuring Artists Together for Kosovo)" – 3:37

=== Unreleased Songs (live) ===
- "All I Need Is You (Rock Version)" – xx:xx
- "All The Love" – xx:xx
- "Billy & Tammy (a.k.a. Feels So Good)" – xx:xx
- "Brightest Star" – xx:xx
- "Heal The Pain" – xx:xx
- "How Does It Feel" – 03:25
- "I Feel Alive" – 03:50
- "Love You More" – 04:25
- "There's The Door" – xx:xx
- "When The Morning Comes" – xx:xx
- "Where Did She Go" – xx:xx
- "You Blew Me Over (live in Cologne Germany, 2000)" – 3:12
- "You Make Me Feel (live in Cologne Germany, 2000)" – 4:18

=== Cover Songs (live) ===
- "Fly Away (Lenny Kravitz Cover)" – xx:xx
- "She Loves You (Beatles Cover)" – xx:xx
- "Shine (Collective Soul Cover)" – xx:xx
- "Song 2 (Blur Cover)" – xx:xx
- "Won't Back Down (Tom Petty Cover)" – xx:xx

=== DVDs ===
Title	Video details
Chapter I: A New Beginning LIVE	Released: 1998; Label: Capitol Records/EMI
The Closing of Chapter One	Released: 2001; Label: Capitol Records/EMI

Notes

- A "Just Another Phase" was still climbing the RPM charts when the magazine ceased publication.
