= The Boyz (German band) =

German boy band

- Genres: R&B, pop, hip hop
- Years active: 1996–1999
- Past members: Florian Fischer ('Flow'); Adel Tawil ('Kane'); Tarek Hussein ('T-Soul'); Salvatore Di Blasi; Stephane Claudio Kroll-Marongiu

The Boyz was a German boy band formed in Berlin in 1996 with encouragement from music producer Triple-M. Their biggest success was in 1998 when their single "One Minute" made it to the top-10 both in Germany (No. 9) and Switzerland (No. 8). The single eventually reached the gold status in Germany selling over 250,000 units.

== Career ==
Florian Fischer and Adel Tawil got acquainted through the club scene in Berlin in 1993. Tawil convinced Tarek Hussein and in 1995 the trio got the attention of Triple M-Management during a talent competition. Saxophonist, Salvatore Di Blasi, joined the group through the same competition. The fifth member, Stephane Claudio Kroll-Marongiu, was a Berlin resident and a model was last to join.

In the spring 1997 the band had its break with a Top 30 German hit "Round and Round", their first release from their debut album Boyz in da House. It was followed by another relative success "Let Me Show You the Way". With the third single "One Minute" they reached the Top 10 in both Germany and Switzerland. The band split after four more singles and a second album Next Level.

In February 1998, the band appeared in a German TV series Geliebte Schwestern. 'Flow' (Florian Fischer) had fallen in the December 1997 off the stage suffering a knee injury. This was depicted in the actual scenario of the series and was played by the band members.

== Members ==
- Florian Fischer (as 'Flow') (born 13 October 1974)
- Adel Tawil (as 'Kane') (born 15 August 1978)
- Tarek Hussein (as T-Soul) (born 3 July 1978)
- Salvatore Di Blasi (born 27 October 1980)
- Stephane Claudio Kroll-Marongiu (born 8 March 1979)
- Philipp Rosskamp (born 22. June 1979) (left the band before the main success)

== After the split ==
- Adel Tawil went solo in addition to songwriting and producing. He was also member of the famous German duo Ich + Ich alongside Annette Humpe.
- Florian Fischer now works in music management.
- Tarek Hussein is a music producer and now known as Tarééc. He worked with many acts including German rapper Bushido.

== Discography ==
=== Albums ===
Year	Title	Chart Position
Year	Title	GER
1997	Boyz in da House	63
1998	Next Level	—
1999	All the Best and Goodbye	—

=== Singles ===
Year	Title	Chart Position		Album
Year	Title	GER	SWI	Album
1997	"Round and Round"	27	19	Boyz in da House
1997	"Let Me Show You the Way"	44	—	Boyz in da House
1997	"One Minute"	9	8	Boyz in da House
1998	"Shame"	28	24	Next Level
1998	"I Like"	37	—	Next Level
1998	"God Bless"	80	—	Next Level
1999	"Memories"	35	18	Next Level
