= Girl of My Dreams (The Moffatts song) =

Single by The Moffatts

from the album Chapter I: A New Beginning
- Released: January 18, 1999
- Recorded: 1998
- Genre: Pop rock
- Length: 3:39
- Label: EMI
- Songwriter: The Moffatts

The Moffatts singles chronology
"If Life Is So Short" (1998)	"Girl of My Dreams" (1999)	"Crazy" (1999)

"Girl of My Dreams" is a song by Canadian pop rock band The Moffatts. It was released in January 1999 as the third single from their third album, Chapter I: A New Beginning. The song was a hit in Canada, reaching number 19 on Canada's singles chart and peaked at number 4 on the Canadian RPM Adult Contemporary chart. It is unrelated to the 1979 song of the same name by British band Bram Tchaikovsky. The song's lyrics deal with angst following a break-up. Scott Moffatt was the lead vocalist.

== Music video ==
The music video premiered in early 1999. There are two music videos were released for the song: One was a live footage from one of their concerts, and one official version shot in U.K.

== Track listing ==
No.	Title	Length
1.	"Girl of My Dreams" (Tom Lord-Alge Remix)	3:39
2.	"Girl of My Dreams" (live)	3:05
3.	"Over the Rainbow" (Garage Recording)	3:00

== Chart positions ==
Chart (1999)	Peak position
Canadian RPM Top Singles	19
Canadian RPM Adult Contemporary	4
Spain Airplay (Top 40 Radio)	37
