= DOGTV =

Television network for dogs

- DOGTV logo
- Country: United States

Programming
- Picture format: 480i (SDTV); 1080i (HDTV)

History
- Launched: February 13, 2012; 14 years ago

Links
- Webcast: watch.dogtv.com
- Website: www.dogtv.com

Availability

Streaming media
- Apple TV: Streaming TV
- Amazon Fire TV: Streaming TV
- Roku: Streaming TV
- Sling TV: Streaming TV

DOGTV is an American premium cable television network and the first television network that is made specifically for dogs. The network was founded in equal parts by Ron Levi and Guy Martinovsky, its first CEO, that sold his shares later To Jasmine Group. DOGTV provides 24/7 digital TV programming that is designed to provide entertainment for dogs. The programming, created with the help of dog behavior specialists, is color-adjusted to appeal to dogs, and features 3-6 minute segments designed to relax, to stimulate, and to expose the dog to scenes of everyday life such as doorbells or riding in a vehicle. In 2012, San Diego Humane Society in Escondido installed DOGTV for their shelter dogs.

== History ==
The idea for DOGTV came from founder, Ron Levi, and his cat named Charlie. “He just gave me the saddest eyes one day,” Levi said of Charlie when he was leaving the house one day. This prompted Levi to edit videos of squirrels, birds and fish for Charlie to enjoy while he was away.

DOGTV initially launched in Israel. In February 2012, DOGTV launched in a test market in San Diego, California through Cox and Time Warner, where people and dogs were able to experience the channel for free. The successful launch in this test market set the stage for a commercial launch nationwide on DirecTV.

In 2014 Discovery made a strategic investment in DOGTV, and became a minority stake holder in the company.

== Programs ==
DOGTV has three types of programs that cycle throughout the day. Stimulation episodes show dogs playing in a field, graphics accompanied by engaging sounds and visits to the dog park from the dog's perspective. Relaxation episodes play soft music, with calm scenes like animals at a safari, or dogs napping at home. Exposure episodes focus on potential sounds a dog might hear in common environments, such as thunderstorms, vacuum cleaners and fireworks.

== Available markets ==
DOGTV is available in the U.S., Mexico, Brazil, Portugal, South Korea, China, UK, Australia and New Zealand. In the U.S. the channel is available on DirecTV, Dish, Xfinity, Cox, RCN, Sling TV and supported streaming devices.

== Supported devices ==
Supported DOGTV devices include:

=== Streaming media players ===
- Apple TV (4th generation & 4K)
- Amazon Fire TV
- Roku
- Chromecast

=== Smart TVs ===
- Samsung Smart TV (2016 & higher models only)
- Roku Smart TV

=== Game consoles ===
- As of 29 March 2024, DOGTV is no longer supported on any game consoles

=== Mobile ===
- iOS mobile devices (10.x or higher)
- Android mobile devices

=== Computer ===
- macOS
- Windows

== See also ==
- Doggie Adventure — 1989 short film meant to entertain dogs
