= Quentin Elias =

French singer and model

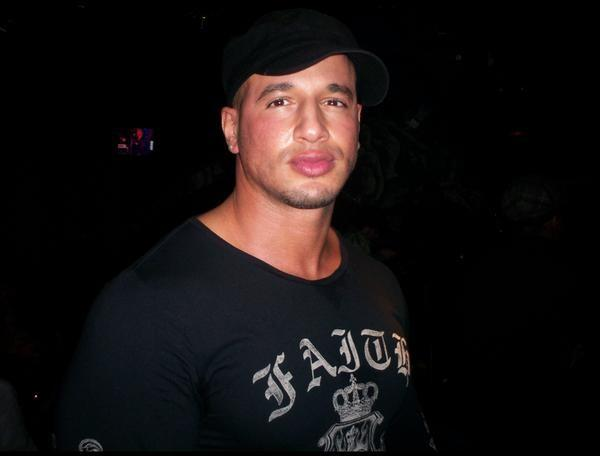
- Quentin Elias (New York, March 2008)

Background information
- Born: 10 May 1974 (other sources report a birth year of 1980); Mende, Lozère, France
- Died: 25 February 2014 (aged 39) Staten Island, New York City, New York, USA
- Genres: Pop, R&B, dance
- Years active: 1996–2014
- Label: Quentin Elias Music Inc.
- Formerly of: Alliage
- Website: www.quentinelias.com

Quentin Elias (10 May 1974 – 25 February 2014) was a French singer, actor and model. Of Algerian heritage, he was the original lead singer of the French boy band Alliage with Steven Gunnell, Roman Lata Ares and Brian Torres from 1996 to 2000. After his departure from the group, he relocated to the United States where he developed a solo singing career singing in English and French, releasing a number of albums, EPs and singles through his company Quentin Elias Music and distribution by Electro Boy Inc Records. He also worked as a model, acted in a number of feature films, television series and on stage and was featured in a number of advertisements. He took part in documentaries notably The Adonis Factor appearing on the documentary's promotional cover. He was active in body training, tattooing, in photography and in active blogging of his progress, all the while releasing more materials online. He was briefly involved in solo adult appearances on the Randy Blue gay male site under the pseudonym Q. He made a comeback in France starting in 2011, appearing in a number of tours, made new releases for the French and European markets, including remakes of earlier Alliage hits and had a number of appearances on popular French reality television shows and on talk and entertainment shows talking candidly about his past. On 25 February 2014, Elias died at his home in New York City.

== Early life ==
Quentin Akacha Elias was born in Mende, Lozère, France (although some sources dispute this and cite Marseille as his place of birth) to Algerian immigrants. He was born to Algerian (father) and Malika Zeggour (mother) and had one sister Nina. After attending some of his sister's dance classes, Elias became interested in performing and was enrolled in classes where he studied tap, ballet and modern jazz. He also participated and competed in kick-boxing. After his father died in a car accident when Quentin was just 18, Elias left home and relocated to Paris, where he worked odd jobs while auditioning for singing and or dancing gigs.

== Career ==
=== Musical career ===
==== Alliage (1996-1999) ====
In 1996, Elias auditioned and was selected as a member of Alliage and became its lead singer. Alliage was composed of Quentin, Steven Gunnell, Roman Lata Ares and Brian Torres and they recorded two albums, Alliage, l'album in 1997 and Musics in 1998.

The group had many singles in France including six singles that charted in the Top 5. The band's most famous singles included "Baïla" in 1996, "Lucy", "Le temps qui court" and "Te garder près de moi" (in collaboration with Boyzone) in 1997 and "Je sais" in 1998. Alliage also toured internationally, having additional success in other countries. However, later releases were lacklustre and Quentin left Alliage in 1999 to pursue a separate solo career. The band split up soon after in 2000, ending a four-year run.

==== Solo career (1999-2014) ====
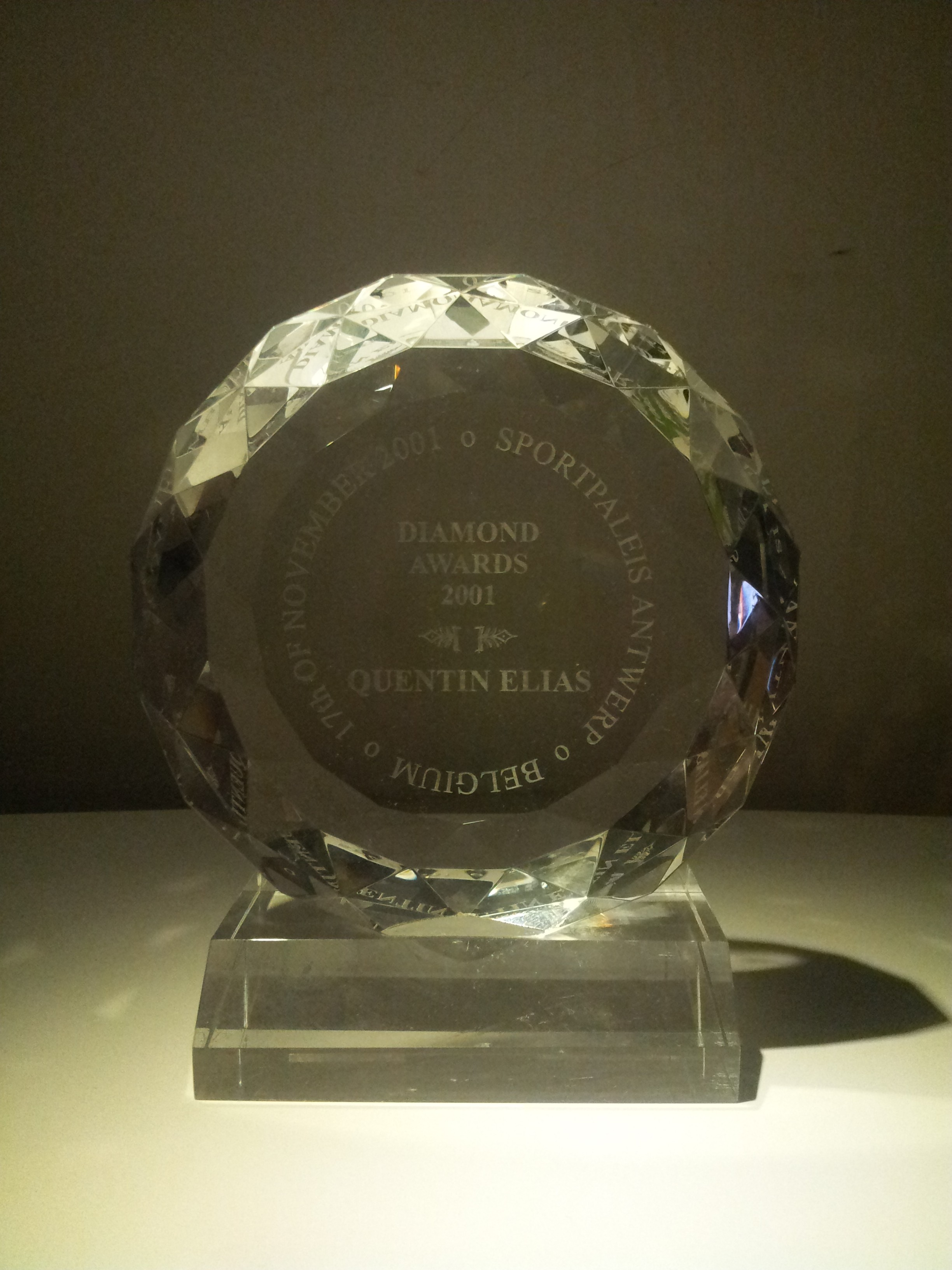
Diamond Awards, Sportpaleis, Antwerp, Belgium (17 November 2001)

Starting from 1999, after having left Alliage, Elias pursued a solo musical career. He tried collaborating with the French producers, the Nacash brothers. Greatly disappointed, he later on worked with Belgian producer Christian Moeyaert. In 2001, he won the European Diamond Award for "Best Male Promising Act" held on 17 November 2001 in Sportpaleis, Antwerp in Belgium. He later relocated to New York City and began working with music producers such as Ernie Lake and Junior Vasquez. Shortly after the 9-11 attacks Elias was introduced to producer Nile Rodgers by publicist Catherine P. Saxton who invited Elias to perform with several celebrities on a charitable single cover of Sister Sledge's "We Are Family" with Rodgers and Spike Lee.

He relocated to New York in 2002 and released the single "Always the Last to Say Goodbye", produced by Christian Moeyaert. He also performed at local gay venues and events such as Splash Bar, and Tom of Finland events.

Besides performing some original songs, Elias has recorded some covers, like Madonna's song "Holiday", and "Shattered Dreams" by British pop group Johnny Hates Jazz. Continuing to perform and record, Elias released a maxi single "Serve It Up" in 2005 and a solo album "What If I?" In September 2005, he started his own corporation Quentin Elias Music, Inc.. After a return to French audiences after years of residing the States, he engaged in a comeback tour in 2011 and 2012, that included dates various European francophone venues under the title "Quentin Elias (Re Invented)" promoting his new release and remakes of old hits. A year later he returned with the Justify 2013 Tour.

=== Acting career ===
Elias appeared in two episodes of the television series Sex Chronicles. He was also one of the featured subjects in the 2010 documentary '"The Adonis Factor" alongside models Clint Catalyst, Anderson Davis, Dakota Rivers, Christopher Saint and writer/actor Bruce Vilanch.

He made his theater debut starring in the role of Joe Kirwood in a production of "The Boulevard", a theater adaptation of the film "Sunset Blvd". The play had a limited run at a West Hollywood theater during the spring of 2010.

In 2010, he played roles of a vampire in the film The Brides of Sodom, followed by small roles in the 2013 low-budget film comedy College Debts. and in He Who Finds a Wife 2: Thou Shall Not Covet. He took on small roles as the cell mate of Bernie Madoff in the 2011 low-budget film Madoff: Made Off with America and in the 2012 thriller Azienda.

==== Television ====
In September 2007, Elias appeared in an episode of MTV's, My Super Sweet 16 hired to perform at a Sweet Sixteen birthday event. He also made a special appearance on an episode of the television series The Things We Do for Love.

French television stations made a number of reports on his progress including the program Incroyables destins under the title "Boy bands: L'argent, la gloire, puis la chute" in 2008, the station TF1 in the series Je realise mon rêve in 2009 and NRJ 12 in the series Tellement Vrai also in 2009

In 2012, he returned to French television through a reality television show L'Île des vérités (meaning the island of truths) in its second season on television station NRJ 12 as a guest musician/model, alongside musician Willy Denzey and television presenter Marlène Mourreau. The candidates Aurélie, Geoffrey, Cindy, Dimitri, Pietro, Samir, Florent, Ines, Léa, Priscilla and Anita are in Tahiti and have the task of organizing a fund raising concert in aid of needy children of the island. Elias and Willy Densey had to perform in the concert. But Elias unexpectedly left the show after clashing with the organizers. Then he had a change of heart and returned in a later episode to take part in the charity event.

His last appearance was on the television reality show Giuseppe Ristorante broadcast on the French station NRJ 12 with the inaugural episode aired on 18 February 2014.

=== Modeling ===
Elias modeled for several fashion designers including; Giorgio Armani, Jean Paul Gaultier, Thierry Mugler and Levi's. Elias also served as a model for Nikos, a manufacturer of gay leather gear based in New York City. He also worked as a model with a number of New York and California-based photographers, notably Carlos Arias, Ulrich Oehmen, Luis Raphael, Mike Ruiz, Michael Stokes, Scott Hoover and others. In 2008 he released his first calendar.

=== Adult video performances ===
In 2008, Elias (using the pseudonym of "Q") appeared on the pornography site "Randy Blue," performing in a solo video directed by Jeremy Lucido. Elias stated, "I have done so much in my career, this adult video is one more thing I have done in my career, it came to me at a point in my life when I felt very sexual and felt the need to express myself through sex." But in several interviews later on, he refused to call his appearance on Randy Blue "pornographic", admitting though that he got remunerated handsomely for his appearance. He declared to Voici magazine: "Randy Blue came and asked me to make a solo video. I'm damn good, they paid me a lot of money for 10 minutes in a video. So I said: 'Why not, I'd be stupid to refuse'!" In a following television interview, he blamed the French media for concentrating on this specific adult appearance while disregarding or selectively ignoring or downplaying most of his work in music, film, theatre and modelling in the States.

== Personal life ==
In order to maintain his physique, Elias exercised regularly, repeatedly declaring he avoided drugs, and denying rumors that he used steroids. He indulged in having a great number of tattoos including his Arabic name Akacha on his arm and the star and crescent to indicate his Algerian origin. He also appeared in a great number of photoshots and video footage and actively kept an online blog and posted a huge amount of footage online about the progress of his career. He also dispelled many rumors that he had cosmetically enhanced his lips, stating that they are natural.

Candidly addressing sexuality issues, when asked in an exclusive interview with Les inRocKs about possible homosexuality of members of various boybands of the time, and was this a taboo subject not to discuss at the height of their success he answered: "I don't know, I am not gay, none of the other Alliage members were gay. Now, I don't know about the sexuality in other bands".

== Death ==
Elias died on February 25, 2014, in his home on Staten Island, New York. The following day, miscellaneous posts on social media networks started circulating news about his death from massive heart failure due to excessive steroid use or human growth hormone. As speculation and confusion grew about the news, and in a bid to put a halt to ever-increasing and at times conflicting news and speculations once and for all, Quentin Elias management had to put a notice his Facebook page later on February 26, that said: "Tomorrow a statement will be made on the announcement of the passing of Quentin Elias. This is a very sad time for his family and fans around the world. Please be patient for the official press release as it will be posted here tomorrow. – MGMT" After the management's release, most French and US media outlets confirmed it in their later news dispatches on February 26 and 27. The family put a note on his Facebook page on February 27, 2014, saying "Quentin Elias passed away at his home in New York on February 25th, 2014. The family would like to thank everyone for supporting Quentin's career as he truly loved to perform for his loving fans."

The funeral services were held in New York City on March 4, 2014. His body was subsequently sent to France where he was buried in Marseille, France. In addition, a permanent memorial page was established to keep his memory. Elias was survived by his mother, Malika Zeggour and sister Nina Boileaux.

== Discography ==
=== Albums ===
(based on Quentin Elias page on iTunes)

Album and details	Notes
What If I?: Year released: 2006; Record label: Quentin Elias Music	No. / Title / Length; 1. / "Always The Last To Say Goodbye (Radio Edit)" / 3:36; 2. / "Can't Stop Thinking Of You (Radio Edit)" / 3:31; 3. / "What If I?" / 4:09; 4. / "So What" / 3:05; 5. / "Serve It Up (Radio Edit)" / 3:45; 6. / "This Time Baby (Radio Edit)" / 3:40; 7. / "J'ai Besoin de Toi" / 3:15; 8. / "Baïla" / 4:33; 9. / "This Time Baby (Junior Vasquez Anthem)" / 10:15; 10. / "Dance With Me (Club Mix)" / 6:35; 11. / "Can't Stop Thinking Of You (NYC Club Mix)" / 6:33; 12. / "Always The Last To Say Goodbye (Junior Vasquez Tribal Dub)" / 5;54; 13. / "Always The Last To Say Goodbye (Junior Vasquez Mix)" / 7:27; 14. / "Always The Last To Say Goodbye (Acoustic Sunrise Mix)" / 3:31
What If I? (Deluxe Version): Year released: 2008; Record label: Electro Boy Inc Records / Quentin Elias Music	No. / Title / Length; 1. / "So What" / 3:06; 2. / "Serve It Up" / 3:45; 3. / "What If I?" / 4:06; 4. / "Always the Last to Say Goodbye" / 3:31; 5. / "Can't Stop Thinking of You" / 3:39; 6. / "This Time Baby" / 3:41; 7. / "J'ai Besoin de Toi" / 3:17; 8. / "Baïla" / 4:35; 9. / "Dance With Me (It's Friday Night) NYC Club Mix" / 6:35; 10. / "Always the Last (NYC Dub Mix)" / 7:09; 11. / "Serve It Up (M&A Spooky Electro Mix)" / 7:18; 12. / "Can't Stop Thinking of You (Nyc Club Mix)" / 6:32; 13. / "This Time Baby (Anthem2 Edit)" / 8:07; 14. / "This Time Baby (Magnum Groove Extended)" / 8:50
Love Confusion: The Singles: Year released: 2010; Record label: Electro Boy Inc Records / Quentin Elias Music	No. / Title / Length; 1. / "Fever (J. Marty's NYC Radio Mix)" / 2:38; 2. / "Kama Sutra (Soft Porn Radio Mix)" / 2:52; 3. / "Shattered Dreams (Original Die For Me Mix)" / 3:48; 4. / "Casanova (Original Playa'z Radio Mix)" / 3:36; 5. / "Take Off (Speakers Blow Radio Mix)" / 3:46; 6. / "I Want Your Love (Original Classic Radio Mix)" / 4:34; 7. / "Always the Last To Say Goodbye (Flash Sanchez Love Confusion Remix) Bonus Track" / 4:58; 8. / "Take Off (Electro Boy Inc's Big Floor Remix) Bonus Track" / 6:12
Quentin Elias: Remixed (remixes by Flash Sanchez featuring Quentin Elias): Year released: 2010; Record label: Electro Boy Inc Records / Quentin Elias Music; Downloads: with Beatport Pro	No. / Title / Length; 1. / "Give Me Some More (Flash's Original Mix)" / 3:06; 2. / "I Want Your Love (Flash's Love Confusion Remix Edit)" / 4:05; 3. / "Take Off (Flash's Shirt's Off Remix Edit)" / 3:31; 4. / "Casanova (Flash's Playa'z Fall In Love Club Edit)" / 3:23; 5. / "Shattered Dreams (Flash's Deep And Dark Remix Edit)" / 3:41; 6. / "I Don't Want A Lover (Previously Unreleased Bonus Track)" / 4:53; 7. / "Always The Last To Say Goodbye (The Re-Invention Bonus Track)" / 2:50

=== EPs ===
Album and details	Notes
Fever (DJ Version) EP: Date released: 14 March 2008; Record label: Quentin Elias Music	No. / Title / Length; 1. / "Fever (J. Marty's NYC Radio Mix)" / 2:37; 2. / "Fever (Flash vs. "Q" Electro Boy Inc Main Event Mix)" / 4:26; 3. / "Fever (Flash & "Q" A Nightflight to Amsterdam Dub Version)" / 4:33
Kama Sutra (DJ Version) EP: Date released: 2 July 2008; Record label: Quentin Elias Music	No. / Title / Length; 1. / "Kama Sutra (Soft Porn Radio Mix)" / 2:52; 2. / "Kama Sutra (Flash's Un-Erotic Demo Remix Edit)" / 2:56; 3. / "Kama Sutra (Explicit Master In the Studio Mix)" / 3:08
Electrofied EP: Date released: 2 September 2008; Record label: Electro Boy Inc Records / Quentin Elias Music	No. / Title / Length; 1. / "Always The Last 2008 (Flash's Love Confusion Mix)" / 4:58; 2. / "Fever (Flash Vs. "Q" Electro Boy Inc Main Event Mix)" / 4:26; 3. / "Kama Sutra (Flash's Un-Erotic Mixshow Edit)" / 2:56
Shattered Dreams EP: Date released: 3 June 2009; Record label: Electro Boy Inc Records / Quentin Elias Music	No. / Title / Length; 1. / "Shattered Dreams (Original Die for Me Mix)" / 3:48; 2. / "Shattered Dreams (Deep & Dark Mix)" / 3:41; 3. / "Shattered Dreams (Dalyx's Chill Lounge Mix)" / 3:35; 4. / "Shattered Dreams (Classic House So Divine Bass Mix)" / 3:37; 5. / "Shattered Dreams (Minimal Vocal Beat Dub)" / 3:18; 6. / "Shattered Dreams (Dalyx's Dance Pop Mix)" / 3:27; 7. / "Shattered Dreams (Filter Dat Radio Club Mix)" / 3:37
Baïla (Re Invented) EP: Date released: 15 June 2011; Record label: Electro Boy Inc Records / Quentin Elias Music	No. / Title / Length; 1. / "Baila (Je Suis Rentrer A La Maison Mix)" / 4:43; 2. / "Baila (Alterner Le Remix De Club De Dalyx)" / 4:13; 3. / "Baila (Flash Sanchez Vs. Alliage Le Remix D'electro De La Circuit)" / 3:23; 4. / "Le Temps Qui Court (Le Remix Reinvente De Dalyx)" / 3:38
I Can Do Bad All By Myself EP: Date released: 6 September 2011; Record label: Electro Boy Inc Records / Quentin Elias Music	No. / Title / Length; 1. / "For You" / 3:43; 2. / "What's Done Is Done" / 3:12; 3. / "So Far" / 3:50; 4. / "I Can Do Bad" / 5:00; 5. / "Rolling In the Deep" / 3:51; 6. / "Always the Last to Say Goodbye (Rock Re Invention Mix) (Bonus Track)" / 3:35; 7. / "Can't Stop Thinking of You (Rock Re Invention Mix) (Bonus Track)" / 3:17; 8. / "What If I? (Rock Re Invention Mix) [Bonus Track]" / 3:14
Shattered Dreams EP: Date released: 4 June 2013; Record label: Electro Boy Inc Records / Quentin Elias Music	No. / Title / Length; 1. / "Baila (Justify Radio Mix)" / 4:01; 2. / "Le Temps Qui Court (Justify Radio Mix)" / 4:00; 3. / "Cruel Summer (Justify House Remix)" / 3:43; 4. / "Baila (Je Suis Rentrer a La Maison Remix)" / 4:45; 5. / "Baila (Justified Electro Remix vs. Alliage)" / 3:23

=== Singles ===
- 1999: "Laisse aller la musique"
- 2002: "Always the Last to Say Goodbye" (maxi-single)
- 2006: "Serve It Up" (maxi-single)
- 2008: "Always the Last to Say Goodbye 2008" (Flash's Love Confusion Mix)
- 2008: "Fever (DJ Version)"
- 2009: "Shattered Dreams"
- 2009: "Take Off"
- 2009: "Casanova"
- 2009: "For You"
- 2010: "I Want Your Love" (Flash's Love Confusion Remix Edit)
- 2010: "So Far"
- 2010: "Give Me Some More" (Flash Sanchez feat. Quentin Elias)
- 2011: "Cruel Summer" (Flash Sanchez for the Boyz Drum and Synth Remix)
- 2011: "Cruel Summer" (Alternate Dalyx Club Remix)
- 2011: "Rolling in the Deep"
- 2013: "Diamonds (Extended Radio Version)"
- 2013: "Je sais"
- 2013: "Lucy"
- 2013: "Why Did You Leave Me Now"

=== Soundtrack ===
- 2008 - Between Love & Goodbye - the track "Serve It Up (NYC Club Mix)" (music & lyrics by Z. Saunders, A. Martells, performed by Quentin Elias)

Sound Department (film)

- 2009: College Debts (recording artist)

== Acting and other appearances ==
Feature films

- 2009: College Debts as Frenchy
- 2011: He Who Finds a Wife 2: Thou Shall Not Covet as Isis
- 2011: Madoff: Made Off with America (alternative title The Banksters, Madoff with America) as a jail thug / cellmate of Bernard Madoff
- 2012: Azienda (thriller)
- 2012: A Broken Code as Enzo
- 2013: The Brides of Sodom as Vampire / Satroi

Documentaries / reports

- 2008: "Boy bands: L'argent, la gloire, puis la chute" in TV documentary series Incroyables destins
- 2009: Je realise mon rêve (TV series, TF1)
- 2010: The Adonis Factor as himself (documentary film alongside models Clint Catalyst, Anderson Davis, Dakota Rivers, Christopher Saint and writer/actor Bruce Vilanch)

Theatre

- 2010: The Boulevard as Joe Kirwood (lead role in a theatre adaptation based on Sunset Boulevard, Los Angeles)

Television series (acting)

- 2009: "I Had a Bad Day" as Ricardo, one episode on the American TV series Sex Chronicles
- 2010: "End Game" as Artis, one episode on the TV series Sex Chronicles
- 2011: Things We Do for Love (American TV series, one episode)

Reality television

- 2007: My Super Sweet 16 (MTV episode) in series The Things We Do for Love
- 2009: Tellement Vrai (TV series, NRJ 12)
- 2012: L'Île des vérités (TV series, second season, NRJ 12)
- 2014: Giuseppe Ristorante, une histoire de famille (TV series, NRJ 12)
