= Clint Catalyst =

American author, actor, and stylist

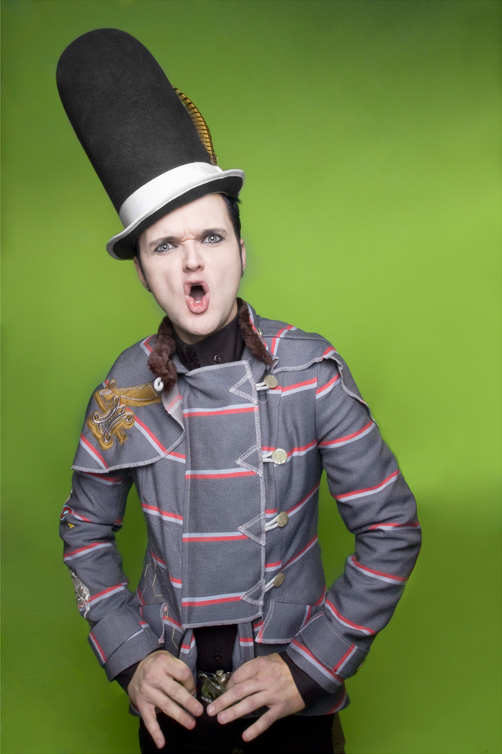
- Born: Clinton Green; April 8, 1971 (age 55); Jonesboro, Arkansas, U.S.
- Occupations: Writer, actor, performer, wardrobe styist
- Writing career
- Genres: LGBT, gay, comedy, drama, gothic
- Website: clintcatalyst.com

Clint Catalyst (born April 8, 1971) is the nom de plume of Clinton Green, an American author, actor, spoken word performer, and stylist. He has covered music, fashion, LGBT issues, and popular culture for magazines including LA Weekly, Frontiers, Out, Surface and Swindle.

== Early life ==
Born in Jonesboro, Arkansas, Catalyst was raised an only child to Southern Baptist parents. Other than a year in Germany on scholarship, he remained there until he attended Hendrix College, where he started As If magazine and received a Bachelors in English with honors distinction. British journalist Mick Mercer describes As If as an "excellent magazine in terms of its international content, the artwork and contributions. Normally poetry-based things can cause your spleen to explode with fury at wasted space but Clint knows who means what." Upon graduation, Catalyst went to San Francisco, where he earned a Master of Arts in writing from the University of San Francisco. He said he knew he was gay from a young age, but identifies with the term "queer" in regards to his orientation.

Writing in the LA Weekly, Linda Immediato called Catalyst a "Midwestern ex–meth head who came to L.A. by way of San Francisco, where he was a goth art-club darling — the most photographed model of the underground." In Los Angeles in the 1990s "he became the most sought-after nightclub... guest-list gatekeeper, wooed by seemingly every hip promoter in the city."

== Awards ==
In 1989, Catalyst was one of 25 graduating high school seniors in the U.S. to be awarded the Congress-Bundestag Youth Exchange scholarship through Nacel Open Door, which enabled him to live and study a year in Germany. Other awards include the Isaac Andrew Campbell Memorial Prize for Poetry, The Congress/Bundestag Scholarship, First Place in the San Francisco Levi-Strauss "Poetry Slam", First Place in the Mixed Media category, Second Place in the Short Story category, and Second Place in Poetry for the annual Murphy Foundation Programs in Literature and Language competitions.

== Published work ==
In 2000, Manic D Press published Catalyst's book Cottonmouth Kisses, which developed a cult following and topped Amazon's list of bestselling Gay & Lesbian books. The first section of the book, Caresses Soft as Sandpaper, was originally a chapbook published by November–March. Cottonmouth Kisses went into its second printing in 2007, when it was described as a "cult hit".

While touring together in the year 2000, Catalyst and artist Michelle Tea came up with the idea to solicit first-person narratives for their 2004 anthology Pills, Thrills, Chills and Heartache, which was published by Alyson Books. Described by Publishers Weekly as a "celebrat[ion of] the avant-garde", the book reached No. 10 on the Los Angeles Times non-fiction paperback bestseller list in its first week of release. Moreover, the book was a 2004 Lambda Literary Awards finalist in the Anthologies/Fiction category.

== Film and television ==
In 2004, Catalyst and writing partner Darren Stein co-created a proposed drama The Flyover States in a development deal with Touchstone/ABC. As an associate show producer, he worked for three cycles (2005–2006) on the reality series America's Next Top Model.

In the 2007 short film In the Spotlight, Catalyst was cast opposite Guinevere Turner as a charlatan named Bell Wartock. Catalyst also appeared in Darren Stein's 2007 short Color Me Olsen in a small role as an Oompa-Loompa impersonator. He also plays the role of Járéd Silver—a parody of Catalyst's close friend, the designer Jared Gold—in Lisa Hammer's feature film, POX.

In February 2008, Catalyst won the first place for TV Host in CBS's Big Shot Live contest. His role for the follow-up winner's episode was red carpet commentator for the 50th Grammy Awards. In November 2008, Catalyst had a cameo as the stylist for Antoine de Caunes in Allez a L.A.!, a five-part series that ran on the French Cable Network Canal Plus. In March 2009, Catalyst appeared as a special guest in an episode of the reality television series Germany's Next Topmodel, hosted by Heidi Klum.

As 'Himself', Catalyst appeared in a celluloid version of the off-musical comedy Forever Plaid, shown nationwide in theatres for one night in 2009 to celebrate the play's 20th anniversary. However, his recent role as 'The Interviewee' in Matthew Mishory's short film "Delphinium: A Childhood Portrait of Derek Jarman" has been seen at film festivals around the world. It had its world premiere at the 2009 Reykjavik International Film Festival in Iceland, its UK premiere at the Raindance Film Festival in London, and its California premiere at the 2010 Frameline International Film Festival in San Francisco. It won the Eastman Kodak Grand Prize for Best Short Film at the 2010 United States Super 8 and DV Film Festival.

Catalyst also appears as "Johnny the Bartender" in Matthew Mishory's 2012 feature Joshua Tree, 1951: A Portrait of James Dean, which stars James Preston.

Ramzi Abed's psychological thriller Noirland is still listed as "in production", though from press the film has already generated, Catalyst is credited in the role of 'The Baron.' Conversely, in Hilary Goldberg's experimental cross-genre feature recLAmation (2010), he has the role of 'Gaylord Wilshire [a] Queer Superhero.'

Catalyst is an interview subject in Christopher Hines film The Adonis Factor (2010), a documentary about body issues among men within the gay community. Among the film's reviews, Catalyst is described as "one of two interviewees who 'stand[s] out'" for being a "gothic artist model who is so painfully awkward that he becomes beautiful."

In 2011, he portrayed Salvador "The Ice Fiend Man" for episode #4.6 ("Better Them Than Us") of the SPIKE TV series 1000 Ways to Die.

As of 2019, he is the story producer of TV series The Boulet Brothers' Dragula.

== Live performances, modeling, and events ==
Catalyst has appeared as a spoken word performer at events including the Bumbershoot festival, Outfest, the Dark Arts Festival, Writers With Drinks, Scutterfest, and Convergence 9. He has also hosted literary events, including a monthly spoken word series entitled The Unhappy Hour at the Parlour Club (where he also created performance art night Touché).

He has had a variety of modeling assignments, including appearances on the covers of books, including The Best of Alice Joanou and the anthology Sons of Darkness: Tales of Men, Blood and Immortality. In March 2008, Catalyst was chosen to appear in a national Peta2 "Fur Is Dead" campaign. Moreover, from May 3 to August 31, 2008, a portrait of Catalyst, along with a filmed version of his spoken word/performance piece "To Push Away or Clutch" was on display in The Andy Warhol Museum (Pittsburgh, PA). Deemed an 'Uberstar'—along with designer Rami Kashou, photographer Dirk Mai, journalist Rose Apodaca, model/designer Audrey Kitching, and internet celebrity Cory Kennedy—Catalyst was hand-picked by sculptor/visual artist Glenn Kaino to represent his 21st Century take on Andy Warhol's Superstars.

Catalyst was a celebrity judge for the Asian Pacific AIDS Alliance Quest Beauty Pageant and was hired by Paper Magazine as a judge for Audrey Kuenstler's 'High Fashion Wrestling' event. He has also been hired as a guest host for magazine release parties and social events - he was Buzznet's official red carpet host for the 2007 Emmy Awards.

He has been described as the "muse" for avant-garde designer Jared Gold, and has worked as an event producer for some of Gold's fashion shows. In November 2009, the duo released their first collaborative design effort: a set of prize ribbons with awards such as "Epic" and "Hedonist."

== Works ==
- Caresses Soft as Sandpaper Caresses Soft as Sandpaper by Clint Catalyst at Open Library (1994)
- Full Force Full Force by Clint Catalyst at Open Library (1995)
- Cottonmouth Kisses (2000) ISBN 978-0-916397-65-4
- Pills, Thrills, Chills, and Heartache: Adventures in the First Person (with Michelle Tea) (2004) ISBN 1-55583-753-0
- Best Gay Stories 2012 (edited by Peter Dubé; story Sugar Rush was chosen as one of 15 inclusions), Lethe Press 2012 ISBN 1-59021-387-4
