= List of High School Rapper (season 1) contestants =

High School Rapper is a South Korean Hip hop survival television show.

== Contestants ==
In the first episode, Jang Yong-jun from regional Seoul - Gangdong dropped out because of center controversy about prostitution and drinking

Color key

- Contestant in Final regional
- Elimination in 1 vs. 1 battle
- Elimination in Regional competition
- Elimination in Regional representative
- Not participation in Cypher
- Left the show

Region	Name	Year	Grade	School	Round					
Region	Name	Year	Grade	School	Preliminary	Cypher battle	Regional representative	Regional competition	1 vs. 1	Final
Seoul - Gangdong (Mentor by Mad Clown)	Kim Sun-jae (snzae)	1998	3 grade	Sejong Science High School	223	4	1	262 *	53	224
Seoul - Gangdong (Mentor by Mad Clown)	Jo Min-wook	2000	2 grade	Sangmun High School	215	-	3	234		
Seoul - Gangdong (Mentor by Mad Clown)	Bang Jae-min (a.mond)	1999	2 grade	Hanlim Multi Art High School	213	3	2	234 *	43	
Seoul - Gangdong (Mentor by Mad Clown)	Jang Yong-jun (NO:EL)^{1}	2000	1 grade	Saint Paul International High School	211	-	4			
Seoul - Gangdong (Mentor by Mad Clown)	Lee Ji-eun	2000	1 grade	Korean Art High School	194	-	5			
Seoul - Gangdong (Mentor by Mad Clown)	Johnny Kwony	2000	1 grade	California Lutheran High School	192	4	7			
Seoul - Gangdong (Mentor by Mad Clown)	Kim Sang Min (MIDGT)	1998	3 grade	Seokgwan High School	183	-	6			
Seoul - Gangdong (Mentor by Mad Clown)	Kim Sun-woo ^{7}	2000	1 grade	Hanlim Multi Art High School	178	-	9			
Seoul - Gangdong (Mentor by Mad Clown)	Park Uh-jin	1999	2 grade	Sangmun High School	164	-	8			
Seoul - Gangseo (Mentor by Giriboy & Xitsuh)	Yang Hong-won (Young B)^{2}	1999	3 grade	Shindongshin Information Industry High School	283	5	1	310	56	246 **
Seoul - Gangseo (Mentor by Giriboy & Xitsuh)	Kim Yoon-ho (Yenjamin)	1999	2 grade	Sungsil High School	248	-	2	278	47	
Seoul - Gangseo (Mentor by Giriboy & Xitsuh)	Park Hwi-chan	1998	3 grade	Daeshin High School	233	4	5			
Seoul - Gangseo (Mentor by Giriboy & Xitsuh)	Shin Sang-ho (Deep Shark)	1999	2grade	Yongsan High School	226	-	6			
Seoul - Gangseo (Mentor by Giriboy & Xitsuh)	Han Ji-suk	1999	2 grade	Hwagok High School	205	-	4			
Seoul - Gangseo (Mentor by Giriboy & Xitsuh)	Mark Lee^{3}	1999	2 grade	Seoul of Performing Arts Seoul High School	204	2	3	278	57	184
Seoul - Gangseo (Mentor by Giriboy & Xitsuh)	Kim Jong-bum (Lowcho)	1999	2 grade	Shinseo High School	199	-	9			
Seoul - Gangseo (Mentor by Giriboy & Xitsuh)	Lee Seung-pyo	1999	-	-	191	-	8			
Seoul - Gangseo (Mentor by Giriboy & Xitsuh)	Kang Seung-wan	1998	3 grade	Seoul of Performing Arts Seoul High School	178	-	7			
East Gyeongin (Mentor by Swings)	Choi Ha-min (Osshun Gum)^{4}	1999	-	-	274	1	1	286 *	44	244
East Gyeongin (Mentor by Swings)	Kim Kang-woo (Wuzoo)	1998	3 grade	Uijeongbu High School	253	-	2	295		
East Gyeongin (Mentor by Swings)	Yoon Byung-ho (Bully Da Bastard / Playboi)	2000	-	-	251	2	3	295		
East Gyeongin (Mentor by Swings)	Hwang Hyun-woo	2000	1 grade	Songlim High School	247	-	4			
East Gyeongin (Mentor by Swings)	Lee Soo-rin (LUDA)	1998	-	-	242	-	6			
East Gyeongin (Mentor by Swings)	Choi Suk-hyun (Myboypeter)	1999	2 grade	Pogok High School	240	1	5			
East Gyeongin (Mentor by Swings)	Kim Ha-on (HAON)	2000	1 grade	Pangok High School	228	-	8			
East Gyeongin (Mentor by Swings)	Choi Shin-hyun (ODD)	2000	1 grade	Jingeon High School	224	-	7			
East Gyeongin (Mentor by Swings)	Kim Mi-jung (Wiggle)	1998	3 grade	Ewoo High School	218	-	9			
West Gyeongin (Mentor by Jessi)	Kim Kyu-heon (Honeyhunner)	1998	3 grade	Seojeong High School	220	3	1	270	81	189
West Gyeongin (Mentor by Jessi)	Shin Sang-ik (Volcano)	1998	-	-	220	-	5			
West Gyeongin (Mentor by Jessi)	Oh Dam-ryul (Chin Chilla)	1999	2 grade	Ansan Design Culture High School	195	1	6			
West Gyeongin (Mentor by Jessi)	Park Go-hoon	1998	-	-	191	-	9			
West Gyeongin (Mentor by Jessi)	Kim Tae-yeob (Clock)	1999	3 grade	Bongdam High School	188	-	2	270	11	
West Gyeongin (Mentor by Jessi)	Kim Dong-hyun (MC Gree)^{5}	1998	3 grade	Pungmu High School	183	2	3	259	31	
West Gyeongin (Mentor by Jessi)	Kim Hye-jung	2000	1 grade	Hyomyeong High School	182	-	4			
West Gyeongin (Mentor by Jessi)	Oh Dong-hwan (Untell)	2001	1 grade	Jeongwang High School	171	-	7			
West Gyeongin (Mentor by Jessi)	Kim Chan-soo	1999	2 grade	Inha University Senior High School	170	-	8			
Gwangju - Jeolla (Mentor by YDG)	Choi Seo-hyun (CHOI / Dooyoung)	1998	3 grade	Deokin High School	249	6	1	245		
Gwangju - Jeolla (Mentor by YDG)	Hwang In-woong (Young W)	1999	3 grade	Jeil High School		-	2	295		
Gwangju - Jeolla (Mentor by YDG)	Park Sung-gon	2000	1 grade	Jeil High School		5	6			
Gwangju - Jeolla (Mentor by YDG)	Kim Woo-hyun	2000	1 grade	Yanghyeon High School	208	-	5			
Gwangju - Jeolla (Mentor by YDG)	Lee Shin-haeng (Fourth)	2000	-	-	206	-	8			
Gwangju - Jeolla (Mentor by YDG)	Park Min (Peppermint_m)	1998	3 grade	Jindo High School		5	8			
Gwangju - Jeolla (Mentor by YDG)	Choi Yi-seung-woo (Lil Lay)	2000	1 grade	Korean Game Science High School	190	-	7			
Gwangju - Jeolla (Mentor by YDG)	Lee Ki-hoon (EVIL)	1998	3 grade	Sungil High School	188	-	3	295		
Gwangju - Jeolla (Mentor by YDG)	Kim Joon	1998	3 grade	Jeonnam Girls High School	177	-	9			
Busan - Gyeongsang (Mentor by Deepflow)	Jo Won-woo (H2ADIN)^{6}	2000	1 grade	Gyeongsang High School	262	2	1	584	89	243
Busan - Gyeongsang (Mentor by Deepflow)	Park Ka-ram (JE)	1999	-	GED	248	-	6			
Busan - Gyeongsang (Mentor by Deepflow)	Lee Dong-min (Rapto / ICEPUFF)	1998	3 grade	Jungang High School	238	6	2	300	69	202
Busan - Gyeongsang (Mentor by Deepflow)	Woo Sang-woo (PEACE)	1998	3 grade	Gyesong High School	237	-	5			
Busan - Gyeongsang (Mentor by Deepflow)	Hwang Hye-jung	1998	3 grade	Jangyu High School	214	-	4			
Busan - Gyeongsang (Mentor by Deepflow)	Sung Yong-hyun (Yonketer)	1998	3 grade	Gyeongbuk Industrial High School	206	6	8			
Busan - Gyeongsang (Mentor by Deepflow)	Kim Jae-yeon	2001	1 grade	Jungang High School	202	-	9			
Busan - Gyeongsang (Mentor by Deepflow)	Lee Hyun-woo (S-wave)	1999	2 grade	Jungang High School	202	-	10			
Busan - Gyeongsang (Mentor by Deepflow)	Jung In-seol (JISSCLASS)	1998	3 grade	Gacheon High School	200	-	3	300	19	
Busan - Gyeongsang (Mentor by Deepflow)	Park Sang-bum	1998	3 grade	Gimcheon Art High School	198	-	7			

Note : * mean the contestant save in wildcard challenge ** mean the contestant winner

Note: in Cypher battle of contestants who ranked 6th in preliminary round, Mark Lee and MC Gree (Lee Dong-hyun) received the same number of votes, therefore they both ranked 2nd in Cypher battle.

== Cypher battle round (Episode 3 & 4) ==
Color key

- Seoul - Gangdong (Mentor by Mad Clown)
- Seoul - Gangseo (Mentor by Giriboy & Xitsuh)
- East Gyeongin (Mentor by Swings)
- West Gyeongin (Mentor by Jessi)
- Gwangju - Jeolla (Mentor by YDG)
- Gyeongsang (Mentor by Deepflow)

#	1	2	3	4	5	6
#1 Cypher	Choi Ha-min	Jo Won-woo	Kim Kyu-heon	Kim Sun-jae	Yang Hong-won	Choi Seo-hyun
#3 Cypher	Oh Dam-ryul	Yoon Byung-ho	Bang Jae-min	Park Hwi-chan	Park Sang-gon	Lee Dong-min
#6 Cypher	Choi Suk-hyun	Kim Dong-hyun	Mark Lee (Joint Second)	Johnny Kwonny	Park Min	Sung Yong-hyun

== Final regional representative (Episode 4) ==
The final regional representative tournaments are held in 1: 1: 1 confrontation, and the mentor selects one successful candidate.

#	Seoul - Gangdong	Seoul - Gangseo	East Gyeongin	West Gyeongin	Gwangju - Jeolla	Busan - Gyeongsang
1	Kim Sun-jae	Yang Hong-won	Choi Ha-min	Kim Kyu-heon	Choi Seo-hyun	Jo Won-woo
2	Bang Jae-min	Kim Yoon-ho	Kim Kang-woo	Kim Tae-yeob	Hwang In-woong	Lee Dong-min
3	Jo Min-wook	Mark Lee	Yoon Byung-ho	Kim Dong-hyun	Lee Ki-hoon	Jung In-seol
4	Jang Yong-jun	Han Ji-suk	Hwang Hyun-woo	Kim Hye-joong	Park Min	Hwang Hye-jung
5	Lee Ji-eun	Park Hwi-chan	Choi Suk-hyun	Shin Sang-ik	Kim Woo-hyun	Woo Sang-woo
6	Kim Sang-min	Shin Sang-ho	Lee Soo-rin	Oh Dam-ryul	Park Sung-gon	Park Ka-ram
7	Johnny Kwonny	Kang Seung-hwan	Choi Shin-hyun	Oh Dong-hwan	Choi Yi-seung-woo	Park Sang-bum
8	Park Uh-jin	Lee Seung-pyo	Kim Ha-on	Kim Chan-soo	Lee Shin-haeng	Sung Yong-hyun
9	Kim Sun-woo	Kim Jong-bum	Kim Mi-jung	Park Go-hoon	Kim Joon	Kim Jae-yeon
10						Lee Hyun-woo

Contestant save
Contestant elimination

== Seoul - Gangseo vs. East Gyeongin ==
Regional	Seoul - Gangseo	Vote	East Gyeongin
Duo performance	Kim Yoon-ho, Mark Lee (Sing Sang Sung)	278 : 295	Kim Kang-woo, Yoon Byung-ho (Major Depression)
Rapper & mentor collaboration	Giriboy & Xitsuh, Yang Hong-won (Bunzy)	310 : 286	Swings, Choi Ha-min (Naw Mean)

== Gwangju - Jeolla vs. Busan - Gyeongsang ==
Regional	Gwangju - Jeolla	Vote	Busan - Gyeongsang
Freestyle rap battle	Choi Seo-hyun (Beat by. AD & Sorry Jay Nari - Way Up)	245 : 284	Jo Won-woo (Beat by. DJ Morrisson - Turn it Up)
Group performance	YDG, Choi Seo-hyun, Hwang In-woong, Lee Ki-hoon (Jinttobaegi)	295 : 300	Deepflow, Jo Won-woo, Jung In-seol, Lee Dong-min (Seoul Calliber)

== Seoul - Gangdong vs. West Gyeongin ==
Regional	Seoul - Gangdong	Vote	West Gyeongin
Textbook rap	Bang Jae-min, Jo Min-wook (Yallari)	234 : 270	Kim Kyu-heon, Kim Tae-yeob (Rap Dream)
Rapper & mentor performance	Mad Clown, Kim Sun-jae (Bully)	262 : 259	Jessi, Kim Dong-hyun (I'm Good)

Winner
Lose

== Wildcard challenge ==
#	Name	Regional
1	Kim Sun-jae	Seoul - Gangdong
2	Choi Ha-min	East Gyeongin
3	Bang Jae-min	Seoul - Gangdong
4	Yoon Byung-ho	East Gyeongin
5	Choi Seo-hyun	Gwangju - Jeolla
6	Lee Ki-hoon	Gwangju - Jeolla
7	Jo Min-wook	Seoul - Gangdong
8	Hwang In-woong	Gwangju - Jeolla
9	Kim Kang-woo	East Gyeongin

Contestant save
Contestant elimination

== 1 vs. 1 (Episode 7) ==
A	Result	B
Kim Kyu-heon	81:19	Jung In-seol
Mark Lee	57:43	Bang Jae-min
Kim Sun-jae	53:47	Kim Yoon-ho
Kim Tae-yeob	11:89	Jo Won-woo
Kim Dong-hyun	31:69	Lee Dong-min
Yang Hong-won	56:44	Choi Ha-min

Contestant save
Contestant elimination

== Final round (Episode 8) ==
#	Regional	Contestant	Featuring	Song	Result
1	Busan - Gyeongsang	Lee Dong-min	G2, Don Millis	Golden Fire	202
2	Seoul - Gangdong	Kim Sun-jae	Hyolyn	Bell	224
3	West Gyeongin	Kim Kyu-heon	Jessi, Babylon	Star	189
4	Seoul - Gangseo	Mark Lee	Kang Seul-gi of Red Velvet	Drop	184
5	East Gyeongin	Choi Ha-min	FNRL, Homeboy	Come For You	244
6	Busan - Gyeongsang	Jo Won-woo	Samuel Seo, Nucksal	Home	243
7	Seoul - Gangseo	Yang Hong-won	Crucial Star	Better Man	246

Winner
Runner-up

== Notes ==
- ^{1}The first episode, Jang Yong-jun (known as (NO:EL) left the show because his controversy, involving prostitution and drinking. It's also known he's the son of politician Chang Je-won.
- ^{2}Yang Hong-won (known as Young B) was a contestant on competition show Show Me the Money 5.
- ^{3}Mark Lee is member of NCT under SM Entertainment.
- ^{4}After the end of the program, Choi Ha-min (known as Osshun Gum) joined the label Just Music.
- ^{5}Kim Dong-hyun (known as MC Gree) is a rapper under Brand New Music.
- ^{6}Jo Won-woo (known as H2ADIN) was a runner-up contestant on SRS2016 in Busan.
- ^{7}Aftermath, Kim Sun-woo was debuted in member boy group The Boyz.
