= Charo =

Spanish actress, singer and comedian

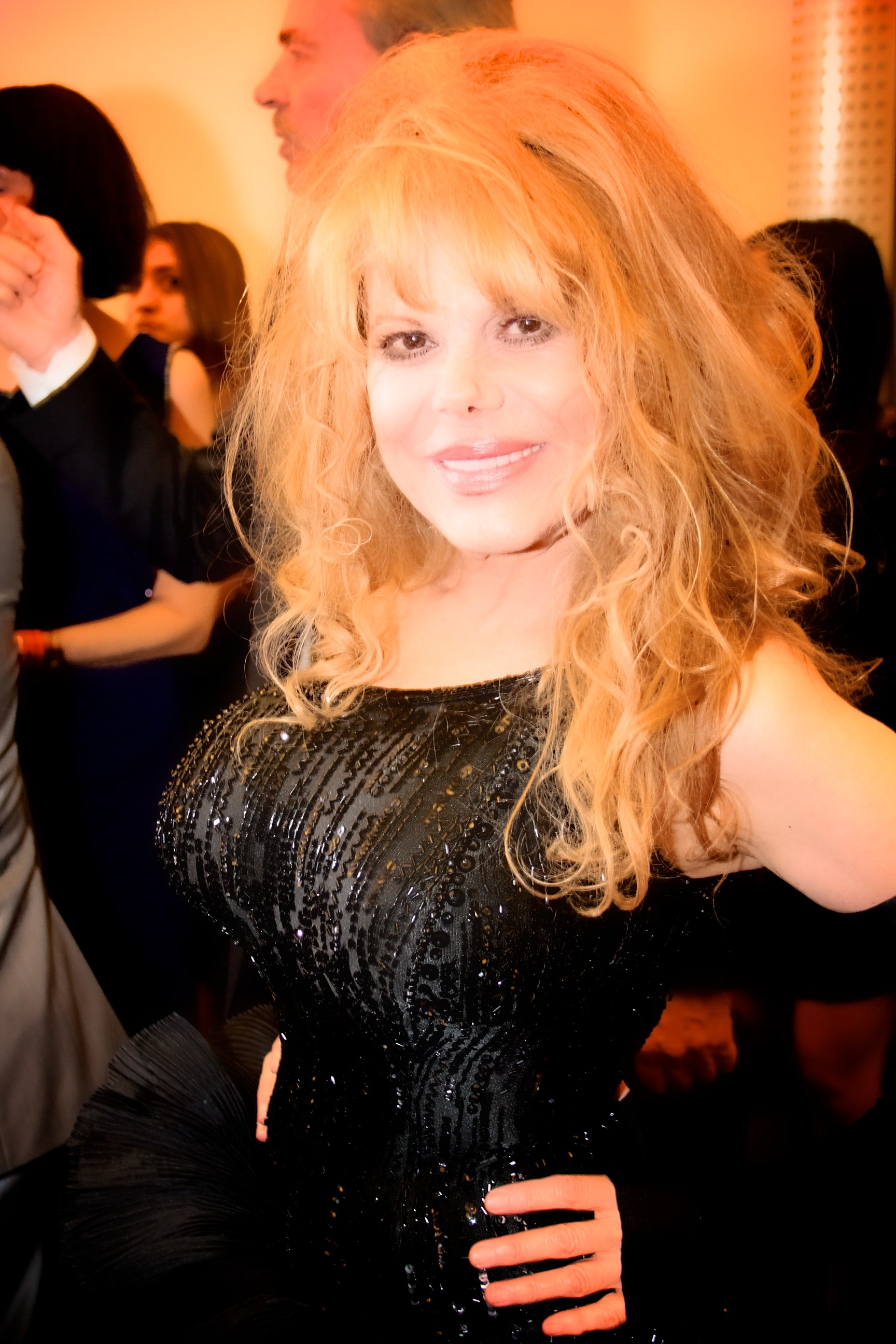
- Charo at the 2013 Alma Awards
- Born: Maria Rosario Pilar Martinez Molina Baeza (Note: Though Charo's official English-language website gives her name as Maria Rosario Pilar Martinez Molina Baeza without accent marks, other sources give longer versions of her name, some of which are contradictory: for example María del Rosario Pilar Martínez Molina Baeza, María del Rosario Mercedes Pilar Martínez Molina Baeza, Maria Rosario Pilar Lorenza Emilia Eugenia Martinez Molina Baeza De La Osa Rasten, or María del Rosario Pilar Martínez Molina Gutiérrez de los Perales Santa Ana Romanguera y de la Hinojosa Rasten, but with a shorter version in the text of the same source.) (See DOB Section); Murcia, Region of Murcia, Spain
- Occupations: Actress; singer; classical guitarist; comedian
- Years active: 1963–present
- Spouses: Xavier Cugat (m. 1966; div. 1978) Kjell Rasten (m. 1978; died 2019)
- Children: 1
- Website: Official website

María Rosario Pilar Martínez Molina Baeza, professionally known by her stage name Charo, is a Spanish-born actress, singer, comedian, and flamenco guitarist who rose to international prominence in the 1960s on American television, as well as starring in several films.

Charo began playing classical (Spanish-style) guitar at the age of nine, training under the famed guitarist Andrés Segovia. In 1966, she married 66-year-old bandleader Xavier Cugat and moved to the United States with him. In the late 1960s and 1970s, she became a ubiquitous presence on American television, frequently appearing as a guest star on series such as Laugh-In, Fantasy Island, The Love Boat, and The Tonight Show Starring Johnny Carson. She is known for her uninhibited and exuberant manner, high energy levels, vague age, heavy Spanish accent, and catchphrase "cuchi-cuchi". She frequently pokes fun at herself, while also pointing out the potential judgment of others, through her accent.

As a musician, Charo has performed and recorded in various styles for five decades. She released a series of disco recordings in the 1970s with Salsoul Records, most notably Dance a Little Bit Closer (1977). In 1995, her flamenco album Guitar Passion (1994) was awarded Female Pop Album of the Year at the Billboard International Latin Music Conference, and was named Best Female Latin Pop Album by Billboard Magazine. In an interview, Charo has said, "Around the world I am known as a great musician. But in America, I am known as the cuchi-cuchi girl. That's okay, because cuchi-cuchi has taken me all the way to the bank."

== Early life ==
Charo claims she was born on January 15, 1951, in the city of Murcia, Spain. Her birth date has been a matter of some dispute (see 'Birth year controversy' below). Her Spanish passport gives her name as María del Rosario Mercedes Pilar Martínez Molina Baeza.

Charo has claimed she was enrolled in a convent school until the age of 15, when a nun told her that she belonged in show business. In the most colorful version of her childhood, Charo's grandmother hired a music professor to give her weekly classical guitar lessons, and he became the first man to enter the convent.

In a 2005 interview, she reminisced:

"The institution had great young teachers and students. Everything was a charity. Mr. Segovia, between concerts that's when he'd come, and if you'd been there a year and you weren't good, you'd go out and they would give your place to another young kid."

Charo has stated in several interviews that she graduated with honors at age 16.

Bandleader Xavier Cugat "discovered" her while in Spain filming a television special in 1964. They wed on August 7, 1966. An April 1966 column by Earl Wilson on the couple's wedding plans announced:

"Sixty-year-old Xavier Cugat and his 20-year-old Spanish girlfriend and singing star Charo hope to marry in San Cugat, Spain, in a few days if Cugat can convince church authorities his two divorces should not be counted against him since he wasn't married in church."

They were the first couple to be wed at Caesars Palace in Las Vegas. Charo later claimed that her marriage to Cugat was merely a business contract, a way for him to legally bring her to the United States.

=== Birth year controversy ===
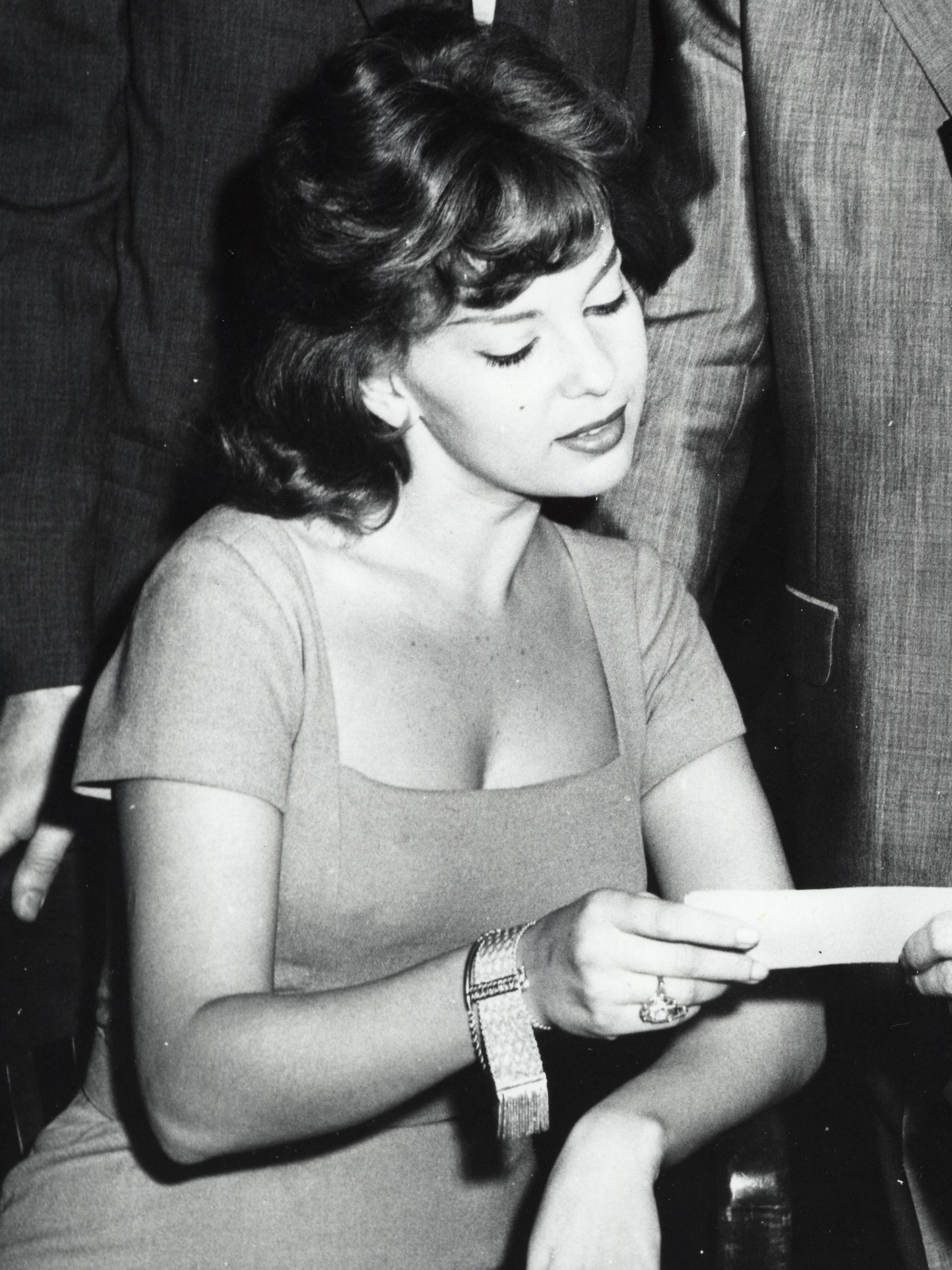
Charo in the 1960s

Charo's year of birth is the subject of dispute. Her Spanish birth certificate and passport, as well as her American naturalization papers, give her birthdate as March 13, 1941. She later claimed she was born in 1947, then changed it to 1949. In 1977, she asserted in a court hearing that her passport and naturalization papers were incorrect and that her birthdate was January 15, 1951.

Several newspaper articles around the time of her 1966 wedding to Cugat gave Charo's age as 17. Others referred to her as Cugat's "18-year-old protégée". An April 1966 column on the wedding plans stated that she was 20 and Cugat was 60. Many sources identified her as 21 on the day of her wedding.

Later, when asserting her birthdate was 1951, she claimed her parents allowed her to falsify her age to appear older when marrying Cugat. However, that would have made her 15 at the time, contradicting her claim to have graduated from school at 16, not yet having begun her performing career. She has never clarified the discrepancy.

In October 1977, the same year in which Charo filed for divorce from Cugat and became a naturalized American citizen, judge Roger Foley in Las Vegas adjudicated the 1951 birth year to be official. Charo provided sworn affidavits from her parents, although the claim has been viewed with skepticism. Commenting on the disputes over her age, she has said that the public's disbelief could prove advantageous:

"But if people really believe I'm older, that's fine. Don't be surprised if I come out with my own cosmetics, a new energy bar, and maybe some vitamins."

== Career ==
Charo was highly visible throughout the 1970s, appearing ten times on The Love Boat, and on variety and talk shows such as Donny & Marie, Tony Orlando and Dawn, The Captain and Tennille, The John Davidson Show, The Mike Douglas Show (which she guest-hosted at least once) and The Brady Bunch Hour.

In 1975, Dallas Morning News critic Harry Bowman wrote that the ABC network had "penciled in . . . a half-hour comedy starring the uninhibited wife of Xavier Cugat" and commented, "This is probably the worst idea of the season." By October of that year, Charo was promoting a TV special slated for November, but it did not actually appear until May 1976.

A television listing for August 24, 1976, shows what appears to be an unsold pilot airing on ABC at 8:30 p.m. CST: "Charo and the Sergeant—Situation comedy starring Charo Cugat. Charo's first U.S. job is to be a dancer at an off-limits nightclub, and her conservative Marine Corps husband finds out. The few episodes that were taped ended up being broadcast on the American Armed Forces Network overseas." Writer Bruce Vilanch wrote about his work on Charo and the Sergeant in his 2025 memoir It Seemed Like a Bad Idea at the Time.

By the late 1970s, Charo was being mentioned as an example of how overexposure could damage a celebrity. One such article quoted the "Q score" of Performer Q, Steve Levitt's celebrity popularity rating service, to show that her popularity declined slightly even as her familiarity increased:

Before she gained national fame on talk shows in 1975, bosomy Latina starlet Charo was 'recognized' by 57 percent of Levitt's national television sample and had a 'popularity quotient' of 9 percent. Today, known by 80 percent, a figure as high as Clint Eastwood's 80 percent, Charo's popularity is 8 percent. 'If she was known by 100 percent of the world, chances are her popularity might go down to 7 or 6 percent,' Levitt says coolly. That paradox makes some performers think twice when invitations to talk shows come in.

— "The TV Talk Shows", The Washington Post July 14, 1977 (Style section, pg. B1)

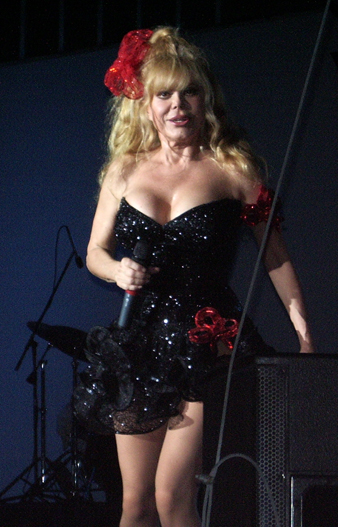
Charo performing in 2004

She was named Best Flamenco Guitarist in Guitar Player Magazine's readers' poll twice.

Charo returned to the dance-music scene in June 2008 with the single "España Cañi", which was released through Universal Wave Records.

On March 1, 2017, Charo was revealed as a contestant for Season 24 of Dancing with the Stars, paired with professional dancer Keo Motsepe. On April 3, 2017, they were the second couple eliminated from the competition and finished in 11th place.

== Personal life ==
In 1977, she became a naturalized citizen of the United States. That year, she filed for divorce from Cugat, which was granted on April 14, 1978.

On August 11, 1978, she married her second husband, producer Kjell Rasten, in South Lake Tahoe, California. He soon became her manager. They had one child, son Shel Rasten (born 1981), who is the drummer for the heavy metal band Treazen. He is also an actor and producer, known for The Boulevard (2013), FAMOUS (and on the List) (2010) and CSI: Miami (2002).

They moved to Hawaii, but eventually moved back to Beverly Hills, California.

Kjell Rasten died by suicide on February 18, 2019, at the age of 78. Charo publicly stated:

In recent years, his health began to decline and he developed a rare and horrible skin disease called bullous pemphigoid. He also became very depressed. That, along with the many medications he needed to take, became too much for him, and he ended his suffering.

== Discography ==
=== Albums ===
- Cuchi-Cuchi (1977) (with the Salsoul Orchestra)
- Olé Olé (1978) (with the Salsoul Orchestra)
- Bailando con Charo (Dancing with Charo, 1981) (with the Salsoul Orchestra)
- Guitar Passion (1994)
- Gusto (Pleasure, 1997)
- Charo and Guitar (2005)

=== Singles ===
- 1976: "La Salsa"
- 1977: "Dance a Little Bit Closer" – US Dance No. 18; UK No. 44
- 1978: "Mamacita, ¿dónde está Santa Claus?" ("Mommy, Where's Santa Claus?")
- 1978: "Olé Olé" – US Dance No. 36
- 1979: "Sha Na Na"
- 1979: "Stay with Me" – US Dance No. 55
- 1979: "Hot Love"
- 1981: "La Mojada (Wet Back)"
- 2003: "Prisionera De Tu Amor" (with Seductive Souls)
- 2008: "España Cañi" – US Dance No. 14
- 2011: "Sexy Sexy" – US Dance No. 24
- 2013: "Dance a Little Bit Closer" (Charo & the Salsoul Orchestra vs. the Cube Guys Remix)

== Filmography ==
Year	Title	Role	Notes
1963	New Friendship	—N/a	
1963	Ensayo general para la muerte	—N/a	English Title: "Dress Rehearsal for Death"
1967	The Big Mouth	Mexican Maid	Uncredited
1970	Tiger by the Tail	Darlita	
1970	Elvis: That's the Way It Is	Herself	Documentary
1979	The Concorde... Airport '79	Margarita	
1988	Moon Over Parador	Madame Loop	
1994	Thumbelina	Mrs. Toad	Voice
1996	Blame It on the Macarena!		
2017	Sharknado 5: Global Swarming	The Queen of the United Kingdom	
2021	The Bitch Who Stole Christmas		
2026	Stop! That! Train!	Sexy Traffic Controller	

== Television ==
- The Danny Kaye Show (October 6, 1965)
- The Ed Sullivan Show (four episodes; 1965–67)
- Ironside (one episode; S05E19 "Find a Victim", 1972)
- The Carol Burnett Show
- The Cher Show (May 14, 1975)
- The Tonight Show Starring Johnny Carson
- Rowan & Martin's Laugh In
- Donny & Marie 1976
- The Hollywood Squares (semiregular panelist; 1972–78, 1986–89, 1998–2004)
- The Charo Show (1976; unsold pilot for variety series)
- Chico and the Man (cast member from 1977 to 1978) -- Aunt Charo
- Sha Na Na, Season 3
- The Love Boat (guest-starred in 10 episodes, 1977–84) -- April Lopez
- Flying High (guest-starred in episode #9, 1978–1979)
- Fantasy Island (guest-starred in four episodes, 1981–84)
- The Facts of Life (guest appearance in 1985)
- The Jeffersons (January 8, 1985)
- The Tortellis (March 8, 1987)
- Marblehead Manor (February 18, 1988)
- Pee-wee's Playhouse Christmas Special (guest star; 1988)
- Mickey Mouse Works (special guest voiceover)
- That '70s Show (special guest appearance: "Red Sees Red" in 2000)
- The Brak Show (special guest star; 2001)
- The Surreal Life (cast member; 2004)
- So NoTORIous (Season 1, Episode 5 in 2006)
- I Love the '70s: Volume 2 (appearances in 2006)
- Chappelle's Show (guest appearance in 2006)
- Las Vegas
- Viva Hollywood! (new reality show on VH1; May 11, 2008)
- The Tonight Show with Jay Leno (special appearance April 17, 2008)
- Chelsea Lately (special appearance; July 24, 2008)
- The Tonight Show with Jay Leno (special appearance; December 18, 2008)
- RuPaul's Drag Race (special guest, "Absolut Drag Ball"; March 9, 2009)
- The Suite Life on Deck (special appearance as Esteban's mother; 2010)
- The Wendy Williams Show (Episode 363; aired October 5, 2010)
- Don't Trust the B— in Apartment 23 (special appearance May 17, 2013)
- Hell's Kitchen (dining-room guest; May 26, 2015)
- Celebrity Wife Swap (aired June 17, 2015)
- Jane the Virgin (special appearance March 28, 2016)
- RuPaul's Drag Race (special appearance April 4, 2016)
- Dancing with the Stars (contestant during Season 24, 2017)
- RuPaul's Drag Race (special appearance March 13, 2020)
- RuPaul's Drag Race (special appearance March 3, 2023: "50/50's Most Gagworthy Stars")
- Generation Gap (special appearance September 21, 2023)

== See also ==
- List of Spanish Americans
- Mononymous person
- Age fabrication
