= P.A.W.S. =

Pets Are Wonderful Support
- Abbreviation: PAWS or P.A.W.S.
- Formation: October 1, 1987; 39 years ago
- Headquarters: San Francisco, California
- Website: www.pawssf.org

P.A.W.S. or Pets Are Wonderful Support refers to a number of North American non-profit organisations that advocate the value of the bond between humans and their pets as a means to extend a person's quality of life and life-span, specifically elderly or disabled persons. The PAWS organizations provide subsidized pet food, veterinary care, pet medication, and human services such as dog walking, litter box cleaning, and transportation to thousands of clients, all free of charge. They are a leading organization in the world of pet care and pet appreciation.

== History ==
The first PAWS organization was founded in San Francisco, California in 1987 as part of the response to the HIV/AIDS crisis when volunteers at the San Francisco AIDS Foundation food bank noticed that HIV/AIDS patients had used the food supplied to them to feed their pets. PAWS began with a focus on AIDS patients, many of whom (especially in the earlier days of the AIDS epidemic) found themselves without support from family and friends, and relied on their pets for companionship. In 2003, PAWS San Francisco expanded its services to persons with other serious illnesses or mental health problems, and in 2007 to senior citizens with low incomes.

More than thirty other PAWS agencies (which are modeled on, but independent of, the San Francisco group) have been established in other North American cities. Actress Nadia Sutton founded the Los Angeles agency (now known as PAWS/LA) in 1989.

== PAWS NY ==
In 2009, Rachel Herman founded PAWS NY, which offers services to clients across New York City who have physical and financial barriers to caring for their pets. The organization provides services such as volunteer dog walking, litter box maintenance, and other pet care; a pet food pantry; foster care; and discounted veterinary services to its clients. In 2019, PAWS NY helped 275 people and their 387 pets across New York City and in 2020, the organization was featured on The Weekend TODAY Show.

== PAWS San Diego ==
PAWS San Diego was founded in 1993 in Northern San Diego County, as "P.A.W.S. North County". The founder operated the organization out of her own home, and used her own car to deliver the ideals of P.A.W.S. to San Diegans.

In 1997, P.A.W.S. North County expanded its services to low income, disabled, chronically ill and elderly clients. In 2001 P.A.W.S. San Diego County was founded when the greater San Diego office was absorbed as a result of financial issues. In 2005, P.A.W.S. San Diego County doubled the number of its clients and partnered with San Diego Humane Society to share office space and storage. In 2006 P.A.W.S. San Diego County leased an office space in City Heights and expanded its operations. By 2011 they had outgrown their space and moved to a warehouse space in Grantville and adopted the name "PAWS San Diego."

Today PAWS San Diego has established itself as an integral part of the San Diego community by delivering essential pet supplies and support to homebound San Diegans through their Wellness program and supplemental meals and assisting other San Diego non-profits through their PAWS Pantry program.
