= Bruce Vilanch =

American comedy writer, head writer for the Oscars (born 1948)

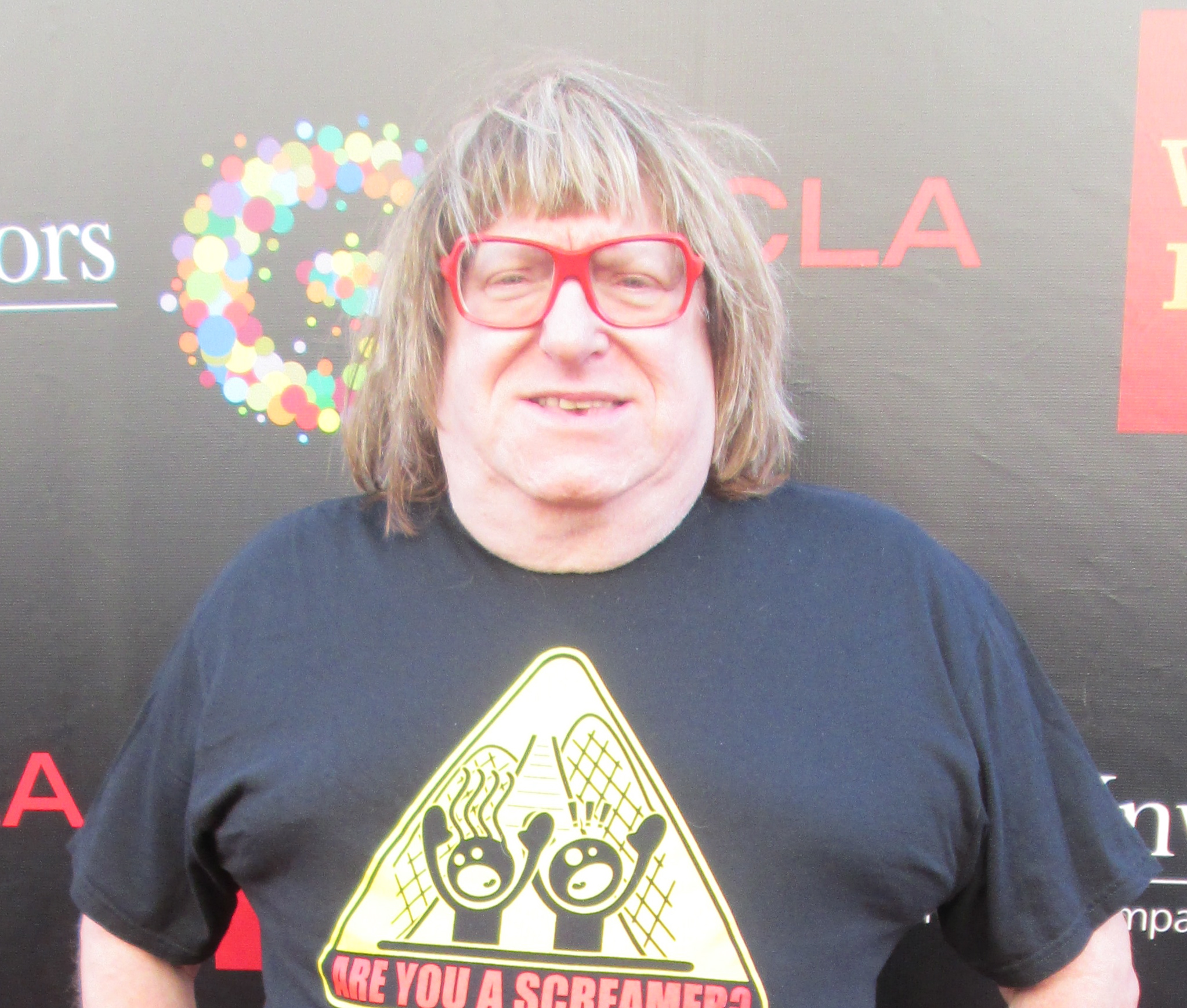
- Vilanch in 2012
- Born: Bruce Gerald Vilanch; November 23, 1948 (age 77); New York City, U.S.
- Occupations: Writer; songwriter; actor
- Years active: 1974–present

Bruce Gerald Vilanch (born November 23, 1948) is an American comedy writer, songwriter, and actor. He is a two-time Emmy Award–winner. Vilanch is best known to the public for his four-year stint on Hollywood Squares, as a celebrity participant; behind the scenes he was head writer for the show. In 2000, he performed off-Broadway in his self-penned one-man show, Bruce Vilanch: Almost Famous.

From 2000 to 2014, Vilanch was the head writer for the Oscars, after being an Oscar program co-writer for the previous ten years. He is a featured writer for the Tonys, Grammys, and Emmys.

== Early life and education ==
Vilanch was born in New York City and raised in Paterson, New Jersey, where he was a graduate of Eastside High School. When he was four days old, he was adopted by Jonas Vilanch, an optometrist, and his wife Henne, a housewife. Having her own theatrical aspirations, Vilanch's mother helped launch her son's show business career by getting him signed on with Lane Bryant's Charming Chub division as a chubby child model. Upon graduating from high school, Vilanch attended The Ohio State University as a theater and journalism student. While there, he appeared in student theater productions and wrote reviews, hoping it would be the beginning of a career as a playwright. In 1999 Vilanch stated, "I was going to be Neil Simon, batting out one Broadway show after another."

Vilanch, who is Jewish, attended Hebrew school, was a member of United Synagogue Youth, and had a bar mitzvah ceremony.

== Writing career ==
Vilanch's career in the entertainment industry began with writing features for the Chicago Tribune. As an entertainment writer, he began spending time with as many celebrities as would let him. It was how he met then-struggling nightclub singer Bette Midler. Becoming friends, Vilanch later wrote comedy material for Midler's 1974 Broadway show Clams on the Half Shell and co-wrote Divine Madness for her in 1980.

Following a move to Los Angeles, Vilanch was a co-writer for The Donny & Marie Show, The Paul Lynde Halloween Special, Star Wars Holiday Special, and The Brady Bunch Hour. After cancellation of the Brady Bunch show, he went on to write jokes for Lily Tomlin, Billy Crystal, Roseanne Barr, Rosie O'Donnell, Paul Reiser, Dame Elizabeth Taylor, Steven Tyler of Aerosmith, and Robin Williams.

The night before the final broadcast of Johnny Carson's The Tonight Show, Bette Midler serenaded Carson with "You Made Me Watch You", to the tune of "You Made Me Love You (I Didn't Want to Do It)", with lyrics written by Vilanch, the farewell song later winning an Emmy award. For four years, Vilanch was head writer and celebrity square on Hollywood Squares, next to friend and client Whoopi Goldberg. Since 1980, Vilanch has been a reporter and columnist for The Advocate, writing both humorous and serious pieces. Bruce!: My Adventures in the Skin Trade and Other Essays, a 2000 collection of his writings, was nominated for a Lambda Literary Award.

When asking him to write material for one of her concert tours, Barbra Streisand offered what Vilanch felt was a "ridiculously low" wage. Vilanch declined her offer. She later asked him to write for one of her upcoming Las Vegas appearances.

Vilanch co-wrote the book for the musical Platinum, which briefly played on Broadway in 1978. He has also contributed to concert shows starring Michael Feinstein, Bette Midler and Diana Ross.

As a songwriter, Vilanch co-wrote "Where Is My Man" with musicians Fred Zarr and Jacques Morali. The song was popularized by singer/actress Eartha Kitt in 1983. Also with Zarr and Morali, Vilanch co-wrote "Sex Over the Phone," a minor hit for the Village People that later became a cult favorite.

In 2008, Vilanch co-wrote The Showgirl Must Go On with Midler. The show opened at Caesars Palace in Las Vegas, receiving positive reviews. Stage and screen veteran Florence Henderson and Vilanch teamed for An Evening with Friends in 2010. The show featured Henderson sharing songs and stories from her career on stage, screen, and television. Vilanch had a longstanding friendship with Henderson, writing for her one-woman show as well as several of The Brady Bunch Variety Hour episodes in the early 1980s.

In 2025, Vilanch published the memoir It Seemed Like a Bad Idea at the Time, that tells of his involvement in some of the worst moments in entertainment history.

=== Academy Awards writer ===
Vilanch wrote for the Academy Awards from 1989 to 2014, providing topical joke material for the show's hosts. In the 1990s, Vilanch collaborated with hosts Whoopi Goldberg, David Letterman, and Billy Crystal. He became head writer in 2000, serving until 2014.

Among Vilanch's duties as Oscar writer were coming up with additional jokes for the host based on unexpected events that have occurred during the telecast. Most memorably, at the 1992 ceremony he came up with a series of one-liners that host Billy Crystal told throughout the night after 73-year-old Jack Palance (Crystal's City Slickers co-star) did one-armed push-ups during his Best Supporting Actor acceptance speech.

In a 2010 Vanity Fair interview, Vilanch was asked for whom he wrote the Oscars show jokes, replying: "I write across the board. Every year it breaks down differently, depending on the host, but as we get closer to the date, all of the writers tend to be writing over each other. Everyone's contributing to everybody else's work. There are four of us writing the actual show, and you end up writing and rewriting so many things at the same time. So I do a little of everything. There's a lot of mileage involved in writing for the Academy Awards, you go through a lot of hoops." When asked if he could see himself doing the job for another 21 years, he replied: "Absolutely. It's the greatest show on Earth. It's like asking somebody, 'Hey, would you like to play in the Super Bowl next year?' Did anybody get into football not to play in the Super Bowl? Does anybody get into show business not to do the biggest show in the world?"

== Acting career ==
In 1975, Vilanch made his feature film début playing a dress manufacturer in the film Mahogany, starring Diana Ross. His professional relationship with Ross continued by writing material for her stage act.

In the 1980s, Vilanch had a few acting appearances, including a bit part in an episode of Bosom Buddies and a brief scene in Breathless with his longtime friend Richard Gere. In 1984, he had a role in the comedy/science-fiction film The Ice Pirates. In the 1990s, Vilanch appeared on TV again in Law & Order. In 2000, Vilanch performed his off-Broadway one-man show Bruce Vilanch: Almost Famous at the Westbeth Theatre Center.

In 2005, Vilanch starred on Broadway as Edna Turnblad in the long-running 2002 musical Hairspray after playing the role for two years in the show's first national stage tour of 2003–06.

In 2026, Vilanch appeared on Broadway in Celebrity Autobiography, as part of the rotating guest cast.

== Other film and television appearances ==
Bruce Vilanch's first television appearance as himself was in 1988, when he was interviewed by Chris Aable, the host and producer of the cable show Hollywood Today.

He played himself in a 2001 episode of The Simpsons titled "Pokey Mom".

Vilanch appeared in the third season of Celebrity Fit Club in 2006, losing 21 pounds over the course of the show.

On RuPaul's Drag Race 3, Vilanch appeared as a guest judge dressed as Santa Claus. On RuPaul's Drag Race 5, he appeared as a coach helping the contestants in a comedy roast of RuPaul. On RuPaul's Drag Race 6 (2014), he appeared as a guest judge in a stand-up comedy challenge ("Drag Queens of Comedy").

In April 2008, Vilanch filmed a commercial that spoofs Kobe Bryant's jump over an Aston Martin. In his video, Vilanch is distracted, does not jump, and is run over by a semi truck.

He played himself in the 2008 film, You Don't Mess with the Zohan and in Walk a Mile in My Pradas, a 2011 American gay body-switching romantic comedy film. Then the following year in 2012, he poorly portrayed Arnold Schwarzenegger in the Tatyana Ali episode of the Adult Swim talk show The Eric Andre Show on Cartoon Network.

In 2012, he appeared in season 4 episode 9 of Shark Tank.

In 2015, Vilanch played himself in a guest voice role on the Disney XD animated series Penn Zero: Part-Time Hero. In 2022, he voiced two roles in the anthology audio drama series, Around the Sun.

In August 2025 it was announced that Vilanch had lent his voice to star in Whale 52 - Suite for Man, Boy, and Whale, a short film animated by Bill Plympton. It was one of 113 Oscar-qualified animated shorts and in March 2026 it won a Crystal Bear for Best Short Film at the Berlin International Film Festival.

=== Documentaries ===
Vilanch was the subject of the 1999 documentary Get Bruce. The film included interviews with Bette Midler, Robin Williams, Billy Crystal, and Whoopi Goldberg and grossed $43,000 in the domestic market. Vilanch's mother, whom he credits with developing his sense of humor, also appeared in the documentary.

The documentary Laughing Matters...The Men, also released as Laughing Matters: Gay Comedy in America (2007), featured Vilanch alongside Alec Mapa, Bob Smith, Scott Kennedy, Andre Kelley and Eddie Sarfaty. He appears as a commentator in The Adonis Factor, the 2010 documentary by Christopher Hines about gay male body image.

== Charity work ==
As well as performing in non-profit benefits, Vilanch's charitable work includes serving on the honorary board of Aid For AIDS and once serving as master of ceremonies for the Los Angeles organization's largest annual fundraiser, "Quest for the Crown".

Vilanch emceed the event "Dancers Responding to AIDS", a program of Broadway Cares/Equity Fights AIDS, in 2009 and 2010. In October 2010, Vilanch co-wrote and hosted the Los Angeles PAWS fundraiser, "An Evening with Tab Hunter".

In May 2017, Vilanch hosted the celebrity roast of Michael Musto which raised money for the Callen-Lorde Community Health Center. The evening featured Bianca Del Rio, Jinkx Monsoon, Orfeh, Michael Riedel, Randy Rainbow, Crystal Demure, Countess Luann de Lesseps, Judy Gold, and Randy Jones. The roast which was produced by Daniel DeMello and directed by Rachel Klein, and introduced by Rosie O'Donnell who doubled the amount raised at the benefit.

== Awards ==
Vilanch has won two consecutive Emmy Awards for his writing of the Academy Award telecasts as well as an additional four Emmys for Outstanding Variety Show.

Vilanch has also been the recipient of a number of awards for his work in support of AIDS charities and LGBTQ rights charities:

- Los Angeles Shanti Foundation's Daniel P. Warner Service Award (1990)
- GLAAD Media's Stephen F. Kolzak Award (1997)
- Los Angeles Gay and Lesbian Center's Rand Schrader Distinguished Achievement Award (1998)
- Outfest Honors Award for contributions to gay and lesbian visibility (2002)
- AIDS Project Los Angeles Hero Award (2003)

== Appearance ==
Vilanch is known for his trademark look, which features long blonde hair (with or without a beard), distinctive glasses frequently with brightly colored frames, and his collection of double entendre-themed T-shirts. He has often joked that, for years, he was compared to a Wookiee, especially after co-writing the Star Wars Holiday Special.

== Bibliography ==
- Vilanch, Bruce (2000). Bruce!: My Adventures in the Skin Trade and Other Essays. Tarcher. ISBN 978-1585420469.
- Vilanch, Bruce (2025). It Seemed Like a Bad Idea at the Time. Chicago Review Press. ISBN 978-0914091929.
