= Michael Stokes (photographer) =

American photographer (born 1963)

- Born: 1963 (age 62–63); Berkeley, California
- Education: California State University, Long Beach
- Known for: Photography
- Website: michaelstokes.net

Michael Stokes (born 1963) is an American photographer, best known for his photographs of veterans who were wounded in Iraq and Afghanistan and male figure photographs. He has published several coffee table books of his fine art nude photography and from his large collection of vintage photographs.

== Early life ==
Stokes grew up in Berkeley, California and graduated with a Fine Art degree through the film department at California State University, Long Beach. He wrote and directed the short film, Alien (1992).

== Career ==
In 2012, Stokes published his first hardcover male figure study book, Masculinity, which included photographs of the late French singer, actor, and model Quentin Elias.

While working on Always Loyal, Stokes told The Huffington Post that his interest in war veterans came about after meeting United States Marine Corps veteran and amputee-turned-fitness model Alex Minsky. "I had already studied as many amputee photos that I could find. I noticed that most of them emphasized the lost limb, and that the mood was often sorrowful. That was not the vibe I was getting from him, so I decided to simply photograph him as if he were not an amputee, photograph him exactly the same way I would any of my fitness models."

In 2014, a special signed limited edition printing of Bare Strength helped raise $20,000 for the Semper Fi Fund, a charity that assists injured veterans and their families.

For over a decade, Michael Stokes had been gathering a vast collection of over 500 vintage photographs of military men, mostly nude, when he signed a contract with editor Dian Hanson to have them published in 2014 under the title My Buddy – World War II Laid Bare. In 2020, Stokes published My Naked Soldier: A Study of Nudity in the Armed Forces WWI – WWII with more vintage photographs.

In 2016, Stokes released Invictus, in which his sexy photographs of 15 amputee veterans "flaunt[ed] prosthetics and rock-hard abs in a bold celebration of their post-war bodies."

=== Facebook controversy ===
Stokes challenged Facebook's moderation policy after a photo was removed from his public page. The photo in question, of Minsky nude but covering his penis with an athletic cup, was deleted in February 2013 by the social network, who claimed it violated their ban on nudity. In protest, more than 4,000 of Stokes' followers shared the photograph and made it their profile picture. After Stokes questioned the photo's removal in various media outlets, the photo was reinstated and Stokes received an apology stating that the removal was an error.

In December 2013, Facebook again removed the same photo of Minsky from Stokes' page, saying it violated their Community Standards, and banned the photographer's page for 30 days.

In January 2015, Stokes was locked out of his Facebook account and told that his personal page and his professional one were to be merged for violating the network's policy of discussing work on his personal page, a claim Stokes adamantly denied. After an appeal, Stokes' two pages were not merged and he was once again granted access to both. After still more photos were removed, Stokes questioned why Facebook permitted ESPN to post nude athletes with full buttocks showing while he couldn't show a nude man shot from the side with nothing revealed. In protest, fans of Stokes began reporting the more revealing photos on ESPN's page, but Facebook declined to remove them or ban the sports network. At this point, Stokes told The Advocate, "we concluded that one way you can post male nudes on Facebook is if you are a big brand or if you advertise on Facebook."

In July 2015, Facebook issued Stokes a warning after he posted a photo called "Mary, The Venus," which depicts topless female Army veteran and amputee Mary Dague. In an interview with The Independent UK, Stokes said he believed the photo would be acceptable because it shows breast scarring, which Facebook does not prohibit. Two months later, Stokes was banned from the site for 30 days after posting a photo from his book Masculinity that showed a man nude from the side, lighting a cigarette. The photo was later reinstated and Stokes received an apology but not an explanation.

Stokes believed the sudden reversal was prompted by a media request from The Independent UK, who had asked Facebook to publicly comment on the removal. When the photo was removed a second time shortly after its reinstatement, Stokes tried to contact Facebook's PR department but received no response.

Stokes criticized Facebook's moderation by saying "We’re allowed to see Angora rabbits stripped of their fur live, but we can’t see a man nude from the side."

== Published works ==
- Masculinity (2012). Bruno Gmünder. ISBN 9783867874281
- Bare strength (2014). Bruno Gmünder. ISBN 9783867877688
- My Buddy – World War II Laid Bare (2014), photographs from Michael Stokes collection. Taschen. ISBN 9783836547963
- Always loyal (2015). Bruno Gmünder. ISBN 9783959850148
- Exhibition (2015). Bruno Gmünder. ISBN 9783959850131
- Adonis Blue (2016). Sebastian Publishing. ISBN 9780997453522
- Invictus (2016). Sebastian Publishing. ISBN 9780997453515
- Divine Eros (2019). Sebastian Publishing. ISBN 9780997453553
- Deconstructed (2019). Sebastian Publishing. ISBN 9780997453577
- My Naked Soldier: A Study of Nudity in the Armed Forces WWI – WWII (2020). Sebastian Publishing. ISBN 9780997453591
- Sinner or Saint (2020). Sebastian Publishing. ISBN 9780997453584
- Michael Stokes Photography 2021 (2021). Sebastian Publishing. ISBN 9781735599601
