= Alex Minsky =

- Born: Alexander Minsky; November 7, 1988 (age 37); Mission Viejo, Orange County, California, United States
- Military career
- Allegiance: United States of America
- Branch: United States Marine Corps
- Service years: 2008–2010
- Rank: Corporal
- Unit: 2nd Battalion 3rd Marines
- Conflicts: Global War on Terrorism: Operation Enduring Freedom; War in Afghanistan (WIA)
- Awards: Purple Heart; Navy Achievement Medal

Alex Minsky is a retired Marine corporal and now a model. At the beginning of his first tour of Afghanistan in 2009, his Humvee hit a roadside bomb and his right leg was amputated. He spent 47 days in a coma with a traumatic brain injury and 17 months in total in a hospital. After his brother died from a drug overdose, he entered a 23-month period of alcohol abuse, and to get out of it, he turned to physical fitness. It was during one of his routine workouts that he was approached by a fashion photographer named Tom Cullis. However, his career did not start to take off until he was photographed nearly nude by the Los Angeles photographer Michael Stokes.

== Personal life ==
He grew up in Mission Viejo, Orange County, California. Alex is the oldest of four siblings. Minsky is 5′10″, weighs 165 lbs and has a 32" waist. He married in 2018.

== Awards ==
Purple Heart, 2009.
