= Parlour Club =

Coordinates: 34.0831°N 118.3477°W

The Parlour Club was a venue located on Santa Monica Boulevard in West Hollywood, California and managed by Andrew Gould. Among its notable events included the speakeasy-themed night Bricktops (established by Vaginal Davis), series of spoken-word sessions The Unhappy Hour (created by Lydia Lunch with Andrew Gould), and performance art night Touché (created by Clint Catalyst).

== Notable performers and hosts ==
- Lydia Lunch
- Shawna Kenney
- Pleasant Gehman
- Clint Catalyst
- Jake La Botz
- Vaginal Davis
- Mary Woronov
- Velvet Hammer
