= Saint Paul Preparatory School =

St. Paul Preparatory School
- 380 Jackson St, Saint Paul, MN; United States

Information
- Type: Private, Coeducational, Non-denominational
- Motto: A World Class Education. Literally.
- Established: 2003
- Head of school: John Belpedio
- Faculty: ~35
- Enrollment: ~270 (2016-2017) (approx. 95% international)
- Classes: 14 AP courses
- Average class size: 3-22
- Student to teacher ratio: 1:15
- Colors: Navy Blue, Orange, and White
- Tuition: ~$10,500 (domestic students), Varies (international students) (financial aid up to 50%)
- Website: www.stpaulprep.org

St. Paul Preparatory School, formerly known as Nacel International School, is a private college school in Saint Paul, Minnesota, United States. It is also a part of the Nacel International School System. Founded in 2003 by US-based student exchange organization Nacel Open Door, it recruits students from more than 50 countries worldwide. All international students are placed in host families, where they will live for five to ten month periods while the school is in session.

The enrollment at St. Paul Preparatory School resides from more than 50 countries.

Host families from the metropolitan Twin Cities provide housing for the international students who attend the school. These host families provide shelter, food, and transportation while supporting the study habits of the students and offering an understanding of the American way of life. Students are provided an unlimited metro/bus pass to commute to and from school and visit local attractions such as the Mall of America.

In 2014, St. Paul Preparatory School founded three diploma programs in STEM, Visual Arts, and International Business.

The 'Visual Arts Program' diploma includes a rigorous product oriented portfolio that students develop for public presentation and sale. Students produce artistic creations derived from current inspirational motivation for competition, public display, and commercial marketing.

The 'International Business Program' diploma provides the skills and knowledge necessary to understand, develop, and discuss economic concepts from a micro and macro level. In depth finance concepts of managing and operating a business, as well as hands-on learning through internship based opportunities, provide an exciting and interesting first hand view of the capitalist system.

In 2015, a fourth diploma program was added. The 'Global Leadership Program' combines the communication skills needed for oral argument, speech communications, and problem-solving skills to emphasize leadership and issue-oriented critical thinking.

The school is organized around the diploma programs that provide a focus for the education of all students. Many students attend the school for one year and not able to participate in the diploma programs due to graduation requirements.

== Branch campuses ==
After opening St. Paul Preparatory School in 2003, Nacel International School System opened up other campuses around the world for schools modeled after its St. Paul Preparatory school.

Its branch schools are located in China (Saint Paul American School), South Korea (Saint Paul International School), Philippines, Vietnam, Turkey and France(Notre-Dame International High School). A sister school is located in Poland.
