= Alliage (band) =

French boy band

- Origin: France
- Genres: Pop, Europop
- Years active: 1996–2000
- Past members: Steven Gunnell; Roman Lata Ares; Brian Torres; Quentin Elias

Alliage was a French boy band active from 1996 to 2000.

== History ==
Alliage was assembled during the 1990s boy band craze. The musical group was met with the most commercial success in France alongside fellow boy acts like Worlds Apart, 2Be3 and G-Squad. The band included four young men; Steven Gunnell, Roman Lata Ares, Brian Torres and lead singer Quentin Elias. Alliage, whose name translates as "mixture," was marketed as a multicultural fusion of several different ethnic origins: Corsican, Spanish, American, and Algerian-French, respectively. Some of their songs were "alliages" of several languages such as "Baila" and "Lucy".

The group's breakthrough hit was their first single "Baila" ("Dance, I love you, your memory still follows me") which sold more than 450,000 copies. Their first album titled Alliage, l'album was released in 1997, selling more than 500,000 copies. At the peak of their success, Alliage collaborated with Irish boy band Boyzone on "Te garder près de moi" and Swedish band Ace of Base on "Cruel Summer".

== Break up and later ==
By the end of the 1990s Alliage's record sales declined as boy bands fell out of favor with the public.

Quentin Elias was the first to leave the group and embark on a solo career in 1999. Elias was based in New York City. He remained active as a recording artist, model and actor in films, television and theater until his sudden death in 2014.

Gunnell also become soloist and recorded an album of Catholic music called In terra, having rediscovered his creed and passion for the opera.

Ares began a career in photography and became the editor of the Spanish edition of V Magazine. Torres became a male model and actor.

== Discography ==
=== Albums ===
Year	Album	Charts		Notes
Year	Album	BEL Wa	FR	Notes
1997	Alliage, l'album	23	9	Track list: 1. "Te garder près de moi" (3:58); 2. "Baila" (3:59); 3. "Lucy" (4:00); 4. "Comme 1 refrain" (3:55); 5. "Premier rendez-vous" (3:58); 6. "Je sais" (4:11); 7. "Stay (J'ai tant besoin de toi)" (3:22); 8. "Sunny" (3:24); 9. "Le temps qui court" (3:40); 10. "Tu rêves encore (Don't Slow Down)" (3:55); 11. "Rien qu'une nuit" (3:55); 12. "Love Is All Around" (Live) (4:09); 13. "Everything I Do, I Do It For You" (live) (4:14); 14. "I Need You" (Live) (4:13); 15. "La Isla Bonita" (Live) (3:15); 16. "Holiday" (Live) (3:43); 17. "Te garder près de moi" (version Française) (3:58)
1998	Musics	–	–	Track list: 1. "Cruel Summer" feat. Ace of Base (3:27); 2. "Tu es partie (Julia Says)" (4:02); 3. "Je l'aime à mourir" (2:51); 4. "Merci" (3:44); 5. "Ce soir" (4:18); 6. "Quand la nuit résonne" (2:40); 7. "Crazy" (3:45); 8. "T'aimer" (3:35); 9. "My Heart Goes Boom" (3:28); 10. "Dans un délire de fièvre" (3:51); 11. "J'ai changé" (3:34); 12. "A Little Bit (Of Love and Devotion)" (3:20); 13. "Si tu t'en vas (I Can't Get You Out of My Mind)" (4:00)

=== Singles ===
Year	Single	Charts		Notes / Certification	Album
Year	Single	BEL	FR	Notes / Certification	Album
1996	"Baïla"	22	2		Alliage, l'album
1997	"Lucy"	31	4		Alliage, l'album
1997	"Le temps qui court"	31	4	(French version of "Could It Be Magic")	Alliage, l'album
1997	"Te garder près de moi" (Alliage and Boyzone)	3	3	Bilingual French/English version of "Working My Way Back to You")	Alliage, l'album
1998	"Je sais"	27	22		Alliage, l'album
1998	"Cruel Summer" (Alliage and Ace of Base)	–	24	Mixed English and French version of "Cruel Summer"	Musics
1998	"Je l'aime à mourir"	39	30	Cover of Francis Cabrel song	Musics
1999	"My Heart Goes Boom"	–	–		Musics
2000	"Ce soir"	–	–		Musics
2000	"lève-toi"	–	–		
