= Brent Calderwood =

American journalist

Brent Calderwood reading at Georgia Center for the Book event

Brent Calderwood is an American author and journalist. He was named by Out magazine in the magazine’s annual “Out 100” issues, identifying important LGBT newsmakers in both 1995 and 2014. His writing and advocacy on behalf of LGBTQ youth is documented in the films The Butch Factor and Now We Can Dance: The Story of the Hayward Gay Prom, as well as the television program Lifestories with Gabrielle Carteris. His first book, The God of Longing, was recommended by the American Library Association in 2014 and is housed in the permanent collection of the Library of Congress.

== Journalism ==
Calderwood’s writing has included essays and op-ed articles, as well as profiles and interviews with artists such as director Guillermo del Toro, musician-composer David Amram, women’s music pioneer Holly Near, Harvey Milk photographer Daniel Nicoletta, painter Lenore Chinn, and the singer-songwriters Mary Lambert and Justin Vivian Bond. His work has been published in Rolling Stone, Out, the San Francisco Examiner, and Noir City magazine.

Calderwood began his journalism career in the San Francisco Bay Area in 1992 as cofounder of InsideOUT magazine, the first nationally distributed magazine for LGBT youth in the United States. As a result of local news coverage of the magazine and his own articles on LGBT youth issues, which were distributed to national newspapers by Pacific News Service, Calderwood became the target of antigay harassment, including vandalism and death threats. In the months following those events, he was invited to speak on the syndicated program Lifestories with Gabrielle Carteris; other guests on the episode, which focused on violence toward LGBT youth, included Mary Griffith, mother of Bobby Griffith, as well as friends and associates of Brandon Teena.

For Calderwood’s activism and writing, he was the only LGBT youth included in the 1995 "OUT 100" issue of Out magazine. A large format two-page comic strip that Calderwood illustrated and wrote, titled “Memoirs from a Closet", was recognized as culturally significant by GLAAD and is still used in classrooms to educate students on homophobia and diversity. Calderwood also lobbied in Sacramento during the 1995-1996 legislative session for AB101, sponsored by Sheila Kuehl, the first Assembly Bill in California to explicitly prohibit discrimination against LGBT students; the bill was eventually passed as AB222, the Freedom for All Students Act, and was signed into law as AB537 in 2000.

== Literary work ==
Calderwood, a member of the National Book Critics Circle, has served as a judge for those awards as well as the Lambda Literary Awards in poetry and YA fiction. He was the literary editor for Art & Understanding (A&U) magazine from 2011 to 2016; during that time, he cofounded the international Christopher Hewitt Awards in poetry, fiction, and drama, naming the award for the magazine’s original literary editor. Since 2013, the awards have been given to writers from Africa, Asia, South America, Europe, and North America. Calderwood has also been a guest editor for the poetry journals Assaracus, Locuspoint, and The Squaw Valley Review.

In addition to the collected poems in The God of Longing, Calderwood’s poetry and essays appear in dozens of anthologies and journals including The Southern Poetry Anthology, The Gay & Lesbian Review Worldwide, and Gathered Light: The Poetry of Joni Mitchell’s Songs (an essay anthology published with participation from Mitchell in which notable poets such as Cornelius Eady and Kim Addonizio each write about the prosody and literary merits of the lyrics of an individual Mitchell song).

Calderwood also writes and performs music; he plays guitar and sings an original song in the documentary The Butch Factor.
