= It Seemed Like a Bad Idea at the Time =

2025 memoir by Bruce Vilanch

- Author: Bruce Vilanch
- Language: English
- Genre: Memoir
- Published: March 4, 2025
- Publisher: Chicago Review Press
- Publication place: United States
- Media type: Print, ebook
- Pages: 256 pages
- ISBN: 978-0914091929

It Seemed Like a Bad Idea at the Time is a 2025 memoir written by Bruce Vilanch about his involvement in writing some of the worst projects in television and entertainment history.

In It Seems Like a Bad Idea at the Time Vilanch dishes on such subjects as being hired by Grease producer Allan Carr and later fired to write the first draft of the screenplay for the 1980 Village People musical Can't Stop the Music, reminiscing about actor Paul Lynde of Hollywood Squares and 1976's The Paul Lynde Halloween Special co-starring the rock band Kiss.

Vilanch also writes about his relationship with fame and the development of various creative endeavors. He discusses co-writing the disastrous Star Wars Holiday Special , his writing on several awards shows including 25 Academy Awards broadcasts, working on flops like The Brady Bunch Hour, the Donny and Marie show, where much of the production crew was gay, The Star Wars Holiday Special and The Paul Lynde Halloween Special and a sitcom with the performer Charo among others.

== Reviews ==
Kirkus Reviews called Vilanch's memoir "A well-written treat for fans of show-biz gossip."

The Washington Post wrote “It Seemed Like a Bad Idea at the Time,” is targeted to a specific demographic. In this case, the target in question is “gay and nerdy”.
