= The Butch Factor =

- Theatrical release poster
- Directed by: Christopher Hines
- Produced by: Christopher Hines
- Cinematography: Christopher Hines
- Edited by: Christopher Hines, Andy Jones, Bil Yoelin
- Music by: Laura Karpman (original music); Shannon Halwes (music editor)
- Release date: 2009
- Running time: 87 minutes
- Country: United States
- Language: English

The Butch Factor: What Kind of Man Are You? is a 2009 documentary film produced and directed by American director Christopher Hines through his own production company Rogue Culture Inc. The film, narrated by Hines, was filmed at various locations including Atlanta, Georgia, Los Angeles, San Francisco and Guerneville, California, and Seattle, Washington, and was shown at gay and documentary festivals. The television premiere was April 17, 2010, on the gay channel Logo.

Christopher Hines followed up The Butch Factor with the documentary The Adonis Factor (2010).

== Synopsis ==
The documentary tackles meanings of masculinity in gay men and culture through interviews with a great number of diverse gay men mixed with fast-paced sometimes archival tour of diverse groups of gay males from 1970s to contemporary times, with "eye candy" shots of men as well as analytical and expert presentations from writers, teachers, psychologists about their views of gay culture, masculinity, fetishism, discrimination, etc. It discusses how gay "butch" men often feel alone in their effort to integrate in general gay life as masculine males. Discussions include the butch gay stereotypes of leather men, bears, rodeo riders, muscle men, construction workers, truck drivers, policemen, sportsmen, and others, intertwined with questions of homophobia, stereotyping, metrosexuality, effeminacy, and fashion.

== Cast ==
(All appearing as themselves)

- Christopher Hines as Narrator
- J. Wesley Adams (credited as Wes Adams)
- David Aguilar
- H.T. Bennett
- Jackson Bowman
- Ellen Brin
- Junior Buendia
- Brent Calderwood
- Vincent Calvarese (San Francisco Sheriff)
- John Campbell
- Gregory Cason
- Eric Chinchilla
- Dan Cullinane
- Steven Daigle
- Colin Daly
- Durk Dehner
- Allen Eggman
- Brian Garrison
- Larry Gross
- Mike Gunn
- Keith Harris
- Jason Hefley (commissioner of the San Diego American Flag Football League and construction worker)
- Trevor Hoppe
- Dalph Johnson
- Doug Komlenic
- Matt Laird
- Harry Lit
- Jaimes Loughrey
- Jack Malebranche
- Rich McMurray
- Peter Nardi
- Marcus Nunn
- Chris Ohnesorge (credited as Chriso)
- Wing Poon
- Jim Reed
- Kevin Reed
- Don Romesburg—archivist
- Cory Smith
- Mark Snyder
- Kelly Stahr
- Steve Sublet
- Ron Wear
- Wes Wilkinson
- Frank Yanez
- Bil Yoelin

== Screenings ==
- Frameline Film Festival - San Francisco
- Austin Gay and Lesbian Film Festival
- Reel Affirmations - Washington D.C.
- Out on Film - Atlanta1
- Image Out - Rochester
- Pittsburgh Lesbian & Gay Film Festival
- Tampa International Gay & Lesbian Film Festival
- Image+Nation - Montreal
- Seattle Lesbian and Gay Film Festival
- Cinema Diverse-Palm Springs
- Mezipatra - Prague
- Les Gai Cine Mad - Madrid
- Vancouver Queer Film Festival
