= The Adonis Factor =

- Theatrical release poster
- Directed by: Christopher Hines
- Produced by: Christopher Hines
- Cinematography: Christopher Hines
- Release date: June 19, 2010 (Frameline)
- Country: United States
- Language: English

The Adonis Factor is a 2010 documentary film produced and directed by American director Christopher Hines through his own production company Rogue Culture Inc. Filmed at various locations, it was shown at a number of gay and documentary festivals. The television premiere was April 2, 2011 on the gay channel Logo.

Christopher Hines' The Adonis Factor is a follow-up to another, The Butch Factor, that tackled gay culture and masculinity.

== Synopsis ==
Hines' film examines issues of body image in the gay community.

== Cast ==
(All appearing as themselves)

- Anthony O'Brien - Law enforcement officer
- Shane Stiel - Disc Jockey / Producer
- Graig Keyte - Interior Designer
- Mike Wood - Instinct Editor in chief
- Bruce Vilanch - Writer and actor
- Anderson Davis - Actor and model
- John Ganun - Photographer.
- Quentin Elias - Singer, model
- Dr Gregory Cason - Psychologist
- Dr Tim Jochen - Dermatologist
- Justin Gaines - Bartender and student
- Richard Klein - Go-Go dancer
- Derek Brocklehurst - interviewee
- Justin Donahue - interviewee
- Eric Pyne - Urban body fitness trainer
- Neil Samarripa - Urban body fitness trainer
- Juan Pablo Zuluaga - Former "Mr Hot Atlanta"
- Scott Cullens - Company director
- Jeffrey Sanker - Party promoter
- Melvin Myles - Party Participant
- Dr Scott Parry - Steroid abuse advisor
- Gabriel Perez
- Deandre Johnson
- Nic Delis
- Jallen Rix - Sexologist.
- Brian Mills - Titan Men director
- Christopher Saint - Titan model
- Dakota Rivers - Titan model
- Darren Main - Naked yoga instructor
- Steve Waye - Naked yoga student
- Fred Goldsmith - Community initiative
- Rick Esparza - Ice hockey player.
- Clint Catalyst - model
- Stacey Hummell - Make-up artist
- Ryan May
- Jonathan Miller
- Jeff Pray - Proud Bears
- Michael Sigmann - Men's Inner Journey
- John Moore and Ryan Cummings - Life Partners
- Dr Derek Jones - Dermatologist
- Dr Greg Mueller - Plastic Surgeon
- Albert Wyss - Former cover model

== Screenings ==
- Frameline Film Festival, San Francisco—World Premiere
- Queer Doc Festival, Sydney, Australia
- Oslo Gay & Lesbian Film Festival
- Out on Film, Atlanta, Georgia
- Tampa International Gay & Lesbian Film FestivaI
- ImageOut: Rochester LGBT Film and Video Festival
- Seattle LGBT Film Festival
- Southwest Gay and Lesbian Festival,
- Indianapolis Gay Film Festival
- Image+Nation, Montreal
- Festival Mix Brazil
- Brisbane, Australia Queer Film Festival
