= Gyeongin =

Korean term for Seoul–Incheon corridor

- Hangul: 경인
- Hanja: 京仁
- RR: Gyeongin
- MR: Kyŏngin

The name Gyeongin refers to the Seoul–Incheon corridor in South Korea, and is used as a name for the Gyeongin railway line, the Gyeongin Expressway, and the Gyeongin Canal (which was completed in 2011 and is now called the Arabaetgil Canal), all of which link Seoul—the South Korean capital and largest city—to nearby Incheon—the second-largest port and fourth-largest city. The name "Gyeongin" is formed from the character meaning capital city and the first character"Incheon."

== See also ==
- Transportation in South Korea
