= Doggie Adventure =

1989 short film meant to entertain dogs

Doggie Adventure is a VHS video made to entertain dogs. Shot in 1989 in Minneapolis, Minnesota, the 24-minute video was produced and directed by Harley Toberman and his wife, Kim Wood, at a cost of about $15,000. The video was shot using a steadicam camera mount at approximately 2 feet (0.61 m) above the ground, ostensibly emulating a dog's point of view. During the video, the unseen canine protagonist accompanies its owner, played by Wood, as she goes about various daily errands. The soundtrack consists of natural sounds and dialogue, without voice-over narration. A press campaign described as "aggressive" resulted in media coverage of the novelty video in Time magazine, Newsweek, and the Today Show.

Reviews of the video were mixed. Andy Wickstrom of the Chicago Tribune found it an entertaining novelty, calling it "nothing but delightful." Ed Condran of The Philadelphia Inquirer was similarly impressed, and reported that his dog "followed the action as if it were the seventh game of the World Series." Dave Barry of the Miami Herald was less effusive in his syndicated column, noting that his dogs, apparently possessed of "higher entertainment standards than [us]...totally ignored Doggie Adventure."

The movie also won 2 awards at the New York International Film Festival - A Bronze and Silver for Sound Design and Original Score by The Client Brothers.

Years later, the movie has been made into a DVD available on Amazon. It also has many extras such as - director's commentary, music tracks, trivia game, and -a first for a DVD - audio tracks that you can switch between source sound and final mix.
