= Nacel Open Door =

Nacel Open Door, Inc. (NOD) is a nonprofit student exchange organization dedicated to international understanding and language education.

== Purpose ==
Nacel Open Door, Inc. (NOD) is dedicated to promoting international understanding and language education. NOD believes it is essential for young people to develop a deeper awareness of their role as citizens of the world, through direct experience in other cultures and languages, usually through homestays.

== History ==
NOD was formed in April 1997 by the merger of Nacel Cultural Exchanges and Open Door Student Exchange. Nacel Cultural Exchanges was founded in France by language teachers in 1957, and homestay exchanges with the U.S. began in 1969. Open Door Student Exchange was founded in 1964 to provide intercultural learning opportunities to high school students and their families.

== Structure ==
The Nacel Open Door National Office is located in St. Paul, Minnesota. There are roughly 25 Regional Coordinators assisted by more than 200 Local Representatives who organize the programs on the state and local levels. NOD also employs both full-time and part-time employees to administer programs worldwide.

NOD is a member of Nacel International, a group of partner organizations that promote Nacel programs worldwide.

== Affiliations ==
Nacel Open Door is listed by the Council on Standards for International Educational Travel (CSIET) and is designated by the U.S. Department of State (formerly the USIA) as a J-1 visa Exchange Visitor Program Sponsor for the Academic Year Program.

== Programs ==
=== Academic Year Program (AYP) ===
Nacel Open Door offers opportunities for families across the United States to host an international exchange student from one of the more than 35 countries with which Nacel Open Door works. AYP accepts foreign students ages 15 to 18 to live with a host family and attend high school in the host family's community for a semester, academic year or calendar year. English language proficiency is required. Orientation is provided prior to leaving home, as well as after arriving in the U.S.

Students and host families receive support from a trained and experienced Local Representative, who in turn is supported by an Area Coordinator and the Twin Cities-based National Office.

=== Private School Program (PSP) ===
The Private School Program (PSP) gives private high schools in the United States the opportunity to welcome qualified international students to their campuses. These students, who come on an F-1 visa, stay with host families in the schools' communities and come with the goal of graduating from an American high school. These students typically come to the U.S. for more than one year (though not always to the same host family), and most hope to go on to attend an American college or university.

PSP students and host families are also supported by Local Representatives, who in turn are supported by Directors and the National Office.

=== Short Term Programs (STP) ===
Nacel Open Door offers the opportunity for families in the United States to host a student for 2–8 weeks. These students typically come from France, Spain, Germany, and Mexico.

Host families should be aware that students have no activities or planned activities. Instead, students expect host families to provide all entertainment throughout the duration of the program.

=== Congress-Bundestag Youth Exchange (CBYX) ===
Through joint funding from the U.S. Congress and the German Bundestag, a total of 25 scholarships are available to graduating high school seniors in the United States to spend one year in Germany. Students live with a host family, participate in a training or school program, and take part in an internship with a German company.

To be eligible to apply, students must:

- be U.S. citizens
- graduate from high school in January or June of the year in which they plan to participate
- be between 18-19 years of age
- have a "B" (3.0) G.P.A.
- be highly recommended by their school
- demonstrate leadership ability and willingness to serve as a young ambassador of the United States

=== St. Paul Preparatory School (SPP) ===
St. Paul Preparatory School (SPP) is the original high school within the Nacel International School System. Established in 2003, SPP is an international high school located in downtown St. Paul, Minn. Students from more than 25 countries, including the United States, attend SPP. SPP is accredited by the North Central Association.

The Nacel International School System also has branch schools in South Korea, China, France, Vietnam, and the Philippines, as well as a partnership with a school in Poland.

== Hosting a student ==
Most Nacel Open Door programs are based in homestay experiences, in which international students stay with a host family in the United States.

=== How to Host ===
The Nacel Open Door host family screening process is based on Department of State regulations, CSIET standards, and Nacel Open Door best practices to ensure student safety. In order to host with NOD, a family must be willing to participate in all screening processes. All host family members ages 18 and older must complete a criminal background check, and a home visit is required to ensure student safety.

==== Host families choose a program type and duration ====
- Academic Programs: Public and private schools; one-semester or year-long
- Short Term Programs: Summer and winter; 2–8 weeks

==== Host families provide ====
- Room, board, and a safe environment
- Loving parental guidance

==== NOD students come to the U.S. with their own ====
- Spending money
- Medical insurance

=== Application Process ===
1. An interested family completes the online Host Family Application.
2. A Local Representative contacts the family to complete the screening process, which includes a home visit.
3. Once the family is fully vetted, the Local Representative assists the family with selecting the student who best matches the family's interests.
4. Nacel Open Door facilitates school acceptance for students on academic programs. Once school acceptance is secured, NOD sends the host family's information to the Foreign Partner in the student's home country. At that time, the family may begin communicating directly with the student.
