= San Diego Humane Society =

Animal shelter in California, United States

- Established: 1880
- Type: Nonprofit
- Headquarters: Central Campus; 5500 Gaines Street; San Diego, CA 92110
- Location: San Diego, California, United States
- Website: sdhumane.org

San Diego Humane Society is a nonprofit, open-admission animal shelter in San Diego, California, and a national leader in animal welfare. Its mission is to create a more humane San Diego by inspiring compassion, providing hope and advancing the welfare of animals and people. The organization's innovative signature programs save thousands of lives each year and helped San Diego become the largest city in the U.S. to achieve zero euthanasia of healthy or treatable shelter animals in 2015.

San Diego Humane Society provides animal services for 14 cities in San Diego County, with campuses in San Diego, El Cajon, Escondido, Oceanside, and Ramona. It is an open-admission shelter with zero euthanasia for healthy and treatable shelter animals. Across five campuses, the organization cares for more than 40,000 pets and wildlife annually and shares their expertise with shelters nationwide.

San Diego Humane Society is a private, independent, nonprofit organization that is not affiliated with any other humane society or society for the prevention of cruelty to animals.

== History ==
San Diego Humane Society was organized on March 10, 1880, by George W. Marston and George W. Hazzard, and is the oldest and largest humane society in San Diego County. In 1934, the organization signed a contract with the City of San Diego to operate a shelter under the supervision of the County Department of Health. In 1951, the first animals were moved to the original site, located on Sherman Street (formerly a milk plant).

In 2003, San Diego Humane Society moved into its new buildings on Gaines Street, where the San Diego Campus has been located ever since. Through merger agreements, they absorbed the former North County Humane Society & SPCA in Oceanside, California, in 2010, and the Escondido Humane Society in Escondido, California, in 2014.

In 2014, San Diego Humane Society merged with PAWS San Diego, to expand programs that help pet owners keep their pets, making this the largest pet safety net service in San Diego. Later that year, San Diego Humane Society merged with Project Wildlife, the primary local resource for animal rehabilitation, conservation and wildlife education.

In 2015, San Diego Humane Society and the San Diego Animal Welfare Coalition announced that San Diego County reached zero euthanasia for healthy and treatable animals. After working for more than a decade to manage the county's homeless animal population and increase opportunities for pet adoptions, this achievement made San Diego the largest city in the U.S. to reach this goal, and the commitment to "Stay at Zero" has remained ever since.

In 2018, San Diego Humane Society opened the Pilar & Chuck Bahde Center for Shelter Medicine—the first of its kind in California. The hospital offers comprehensive shelter medicine to homeless pets and serves as a teaching hospital to train the shelter veterinarians of tomorrow. The following year, San Diego Humane Society expanded its Project Wildlife program and opened the Pilar & Chuck Bahde Wildlife Center in 2019.

In 2020, San Diego Humane Society welcomed its Ramona Campus. The former Fund for Animals Wildlife Center in Ramona had been part of the Humane Society of the United States for more than two decades. With this new 13-acre Ramona Wildlife Center, the work of Project Wildlife expanded to protect and care for more injured and orphaned wildlife throughout Southern California, including native apex predators such as bears, coyotes and birds of prey. The Ramona Wildlife Center is the only place in San Diego County that can care for and rehabilitate native apex predators.

Later in 2020, San Diego Humane Society opened the El Cajon Campus, taking over the management of the El Cajon Animal Shelter. With this fifth campus, they began caring for animals in East County San Diego, serving three more cities—El Cajon, La Mesa and Santee.

In January 2021, California Governor Gavin Newsom signed Bella's Act (Assembly Bill 2152) in September 2020 to go into law on January 1 to prohibit the retail sales of dogs, cats and rabbits in California. This is the first bill San Diego Humane Society sponsored. AB 2152, written by California State Assemblymember Todd Gloria (D-San Diego), puts an end to a supply of animals who have been bred and raised in unhealthy and inhumane conditions in out-of-state puppy mills.

In August 2022, San Diego Humane Society launched its Community Veterinary Program to address one of the greatest challenges in animal welfare today: access to affordable veterinary care. The program offers low-cost basic veterinary care for animals whose families may not otherwise be able to afford treatment—keeping pets healthy and out of shelters.

In January 2024, San Diego Humane Society worked alongside the ASPCA and San Francisco SPCA to advocate for the passage of AB 1399, which was signed into law on January 1, 2024. The law allows veterinarians in California to establish a client-patient relationship through video technology, expanding access to care for pets across the state, especially in underserved and rural communities.

In February 2024, after two years of construction, San Diego Humane Society reopened its Adoptions Center at the San Diego Campus—a major milestone in the organization's commitment to animal welfare. The redesigned facility features upgraded animal habitats, expanded outdoor spaces and a welcoming lobby to improve animal well-being and the adoption experience.

In May 2025, San Diego Humane Society's Ramona Wildlife Center celebrated a world record as Hannah Shirley was officially crowned the oldest living pygmy hippopotamus in managed care at 51 years, 6 months and 2 days.

== Finances ==
San Diego Humane Society is a private, nonprofit organization that is funded through a combination of contract funding from cities for which they provide animal services, philanthropic contributions, grants, bequests, investments and fees for services (e.g. adoption fees). Currently, the organization has over 700 employees and more than 4,000 volunteers.

== Events ==
Fur Ball: San Diego Humane Society hosts an annual "Fur Ball," a dog-friendly formal event that raises critical funds for their lifesaving programs.

Walk for Animals: With two events in North County and San Diego, the Walk for Animals is a dog-friendly walk and community fundraiser.

Other annual events include a virtual Wildlife Baby Shower and Kitten Shower, as well as educational outreach events in the community.

== Signature Programs & Services ==
San Diego Humane Society Humane Law Enforcement
Agency overview
- Formed: 1880
- Jurisdiction: State of California
- Headquarters: 5500 Gaines St, San Diego, CA 92110
- Parent agency: San Diego Humane Society and SPCA
- Website: http://www.sdhumane.org

San Diego Humane Society's signature programs and services make them a pillar for animal welfare in San Diego and beyond.

The Behavior & Training program offers lifesaving support for animals who display shy/fearful or defensive behaviors, kennel stress or reactivity while in the shelter environment. Each campus has specialized Behavior & Training staff, in addition to the state-of-the-art Behavior Center at the San Diego Campus. Beyond caring for shelter pets, San Diego Humane Society also provides community training resources and support through public training classes and workshops, online training resources and one-on-one trainer consultations.

Established in 2009, San Diego Humane Society's Kitten Program cares for thousands of orphaned kittens each year. The Jim Lester Kitten Nursery & Foster Center was the first kitten nursery of its kind in the country. Today, it provides critical care for kittens aged under 8 weeks of age, engages hundreds of trained foster volunteers to provide 24-hour care in their own homes and offers a daycare space for fosters who need support.

Veterinary Medicine is a hallmark of San Diego Humane Society and an essential component of their lifesaving work. Whether it is a basic vaccination, a spay/neuter surgery or complicated orthopedic surgery, their highly skilled veterinary team is there to assist animals in need. Veterinary services are provided for shelter animals to prepare them for adoption and for wildlife to ready them to return to the wild. Their Pilar & Chuck Bahde Center for Shelter Medicine also serves as a teaching hospital for advancing the practice of shelter medicine and molding the shelter veterinarians of tomorrow.

San Diego Humane Society's Project Wildlife stands as the primary resource in San Diego County to rescue and rehabilitate injured, orphaned and ill wildlife. Every year, Project Wildlife cares for more than 10,000 wild animals—from bobcats and bears to squirrels and hummingbirds. Through nationally leading wildlife medicine and state of the art facilities, Project Wildlife gives these animals the best opportunity to survive.

The Humane Law Enforcement program protects animals throughout San Diego County by providing animal services and enforcing animal-related laws. Humane Officers are in the field seven days a week and can issue citations, make arrests, file criminal charges and serve warrants. They also respond and rescue animals in disaster situations in San Diego and surrounding areas. Each year, more than 100,000 calls for help are placed to San Diego Humane Society's dispatch.

San Diego Humane Society also offers Community Support Services for pet families in need. This critical safety net helps pets stay right where they belong—at home with the people who love them—even in times of hardship. Services include free pet food and supplies, low-cost veterinary care, pet care resources and more.
