= Christopher Hines =

American film director

Christopher Hines is an American documentary film director and a journalist

Hines started as a journalist in the San Francisco Bay Area, reporting on politics, business, education and military affairs for the Oakland Tribune and San Francisco Chronicle. Hines was an embedded journalist during the Iraq War and became an international correspondent reporting from Asia and the Middle East. He went on to produce news and cultural shows for CNN, as well as entertainment news shows for VH1, MTV, CMT and E! including E! True Hollywood Story (THS). He also launched investigative reporting shows most notably THS Investigates on various topics, including Inside the Mind of the Serial Killer, Love Behind Bars, Hot for Student, Deadly Waters and Plastic Surgery Nightmares.

Through his own production company Rogue Culture Inc., he developed a wide range of programming. His critically acclaimed documentary The Butch Factor was featured in a number of film festivals. He followed that up with the documentaries Loving Large, Legalize Gay, Long & Short of Body Hair, Gay Lives of Straight Guys, Gays in Prison, Bad Ass Gays, The Adonis Factor and Man 2 Man: A Gay Man’s Guide to Finding Love.

== Filmography ==
=== Director/producer ===
- 2009: The Butch Factor (documentary)
- 2010: The Adonis Factor (documentary)
- 2011: Man 2 Man: A Gay Man's Guide to Finding Love (documentary)
- 2011: Legalize Gay (documentary)

=== Producer ===
- 2004–2007: E! True Hollywood Story (documentaries). Several episodes: "Sharon Stone", "Laci Peterson" and "Dancing with the Stars"
- 2005–2008: THS Investigates. Several shows including: "Love Behind Bars", "Inside the Mind of a Serial Killer", "Plastic Surgery Nightmares", "Hot for Student", "Diet Fads"
