= Samantha Fox discography =

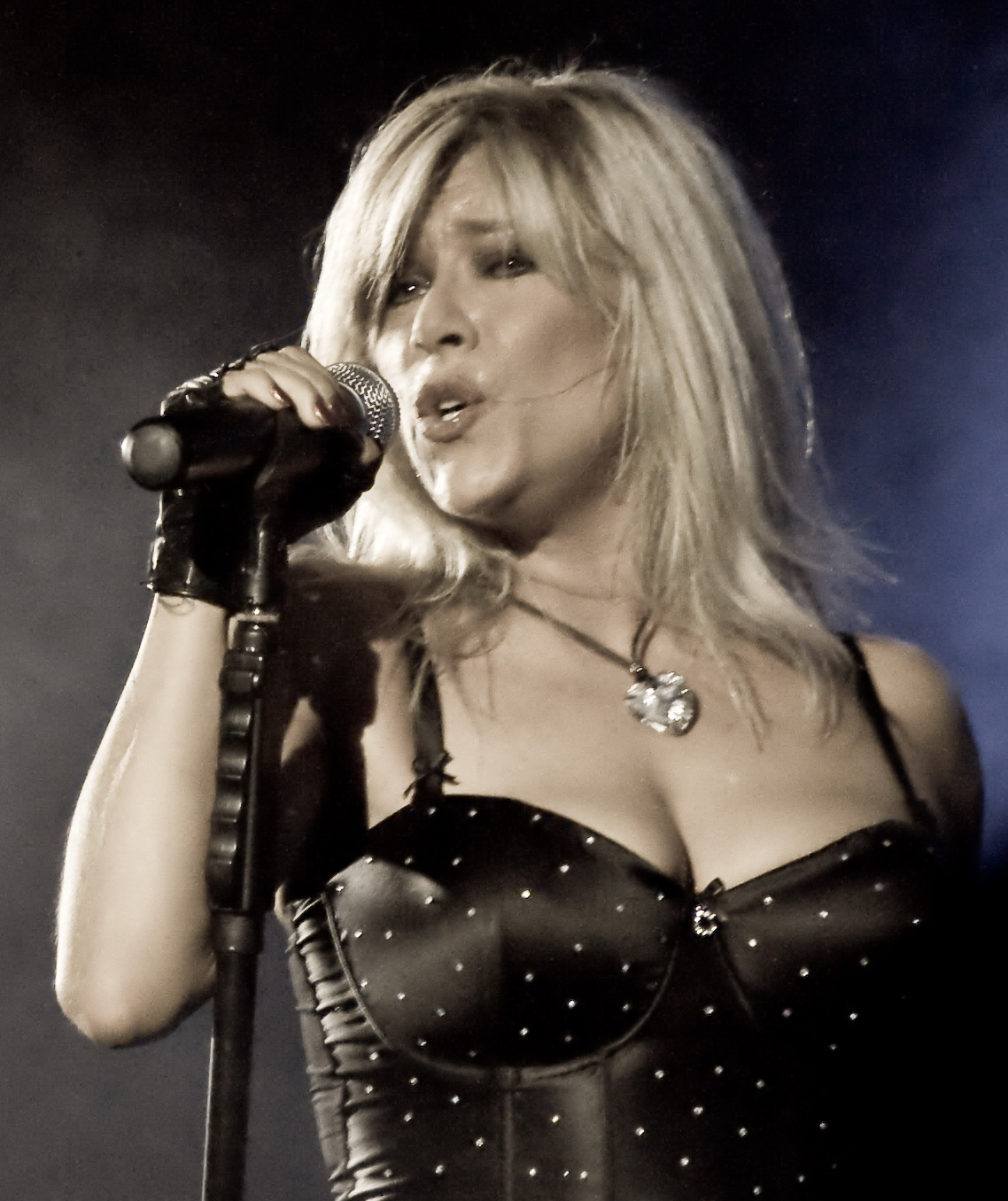
- Fox performing in Rescaldina, Italy, April 2009
- Studio albums: 6
- Compilation albums: 5
- Singles: 36
- Video albums: 6
- Music videos: 21
- Remix albums: 5
- Box sets: 2
- #1 Singles: 3

English singer Samantha Fox has released six studio albums, five compilation albums, five remix albums, two box sets, 36 singles (including four as a featured artist), six video albums, and 21 music videos.

== Albums ==
=== Studio albums ===
List of studio albums, with selected chart positions and certifications
Title	Details	Peak chart positions										Certifications
Title	Details	UK	AUS	CAN	FIN	GER	NLD	NOR	SWE	SWI	US	Certifications
Touch Me	Released: 7 July 1986; Label: Jive; Formats: CD, LP, cassette	17	20	7	1	9	67	3	5	4	24	BPI: Silver; GLF: Platinum; IFPI FIN: Platinum; IFPI NOR: Gold; IFPI SWI: Platinum; MC: 2× Platinum; RIAA: Gold
Samantha Fox	Released: 20 July 1987; Label: Jive; Formats: CD, LP, cassette	22	86	41	3	16	32	3	14	3	51	IFPI FIN: Diamond; IFPI NOR: Gold; IFPI SWI: Gold; MC: Platinum; RIAA: Gold
I Wanna Have Some Fun	Released: November 1988; Label: Jive; Formats: CD, LP, cassette	46	151	19	20	60	—	—	50	28	37	MC: 2× Platinum; RIAA: Gold
Just One Night	Released: 21 June 1991; Label: Jive; Formats: CD, LP, cassette	—	167	55	—	—	—	—	—	—	—	
21st Century Fox	Released: 6 October 1997; Label: Ichiban; Formats: CD, cassette	—	—	—	—	—	—	—	—	—	—	
Angel with an Attitude	Released: 18 October 2005; Label: La Chapelle; Formats: CD, digital download	—	—	—	—	—	—	—	—	—	—	
"—" denotes a recording that did not chart or was not released in that territory.

=== Compilation albums ===
Title	Details
Greatest Hits	Released: 14 September 1992; Label: Jive; Formats: CD, LP, cassette
Hot Tracks: The Best of Samantha Fox	Released: 7 March 2000; Label: BMG Special Products; Formats: CD, cassette
Watching You, Watching Me (as Sam Fox)	Released: 4 June 2002; Label: XIII Bis; Format: CD
Greatest Hits	Released: 14 December 2009; Label: Fox 2000, Sony; Formats: CD, digital download
Touch Me: The Best of Samantha Fox	Released: 6 October 2014; Label: Camden, Sony; Format: CD

=== Remix albums ===
Title	Details	Peaks
Title	Details	JPN
Sam's Collection	Released: 25 February 1987 (Japan only); Label: Jive; Formats: CD, 12-inch vinyl	—
"Sam" Thing Remixed	Released: 25 February 1988 (Japan only); Label: Jive; Formats: CD, LP	35
The Megamix Album	Released: 10 September 1988 (Japan only); Label: Jive; Formats: CD, LP	—
I Wanna Have More Fun (12″ Version Collection)	Released: 25 May 1989 (Japan only); Label: Jive; Formats: CD	—
12 Inch Collection	Released: 28 December 2004 (Japan only); Label: BMG, Jive; Format: CD	—
"—" denotes a recording that did not chart or was not released in that territory.

=== Box sets ===
Title	Details
Touch Me	Released: 8 September 2003; Label: Ariola Express; Formats: 3-CD, digital download
Play It Again, Sam: The Fox Box	Released: 28 July 2017; Label: Cherry Pop; Format: 2-CD + 2-DVD

== Singles ==
=== As lead artist ===
List of singles as lead artist, with selected chart positions and certifications, showing year released and album name
Title	Year	Peak chart positions										Certifications	Album
Title	Year	UK	AUS	CAN	FIN	GER	IRE	NLD	NZ	SWI	US	Certifications	Album
"Rockin' with My Radio" (as S.F.X.)	1983	—	—	—	—	—	—	—	—	—	—		Non-album singles
"Aim to Win"	1984	112	—	—	—	—	—	—	—	—	—		Non-album singles
"Touch Me (I Want Your Body)"	1986	3	1	1	1	4	3	12	5	1	4	BPI: Silver; MC: Platinum	Touch Me
"Do Ya Do Ya (Wanna Please Me)"	1986	10	18	39	1	5	—	35	29	4	87		Touch Me
"Hold On Tight"	1986	26	81	—	7	31	13	—	—	24	—		Touch Me
"I'm All You Need"	1986	41	—	—	15	67	—	—	—	—	—		Touch Me
"Nothing's Gonna Stop Me Now"	1987	8	22	28	1	6	5	5	30	2	80		Samantha Fox
"I Surrender (To the Spirit of the Night)"	1987	25	—	—	9	21	27	82	31	10	—		Samantha Fox
"I Promise You (Get Ready)"	1987	58	—	—	—	40	—	—	—	—	—		Samantha Fox
"True Devotion"	1987	62	—	—	—	32	—	—	—	—	—		Samantha Fox
"Naughty Girls (Need Love Too)"	1988	31	64	11	13	21	24	64	8	—	3		Samantha Fox
"Love House"	1988	32	86	—	6	25	—	10	—	19	—		I Wanna Have Some Fun
"I Wanna Have Some Fun"	1988	63	80	16	—	—	—	—	22	—	8	RIAA: Gold	I Wanna Have Some Fun
"I Only Wanna Be with You"	1989	16	19	29	4	25	9	13	28	24	31		I Wanna Have Some Fun
"(Hurt Me! Hurt Me!) But the Pants Stay On"	1991	—	123	—	—	—	—	—	—	—	—		Just One Night
"Another Woman (Too Many People)"	1991	85	—	—	—	—	—	—	—	—	—		Just One Night
"Just One Night"	1991	—	—	—	—	—	—	—	—	—	—		Just One Night
"More More More"	1991	—	—	—	—	—	—	—	—	—	—		Just One Night
"Let Me Be Free"	1997	188	—	—	—	—	—	—	—	—	—		21st Century Fox
"The Reason Is You (One on One)"	1997	—	—	—	—	—	—	—	—	—	—		21st Century Fox
"Deeper"	1998	—	—	—	—	—	—	—	—	—	—		21st Century Fox
"Perhaps"	1998	—	—	—	—	—	—	—	—	—	—		21st Century Fox
"Angel with an Attitude"	2005	—	—	—	—	—	—	—	—	—	—		Angel with an Attitude
"Midnight Lover"	2008	—	—	—	—	—	—	—	—	—	—		Non-album singles
"Call Me" (vs. Sabrina)	2010	—	—	—	—	—	—	—	—	—	—		Non-album singles
"The Secret" (vs. Zante Dilemma)	2011	—	—	—	—	—	—	—	—	—	—		Non-album singles
"Dance Dance, Throw Your Hands Up in the Air Air" (with Full Force featuring Flavor Flav and The House Party Bullies)	2015	—	—	—	—	—	—	—	—	—	—		With Love from Our Friends
"Hot Stuff"	2015	—	—	—	—	—	—	—	—	—	—		Non-album singles
"La Isla Bonita"	2015	—	—	—	—	—	—	—	—	—	—		Non-album singles
"Touch Me 2016"	2016	—	—	—	—	—	—	—	—	—	—		Non-album singles
"Hot Boy"	2018	—	—	—	—	—	—	—	—	—	—		Non-album singles
"—" denotes a recording that did not chart or was not released in that territory.

=== As featured artist ===
List of singles as featured artist, with selected chart positions, showing year released and album name
Title	Year	Peak chart positions					Album
Title	Year	UK	DEN	FIN	NOR	SWE	Album
"Go For the Heart" (Sox with Samantha Fox)	1995	47	–	–	–	–	Non-album single
"Santa Maria" (DJ Milano featuring Samantha Fox)	1997	31	14	—	—	47	Non-album single
"Touch Me" (Günther featuring Samantha Fox)	2004	—	12	3	7	1	Pleasureman
"Tomorrow (Is Another Day)" (Marc Mysterio featuring Samantha Fox)	2009	—	—	—	—	—	Non-album singles
"Forever" (4 Strings featuring Samantha Fox)	2010	—	—	—	—	—	Non-album singles
"Tomorrow" (Nestor featuring Samantha Fox)	2021	—	—	—	—	—	Kids in a Ghost Town
"—" denotes a recording that did not chart or was not released in that territory.

== Guest appearances ==
List of non-single guest appearances, showing year released and album name
Title	Year	Album
"Now I Lay Me Down"	1989	A Nightmare on Elm Street 5: The Dream Child (Music from the New Line Cinema Motion Picture Soundtrack)

== Videography ==
=== Video albums ===
List of video albums, with certifications
Title	Details	Certifications
Making Music	Released: 1987; Label: Virgin Music Video; Formats: VHS, LaserDisc	
I Wanna Have Some Fun	Released: 1989; Label: BMG Video, Zomba; Format: VHS	
The Music Video Collection	Released: 31 October 1989; Label: Zomba Video, Jive, BMG Video; Formats: VHS, LaserDisc	RIAA: Gold
Just One Night	Released: 22 October 1991; Label: Zomba Video, Jive; Formats: VHS, LaserDisc	
Greatest Hits	Released: 21 September 1992; Label: BMG Video, Zomba Video; Formats: VHS	
All Around the World (as Sam Fox)	Released: 14 June 2002; Label: XIII Bis; Format: DVD	

=== Music videos ===
List of music videos, showing year released and directors
Title	Year	Director	Ref.
"Touch Me (I Want Your Body)"	1986	Tony van den Ende	
"Do Ya Do Ya (Wanna Please Me)"	1986	Tony van den Ende	
"Hold On Tight"	1986	Tony van den Ende	
"Nothing's Gonna Stop Me Now"	1987	Terry Bulley	
"I Surrender (To the Spirit of the Night)"	1987	Terry Bulley	
"I Promise You (Get Ready)"	1987	Pete Bishop	
"True Devotion"	1987	Unknown	
"Naughty Girls (Need Love Too)"	1988	Scott Kalvert	
"Love House"	1988	Eric Watson	
"I Only Wanna Be with You"	1989	Brian Grant	
"I Wanna Have Some Fun"	1989	Scott Kalvert	
"(Hurt Me! Hurt Me!) But the Pants Stay On"	1991	Jim Swaffield	
"Another Woman (Too Many People)"	1991	Martin Jones	
"Just One Night"	1991	Sam Martin	
"Let Me Be Free"	1997	Unknown	
"The Reason Is You (One on One)"	1998	Michael A. Russ	
"Santa Maria" (DJ Milano featuring Samantha Fox)	1998	Ben Hume-Paton	
"Touch Me" (Günther featuring Samantha Fox)	2004	Unknown	
"Angel with an Attitude"	2005	Unknown	
"Call Me" (vs. Sabrina)	2010	Mauro Lovisetto	
"Hot Boy"	2018	Kristian A. Söderström	
