= Greatest Hits (1992 Samantha Fox album) =

Greatest hits album by Samantha Fox
- Released: 14 September 1992
- Genre: Pop
- Label: Jive
- Producer: Timmy Allen; Jon Astrop; Ferdi Bolland; Rob Bolland; John David; John Durno; Adam Fuest; Full Force; Nigel Green; Pete Harris; Steve Lovell; Ralf-René Maué; Steve Power; Stock Aitken Waterman

Samantha Fox chronology
Just One Night (1991)	Greatest Hits (1992)	21st Century Fox (1997)

Professional ratings
Review scores
Source	Rating
AllMusic	4/5 stars

Greatest Hits is the first greatest hits album by English singer Samantha Fox, released on 14 September 1992 by Jive Records. It contains material from Fox's first four studio albums—Touch Me (1986), Samantha Fox (1987), I Wanna Have Some Fun (1988) and Just One Night (1991)—plus a previously unreleased song and two non-album B-sides. An accompanying music video compilation was released on VHS on 21 September 1992.

== Track listing ==
=== Album ===
No.	Title	Writer(s)	Producer(s)	Length
1.	"Touch Me (I Want Your Body)" (from Touch Me)	Mark Shreeve; Jon Astrop; Pete Q. Harris	Astrop; Harris	3:44
2.	"Do Ya Do Ya (Wanna Please Me)" (from Touch Me)	Mike Bissell; Graham Richardson	Steve Lovell; Steve Power	3:48
3.	"Nothing's Gonna Stop Me Now" (from Samantha Fox)	Stock Aitken Waterman	Stock Aitken Waterman	3:42
4.	"I Only Wanna Be with You" (from I Wanna Have Some Fun)	Ivor Raymonde; Michael Hawker	Stock Aitken Waterman	2:42
5.	"I Surrender (To the Spirit of the Night)" (from Samantha Fox)	Astrop; Karen Moline; Shreeve	Astrop	3:56
6.	"I Wanna Have Some Fun" (from I Wanna Have Some Fun)	Full Force	Full Force	3:57
7.	"Hold On Tight" (from Touch Me)	John David	David; Power	3:36
8.	"Just One Night" (from Just One Night)	Full Force	Full Force	5:50
9.	"Naughty Girls (Need Love Too)" (from Samantha Fox)	Full Force	Full Force	3:20
10.	"I Promise You (Get Ready)" (from Samantha Fox)	Oscar Van Geldern	Lovell; Power	3:52
11.	"(I Can't Get No) Satisfaction" (from Samantha Fox)	Mick Jagger; Keith Richards	Timmy Allen	4:10
12.	"Love House" (from I Wanna Have Some Fun)	Rob Bolland; Ferdi Bolland	R. Bolland; F. Bolland	3:35
13.	"Another Woman (Too Many People)" (from Just One Night)	Ralf-René Maué	Maué	3:59
14.	"Spirit of America" (from Just One Night)	Lol Mason; Pat MacManus; Philip Begley	Nigel Green; Jon Durno	4:45
15.	"Hot Lovin'" (from "(Hurt Me! Hurt Me!) But the Pants Stay On" single, 1991)	Samantha Fox; Jon Durno; Scott Addison; Ben Addison	Green; Durno	3:45
16.	"Giving Me a Hard Time" (previously unreleased)	Mike Gallagher; Julian Gallagher; Rodney Hunter	Adam Fuest; Lovell	2:47
17.	"Even in the Darkest Hours" (from "True Devotion" single, 1987)	Tim Burgess; John Forgie	Lovell; Power	5:28
18.	"UK Megamix" (bonus track)			4:39

=== Video ===
No.	Title	Music video director(s)	Length
1.	"Touch Me (I Want Your Body)"	Tony van den Ende	3:44
2.	"Do Ya Do Ya (Wanna Please Me)"	Ende	3:48
3.	"Nothing's Gonna Stop Me Now"	Terry Bulley	3:42
4.	"I Surrender (To the Spirit of the Night)"	Bulley	3:56
5.	"I Promise You (Get Ready)"	Pete Bishop	3:50
6.	"Naughty Girls (Need Love Too)"	Scott Kalvert	3:20
7.	"Love House"	Eric Watson	3:35
8.	"I Only Wanna Be with You"	Brian Grant	2:42
9.	"I Wanna Have Some Fun"	Kalvert	3:57
10.	"(Hurt Me! Hurt Me!) But the Pants Stay On"	Jim Swaffield	5:43
11.	"Just One Night"	Sam Martin	5:50
12.	"Another Woman (Too Many People)"	Martin Jones	3:59

== Personnel ==
- Timmy Allen – producer
- Jon Astrop – producer
- Ferdi Bolland – producer
- Rob Bolland – producer
- John David – producer
- John Durno – producer
- Samantha Fox – primary artist, vocals
- Adam Fuest – producer
- Full Force – arranger, producer
- Joe Grant – photography
- Nigel Green – producer
- Pete Harris – producer
- Steve Lovell – producer
- Ralf-René Maué – arranger, producer
- Steve Power – producer
- Stock Aitken Waterman – producer
- Ben Wilson – cover design
