= Greatest Hits (2009 Samantha Fox album) =

2009 greatest hits album by Samantha Fox

Greatest hits album by Samantha Fox
- Released: 14 December 2009
- Genre: Pop
- Label: Sony Music

Samantha Fox chronology
Angel with an Attitude (2005)	Greatest Hits (2009)

Greatest Hits is a 2009 compilation album by British singer Samantha Fox. It was conceived and developed by British music producer, Carl M Cox, who approached Sony Music with the idea of releasing a definitive hits collection, having discovered a number of unreleased recordings at Pete Waterman's PWL studios to include with material from Fox's first four albums with Jive Records as well as her more recent recordings from the 1990s and early 2000s. Further research by Cox and his Prolific Media Group team unearthed more unreleased recordings held within the BMG archives, some of which were released for the first time on this album.

The collection is available in both single- and double-disc formats. The two-disc deluxe edition features rare and previously unreleased songs.

== Track listing ==
- Disc 1:
1. "Touch Me (I Want Your Body)"
2. "Do Ya Do Ya (Wanna Please Me)"
3. "I'm All You Need"
4. "Nothing's Gonna Stop Me Now"
5. "I Surrender (To the Spirit of the Night)"
6. "I Promise You (Get Ready)"
7. "True Devotion"
8. "Naughty Girls (Need Love Too)"
9. "Love House"
10. "I Only Wanna Be With You"
11. "Hold On Tight"
12. "I Wanna Have Some Fun"
13. "Another Woman"
14. "Go for the Heart"
15. "Santa Maria" (Samantha Fox & DJ Milano)
16. "Confession"
17. "Perhaps"
18. "Angel with an Attitude"
19. "Tomorrow" (Marc Mysterio featuring Samantha Fox)
20. "Touch Me (I Want Your Body)" (2009 Sleazesisters radio mix)
- Disc 2: Rare and Previously Unreleased
1. "Nothing's Gonna Stop Me Now" (Club Mix)
2. "I Only Wanna Be With You" (12" Mix)
3. "You Started Something" (12" Mix)
4. "Too Late to Say Goodbye" (12" Mix)
5. "Go For the Heart" (Italian Underground Radio Version)
6. "Another Woman" (12" Mix)
7. "Santa Maria" (Club Mix)
8. "I Wanna Rock And Roll All Nite"
9. "To Be Heard"
10. "Dreams Unfold"
11. "Don't Cheat On Me"
12. "Tomorrow" (Marc Mysterio featuring Samantha Fox / Groove Stage)
13. "Touch Me (I Want Your Body)" (`09 Sleazesisters Club Mix)
