= Dreams Unfold =

Dreams Unfold may refer to:

- "Dreams Unfold", a song by Joyner Lucas and Lil Tjay
- "Dreams Unfold", a song by Prem Dhillon
- "Dreams Unfold", a song by Samantha Fox from the album Angel with an Attitude
