= Midnight Lover =

Midnight Lover or Midnite Lover may refer to:

== Film ==
- "Midnight Lover", animated short from Crime Time
- Midnight Lovers (1926 film), an American silent romantic war comedy
- Midnight Lovers, a 1975 Italian film also known as The Immortal Bachelor

== Music ==
=== Albums ===
- Midnight Lover (The Square album), 1978
- Midnite Lover, album and song by Shaggy, 1997

=== Songs ===
- "Midnight Lover", song by Joe Dolan, 1977
- "Midnight Lover", song by Leon Russell from his 1978 album Americana
- "Midnight Lover", song by Koreana, 1983
- "Midnight Lover", song by Pete Townshend from Live: Brixton Academy '85
- "Midnight Lover", song by Wiley with A-List, 2010
- "Midnight Lover", song by Side Effect from Portraits
- "Midnight Lover", song by Samantha Fox, 2008
- "Midnight Lover" Gussie Clarke, Freddie McGregor 1991

== See also ==
- Midnight Love (disambiguation)
