= Midnight Love (disambiguation) =

Midnight Love is a 1982 album by Marvin Gaye.

Midnight Love may also refer to:

- Midnight Love (TV series), an American music video television series
- "Midnight Love", a 1994 song by Mick Ronson from Heaven and Hull
- "Midnight Love", a 2011 song by Cave Painting from their EP You'll Be Running Soon
- "Midnight Love", a 1991 song by Roxus from the album Nightstreet
- "Midnight Love", a 1989 song by Fifth Angel from the album Time Will Tell
- "Midnight Love", a 1997 song by Snoop Dogg, featuring Daz Dillinger and Raphael Saadiq
- "Midnight Love", a 2020 song by Girl in Red

== See also ==
- Midnight Lover (disambiguation)
