= Daniela Katzenberger =

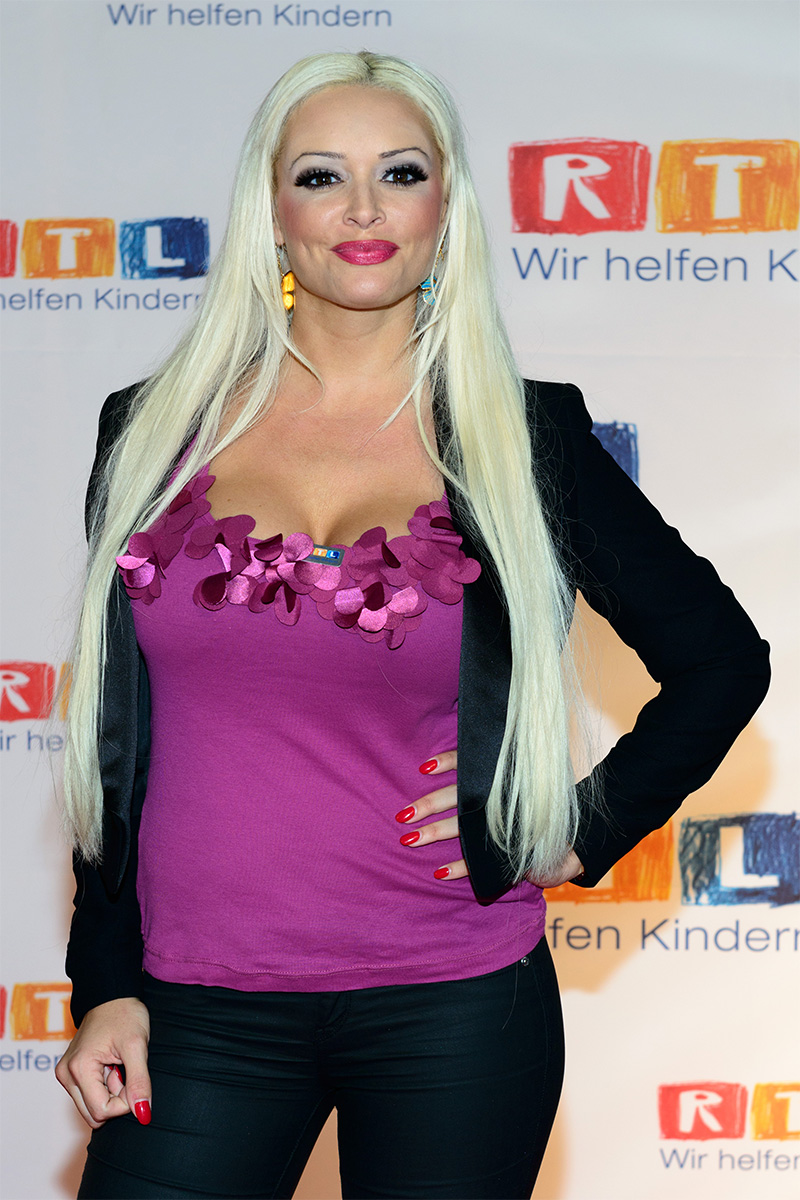
- Katzenberger in 2014
- Born: Daniela Denise Katzenberger; 1 October 1986 (age 39); Ludwigshafen, Germany
- Occupations: TV personality, TV host, model, singer
- Years active: 2009-present
- Musical career
- Genres: Pop
- Label: EMI
- Website: www.danielakatzenberger.net

Daniela Denise Katzenberger (born 1 October 1986) is a German reality TV personality, TV host, model, and singer. She has been featured in several television shows in Germany, mostly on VOX. Her first single, a cover of "Nothing's Gonna Stop Me Now", reached number 19 on the German single charts in 2010.

== Early life ==
Katzenberger was born and raised in Ludwigshafen am Rhein. After secondary school, she trained and qualified as a beautician. Her mother, Iris Klein, was a participant in the 10th season of the German version of TV show Big Brother and the German version of I'm a Celebrity...Get Me Out of Here!. Her sister was 2018 also member in the German Version of I'm a Celebrity...Get Me Out of Here! and won the show.

== Career ==
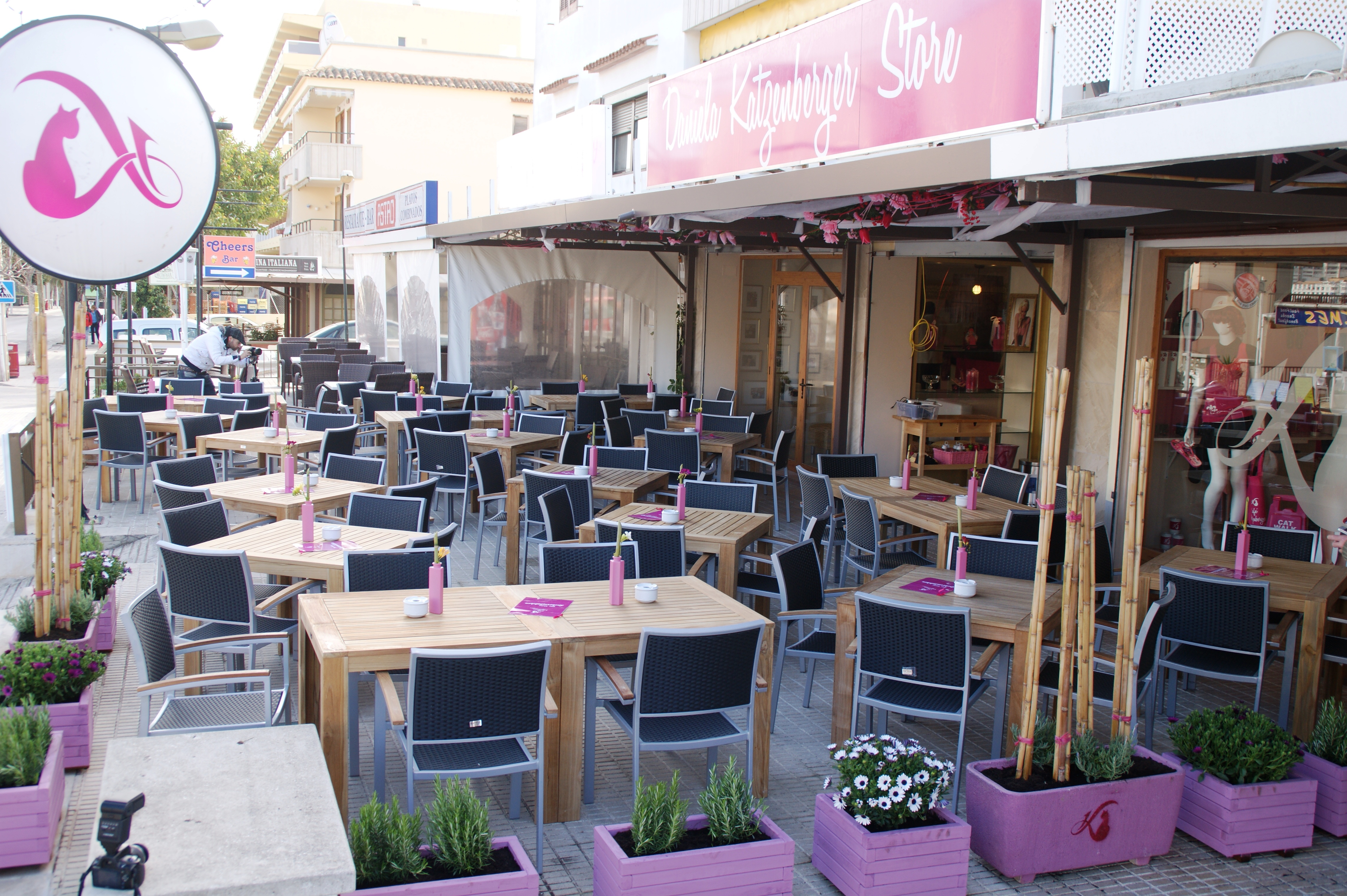
Katzenberger's Café Katzenberger incorporating Daniela Katzenberger Store brand, in Santa Ponsa, Mallorca, Spain

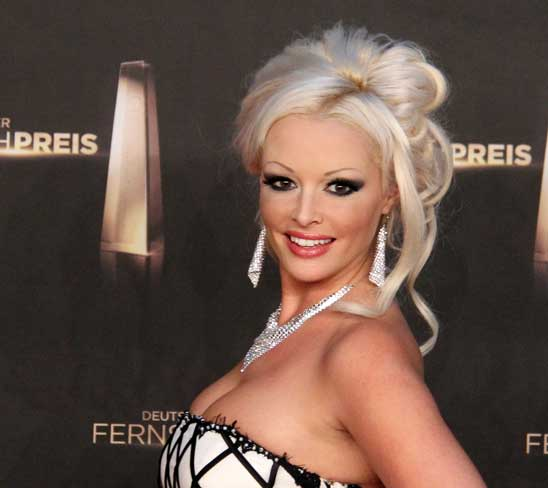
Katzenberger at the Deutscher Fernsehpreis (German Television Award) 2012

In 2009, Katzenberger lost the Top Model of the World Mallorca beauty competition. Her breakthrough came in the same year when she featured in the VOX television soap opera Auf und davon - Mein Auslandstagebuch ("Up and away - My Diary abroad"). In the show, a camera crew followed Katzenberger as she attempted to break into photographic modelling in the United States, including trying to meet Hugh Hefner and applying to appear in the American Playboy magazine, neither of which succeed. In the second season of the show, the viewers follow her as she undergoes plastic surgery to further her glamour modelling career.

Katzenberger also featured in MTV Home and at the VIVA Comet Awards 2010.

From January 2010, she was featured in the TV show Goodbye Deutschland! Die Auswanderer ("Goodbye Germany! The Emigrants") as she opened a café in Santa Ponsa, Mallorca. The show had up to 2.29 million viewers and 11% market-share. She also appeared in the music video "Vamos a la playa" by Loona.

Katzenberger signed a recording contract with EMI in May 2010, and her first single, a cover of Samantha Fox's "Nothing's gonna stop me now" was released. The song reached number 19 in the German charts and number 14 in Austria. The song was released as a digital download and audio CD in August 2010.

Katzenberger has her own show on the German TV channel VOX, Daniela Katzenberger - natürlich blond. It started airing on 21 September 2010.

In 2016, Katzenberger launched her new app Love and Style that advertises her clothes and beauty products.

Katzenberger has written several biographies. She has signed numerous advertising deals with companies such as Kaufland, Lidl, Poco, and Uncle Sam.

== Personal life ==
In 2015 she switched over to RTL II, where she married her husband with a big wedding on her own show.

== Discography ==
=== Albums ===
Title	Details
Frohe Weihnachten (with Lucas Cordalis)	Released: 2 December 2016; Label: Sony Music; Format: CD, digital download

=== Singles ===
Title	Year	Peak chart position			Album
Title	Year	GER	AUT	SWI	Album
"Nothing's Gonna Stop Me Now"	2010	19	14	60	Natürlich blond (compilation)
"I Wanna Be Loved by You" (with Lucas Cordalis)	2016	—	—	—	Non-album single
"—" denotes a single that did not chart or was not released in that territory.

== Filmography ==
Film and television
Year	Title	Role	Notes
2009	Auf und davon – Mein Auslandstagebuch	Herself	Documentary on VOX
2010	MTV Home	Herself	Entertainment on MTV Germany
2010	VIVA Comet – (Laudatio) Encomium	Herself	Music Awards VIVA Germany
2010	Goodbye Deutschland! Die Auswanderer	Herself	Reality television on VOX
2010	Goodbye Deutschland – Das Café-Katzenberger-Spezial	Herself	Reality television on VOX
2010	Daniela Katzenberger – Plötzlich Popstar?	Herself	Documentary on VOX
2010	The Dome 55	Herself	Music event on RTL II
2010	Come Dine with Me (German Version)	Herself	Cooking show on VOX
2010	Daniela Katzenberger – Mein Jahr 2010 (My Year 2010)	Herself	Reality TV mini-series on VOX
2010	2010! Menschen, Bilder, Emotionen	Herself	Annual Year end retrospective on RTL Television
2010–2013	Daniela Katzenberger – natürlich blond	Herself	Reality television on VOX
2011	E! Entertainment Television	Herself	Reality television on NBCUniversal Cable
2011	Verstehen Sie Spaß?	Herself	Candid Camera Reality TV show on ARD
2011	VIVA Comet – (Laudatio) Encomium	Herself	Music Awards VIVA Germany
2011	Daniela Katzenberger – Mein Jahr 2011 (My Year 2011)	Herself	Reality TV mini-series on VOX
2012	Alarm für Cobra 11 – Die Autobahnpolizei, 1st episode – Hundstage (Dog Days)	Zookeeper (uncredited)	Crime drama on RTL Television
2012	Markus Lanz Talk Show	Herself	Talk Show on ZDF
2012	Daniela Katzenberger – Mein Jahr 2012 (My Year 2012)	Herself	Reality TV mini-series on VOX
2013	Das Jenke-Experiment	Herself	Documentary on RTL Television
2013	Danielas Hochzeitsgeheimnis	Herself	Reality TV mini-series on VOX
2013	5 Jahre Daniela Katzenberger (5 Years of Daniela Katzenberger)	Herself	Documentary on VOX
2014	SWR Landesschau	Herself	Regional current affairs show on SWR
2014	Frauchen und die Deiwelsmilch	Miri (leading character)	TV film on Das Erste
2014	Natürlich schön	Herself	Documentary mini-series on VOX
2014	RTL-Spendenmarathon	Herself	Annual fundraising marathon on RTL Television

== Awards ==
- 2011: VIVA Comet Music Awards – Best New Starter (nominated, second place)
- 2011: Licensing Excellence Awards (LIMA-Awards) for Brand/VIP Sport Brand of the Year
- 2011: 8th Quotenmeter.de Television Awards, Best Reality-Show for "Daniela Katzenberger – natürlich blond"
- 2011: Bravo Otto in Silver for TV-Star (female)
- 2012: Bravo Otto in Silver for TV-Star (female)

== Autobiography ==
- Sei schlau, stell dich dumm (Be smart, stand stupid), Köln 2011, ISBN 978-3404606696
- Katze küsst Kater: Mein Buch über die Liebe (Cat kisses Tomcat: My book about love), Köln 2013, ISBN 9783404607556
- Eine Tussi wird Mama: Neun Monate auf dem Weg zum Katzenbaby, Köln 2015, ISBN 9783864703430
