= Tomorrow (Is Another Day) =

Single by Marc Mysterio featuring Samantha Fox

from the album Greatest Hits
- Released: 2009
- Recorded: 2009
- Genre: Dance
- Label: Amerada Music

Marc Mysterio singles chronology
"Sunshine" (2009)	"Tomorrow (Is Another Day)" (2009)	"Shout it Out" (2010)

Samantha Fox singles chronology
"Santa Maria" (1997)	"Tomorrow (Is Another Day)" (2009)	"Call Me" (2010)

"Tomorrow (Is Another Day)"is a dance song by Canadian musician Marc Mysterio and British singer Samantha Fox, recorded and released in 2009.

"Tomorrow" was issued in three single formats, containing numerous remixes.

The song was later included on Samantha's retrospective album, Greatest Hits, released in December 2009.
