= True Devotion =

- CD and 7-inch single cover

Single by Samantha Fox

from the album Samantha Fox
- B-side: "Even in the Darkest Hours"; "Fox Hunt Mix"; "Nothing's Gonna Stop Me Now"
- Released: December 1987
- Genre: Pop
- Length: 4:34
- Label: Jive
- Songwriter(s): Lol Mason; Mark Shreeve
- Producer(s): Steve Lovell; Steve Power

Samantha Fox singles chronology
"I Promise You (Get Ready)" (1987)	"True Devotion" (1987)	"Naughty Girls (Need Love Too)" (1987)

"True Devotion" is a song by English singer Samantha Fox from her eponymous second studio album (1987). It was released in December 1987 as the album's fourth single. The song was written by Lol Mason and Mark Shreeve, and produced by Steve Lovell and Steve Power.

The single includes two B-sides: the previously unreleased song "Even in the Darkest Hours" (originally recorded by Belfast punks Ruefrex) and "Fox Hunt Mix", which is a remix of Fox's previous singles "I Surrender (To the Spirit of the Night)" and "Touch Me (I Want Your Body)". The CD single also features "Nothing's Gonna Stop Me Now" as a B-side. It was her first single to be released on CD.

The song failed to match the success of its predecessors in Europe and performed moderately on the charts. The single peaked at number 62 in the United Kingdom and number 32 in Germany.

== Track listings ==
- 7-inch single

A. "True Devotion" – 4:34
B. "Even In the Darkest Hours" (Edit Version) – 4:29

- 12-inch single

A1. "True Devotion" – 4:34
A2. "Even In the Darkest Hours" (Extended Version) – 5:26
B1. "Fox Hunt Mix" – 5:57

- CD single
1. "True Devotion" – 4:34
2. "Even In the Darkest Hours" (Extended Version) – 5:26
3. "Fox Hunt Mix" – 5:57
4. "Nothing's Gonna Stop Me Now" – 3:42

== Charts ==
Chart (1987)	Peak position
Quebec (ADISQ)	4
UK Singles (OCC)	62
West Germany (GfK)	32
