= 21st Century Fox (album) =

Studio album by Samantha Fox
- Released: 6 October 1997
- Genres: Eurodance; pop
- Length: 53:09
- Label: Ichiban
- Producers: Cris Bonacci; Alex Trime & Delgado; Noog + Topal; Ian Horne; Patrick McMahon; Andreas Bruhn; Team 3 Productions; Tom Fredericks

Samantha Fox chronology
Greatest Hits (1992)	21st Century Fox (1997)	Angel with an Attitude (2005)

Singles from 21st Century Fox
- 1. "Let Me Be Free" Released: 10 February 1997; 2. "The Reason Is You (One on One)" Released: 1997; 3. "Perhaps" Released: 1998

Professional ratings
Review scores
Source	Rating
AllMusic	2/5 stars

21st Century Fox is the fifth studio album by the English model-turned-singer Samantha Fox. The Eurodance-pop album was released by Ichiban Records in 1997. The title is a play on major film studio 20th Century Fox.

At the time of the album's release, the studio's parent company was News Corporation, although in 2013 it became part of a new parent company with the same name as this album (21st Century Fox).

== Background ==
After a six-year hiatus, Samantha Fox returned to the studio to record her fifth album, 21st Century Fox. She had a new look and a new style in music. In fact, this album focused on the dance genre and was a big hit in clubs around Europe. The first song released was "Deeper", which was unsuccessful, though receiving a lot of airplay. She released her first single, "Let Me Be Free", which marked a comeback for her, charting in some European countries. The video shows Fox in the box ring with a male lover. Further singles were the Latin-flavoured "The Reason Is You (One on One)" and "Perhaps". She described the album as "more personal" than her previous work.

== Track listings ==
No.	Title	Writer(s)	Length
1.	"Just a Dream"	Cris Bonacci, Samantha Fox, Mark Shreeve	3:15
2.	"The Reason Is You (One on One)"	Bonacci, Fox, Nosie Katzmann	3:57
3.	"I Dream in Colours"	Fox, Ian Horne, Patrick McMahon	3:40
4.	"Deeper"	Andreas Bruhn, Fox	3:58
5.	"Where Is the Love?"	Matt Barry, Fox	4:41
6.	"Love Makes You"	Sarah Fisher, Fox, Ros Swan	3:55
7.	"Let Me Be Free"	MaSong, Manirock, Riffi	3:52
8.	"Wasted N.R.G."	Bonacci, Fox, Lorraine McIntosh	3:23
9.	"Say What You Want"	Bonacci, Fox	4:28
10.	"Do You Want Me?"	Jon Astrop, Fox	3:21
11.	"Boundaries of Love"	Bonacci, Fox	3:51
12.	"Watching You"	Bonacci, Fox, Melanie Wallace	6:31
13.	"Perhaps"	Osvaldo Farrés, Joe Davies	4:17

=== Watching You, Watching Me ===
A remixed version of 21st Century Fox was released by Phantom Records as Watching You, Watching Me in 2002.

No.	Title	Writer(s)	Length
1.	"Watching You" (Ground Control Mix)
2.	"Deeper" (Ground Control Mix)
3.	"Perhaps" (12 Inch Sleaze Sisters Mix)
4.	"Let Me Be Free" (CD Single Radio Edit)
5.	"Santa Maria" (7")	Mike Stock, Matt Aitken
6.	"Boundaries of Love" (7")
7.	"Go for the Heart" (Italian Underground Mix)	Jon Durno, Fox
8.	"Wasted NRG" (Trance Mix)
9.	"Do You Want Me?"
10.	"Say What You Want"
11.	"All Day and All Night" (Acoustic Mix)	Astrop, Fox
12.	"Enlace Moi" (French Ground Control Mix)	Bonacci, Fox, Wallace, Sophie Chery
13.	"Just a Dream" (Original 1986 Demo Version)
