= I Only Want to Be with You =

1963 single by Dusty Springfield

- Side A of 1963 UK vinyl single

Single by Dusty Springfield

from the album Stay Awhile/I Only Want to Be with You
- B-side: "Once Upon a Time"
- Released: 8 November 1963
- Recorded: 1963
- Studio: Olympic, London
- Genre: Pop; blue-eyed soul
- Length: 2:37
- Label: Philips
- Songwriters: Mike Hawker; Ivor Raymonde
- Producer: Johnny Franz

Dusty Springfield singles chronology
"I Only Want to Be with You" (1963)	"Stay Awhile" (1964)

"I Only Want to Be with You" is a song written by Mike Hawker and Ivor Raymonde. Released as the debut solo single by British singer Dusty Springfield under her long-time producer Johnny Franz, "I Only Want to Be with You" peaked at number 4 on the UK singles chart in January 1964.

"I Only Want to Be with You" has been recorded by a wide range of artists, and three remakes of the song were UK chart hits. The first two by the Bay City Rollers (1976) and the Tourists (1979) matched the number 4 peak of the Dusty Springfield original, while the 1989 remake by Samantha Fox peaked at number 16. The song has been a top 40 hit in the US on the Billboard Hot 100 chart three times, with both the Dusty Springfield original and the Bay City Rollers' remake peaking at number 12 while the Samantha Fox remake peaked at number 31. Many non-English versions have also been recorded by other artists.

== Dusty Springfield version ==
=== Background ===
According to Jean Ryder, the ex-wife of songwriter Mike Hawker, "I Only Want to Be With You" was written soon after she and Hawker married on 1 December 1961, being inspired by Hawker's intense romantic feelings for his new bride. Ryder, who would later be a member of the Breakaways, had been a member of vocal chorale the Vernons Girls. Reportedly, she and Hawker had intended that she herself would record "I Only Want to Be With You". However, no formal arrangement for this eventuality had apparently been made by the autumn of 1963, when Hawker received a phone call from Philips A&R director Johnny Franz. Ryder paraphrases Franz as saying "Look we need something which is going to put this girl into the charts, because everybody is knocking her, everybody is saying she'll never make it [solo] – have you got a song that's a guaranteed hit?" Springfield had already recorded nine solo tracks, none of which was deemed the right vehicle to launch her solo career. With Ryder's permission, Hawker submitted "I Only Want to Be With You" to Franz, having made a demo featuring Ryder singing while keeping the beat by tapping on a biscuit tin lid. Franz, and then Springfield, approved the song, which Springfield recorded in a 25 October 1963 session at Olympic Studios, arranged and conducted by Ivor Raymonde, and recorded by engineer Keith Grant. Jean Ryder, as a member of The Breakaways, was included in the vocal chorale on the session. For unknown reasons, a version with Springfield's unadulterated vocals was rejected. The song was produced using the Wall of Sound production method first conceived by Phil Spector, while the various instrumental features in the arrangement such as backup singers, double-tracked vocals, and a horn section were inspired by groups such as the Shirelles.

Released in November 1963, three weeks after the Springfields' final concert, "I Only Want to Be With You" was a global success, reaching number 4 UK, number 12 US, number 6 Australia, and number 21 Canada. In the US, Dusty Springfield was the second artist of the British Invasion, after the Beatles, to have a hit, entering the Billboard chart at number 77 in the last week of January 1964 (the Beatles having "She Loves You" at number 69 and "I Want to Hold Your Hand" at number 3).

Raymonde's arrangement is unmistakable, with its relentless "ticker-ticker" beat and cascading drum rolls, full-on choirs and "Tower of Power" horn section pitched against soaring rock strings. It set the production standard for Springfield's later hits, such as "Stay Awhile" and "Little by Little". Springfield also recorded the song with an almost identical arrangement in German, with the title "Auf dich nur wart' ich immerzu".

The song was performed by Springfield on the first-ever edition of the BBC's Top of the Pops, on 1 January 1964.

Springfield's version was re-released in 1988, coinciding with its use in a soft-drink commercial, as a 7" and 12" single, peaking at number 83 in the UK.

Springfield's "I Only Want to Be with You" served as the theme song for the HBO sitcom Arliss, from 1997 to 2002 (replacing "I Can't Help Myself (Sugar Pie Honey Bunch)" by the Four Tops which was the series' theme in its inaugural 1996 season).

=== Charts ===
Chart (1964)	Peak position
Australian ARIA Charts	6
Canadian Singles Chart	21
Ireland (IRMA)	7
New Zealand Charts	7
UK Singles Chart	4
US Billboard Hot 100	12
US Cash Box Top 100	14

=== Certifications ===
Region	Certification	Certified units/sales
United Kingdom (BPI)	Silver	200,000^{‡}
^{‡} Sales+streaming figures based on certification alone.

== Bay City Rollers version ==
"I Only Wanna Be with You"
- Side A of 1976 UK vinyl single

Single by Bay City Rollers

from the album Dedication
- B-side: "Write a Letter" (North America); "Rock N' Roller" (Europe/International)
- Released: 29 August 1976 (US); 3 September 1976 (UK)
- Recorded: June 1976
- Studio: Soundstage, Toronto
- Genre: Pop rock; power pop
- Length: 3:27
- Label: Arista (North America); Bell (Europe/International)
- Songwriters: Mike Hawker; Ivor Raymonde
- Producer: Jimmy Ienner

Bay City Rollers singles US singles chronology
"Rock and Roll Love Letter" (1976)	"I Only Wanna Be with You" (1976)	"Yesterday's Hero" (1976)

=== Background ===
The Bay City Rollers recorded "I Only Want to Be with You" for their 1976 album Dedication in June and July 1976 at Soundstage Studio in Toronto with producer Jimmy Ienner. Dedication was the first Bay City Rollers recorded under the auspices of Arista Records, and it was Arista president Clive Davis who suggested that the group remake "I Only Want to Be with You". Jimmy Ienner was chosen by Davis to produce the Bay City Rollers on the basis of Ienner's work with the Raspberries.

=== Release ===
In the U.S. "I Only Want to Be with You" was issued as an advance single from Dedication in August 1976. That October the track reached a Billboard Hot 100 peak of number 12, besting the number 28 position of the preceding Bay City Rollers' single "Rock and Roll Love Letter" while failing to match the Top Ten successes during 1975–1976 with "Saturday Night" and "Money Honey". "I Only Want to Be with You" appeared to wrap up the group's burst of North American stardom as their next three U.S. single releases were Top 40 shortfalls. However, their fourth U.S. single release after "I Only Want to Be With You", "You Made Me Believe in Magic", did afford the group a final Top Ten hit.

Issued in the UK as a non-album single on 3 September 1976, and slightly re-titled as "I Only Wanna Be with You", it reached number 4, affording the Bay City Rollers a tenth and final Top Ten hit.

It's noteworthy that the U.S. and UK chart peaks of the Bay City Rollers' 1976 remake of "I Only Want to Be with You" exactly matched the positions achieved in 1964 by the Dusty Springfield original. However, Springfield's version had had a significantly stronger UK chart run holding at number 4 for 4 weeks – as opposed to the Bay City Rollers remake's one-week chart peak – with the original's Top 50 tenure of 18 weeks being twice as long as the remake's. Conversely in the U.S. the Bay City Rollers' remake had a Billboard Hot 100 tenure of 15 weeks while the Springfield original had maintained a Hot 100 presence for 10 weeks in total. (Comparisons between the chart impact of singles issued in distinct time periods should be considered imprecise, the methodology behind both the UK and U.S. chart rankings having been frequently revised.)

=== Promotion ===
Chicago radio superstation WLS, which gave the song much airplay, ranked "I Only Want to Be with You" as the 14th most popular hit of 1976. It spent two weeks at number two on their survey of 6 November 1976.

=== Chart performance ===
==== Weekly charts ====
Chart (1976)	Peak position
Australia (Kent Music Report)	8
Austrian Singles Chart	17
Belgian Singles Chart (Flanders)	14
Canada RPM Top Singles	3
Canada RPM Adult Contemporary	28
Dutch Singles Chart	9
German Singles Chart	9
Irish Singles Chart	2
Japan (Oricon)	
New Zealand Singles Chart	12
UK Singles Chart	4
US Billboard Hot 100	12
US Billboard Adult Contemporary	27
US Cash Box Top 100	8

==== Year-end charts ====
Chart (1976)	Rank
Australia (Kent Music Report)	58
Canada	82
Netherlands	80
New Zealand	49
UK	49

== The Tourists version ==
"I Only Want to Be with You"
- UK cover

Single by The Tourists

from the album Reality Effect
- B-side: "Summers Night"
- Released: 25 October 1979
- Genre: Power pop; pop rock; new wave
- Length: 2:24
- Label: Logo
- Songwriters: Mike Hawker; Ivor Raymonde
- Producer: Tom Allom

Tourists singles chronology
"The Loneliest Man in the World" (1979)	"I Only Want to Be with You" (1979)	"So Good to Be Back Home Again" (1980)

Music video
- "I Only Want to Be with You" on YouTube

=== Background ===
In 1979, the song was also covered by the Tourists, a band which included Annie Lennox on vocals – which served as the band's biggest hit.

=== Recording and reception ===
The song was "put down in twenty minutes at the end of the album sessions", with Lennox recording the vocals in one take.

Lennox later said that "we were taken to the cleaners for doing that bloody song", as "the press absolutely slaughtered us". Dave Stewart said that "It was a bit out of proportion with 'I Only Want to Be with You' – the poppy side of it was really overplayed by everybody".

Reviewing the song for Record Mirror, Daniela Soave included it among the singles of the week, writing that the song "definitely grows on you" and that "Lennox has the same deep mellow tones that Dusty Springfield displayed when she sang the same song, but it is saved from being a carbon-cover version by the instrumentation... handclaps, vicious guitar, chugging bass, that sort of thing.

=== Chart performance ===
==== Weekly charts ====
Weekly chart performance for "I Only Want to Be with You"
Chart (1979–80)	Peak position
Australia (Kent Music Report)	6
Canada Top Singles (RPM)	50
Ireland (IRMA)	13
UK Singles (Official Charts)	4
US Billboard Hot 100	83

==== Year-end charts ====
Year-end chart performance for "I Only Want to Be with You"
Chart (1980)	Position
Australia (Kent Music Report)	57

== Nicolette Larson version ==
"I Only Want to Be with You"

Single by Nicolette Larson

from the album All Dressed Up and No Place to Go
- B-side: "How Can We Go On"
- Released: July 1982
- Studio: Sunset Sound, Hollywood
- Genre: Soft rock
- Length: 3:16
- Label: Warner Bros.
- Songwriters: Mike Hawker; Ivor Raymonde
- Producer: Andrew Gold

Nicolette Larson singles chronology
"Fool Me Again" (1981)	"I Only Want to Be with You" (1982)	"Only Love Will Make Love Right" (1985)

Nicolette Larson remade "I Only Want to Be with You" for her album All Dressed Up and No Place to Go produced by Andrew Gold and recorded October 1981 – January 1982 at Sunset Sound. Released as a single in July 1982 – parallel with the album's release – Larson's version featured as B-side "How Can We Go On", a track from Larson's 1981 album Radioland which had been an unsuccessful 1981 A-side release.

Reviewing All Dressed Up and No Place to Go, High Fidelity critic Steven X. Rea cited "Dusty Springfield's 60s gem 'I Only Want to Be with You'" as one of several tracks which "Nicolette sings in an awkward warble, devoid of any emotional range". It drew similarly dismissive reaction from Tom Long of the Santa Cruz Sentinel, who rated the original 1963 hit a "swell oldie [that's an] ingratiating piece of fluff" and Larson's remake "awful [although] despite uninspired vocals and sheet musicianship [it] sounds good on the radio simply because the song itself sounds good and tickles forgotten memory synapses". Bill Provick of the Ottawa Citizen who opined Larson gave "a rather lacklustre reading of [a] normally effervescent pop-rock classic." Tim Gebhart of the Rapid City Journal was more positive: "Larson['s] version remains true to the original but also contains her own special touch in the vocals."

Despite becoming Larson's fourth single to rank on the Hot 100 chart in Billboard magazine – and her first Hot 100 entry since 1980 – "I Only Want to Be with You" would prove a top 40 shortfall, stalling at number 53 in September 1983. Larson's label WB Records, electing not to issue a second single from All Dressed Up and No Place to Go, were motivated by the underperformance of that album and its one single to end Larson's label tenure. Larson would have one subsequent major label affiliation, having two country music-focused albums released by MCA Records in 1985–86.

== Samantha Fox version ==
"I Only Wanna Be with You"
- 12-inch single cover

Single by Samantha Fox

from the album I Wanna Have Some Fun
- B-side: "Confession"
- Released: 16 January 1989
- Studio: PWL, London
- Genre: Pop
- Length: 2:45
- Label: Jive
- Songwriters: Mike Hawker; Ivor Raymonde
- Producer: Stock Aitken Waterman

Samantha Fox singles chronology
"I Wanna Have Some Fun" (1988)	"I Only Wanna Be with You" (1989)	"(Hurt Me! Hurt Me!) But the Pants Stay On" (1991)

Music video
- "I Only Want to Be with You" on YouTube

In 1988, British singer Samantha Fox covered the song as "I Only Wanna Be with You" for her third studio album, I Wanna Have Some Fun (1988).

Fox would recall the song as being the first song she ever learned to sing, the Dusty Springfield original version being among a stack of singles her mother handed down to her when she was 10. The decision to record the song was Fox's, and she was relieved when producers Stock Aitken Waterman agreed to the idea, having worried they would only want to record their own compositions, for publishing reasons.

Released as the follow-up single to the album's title cut, "I Only Wanna Be with You" was promoted with a music video which included scenes of Fox hunting through rubbish bins, dancing, fireworks, and the singer in bed with her bespectacled lover. Fox also promoted the song via televised performances, including those on Top of the Pops in 1989 and Viva el espectáculo on TVE1 in 1990.

"I Only Wanna Be with You" earned Fox her final global hit single to date. It topped the chart in Belgium, and peaked at number 2 in Finland, marking her seventh top 10 single there. In the United States, where "I Wanna Have Some Fun" had been a top ten hit, "I Only Wanna Be with You" rose no higher than number 31 and would mark Fox's final Billboard Hot 100 appearance. In Fox's native UK, her version outperformed her previous six single releases with a number-16 peak, but would also become her final major hit, bar her 1998 one-off comeback single "Santa Maria".

=== Critical reception ===
Robin Smith, reviewer of British music newspaper Record Mirror, was disappointed by Fox's choice. In his opinion, the British singer made a serious mistake after the "sheer excellence of "Love House", adding that the decision to use a "tired remake of an old hit" will grant her a "first class ticket back to bimbo land."

=== Track listings ===
- 7-inch single

A. "I Only Wanna Be with You" – 2:45
B. "Confession" – 4:40

- 12-inch single

A1. "I Only Wanna Be with You" (Extended Mix) – 4:56
A2. "I Only Wanna Be with You" (Acapella Mix) – 3:17
B1. "I Only Wanna Acid with You" (Mix 1) – 6:20
B2. "Confession" – 4:40

- European CD single
1. "I Only Wanna Be with You" – 2:45
2. "Nothing's Gonna Stop Me Now" – 3:42
3. "I Only Wanna Be with You" (Extended Version) – 4:56
4. "Confession" – 4:40
- Japanese mini CD single
1. "I Only Wanna Be with You"
2. "The Best Is Yet to Come"
- 12-inch U.S. single (Jive / RCA 1193-1-JD)

A1. "I Only Wanna Be with You" (Extended Mix) – 4:56
A2. "I Only Wanna Be with You" (Single Edit) – 2:45
A3. "I Only Wanna Burn with You" - 6:20
B1. "I Only Wanna House with You" – 6:20
B2. "I Only Wanna Be with You" (Special Single Edit) - 3:19
B3. "Confession" – 4:40

=== Charts ===
==== Weekly charts ====
Chart (1989)	Peak position
Australia (ARIA)	19
Austria (Ö3 Austria Top 40)	19
Belgium (Ultratop 50 Flanders)	1
Canada Top Singles (RPM)	29
Europe (European Hot 100 Singles)	27
Finland (Suomen virallinen lista)	2
France (SNEP)	10
Ireland (IRMA)	9
Italy Airplay (Music & Media)	4
Luxembourg (Radio Luxembourg)	14
Netherlands (Dutch Top 40)	11
Netherlands (Single Top 100)	13
New Zealand (Recorded Music NZ)	28
Quebec (ADISQ)	2
Switzerland (Schweizer Hitparade)	24
UK Singles (Official Charts)	16
UK Dance (Music Week)	12
US Billboard Hot 100	31
US Dance Club Songs (Billboard)	46
US Dance Singles Sales (Billboard)	12
US Cash Box Top 100	38
West Germany (GfK)	25

==== Year-end charts ====
Chart (1989)	Position
Belgium (Ultratop 50 Flanders)	21
Europe (European Hot 100)	90
Netherlands (Dutch Top 40)	97

== Other versions ==
More than a hundred versions of this song have been made in many languages (English, French, Spanish, Portuguese, Japanese, etc.). Most notably among them "Ahora Te Puedes Marchar" by Luis Miguel, "Jykevää on Rakkaus" by Rauli "Badding" Somerjoki and Ville Valo or the cover of the danish rock band Volbeat.

== Other uses in media ==
- The song was covered by Vonda Shepard in the season 1 episode titled "The Promise" of Ally McBeal.
- The song was used in the British soap opera EastEnders when the character Sam Mitchell dug up the body of Den Watts.
- The song was used by TVNZ's TV2 to promote their programming from 1997 to mid-2000, with the chorus changing its words to "You only wanna be with 2".
- The song was also used as soundtrack in Greek comedy TV series Tilempora (TV Storm) on Mega Channel in 2004.
- The song was used by CBC Television to promote its programming between 1989 and 1991, while the network's slogan was "CBC and You".
- The song featured in a John Lewis television ad highlighting how the company had been selling electronic equipment for a substantial number of years.
- The song was used in a swimwear advert for Boux Avenue in 2014. The ad featured Jamelia, who also sang the song, with the chorus changed to "I only want to be with Boux".
- A television ad campaign for Dogs Trust which launched in February 2016 features Hope Russell-Winter singing "I Only Want to Be With You".
- The song was also featured in an episode of That '70s Show when Fez and Donna were having scenes where they pretended to be dating.
- Me First and the Gimme Gimmes' version of the song was used in an episode of Shameless (US).
- The song was used in the 2007 film Norbit, when Kate teaches Norbit how to ride a bicycle.
- The song was used in season 5, episode 2 of Ray Donovan as Ray and Abby are driving around on their anniversary.
- Janine sings the song to her baby in the hospital in season 2, episode 8 of The Handmaid's Tale.
- A cover version of the song, played by a saxophonist, serves as the theme tune to ITV sitcom Kate & Koji (2020-2022).
- A cover version of the song was sung in the movie Heartstopper Forever (2026), sung by the character Sahar Zahid, played by actress Leila Khan
- The Tourists' cover of the song was used in the final closedown montage of Thames Television.

== See also ==
- "Ahora Te Puedes Marchar", the Spanish-language version by Luis Miguel.
