= Nestor (band) =

Swedish rock band

- Origin: Falköping, Sweden
- Genres: Hard Rock; Melodic Hard Rock
- Years active: 1989–1995; 2021–present
- Label: Napalm
- Members: Tobias Gustavsson; Jonny Wemmenstedt; Marcus Åblad; Martin Frejinger; Mattias Carlsson
- Website: nestortheband.com

Nestor is a Swedish Melodic Hard Rock band from Falköping. The band formed in 1989 and was active locally until 1995, releasing a handful of EPs unofficially but with no official album release, before going on hiatus and reforming in 2021.

In 2021, they released their first album Kids in a Ghost Town. In 2022, a deluxe version of Kids in a Ghost Town was released, containing three additional songs. Reviewing for metal.de, Sonja Schreyer wrote that the album's remaining tracks were just as strong as its breakout single "On the Run", highlighting the title track and "1989" as continuing the same 1980s feel, and singled out the duet "Tomorrow", featuring 1980s icon Samantha Fox, as a highlight.

Kids in a Ghost Town was nominated for the Hard Rock/Metal category at the 2022 Swedish Grammy Awards (Grammis). The band also won Album of the Year and Song of the Year at both the Rocknyttpriset and the Bandit Rock Awards for Teenage Rebel; its song "Caroline" was named Song of the Year at the 2025 Rocknyttpriset.

Nestor performed at the 2023 edition of Rock Hard Festival in Gelsenkirchen, Germany, alongside acts including Testament, Sodom, and the Michael Schenker Group, despite nearly missing their slot after cancelled flights forced a last-minute route via France. A review by Raymond Helebrand for Headbangers Lifestyle praised the band's live recreation of a 1980s glam and melodic rock sound as note-perfect, remarking that the performance was "perhaps even a little too perfectly" polished.

On 26 March 2024, the band announced their second album, Teenage Rebel, which was released on 31 May, and released the song "Victorious". Angry Metal Guy rated Teenage Rebel 3.5 out of 5, describing it as a "guilty pleasure" in the mould of 1980s radio rock acts such as Survivor and Journey; the reviewer noted having enjoyed the band's 2021 debut more than expected while declining to review it at the time, but chose to review Teenage Rebel directly. Teenage Rebel was nominated for a Grammis in the Hard Rock/Metal category in 2025.

In May 2025, the band released the standalone single In the Name of Rock'n'Roll, with a music video filmed in South Africa.

In January 2026, Nestor played its first shows in Japan, performing in Tokyo and Osaka.

The live album, Live at Gothenburg Film Studios, was released on 14 August 2026 via Napalm Records. The album idea originated from recordings the band routinely made while on tour for internal review rather than for release. According to frontman Tobias Gustavsson, the original intention had been to release individual songs from the tour recordings as monthly YouTube videos, before the strength of the mixes and an expected wait until 2027 for a third studio album led the band to develop a full live release instead.

Markus Endres of Metal.de rated the album 8/10, praising Tobias Gustavsson's vocal performance and highlighting a reworked version of "On the Run". Endres noted that audience reactions were not always clearly audible in the mix, which he felt reduced the live atmosphere. Writing for Rockposer, Jason Hopper praised the album's balance and clarity, and highlighted an extended live arrangement of "Victorious" featuring a crowd chant not present on the studio version. Hopper criticised the use of audio fades between tracks, and noted that the accompanying Blu-ray intersperses songs with band interviews and omits four tracks present on the audio release. Midlands Rocks gave the album an unreserved positive review, comparing it to live albums such as Kiss's Alive and Iron Maiden's Live After Death.

Rocknytt reviewed the Gothenburg Film Studios concert itself, published ahead of the album's release. Peter Johansson praised Gustavsson's live vocals but criticised the decision to close the set with "It Ain't Me" rather than "1989".

At NestorFest 2026, Gustavsson announced plans for a new studio album, expected in time for the 2027 festival season, describing a harder-edged direction compared to the more polished, West Coast-influenced sound of Teenage Rebel.

== NestorFest ==
Nestor also hosts an annual music festival, NestorFest, in their hometown of Falköping, which was first held in 2022 and drew 3,000 visitors. In the months leading up to the festival, the organisers rebuilt the stage (the old one had rotted) and chartered a dedicated train from Gothenburg to Falköping to bring fans to the festival. Nestor Fest sold out two months ahead of the event; the majority of attendees were local, 39% from Sweden, and 1% were international fans.

According to the band, NestorFest was never intended as a pure hard rock festival; its stated ambition is to book artists with a nostalgic connection to Falköping's Folkets Park alongside acts the band feels deserve a wider audience, or "up and coming" performers who lack a stage of their own.

The festival expanded to two days in 2023 and again sold out, with acts including German synth-pop group Alphaville.

The 2024 edition of NestorFest, held 9–10 August, sold out for the third consecutive year and expanded its lineup, featuring Hardcore Superstar, The Night Flight Orchestra, Sator, and The Gems alongside Nestor. The bill was rounded out by Vanity Insanity, an Umeå-based band who won the final of the band's own Nestor Next talent competition to earn the slot.A Rocknytt review of the festival described an elaborate opening, with the band—dressed in dark, captain-inspired costumes trimmed in gold, entering to a fanfare titled "The Law of Jante", accompanied by drummers and a cheerleading troupe, before the set opened with "We Come Alive" from that year's newly released album.

In December 2024, the band announced a pause of the festival for 2025, citing a heavy touring schedule, with plans to return on a larger scale in 2026.

NestorFest returned in August 2026 as a three-day event across two stages, with a lineup including Popsicle, Atomic Swing, Melody Club, and Orup. The 2026 edition drew a record crowd of around 3,500 on the Saturday, surpassing the previous attendance record of 3,180, though the band indicated afterward that the three-day format was unlikely to be repeated, citing noticeably lighter attendance on the opening day.

Alongside the festival, the band runs a talent competition, Nestor Next, in which the winning act earns a performance slot at NestorFest. Vanity Insanity from Umeå won the first edition of the competition.

== Discography ==
=== Albums ===
- Kids in a Ghost Town (2021)
- Teenage Rebel (2024)
- Live at Gothenburg Film Studios (2026)

=== Singles ===
- "On the Run" (2021)
- "1989" (2021)
- "Tomorrow" (feat. Samantha Fox) (2021)
- "Signed in Blood" (2022)
- "These Days" (2022)
- "Victorious" (2024)
- "Caroline" (2024)
- "In The Name Of Rock'n'Roll" (2025)

== Tours ==
- The Teenage Rebel Tour 2024 (fall 2024)
