= Just One Night (Samantha Fox album) =

Studio album by Samantha Fox
- Released: 21 June 1991
- Studios: Battery, New York City (Note: Tracks 1–5 and 7–12); Sigma Sound, New York City (Note: Tracks 2 and 3); Axis, New York City (Note: Track 5); Sunrise, Hamburg (Note: Track 6); Midiland, Miami (Note: Track 7); Studio 150, Amsterdam (Note: Tracks 8 and 10); The Hit Factory, New York City (Note: Track 12)
- Genre: Dance-pop
- Length: 48:11
- Label: Jive
- Producers: Robert Clivillés; David Cole; Jon Durno; Full Force; Nigel Green; Ralf René Maué; Paul Taylor; Eric Foster White; James Young

Samantha Fox chronology
I Wanna Have Some Fun (1988)	Just One Night (1991)	Greatest Hits (1992)

Singles from Just One Night
- 1. "(Hurt Me! Hurt Me!) But the Pants Stay On" Released: 1991; 2. "Another Woman (Too Many People)" Released: 1991; 3. "Just One Night" Released: 1992; 4. "Spirit of America" Released: 1992

Professional ratings
Review scores
Source	Rating
AllMusic	3/5 stars
Entertainment Weekly	A
Los Angeles Times	2.5/4 stars

Just One Night is the fourth studio album by English singer Samantha Fox. It was released on 21 June 1991 by Jive Records. In addition to longtime collaborators Full Force, the album also features production from Robert Clivillés and David Cole of C+C Music Factory. The lead single, "(Hurt Me! Hurt Me!) But the Pants Stay On", had some radio airplay, but failed to receive much attention. The album's second single, "Another Woman (Too Many People)", remixed for radio, charted moderately in some continental European countries. The radio remix of "Another Woman (Too Many People)", along with the third single, "Just One Night", and fourth single, "Spirit of America", written by Mama's Boys member Pat McManus and featuring a guitar solo by Glenn Tipton of Judas Priest, were subsequently included on Fox's 1992 Greatest Hits album.

On 23 July 2012, the album was reissued as a two-disc deluxe edition by Cherry Red Records in the United Kingdom, including bonus tracks and remixes.

== Critical reception ==
Chuck Eddy from Entertainment Weekly gave the album an A, writing, "Who follows an insanely impudent single called ”(Hurt Me! Hurt Me!) But the Pants Stay On” with a medley of two of disco’s most X-rated hits ever (Andrea True Connection’s ”More, More, More” and Donna Summer’s ”Love to Love You Baby”)? Samantha Fox, a smart Cockney hussy, who ensures right off that we hear her fourth album, Just One Night, as a G-spot manifesto. She’s hilarious; Madonna should retire to a convent."

== Track listing ==
No.	Title	Writer(s)	Producer(s)	Length
1.	"(Hurt Me! Hurt Me!) But the Pants Stay On"	Full Force	Full Force	5:43
2.	"More, More, More/Love to Love You Baby Medley"	Gregory Diamond; Giorgio Moroder; Donna Summer; Peter Bellotte	Full Force	4:17
3.	"Don't Wait Up"	Full Force	Full Force; James Young^{[a]}; Liz Winstanley^{[a]}	4:12
4.	"Just One Night"	Full Force	Full Force	5:50
5.	"Pleasure Zone"	Robert Clivillés	Clivillés; David Cole	4:40
6.	"Another Woman (Too Many People)"	Ralf René Maué	Maué; Def Geoff Hunt^{[a]}	3:55
7.	"Don't Cry Wolf"	St. George	Eric Foster White	3:50
8.	"Nothing You Do, Nothing You Say"	Samantha Fox; Jon Durno	Nigel Green; Durno	4:12
9.	"Saving It Up"	Fox; Durno; Paul Taylor	Young; Taylor	3:19
10.	"Spirit of America"	Lol Mason; Pat MacManus; Philip Begley	Green; Durno	4:45
11.	"What You See Is What You Get"	Fox; Durno	White	3:28

Bonus track on select CD pressings
No.	Title	Writer(s)	Producer(s)	Length
12.	"Now I Lay Me Down"	Full Force	Full Force	4:36

Japanese edition bonus tracks
No.	Title	Writer(s)	Producer(s)	Length
12.	"Now I Lay Me Down"	Full Force	Full Force	4:36
13.	"(Hurt Me! Hurt Me!) But the Pants Stay On" (Pants Come Off mix)	Full Force	Full Force; The Shop Wreckers^{[a]}	5:43

2012 deluxe edition disc one (bonus tracks)
No.	Title	Writer(s)	Producer(s)	Length
12.	"Now I Lay Me Down"	Full Force	Full Force	4:35
13.	"Hot Lovin'"	Fox; Durno; Scott Addison; Ben Addison	Green; Durno	3:48
14.	"I Wanna Rock and Roll All Night"	Paul Stanley; Gene Simmons	White	3:37
15.	"Walking on Broken Glass"	Annie Lennox	Damon Rochefort	3:29
16.	"Go for the Heart" (original 1991 version)	Fox; Durno	Phil Harding; Ian Curnow	4:24
17.	"That's What Love Can Do"	Stock Aitken Waterman	Stock Aitken Waterman; Matt Pop^{[b]}	3:42
18.	"A Second Chance"	Stock Aitken Waterman	Stock Aitken Waterman; Matt Pop^{[b]}	3:45
19.	"Forever True"	Stock Aitken Waterman	Stock Aitken Waterman	3:06

2012 deluxe edition disc two
No.	Title	Writer(s)	Producer(s)	Length
1.	"Love to Love You Baby" (original version)	Moroder; Summer; Bellotte	Full Force	5:06
2.	"(Hurt Me! Hurt Me!) But the Pants Stay On" (DJ Pierre's remix)	Full Force	Full Force; DJ Pierre^{[a]}^{[b]}	6:40
3.	"Another Woman (Too Many People)" (Harding/Curnow 12″ version)	Maué	Maué; Harding^{[a]}^{[b]}; Curnow^{[a]}^{[b]}	7:34
4.	"That's What Love Can Do" (extended version)	Stock Aitken Waterman	Stock Aitken Waterman; Matt Pop^{[b]}	6:48
5.	"A Second Chance" (extended version)	Stock Aitken Waterman	Stock Aitken Waterman; Matt Pop^{[b]}	7:33
6.	"Now I Lay Me Down" (soundtrack version)	Full Force	Full Force	4:16
7.	"Don't Wait Up" (extended version)	Full Force	Full Force; Young^{[a]}; Winstanley^{[a]}	5:08
8.	"(Hurt Me! Hurt Me!) But the Pants Stay On" (The Pants Come Off mix)	Full Force	Full Force; The Shop Wreckers^{[a]}	6:27
9.	"Love to Love You Baby" (Lee's house mix)	Moroder; Summer; Bellotte	Full Force	4:45
10.	"Another Woman (Too Many People)" (Harding/Curnow rap version)	Maué	Maué; Harding^{[a]}^{[b]}; Curnow^{[a]}^{[b]}	3:58
11.	"(Hurt Me! Hurt Me!) But the Pants Stay On" (instrumental)	Full Force	Full Force	5:42
12.	"Love to Love You Baby" (Sleaze mix)	Moroder; Summer; Bellotte	Full Force	5:09
13.	"Just One Night" (radio edit)	Full Force	Full Force	3:56
14.	"Forever True" (instrumental)	Stock Aitken Waterman	Stock Aitken Waterman	3:06
15.	"Another Woman (Too Many People)" (Harding/Curnow instrumental)	Maué	Maué; Harding^{[a]}^{[b]}; Curnow^{[a]}^{[b]}	3:40

Notes

- ^{^[a]} signifies a remixer
- ^{^[b]} signifies an additional producer

== Personnel ==
Credits adapted from the liner notes of Just One Night.

=== Musicians ===
- Samantha Fox – vocals (all tracks); background vocals (tracks 7, 8, 11)
- Full Force – arrangement, the "Hurt Me" chants (track 1); music, background vocals (tracks 1–4)
- Alex "Spanador" Mosely – guitar (track 1)
- Ex-Girlfriend – background vocals (tracks 1–3); "Hurt Me" chants (track 1)
- Dana "The Dog" Loprieno – the "Hurt Me" chants (track 1)
- Marc "Long Carcass" Singleton – the "Hurt Me" chants (track 1)
- Tim "Jimmy Olsen" Latham – the "Hurt Me" chants (track 1)
- Eric Gast – the "Hurt Me" chants (track 1)
- Cheryl "Pepsi" Riley – background vocals (tracks 2, 3)
- Vincent Henry – saxophone solo (track 4)
- Robert Clivillés – arrangement, drums, percussion (track 5)
- David Cole – arrangement, keyboards (track 5)
- Alan Friedman – programming, additional drum programming (track 5)
- Paul Pesco – guitar (track 5)
- Deborah Cooper – background vocals (track 5)
- Martha Wash – background vocals (track 5)
- Craig Derry – background vocals (track 5)
- Audrey Wheeler – background vocals (track 5)
- Ralf René Maué – arrangement (track 6)
- Detlef Reshöft – keyboards, strings, sequencer, drum programming (track 6)
- Nils Tuxen – guitar (track 6)
- Rolf Köhler – background vocals (track 6)
- Madeleine Lang – background vocals (track 6)
- Michael Scholz – background vocals (track 6)
- Marion Schwaiger – background vocals (track 6)
- Eric Foster White – keyboards, drum programming (tracks 7, 11); arrangement (track 11)
- Nunzio Signore – guitar (track 7)
- Tim Cashion – background vocals (tracks 7, 11)
- Jon Durno – keyboards, guitar (track 8); bass (track 10)
- Mark Sayfritz – keyboards, programming (tracks 8, 10)
- Maggie Ryder – background vocals (tracks 8, 10)
- Randall Waller – background vocals (track 8)
- Paul Taylor – keyboards, programming (track 9)
- Lol Ford – guitar (track 9)
- Lauraine McIntosh – background vocals (track 9)
- Chris Marshall – keyboards, programming (track 10)
- Glenn Tipton – guitar solo (track 10)
- Jeffrey Rose – guitar (track 10)
- Martyn Ford – drums (track 10)
- Nigel Rush – background vocals (track 10)
- Joshua Michael Grau – guitars (track 11)

=== Technical ===
- Full Force – production, mixing (tracks 1–4)
- Tony Maserati – mixing, engineering (tracks 1–4)
- Dana Loprieno – engineering assistance (track 1)
- Pete Christensen – mix engineering assistance (track 1); editing (track 2); engineering assistance (track 7)
- Danny Mormando – engineering assistance (track 2)
- Michael Scalcione – engineering assistance (track 3)
- James Young – remix, remix engineering (track 3); production, engineering (track 9)
- Liz Winstanley – remix (track 3)
- Anthony Saunders – engineering assistance (track 4)
- Robert Clivillés – production, mixing (track 5)
- David Cole – production, mixing (track 5)
- Acar S. Key – engineering, mix engineering (track 5)
- Alec Head – engineering (track 5)
- Ricky Crespo – edits (track 5)
- Ralf René Maué – production, mixing (track 6)
- Detlef Reshöft – mixing (track 6)
- Def Geoff Hunt – remix (track 6); engineering (tracks 8, 10)
- Eric Foster White – production, engineering (tracks 7, 11)
- Mike Allaire – mixing (tracks 7, 11)
- Tom Vercillo – engineering (track 7)
- Chris Floberg – engineering (tracks 7, 11)
- Tim Latham – engineering assistance (tracks 7, 11)
- Will Tartak – engineering assistance (track 7); engineering (track 11)
- Jim Munn – engineering assistance (track 7); engineering (track 11)
- Nigel Green – production (tracks 8, 10)
- Jon Durno – production (tracks 8, 10)
- Paul Taylor – production (track 9)
- José Rodriguez – mastering

=== Artwork ===
- Joe Grant – photography
- Zombart JK – design
- Diana Merkel – calligraphy

== Charts ==
Chart (1991)	Peak position
Australian Albums (ARIA)	167
Canada Top Albums/CDs (RPM)	55
Japanese Albums (Oricon)	92
