= (Hurt Me! Hurt Me!) But the Pants Stay On =

1991 song by Samantha Fox

Single by Samantha Fox

from the album Just One Night
- Released: 1991
- Genre: Dance; house
- Length: 4:06 (Radio Edit); 5:45 (LP version)
- Label: Jive
- Songwriter: Full Force
- Producer: Full Force

Samantha Fox singles chronology
"I Only Want to Be with You" (1989)	"(Hurt Me! Hurt Me!) But the Pants Stay On" (1991)	"Santa Maria" (1997)

Music video
- "(Hurt Me! Hurt Me!) But the Pants Stay On" on YouTube

"(Hurt Me! Hurt Me!) But the Pants Stay On" is a song performed by British singer Samantha Fox. It was written and produced by Full Force, and released in 1991 as the first single from Fox' fourth album, Just One Night (1991).

A music video was produced to promote the single, directed by American director Jim Swaffield. Fox personally selected a then-unknown Jennifer Lopez as a dancer in the video.

The singer initially objected to the "hurt me, hurt me" lyric when first presented with the song by Full Force. She was concerned that the line — which referenced a New York club chant used by patrons calling for more bass — would be misunderstood as something sexually violent. Her fears were realised, when some radio stations in America refused to play the song, believing it to be about S&M. Fox instead insisted the song was actually attacking the expectation by some men that a woman should sleep with her date in exchange for a night out.

Fox blamed the track's lack of chart success in America on record label politics and a lack of promotion, after BMG declined to extend its distribution deal with her UK record company, Jive Records.

== Critical reception ==
Larry Flick from Billboard magazine wrote, "Naughty girl seems to be having almost too much fun on this titillating house teaser that revolves around whether or not Fox is going to keep her drawers on. In collaborating with Full Force the singer once again finds all the right buttons to push and has come up with yet another controversial hit that will be crossing over to top-40 radio in no time flat." Another editor declared the song as a "safe-sex anthem". Chuck Eddy from Entertainment Weekly viewed it as "an insanely impudent single". Pan-European magazine Music & Media found that it's "less poppy than her previous singles and featuring a heavy dance beat."

== Track listings ==
- CD maxi, US
1. "(Hurt Me! Hurt Me!) But the Pants Stay On" (LP Version) — 5:45
2. "(Hurt Me! Hurt Me!) But the Pants Stay On" (Radio Edit - Sam Talks) — 4:06
3. "(Hurt Me! Hurt Me!) But the Pants Stay On" (The Pants Come Off Mix) — 6:29
4. "(Hurt Me! Hurt Me!) But the Pants Come Off" (DJ Pierre's Remix) — 6:45
5. "(Hurt Me! Hurt Me!) But the Pants Stay On" (Instrumental) — 5:45
6. "Hot Lovin'" — 3:48

== Charts ==
Chart (1991)	Peak position
Australia (ARIA)	123
