= Cave Painting =

British alternative rock band

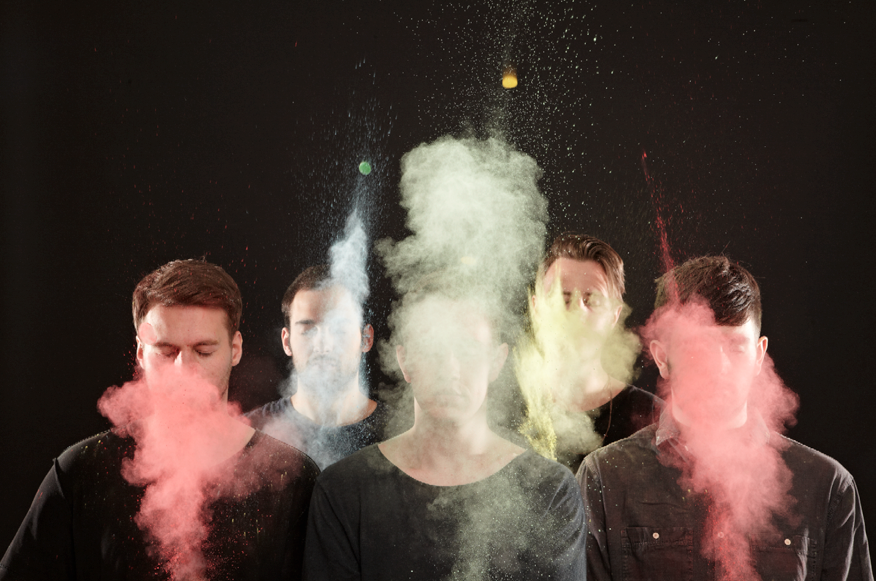

Background information
- Origin: Brighton, UK
- Genres: Alternative rock
- Years active: 2010–2013
- Label: Third Rock
- Past members: Adam Kane; Sam Simon; Harry Smallwood; Richard Snabel; Jonathan McCawley

Cave Painting were an alternative rock band from Brighton, UK, who formed in 2010 and were signed to Third Rock Recordings. They released the singles "So Calm", as well as their debut EP, You'll Be Running Soon in 2011, featuring "Midnight Love", "Rio" and two other songs. They also released a demo of their song "Leaf" as a free download on social network sites.

Their album Votive Life was released by Third Rock Recordings on 24 September 2012.

Band members included lead vocalist Adam Kane, keyboardist Sam Simon, guitarist Harry Smallwood, bassist Richard Snabel and drummer Jonathan McCawley. Kane now releases music under the name Sad Funeral.
