= Angel with an Attitude =

Studio album by Samantha Fox
- Released: 18 October 2005
- Genre: Rock, electronica, dance
- Length: 51:22
- Label: La Chappelle; Fox
- Producer: Samantha Fox, et al

Samantha Fox chronology
21st Century Fox (1997)	Angel with an Attitude (2005)	Greatest Hits (2009)

Angel with an Attitude is the sixth studio album released by British recording artist Samantha Fox.

== Album information ==
Angel with an Attitude was Fox's first studio album in seven years, following 1998's 21st Century Fox. Fox wrote "Angel with an Attitude" after a trying court case with her father, Patrick Fox, who had embezzled over £1 million from her accounts. Fox describes the title track as one of the deepest songs she ever wrote.

Fox's new manager, Myra Stratton, encouraged her to take a two-year break from music during which time Fox wrote the rest of the album, gaining inspiration from her growing relationship with Stratton. In the course of working on her autobiography, Fox realized that she had crossed an important chapter in her life, and began to commit her life stories to verse. According to Fox the lyrics "show my weakness, joy, moments of total euphoria, but also sadness. These words simply flowed from my heart." The songs reflect her despondency over past troubles as well as her ambition to overcome. The work was a progression from her earlier, less serious recordings as Fox sought to apply her experiences as a mature woman to the album. As a result, she says, this album comes the closest to reflecting who she really is.

Fox describes the album as a "blend of rock with electronic sounds". She recorded it in Montreal for Canadian label La Chapelle.

To promote the album, Fox filmed a music video for title track in Montreal. The clip features Fox dressed as an angel in a church. The video debuted on Canadian music channel MusiMax.

The album includes a bonus track called "Time", a UK garage song produced by EEDB that features The Flirtations. This number was originally released without Fox's vocals in 2003.

The album was released on CD in Australia & New Zealand in 2007 with a remix of Fox's 1986 hit "Touch Me" added as another bonus. This version became available to download internationally in February 2009.

On 28 January 2009 Fox digitally released a collection of five remixes from the album.

== Track listings ==
Angel with an Attitude
No.	Title	Music	Length
1.	"Angel with an Attitude"	Fox, Myra Stratton	3:23
2.	"To Be Heard"	Stratton, Fox	3:58
3.	"Destined to Be"	Butcher, Harrington, Fox,	3:50
4.	"I Give Myself to You"	Hammon, Bruce Elliott-Smith, Decio, Fox,	3:50
5.	"The Power"	Fox, Stratton	3:51
6.	"You and Me"	Fox, Stratton	3:35
7.	"Threw Our Love Away"	Bonacchi, Fox	3:24
8.	"Move Me"	Butcher, Fox, Harrington	4:29
9.	"Breathe"	Samantha Fox, Larry Lush, Wayne Frost, Stratton	5:18
10.	"Nice and Slow"	Fox, Andrew Galea, Elliott-Smith, Lush, Phil Larsen	3:29
11.	"Cause an Effect"	Fox, Stratton	3:08
12.	"Dreams Unfold"	Fox, Greene, McLaughlin	3:22
13.	"Time" (featuring The Flirtations) (Bonus)	EEDB, Fox, Bielig, Ellis	4:29
14.	"Touch Me 2007" (Bonus)	Santiago Cortes	3:55

Angel with an Attitude Remixes EP
No.	Title	Music	Length
1.	"Angel with an Attitude" (Extended remix)	Fox, Stratton	5:21
2.	"I Give Myself to You" (Pete Hammond remix)	Hammon, Elliott-Smith, Decio, Fox,	5:11
3.	"You and Me" (Extended remix)	Fox, Stratton	8:51
4.	"To Be Heard" (Extended remix)	Stratton, Fox	7:38
5.	"Nice and Slow" (Extended remix)	Fox, Galea, Elliott-Smith, Lush, Larsen	9:00

== Personnel ==
- Joe Barrucco – synthesizer, arranger, vocals, producer, engineer, mixing, instrumentation
- Eli Batalion – synthesizer, bass, guitar, piano
- Michelle Burraine – vocals
- Eric Cóté – graphic design
- Natalie Cummings – vocals
- Samantha Fox – producer
- Joe Barrucco - producer
- Georges Dutil - photographer
