= I Promise You (Get Ready) =

Single by Samantha Fox

from the album Samantha Fox
- B-side: "Suzie, Don't Leave Me with Your Boyfriend"
- Released: 5 October 1987
- Studio: Battery Studios (London)
- Genre: Dance
- Length: 3:52
- Label: Jive
- Songwriter(s): Oscar Van Geldern
- Producer(s): Steve Lovell; Steve Power

Samantha Fox singles chronology
"I Surrender (To the Spirit of the Night)" (1987)	"I Promise You (Get Ready)" (1987)	"True Devotion" (1987)

Music video
- "I Promise You" on YouTube

Professional ratings
Review scores
Source	Rating
Number One	1/5 stars

"I Promise You (Get Ready)" is a song by the English pop singer Samantha Fox from her eponymous second studio album (1987). It was released in October 1987 as the album's third single. The song was written by Oscar Van Geldern, and produced by Steve Lovell and Steve Power.

The single's B-side, "Suzie, Don't Leave Me with Your Boyfriend", previously appeared on Fox's debut studio album, Touch Me (1986).

The song became Fox's seventh consecutive single to reach the UK top 60, although it was the lowest-charting of the seven, peaking at number 58 on the UK Singles Chart. In Germany, the song peaked at number 40, becoming her sixth top-40 entry there.

== Track listings ==
- 7-inch single

A. "I Promise You (Get Ready)" – 3:52
B. "Suzie, Don't Leave Me with Your Boyfriend" – 3:54

- 12-inch single

A. "I Promise You (Get Ready)" (extended version) – 5:56
B1. "Suzie, Don't Leave Me with Your Boyfriend" – 3:54
B2. "I Promise You (Get Ready)" (instrumental) – 4:16

== Charts ==
Chart (1987)	Peak position
Spain (AFYVE)	12
UK Singles (OCC)	58
West Germany (GfK)	40
