= Santa Maria (Tatjana song) =

1995 single by Tatjana

Single by Tatjana
- Released: 1995; 1996 (re-release)
- Genre: Eurodance; Eurodisco; dance-pop; house
- Length: 3:18
- Label: Mega; Love This; Popular
- Songwriters: Kirsti Johansen; Kjetil Røsnes; Michael Stock; Matt Aitken
- Producers: Michael Stock; Matt Aitken

Tatjana singles chronology
"Never Never" (1993)	"Santa Maria" (1995)	"Tatjana's Double Deal" (1995)

Music video
- "Santa Maria" on YouTube

"Santa Maria"

Single by DJ Milano feat. Samantha Fox
- Released: 1997
- Genre: Eurodance
- Length: 2:54
- Label: All Around the World; Scandinavian
- Songwriters: Kirsti Johansen; Kjetil Røsnes; Michael Stock; Matt Aitken
- Producers: Lee Monteverde; Peter King

Samantha Fox singles chronology
"(Hurt Me! Hurt Me!) But the Pants Stay On" (1991)	"Santa Maria" (1997)	"Tomorrow (Is Another Day)" (2009)

Music video
- "Santa Maria" on YouTube

"Santa Maria" is a song originally released in 1995 by Croatian-Dutch artist and model Tatjana. It was written by Kirsti Johansen and Kjetil Røsnes of Norwegian disco and dance duo Avalanche with Mike Stock and Matt Aitken, two former members of the Stock Aitken Waterman production trio. The song was recorded for the European market, although Tatjana's version was issued in the US on Popular Records as a CD maxi single. It was covered by DJ Milano and British singer Samantha Fox in 1997.

== Critical reception ==
John Bush from AllMusic described the song as a "house anthem". Larry Flick from Billboard magazine wrote, "The Euro-NRG dance music invasion of stateside pop radio airwaves continues with the onset of this riotous anthem, which has already connected with kids everywhere else in the world. If you look beyond the "ya don't stop" rap cliches in the verses, you will encounter a wonder-fully peppy, sing-along chorus that is impossible to shake from the brain."

British Music Week gave it a score of four out of five, adding, "Vibe up your holiday memories with this Euro-anthem from the Croatian, courtesy of the golden hands of Stock & Aitken." Music Week editor Alan Jones noted, "A Euro-style, instantly commercial, summery groove, it boasts a KLF-style rap and a bright pop/dance vocal, with the title phrase borrowing its musical notation from Zucchero's 'Senza una donna'." On the 1996 re-release, Music Week gave it a full score of five out of five and named it Single of the Week, describing it as "Euro disco at its very best with the fun factor in full effect." James Hamilton from the Record Mirror Dance Update named it "an infectious breezy Whigfield-ish jangling galloper" in his weekly dance column.

== Chart hyping allegation ==
The version of the song which was released on Mike Stock's Love This Records label in the United Kingdom was investigated by the BPI, as it was suspected that the company was involved in chart hyping in order to get the record into the UK Singles chart. The single was excluded from the charts, whilst a number of other releases from Love This Records had sales deducted from their overall weekly totals. Nevertheless, "Santa Maria" reached number 40 in the UK charts for one week when re-issued in 1996, with Stock going on to record a version of a 1970s hit "You Can Do Magic" in 1997, for an investigation on ITV programme The Cook Report to see how easy it was the rig the charts.

== DJ Milano/Samantha Fox version ==
After Fox's five-year contract with Jive Records expired, the singer went to Ibiza, where she met DJ Milano, who decided to use her vocals on a cover of "Santa Maria" in 1997. "Santa Maria" became a notable hit around Europe, peaking at number 14 in Denmark and had a music video was directed by Ben Hume-Paton. In the United Kingdom, it charted higher in the Official Singles Chart than the version by Simić and when it got to number 31 in 1998, it became Fox's first chart entry under her own name since 1989 (as her 1995 Song For Europe entry "Go for the Heart" was credited under the group name Sox). It was released as a single-only song and was later included on Fox's Watching You, Watching Me compilation. The song also appeared on her 2009 Greatest Hits compilation alongside her 1980s hits and "Go for the Heart".

Music Week gave the song two out of five, writing, "This Euro-dance tune could signal a return to the charts for the page three girl turned born-again Christian."

== Track listing ==
1. "Santa Maria" (Radio Edit) – 2:54
2. "Santa Maria" (Open Arms Remix) – 6:19
3. "Santa Maria" (Gio Remix) – 5:04
4. "Santa Maria" (Original Version) – 6:11

== Charts ==
=== Tatjana version ===
==== Weekly charts ====
Chart (1995)	Peak position
Netherlands (Dutch Top 40)	33
Netherlands (Single Top 100)	37
Scotland (OCC)	76
UK Singles (OCC)	90
UK Pop Tip Club Chart (Music Week)	4

Chart (1996)	Peak position
Australia (ARIA)	50
Canada Dance/Urban (RPM)	10
Scotland (OCC)	30
UK Singles (Official Charts)	40
UK Pop Tip Club Chart (Music Week)	4

==== Year-end charts ====
Chart (1995)	Position
UK Pop Tip Club Chart (Music Week)	30

=== Samantha Fox version ===
Chart (1997)	Peak position
Denmark (IFPI)	14
Scotland (OCC)	29
Sweden (Sverigetopplistan)	47
UK Singles (OCC)	31
