= Samantha Fox (album) =

1987 studio album by Samantha Fox

Studio album by Samantha Fox
- Released: 20 July 1987
- Recorded: 1987
- Studios: Battery Studios (London) (Note: Except "Nothing's Gonna Stop Me Now"); PWL (London) (Note: "Nothing's Gonna Stop Me Now")
- Genres: Dance-pop; freestyle
- Length: 45:49
- Label: Jive
- Producers: Timmy Allen; Jon Astrop; Full Force; Steve Lovell; Steve Power; Stock Aitken Waterman

Samantha Fox chronology
Touch Me (1986)	Samantha Fox (1987)	I Wanna Have Some Fun (1988)

Singles from Samantha Fox
- 1. "Nothing's Gonna Stop Me Now" Released: May 1987; 2. "I Surrender (To the Spirit of the Night)" Released: July 1987; 3. "I Promise You (Get Ready)" Released: October 1987; 4. "True Devotion" Released: December 1987; 5. "Naughty Girls (Need Love Too)" Released: February 1988

Professional ratings
Review scores
Source	Rating
AllMusic	3/5 stars
Smash Hits	6/10

Samantha Fox is the second studio album by the English pop singer Samantha Fox, released in July 1987 by Jive Records. The album charted at number 22 in the United Kingdom, number 51 in the United States, number 41 in Canada, number 86 in Australia and number 16 in Germany.

After her debut studio album, Touch Me (1986), went gold, Fox returned to the studio to record her eponymous second album. Emerging English songwriting and record production trio Stock Aitken Waterman were enlisted to contribute one track, "Nothing's Gonna Stop Me Now", after her label reportedly became concerned the album did not contain any obvious hits. However, US producers Full Force, who were helping Lisa Lisa at that time, also delivered a top 5 US hit for the album with "Naughty Girls (Need Love Too)". The album also spawned the singles "I Surrender (To the Spirit of the Night)", "I Promise You (Get Ready)", and "True Devotion".

Jim Lea and Noddy Holder (of the English rock band Slade) wrote and demoed the song "Shooting Me Down" for the album after being approached by Jive. However, Fox never recorded the song as there was not enough time to do so before the album's release date.

== Track listing ==
=== European, Australian and Japanese edition ===
Side one
No.	Title	Writer(s)	Producer(s)	Length
1.	"(I Can't Get No) Satisfaction"	Mick Jagger; Keith Richards	Timmy Allen	5:36
2.	"I Surrender (To the Spirit of the Night)"	Jon Astrop; Karen Moline; Mark Shreeve	Astrop	3:56
3.	"I Promise You"	Oscar Van Geldern	Steve Lovell; Steve Power	3:54
4.	"Naughty Girls"	Full Force	Full Force	5:10
5.	"True Devotion"	Shreeve; Lol Mason	Lovell; Power	4:37

Side two
No.	Title	Writer(s)	Producer(s)	Length
6.	"Nothing's Gonna Stop Me Now"	Stock Aitken Waterman	Stock Aitken Waterman	3:43
7.	"If Music Be the Food of Love"	Astrop	Astrop	4:49
8.	"That Sensation"	Hamish MacDonald; Simon Bailey	Lovell; Power	4:19
9.	"Dream City"	Mason; Steve Barnacle	Lovell; Power	4:55
10.	"The Best Is Yet to Come"	Andy McCoy	Lovell; Power	4:50

European CD and UK cassette bonus tracks
No.	Title	Writer(s)	Producer(s)	Length
11.	"Want You to Want Me"	Steve Lambert; Steve Byrd	Lovell; Power	3:29
12.	"Rockin' in the City"	Brian Bonhomme; Rod Nash; Jon Durno	Lovell	3:29

Japanese CD bonus track
No.	Title	Writer(s)	Producer(s)	Length
11.	"Nothing's Gonna Stop Me Now" (extended)	Stock Aitken Waterman	Stock Aitken Waterman	7:05

=== US and Canadian edition ===
Side one
No.	Title	Writer(s)	Producer(s)	Length
1.	"I Surrender (To the Spirit of the Night)"	Astrop; Moline; Shreeve	Astrop	3:56
2.	"I Promise You"	Van Geldern	Lovell; Power	3:54
3.	"Naughty Girls"	Full Force	Full Force	5:10
4.	"True Devotion"	Shreeve; Mason	Lovell; Power	4:37
5.	"(I Can't Get No) Satisfaction"	Jagger; Richards	Allen	5:36

Side two
No.	Title	Writer(s)	Producer(s)	Length
6.	"Nothing's Gonna Stop Me Now"	Stock Aitken Waterman	Stock Aitken Waterman	3:43
7.	"If Music Be the Food of Love"	Astrop	Astrop	4:49
8.	"That Sensation"	MacDonald; Bailey	Lovell; Power	4:19
9.	"Dream City"	Mason; Barnacle	Lovell; Power	4:55
10.	"The Best Is Yet to Come"	McCoy	Lovell; Power	4:50

2009 CD reissue bonus tracks
No.	Title	Writer(s)	Producer(s)	Length
1.	Untitled			5:29
11.	"Even in the Darkest Hours"	Tim Burgess; John Forgie	Lovell; Power
12.	"All I Wanna Do..." (with Full Force) (single mix)	Full Force	Full Force	4:14
13.	"Naughty Girls (Need Love Too)" (special extended mix)	Full Force	Full Force	5:52
14.	"Nothing's Gonna Stop Me Now" (extended version)	Stock Aitken Waterman	Stock Aitken Waterman	7:02
15.	"True Devotion" (new mix)	Shreeve; Mason	Lovell; Power	4:35
16.	"I Surrender (To the Spirit of the Night)" (extended remix)	Astrop; Moline; Shreeve	Astrop	6:35

2012 deluxe edition disc one (bonus tracks)
No.	Title	Writer(s)	Producer(s)	Length
11.	"Even in the Darkest Hours" (extended mix)	Burgess; Forgie	Lovell; Power	7:29
12.	"The Right Stuff"	Lacksley Castell; Tania N. Williams	Lovell; Power	3:59
13.	"Hot Tonight"	Eric Beall	Astrop	4:06
14.	"I Surrender (To the Spirit of the Night)" (original remix)	Astrop; Moline; Shreeve	Astrop	4:56
15.	"Nothing's Gonna Stop Me Now" (Jump & Jive mix)	Stock Aitken Waterman	Stock Aitken Waterman; Pete Hammond^{[a]}	5:21
16.	"(I Can't Get No) Satisfaction" (Bastone radio mix)	Jagger; Richards	Allen; Freddy Bastone^{[a]}	4:21
17.	"Naughty Girls (Need Love Too)" (Jon's Savage edit)	Full Force	Full Force^{[b]}; Tony Maserati^{[a]}	3:14

2012 deluxe edition disc two
No.	Title	Writer(s)	Producer(s)	Length
1.	"Nothing's Gonna Stop Me Now" (extended version)	Stock Aitken Waterman	Stock Aitken Waterman	5:57
2.	"I Surrender (To the Spirit of the Night)" (extended version)	Astrop; Moline; Shreeve	Astrop	6:37
3.	"I Promise You (Get Ready)" (extended version)	Van Geldern	Lovell; Power	5:57
4.	"Naughty Girls (Need Love Too)" (special extended version)	Full Force	Full Force^{[b]}; Maserati^{[a]}	5:53
5.	"(I Can't Get No) Satisfaction" (extended version)	Jagger; Richards	Allen	7:23
6.	"I Promise You (Get Ready)" (Stan Shaw mix)	Van Geldern	Lovell; Power; Stan Shaw^{[a]}	6:00
7.	"Nothing's Gonna Stop Me Now" (club mix)	Stock Aitken Waterman	Stock Aitken Waterman; Jerry Peal^{[a]}	7:00
8.	"Naughty Girls (Need Love Too)" (Full Force Naughty House mix)	Full Force	Full Force^{[b]}; Maserati^{[a]}	6:36
9.	"(I Can't Get No) Satisfaction" (She's Gotta Have It mix)	Jagger; Richards	Allen; Bastone^{[a]}	6:57
10.	"I Surrender (To the Spirit of the Night)" (12″ remix)	Astrop; Moline; Shreeve	Astrop; Geoff Hunt^{[a]}	6:55
11.	"Nothing's Gonna Stop Me Now" (instrumental)	Stock Aitken Waterman	Stock Aitken Waterman	3:45
12.	"I Surrender (To the Spirit of the Night)" (instrumental)	Astrop; Moline; Shreeve	Astrop	5:02
13.	"I Promise You (Get Ready)" (instrumental)	Van Geldern	Lovell; Power	4:12

Notes

- ^{^[a]} signifies a remixer
- ^{^[b]} signifies a main producer and remixer

== Charts ==
=== Weekly charts ===
Chart (1987–1988)	Peak position
Australian Albums (Kent Music Report)	86
Austrian Albums (Ö3 Austria)	12
Canada Top Albums/CDs (RPM)	41
Dutch Albums (Album Top 100)	32
European Albums (Music & Media)	12
Finnish Albums (Suomen virallinen lista)	3
French Albums (IFOP)	21
Italian Albums(Musica e dischi)	14
German Albums (Offizielle Top 100)	16
Norwegian Albums (VG-lista)	3
Swedish Albums (Sverigetopplistan)	14
Swiss Albums (Schweizer Hitparade)	3
UK Albums (Official Charts)	22
US Billboard 200	51

=== Year-end charts ===
Chart (1987)	Position
Swiss Albums (Schweizer Hitparade)	30

== Certifications ==
Region	Certification	Certified units/sales
Canada (Music Canada)	Platinum	100,000^{^}
Finland (Musiikkituottajat)	Diamond	50,000
France (SNEP)	Gold	100,000^{*}
Norway (IFPI Norway)	Gold	25,000^{*}
Spain (Promusicae)	Gold	50,000^{^}
Switzerland (IFPI Switzerland)	Gold	25,000^{^}
United States (RIAA)	Gold	500,000^{^}
^{*} Sales figures based on certification alone.^{^} Shipments figures based on certification alone.
