= Naughty Girls (Need Love Too) =

1988 single by Samantha Fox

Single by Samantha Fox

from the album Samantha Fox
- B-side: "Dream City"
- Released: February 1988
- Genre: Freestyle
- Length: 5:10 (album version); 4:20 (7-inch version)
- Label: Jive
- Songwriters: Curt Bedeau; Gerry Charles; Hugh L Clarke; Brian George; Lucien George; Paul George
- Producer: Full Force

Samantha Fox singles chronology
"True Devotion" (1987)	"Naughty Girls (Need Love Too)" (1988)	"Love House" (1988)

"Naughty Girls (Need Love Too)" is a song by English singer Samantha Fox from her self-titled second studio album (1987). It was released as a single in 1988 by Jive Records and was a collaboration between Fox and US hip-hop group Full Force. It describes how a "naughty girl" has unexpectedly fallen in love. With the song initially presented to Fox in a less melodic form, she insisted on the addition of guitar. Her producers were at first reluctant to comply, but later added the distinctive guitar sound with the use of a Fairlight.

In the United States, "Naughty Girls" peaked at No. 3 on the Billboard Hot 100 chart and was ranked as the 28th-most-popular song of that year. It was also a top-10 hit in New Zealand. It became Fox's first song to not reach the top 10 in Finland, peaking in the top 20 there as well as in Canada. In Fox's native country, it peaked at number 31 on the UK Singles Chart. The Full Force Naughty House Mix contains a sample of Boney M.'s "Ma Baker".

== Critical reception ==
In his review of "Naughty Girls (Need Love Too)", J.D. Considine from the Baltimore Sun described it as "not so much a song as a T-shirt with a rhythm section." Kris Kirk from Melody Maker stated, "It's US Top 10 with a bullet and will probably be her biggest seller here too." Pan-European magazine Music & Media wrote, "Riding high in the American Billboard charts (no. 3 at press time), this Full Force production is straight to the point. A nervous, walloping beat is set next to Fox's bubbling vocals, giving it precisely that extra it needed." John Leland of Spin said the song was, "advanced Svengali-ism: a song that demeans the singer. This is a great pop single, as temporary and tacky as you could want it to be."

== Music video ==
The single's music video features Fox with pink hair and a leather jacket in front of a graffiti-covered building. She is surrounded by street toughs who join Fox in a dance routine. The members of Full Force are shown providing backing vocals.

== Track listing ==
- US maxi-single (1102-2-JDJ) Jive
1. "Naughty Girls (Need Love Too)" (Single Edit) 4:20
2. "Naughty Girls (Need Love Too)" (U.K. Mix) 4:10
3. "Naughty Girls (Need Love Too)" (Full Force Naughty House Mix) 6:34
4. "Naughty Girls (Need Love Too)" (Special Extended Version) 5:52
- Canadian vinyl 7-inch (1089-7-J) Jive
1. "Naughty Girls (Need Love Too)" (Full Force Mix) 4:20
2. "Dream City" 4:55
- UK vinyl 12-inch (FOXY T 9) Jive
1. "Naughty Girls (Need Love Too)" (Special Extended Version) 5:52
2. "Naughty Girls (Need Love Too)" (Jon's Savage Edit) 3:13
3. "Dream City" 4:52

== Charts ==
=== Weekly charts ===
Chart (1988)	Peak position
Australia (ARIA)	64
Belgium (Ultratop 50 Flanders)	28
Canada Top Singles (RPM)	11
Europe (European Hot 100 Singles)	53
Finland (Suomen virallinen lista)	13
Ireland (IRMA)	24
Netherlands (Single Top 100)	64
New Zealand (Recorded Music NZ)	8
Quebec (ADISQ)	11
Spain (AFYVE)	21
UK Singles (Official Charts)	31
US Billboard Hot 100	3
US 12-inch Singles Sales (Billboard) Remix with "I Surrender"	1
US Dance Club Play (Billboard) Remix with "I Surrender"	9
US Cash Box Top 100	4
West Germany (GfK)	21

=== Year-end charts ===
Chart (1988)	Position
Canada Top Singles (RPM)	90
US Billboard Hot 100	28
US 12-inch Singles Sales (Billboard)	6
US Cash Box Top 100	44

== Release history ==
Region	Date	Format(s)	Label(s)	Ref.
United States	February 1988	—N/a	Jive	
United Kingdom	3 May 1988	7-inch vinyl; 12-inch vinyl	Jive	
