= I Wanna Have Some Fun =

Studio album by Samantha Fox
- Released: November 1988 (US); 6 February 1989 (UK)
- Studios: Battery, London, UK; Bolland, Blaricum, Netherlands; PWL, London, UK; Sigma Sound, New York City
- Length: 50:58
- Label: Jive
- Producers: Full Force; Steve Lovell; Thomas Pantano; Steve Power; Rob and Ferdi Bolland; Kevin Saunderson; Jolyon Skinner; Stock Aitken Waterman; Chris Tsangarides; Fred Zarr

Samantha Fox chronology
Samantha Fox (1987)	I Wanna Have Some Fun (1988)	Just One Night (1991)

Singles from I Wanna Have Some Fun
- 1. "Love House" Released: October 1988 (EU); 2. "I Wanna Have Some Fun" Released: October 1988 (US); 3. "I Only Wanna Be with You" Released: January 1989

Professional ratings
Review scores
Source	Rating
AllMusic	2/5 stars
New Musical Express	3/10 stars
Record Mirror	1/5 stars

I Wanna Have Some Fun is the third studio album by English singer Samantha Fox. It was released in November 1988 by Jive Records. The album features production from previous collaborators Full Force, Stock Aitken Waterman, Steve Power and Steve Lovell, as well as new collaborators, such as Rob and Ferdi Bolland, Kevin Saunderson, Fred Zarr and Chris Tsangarides.

== Singles ==
"Love House" was released in November 1988 as the album's first single in the United Kingdom, reaching number 32 on the UK Singles Chart. The album's title track served as the first single in the United States, where it peaked at number eight on the Billboard Hot 100, while it was released as the third and final single in the UK in June 1989, reaching number 63. The album's second UK single, a cover of Dusty Springfield's "I Only Want to Be with You" (retitled "I Only Wanna Be with You"), was released in January 1989 and became Fox's best-performing single in over a year, peaking at number 16 on the UK chart. It was also the second single in the US, where it peaked at number 31 on the Billboard Hot 100. "Love House", on its release as the third and final single in the US, failed to reach the top 100.

== Track listing ==
No.	Title	Writer(s)	Producer(s)	Length
1.	"I Wanna Have Some Fun"	Full Force	Full Force	5:00
2.	"Love House"	Rob Bolland; Ferdi Bolland	Rob and Ferdi Bolland	4:34
3.	"Your House or My House"	Jolyon Skinner; Chris Marshall	Skinner; Kevin Saunderson	3:54
4.	"Next to Me"	Full Force	Full Force	5:24
5.	"Ready for This Love"	Shelly Peiken	Fred Zarr	4:19
6.	"Confession"	Samantha Fox; Lol Mason; Mark Shreeve	Steve Power; Steve Lovell	4:36
7.	"I Only Wanna Be with You"	Ivor Raymonde; Michael Hawker	Stock Aitken Waterman	2:44
8.	"You Started Something"	Stock Aitken Waterman	Stock Aitken Waterman	3:21
9.	"One in a Million"	R. Bolland; F. Bolland	Rob and Ferdi Bolland	4:34
10.	"Walking on Air"	Mike Bissell	Zarr	4:09
11.	"Hot for You"	Eric Beall	Chris Tsangarides	4:11
12.	"Out of Our Hands"	Shreeve; Mason	Power; Lovell	4:12

2009 CD reissue bonus tracks
No.	Title	Writer(s)	Producer(s)	Length
13.	"Don't Cheat on Me"	Fox; Mason; Shreeve	Tsangarides	3:05
14.	"Lovin' Don't Grow on Trees"	Full Force	Full Force	4:09
15.	"Now I Lay Me Down"	Full Force	Full Force	4:17
16.	"I Wanna Have Some Fun" (extended version)	Full Force	Full Force	5:10
17.	"Love House" (The Black Pyramid mix)	R. Bolland; F. Bolland	Rob and Ferdi Bolland	6:42
18.	"I Only Wanna Be with You" (extended mix)	Raymonde; Hawker	Stock Aitken Waterman	4:59

2012 deluxe edition disc one (bonus tracks)
No.	Title	Writer(s)	Producer(s)	Length
13.	"Don't Cheat on Me"	Fox; Mason; Shreeve	Tsangarides	3:05
14.	"Lovin' Don't Grow on Trees"	Full Force	Full Force	4:09
15.	"All I Wanna Do..." (with Full Force) (single edit)	Full Force	Full Force	4:14
16.	"Too Late to Say Goodbye"	Stock Aitken Waterman	Stock Aitken Waterman	3:24
17.	"Giving Me a Hard Time"	Mike Gallagher; Julian Gallagher; Robert Hunter	Adam Fuest; Lovell	2:48
18.	"Shout It Out"		Zarr	4:37
19.	"Ready for This Love" (7″ mix)	Peiken	Zarr	4:01

2012 deluxe edition disc two
No.	Title	Writer(s)	Producer(s)	Length
1.	"Love House" (The Black Pyramid mix)	R. Bolland; F. Bolland	Rob and Ferdi Bolland	6:42
2.	"Your House or My House" (extended version)	Skinner; Marshall	Skinner; Saunderson	6:00
3.	"I Only Wanna Be with You" (extended version)	Raymonde; Hawker	Stock Aitken Waterman	5:53
4.	"I Wanna Have Some Fun" (extended version)	Full Force	Full Force	5:10
5.	"Lovin' Don't Grow on Trees" (extended version)	Full Force	Full Force	5:39
6.	"Love House" (The Chicago House Jam mix)	R. Bolland; F. Bolland	Rob and Ferdi Bolland; Wayne Williams^{[a]}	5:28
7.	"I Only Wanna Be with You" (12″ mix)	Raymonde; Hawker	Stock Aitken Waterman; Phil Harding^{[a]}^{[b]}; Ian Curnow^{[a]}^{[b]}	4:59
8.	"I Wanna Have Some Fun" (Sample Some Fun mix)	Full Force	Full Force; Saunderson^{[a]}	7:59
9.	"Love House" (Coldest mix)	R. Bolland; F. Bolland	Rob and Ferdi Bolland; Adonis^{[a]}^{[b]}	6:28
10.	"All I Wanna Do..." (with Full Force) (FF remix)	Full Force	Full Force^{[c]}	5:30
11.	"Love House" (DJ Pierre mix)	R. Bolland; F. Bolland	Rob and Ferdi Bolland; DJ Pierre^{[a]}^{[b]}	5:52
12.	"I Wanna Have Some Fun" (Alternative Fun mix)	Full Force	Full Force; Saunderson^{[a]}	5:09
13.	"Love House" (Cool mix)	R. Bolland; F. Bolland	Rob and Ferdi Bolland; Adonis^{[a]}^{[b]}	3:42
14.	"I Only Wanna Be with You" (instrumental)	Raymonde; Hawker	Stock Aitken Waterman	2:45

Notes

- ^{^[a]} signifies a remixer
- ^{^[b]} signifies an additional producer
- ^{^[c]} signifies a main producer and remixer

== Charts ==
=== Weekly charts ===
Weekly chart performance for I Wanna Have Some Fun
Chart (1988–1989)	Peak position
Australian Albums (ARIA)	151
Canada Top Albums/CDs (RPM)	19
Finnish Albums (Suomen virallinen lista)	20
German Albums (Offizielle Top 100)	60
Japanese Albums (Oricon)	37
Swedish Albums (Sverigetopplistan)	50
Swiss Albums (Schweizer Hitparade)	28
UK Albums (Official Charts)	46
US Billboard 200	37

=== Year-end charts ===
1989 year-end chart performance for I Wanna Have Some Fun
Chart (1989)	Position
Canada Top Albums/CDs (RPM)	58
US Billboard 200	96

== Certifications ==
Certifications and sales for I Wanna Have Some Fun
Region	Certification	Certified units/sales
Canada (Music Canada)	2× Platinum	200,000^{^}
United States (RIAA)	Gold	500,000^{^}
^{^} Shipments figures based on certification alone.
