= I Surrender (To the Spirit of the Night) =

Single by Samantha Fox

from the album Samantha Fox
- B-side: "The Best Is Yet to Come"
- Released: 13 July 1987
- Studio: Battery, London
- Genre: Dance-pop; electronic rock
- Length: 3:56
- Label: Jive
- Songwriters: Jon Astrop; Karen Moline; Mark Shreeve
- Producer: Jon Astrop

Samantha Fox singles chronology
"Nothing's Gonna Stop Me Now" (1987)	"I Surrender (To the Spirit of the Night)" (1987)	"I Promise You (Get Ready)" (1987)

"I Surrender (To the Spirit of the Night)" is a song by English singer Samantha Fox from her self-titled second studio album (1987). The song was written by Jon Astrop, Karen Moline and Mark Shreeve and produced by Astrop. It was released in July 1987 as the album's second single. The single peaked at number 25 on the UK Singles Chart. Elsewhere in Europe, it became Fox's fifth consecutive top 10 single in Finland. Outside of Europe, it reached number 31 in New Zealand and number 5 in Quebec. The single was not released in the United States.

== Critical reception ==
In a review published in Smash Hits, Ro Newton stated that "I Surrender (To the Spirit of the Night)" "sounds like a huge hit" which she considered as a "loosely disguised version" of "Let's All Chant", but added that "it's been Sam Fox-ed up with thundering drums, growling guitar solos and plenty of woh-oh-ohs".

== Track listings ==
- 7-inch single

A. "I Surrender (To the Spirit of the Night)" (7″ version) – 3:00
B. "The Best Is Yet to Come" – 4:50

- 12-inch single

A. "I Surrender (To the Spirit of the Night)" (extended version) – 6:35
B1. "The Best Is Yet to Come" – 4:50
B2. "I Surrender (To the Spirit of the Night)" (7″ version) – 3:00

== Charts ==
Weekly chart performance for "I Surrender (To the Spirit of the Night)"
Chart (1987)	Peak position
Austria (Ö3 Austria Top 40)	22
Belgium (Ultratop 50 Flanders)	30
Europe (European Hot 100 Singles)	71
Finland (Suomen virallinen lista)	9
France (SNEP)	18
Ireland (IRMA)	27
Luxembourg (Radio Luxembourg)	17
Netherlands (Single Top 100)	82
New Zealand (Recorded Music NZ)	31
Quebec (ADISQ)	5
Spain (AFYVE)	4
Switzerland (Schweizer Hitparade)	10
UK Singles (OCC)	25
West Germany (GfK)	21
