= Nothing's Gonna Stop Me Now (Samantha Fox song) =

1987 single by Samantha Fox

Single by Samantha Fox

from the album Samantha Fox
- B-side: "Dream City"; "Want You to Want Me"
- Released: 18 May 1987
- Genre: Disco
- Length: 3:42
- Label: Jive
- Songwriter: Stock Aitken Waterman
- Producer: Stock Aitken Waterman

Samantha Fox singles chronology
"I'm All You Need" (1986)	"Nothing's Gonna Stop Me Now" (1987)	"I Surrender (To the Spirit of the Night)" (1987)

Music video
- "Nothing's Gonna Stop Me Now" by Samantha Fox on YouTube

"Nothing's Gonna Stop Me Now" is a song performed by British singer Samantha Fox and written and produced by Mike Stock, Matt Aitken, and Pete Waterman (Stock Aitken Waterman). It was released as the first single from Fox's second album, Samantha Fox, in May 1987. The single became Fox's third and final top-10 single in the United Kingdom, peaking at number eight on the UK Singles Chart. In the United States, the single reached number 80 on the Billboard Hot 100.

== Background and writing ==
"Nothing's Gonna Stop Me Now" was recorded after Fox's label heavily lobbied SAW to record with the singer, who the trio had previously vowed not to work with due to her topless modelling past. The producers agreed to record with Fox after being impressed with her during an initial meeting, with Stock then writing lyrics inspired by Fox's comments to him about wanting to break free of her manager father. Stock wrote most of the lyrics with Fox sitting beside him at the console, a process interrupted for a few hours when she spilt a cup of tea onto the mixing desk. Fox and her manager father insisted on the inclusion of a guitar solo, which was added – but the sound was simulated with a synthesiser. Fox never knew the guitar was simulated until 2022, expressing her shock at the revelation.

== Music video ==
The accompanying music video for the song was filmed in Marbella, Spain. Fox is shown using several forms of locomotion including a Sunseeker XPS 34 motorboat, a horse, an Alfa Romeo Spider, a Cessna Skymaster, and a BMX bike. She is also shown beside (and in) an outdoor swimming pool, wearing a "zebra-print" one-piece bathing suit with high-heeled shoes. Fox had never ridden a horse before the shoot and had only just qualified for her driver's license, having never driven a manual car before, despite the video requiring her to drive on steep mountain roads.

== Critical reception ==
In ironic review of 23 May 1987 for Number One John Aizlewood said that this song is completely similar to "other hits" of the singer and proposed to change profession to bar maid. A reviewer of American magazine Cashbox expressed a different view, assured that "this upbeat dance tune" will "generate instant dance club notoriety." Barry McIlheney of Smash Hits described "Nothing's Gonna Stop Me Now" as a "typically catchy pop/disco" song, which as a SAW production sounds similar to Mel & Kim's songs, but deemed that "the only difference though is that Mel & Kim do it a lot better".

Retrospectively, in 2021, British magazine Classic Pop ranked the song number 40 in their list of "Top 40 Stock Aitken Waterman songs", adding: "Page 3 girl Samantha Fox, the pin-up on many a pre-pubescent teen's bedroom wall, was hardly the pop sophisticate, but SAW gave her an exceptionally big hit with this inspiriting UK No.8." In 2025, Thomas Edward of Smooth Radio ranked the song tenth in his list of "Stock Aitken Waterman's 15 greatest songs, ranked" and deemed it "fierce, fist-pumping anthem about chasing your dreams".

== Chart performance ==
In Fox's home country, "Nothing's Gonna Stop Me Now" debuted at number 37 on the UK Singles Chart on 30 May 1987, reached a peak of number eight in its fourth and fifth weeks, and charted for nine weeks. In Ireland, it attained a chart peak of number five and appeared on the chart for five weeks. Elsewhere in Continental Europe, the song culminated inside the top ten in ten countries, missing it by one place in Austria only. It topped the chart in Finland, becoming her third number one hit there, and came very close to the top position in Norway where it ranked in the top ten for ten weeks, and Switzerland where it charted for 14 weeks; in both countries, it was number two for two and three weeks, respectively, being blocked from the number one slot by Whitney Houston's "I Wanna Dance with Somebody". It was also a top-three hit in Italy, peaking for three weeks out of a 16-week chart run, reached number five in Denmark and the Netherlands, number six in the Flanders region of Belgium, France and West Germany, charting for nine weeks in the top ten of the French Singles Chart, and number seven in Sweden. On the Pan-European Hot 100 Singles chart compiled by Music & Media, the single entered at number 92 on 6 June 1987, reached the top ten three weeks later, peaked at number two and charted for a total of 27 weeks. Outside Europe, "Nothing's Gonna Stop Me Now" was less successful, stalling within top 30 in Australia, Canada and New Zealand, while it was only a top-80 hit on the US Billboard Hot 100.

== Track listings ==
7-inch single

1. "Nothing's Gonna Stop Me Now" – 3:42
2. "Dream City" – 4:55

UK and European 12-inch single

1. "Nothing's Gonna Stop Me Now" (Extended Version) – 7:01
2. "Dream City" – 4:55
3. "Want You to Want Me" – 3:31

US 12-inch single

1. "Nothing's Gonna Stop Me Now" (Extended Version) – 7:01
2. "Nothing's Gonna Stop Me Now" – 3:42
3. "Nothing's Gonna Stop Me Now" (Cub Mix) – 6:58
4. "Nothing's Gonna Stop Me Now" (Instrumental) – 3:58
5. "Dream City" – 4:55

== Charts ==
=== Weekly charts ===
Weekly chart performance for "Nothing's Gonna Stop Me Now"
Chart (1987)	Peak position
Australia (Kent Music Report)	22
Austria (Ö3 Austria Top 40)	11
Belgium (Ultratop 50 Flanders)	6
Canada Top Singles (RPM)	28
Denmark (Tracklisten)	5
Europe (European Hot 100 Singles)	2
Finland (Suomen virallinen lista)	1
France (SNEP)	6
Ireland (IRMA)	5
Italy (Music & Media)	2
Italy (Musica e dischi)	3
Italy Airplay (Music & Media)	4
Luxembourg (Radio Luxembourg)	6
Netherlands (Dutch Top 40)	7
Netherlands (Single Top 100)	5
New Zealand (Recorded Music NZ)	30
Norway (VG-lista)	2
Quebec (ADISQ)	3
Spain (AFYVE)	8
Sweden (Sverigetopplistan)	7
Switzerland (Schweizer Hitparade)	2
UK Singles (Official Charts)	8
US Billboard Hot 100	80
US 12-inch Singles Sales (Billboard)	13
US Dance Club Play (Billboard)	40
US Cash Box Top 100	84
West Germany (GfK)	6

=== Year-end charts ===
Year-end chart performance for "Nothing's Gonna Stop Me Now"
Chart (1987)	Position
Belgium (Ultratop 50 Flanders)	59
Europe (European Hot 100 Singles)	10
Netherlands (Dutch Top 40)	82
Netherlands (Single Top 100)	65
Switzerland (Schweizer Hitparade)	9
West Germany (Media Control)	35

=== Anniversary charts ===
1985–1989 chart performance for "Nothing's Gonna Stop Me Now"
Chart (1985–1989)	Position
Five Years (European Hot 100 Singles)	76

== Certifications ==
Certifications for "Nothing's Gonna Stop Me Now"
Region	Certification	Certified units/sales
France (SNEP)	Silver	250,000^{*}
^{*} Sales figures based on certification alone.

== Daniela Katzenberger version ==
"Nothing's Gonna Stop Me Now"

Single by Daniela Katzenberger

from the album Natürlich blond
- Released: 20 August 2010
- Length: 3:17
- Label: EMI
- Songwriters: Mike Stock; Matt Aitken; Pete Waterman
- Producer: Blank&Jones

=== Charts ===
Weekly chart performance for "Nothing's Gonna Stop Me Now"
Chart (2010)	Peak position
Austria (Ö3 Austria Top 40)	14
Germany (GfK)	19
Switzerland (Schweizer Hitparade)	60
