= Samantha Fox =

British singer (born 1966)

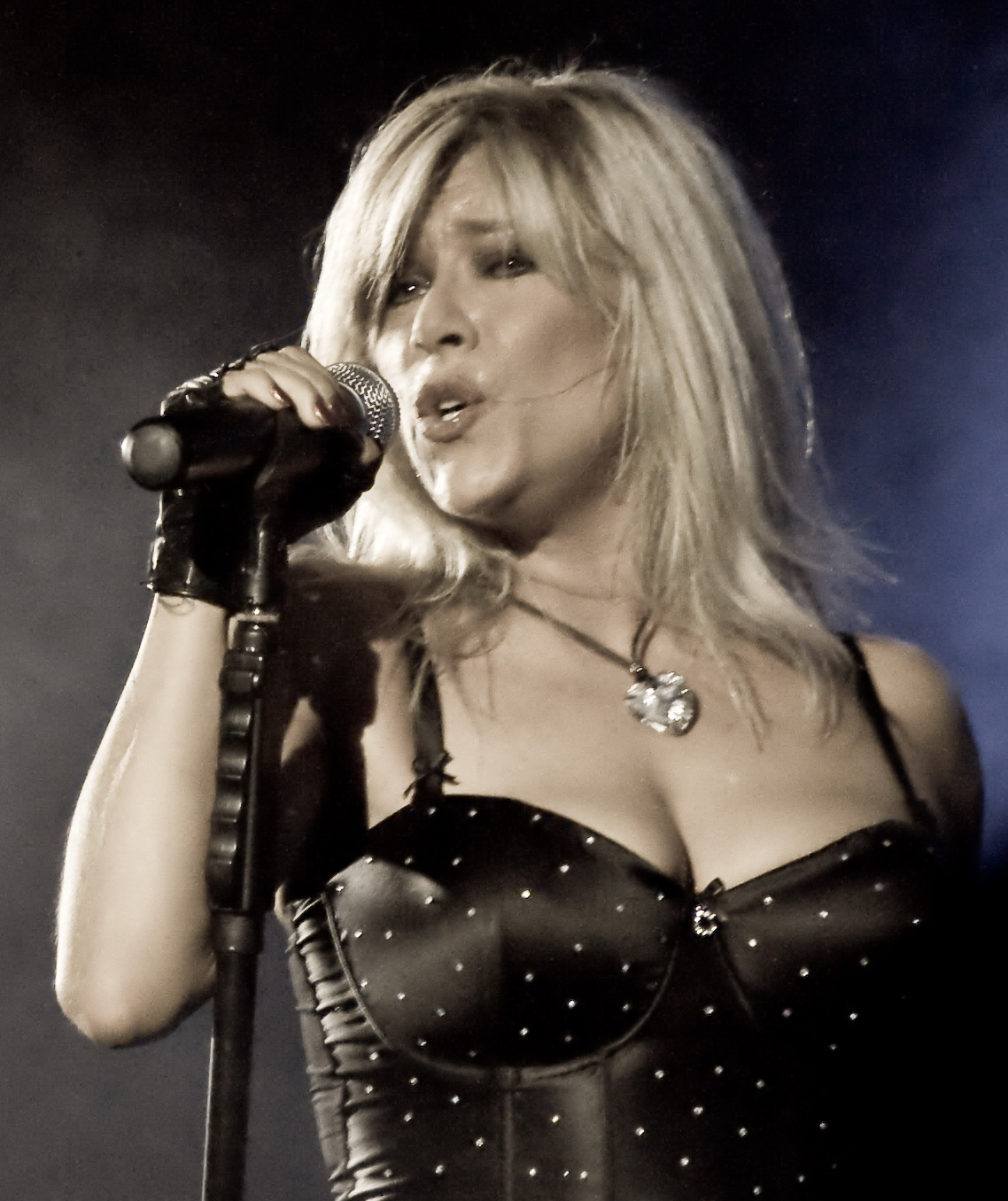
- Fox performing in 2009

Background information
- Also known as: Sam Fox
- Born: Samantha Karen Fox; 15 April 1966 (age 60); Mile End, London, England
- Genres: Dance-pop; pop; hi-NRG; Eurobeat; house
- Occupations: Singer; model; actress
- Years active: 1983–1987 (model); 1983–present (singer); 1990–present (actress)
- Labels: Jive; Sony; Lamborghini
- Spouse: Linda Birgitte Olsen (m. 2022)
- Partner: Myra Stratton (2003–2015; her death)
- Website: samfox.com

Samantha Karen Fox (born 15 April 1966) is an English pop singer and former glamour model from Wood Green in North London. She has appeared on reality television shows and has occasionally worked as a television presenter and actress.

Fox began her glamour modelling career at age 16. After she placed second in a Sunday People amateur modelling contest, The Sun recruited her to pose for Page 3, where she made her first appearance in February 1983. Named The Sun's "Page 3 Girl of the Year" for 1984, 1985 and 1986, she became one of the most photographed British women of the 1980s and a sex symbol of the era. She left Page 3 in 1986, aged 20, to focus on pop music, but made occasional glamour modelling appearances thereafter, notably featuring in a 1996 Playboy pictorial. In 2008, she was voted the top Page 3 model of all time.

Released in March 1986, Fox's debut single for the Jive Records label, "Touch Me (I Want Your Body)", became a top-10 hit across Europe, North America and Australia, reaching number one in several countries. Her first three studio albums—Touch Me (1986), Samantha Fox (1987) and I Wanna Have Some Fun (1988)—all produced international hit singles and she was nominated in the British Female Solo Artist category at the Brit Awards 1988. Her subsequent albums—Just One Night (1991), 21st Century Fox (1997) and Angel with an Attitude (2005)—were less successful, but she has continued to tour and has announced a forthcoming seventh studio album, produced by Ian Masterson.

In her early career, Fox dated men including Peter Foster, the Australian fraudster, and Paul Stanley, the rhythm guitarist and lead vocalist of rock band Kiss. Following persistent rumours in the 1990s about her sexual orientation, she came out as a lesbian in 2003. She was in a long-term relationship with her former manager Myra Stratton from 2003 until Stratton died from cancer in 2015. In 2022, she married her tour manager, Linda Birgitte Olsen.

== Early life ==
Fox was born on 15 April 1966, the eldest child of John Patrick Fox, a builder, and Carole Ann Wilken, an actress and former dancer on the 1960s pop music programme Ready, Steady, Go! She grew up in Crouch End in North London, later describing her background as "a working-class market-trader family".

Fox took an interest in the theatre from an early age, attending the Anna Scher Theatre School from age five, and subsequently attending Mountview Theatre School. She also attended St Thomas More Catholic School, Wood Green. She formed her first pop band when she was 14 and signed her first record deal with Lamborghini Records at age 15.

== Career ==
=== Modelling ===
Fox's glamour modelling career began at age 16 when her mother took photographs of her wearing lingerie and submitted them to The Sunday People's "Face and Shape of '83" amateur modelling contest. After Fox placed second, a photographer for The Sun invited her to pose topless for Page 3; at the time, she was the youngest person to model topless for the feature. At that time, the minimum age for topless modelling in the UK was 16.

Fox later said she was grateful for the opportunity, since many people in her area were unemployed or had "rough, low-paying jobs”. She had previously considered joining the police force, but at 155 centimetres (5 feet 1 inch) tall, did not meet the height requirement then in place of 163 centimetres (5 feet 4 inches) for female officers. She said she did not consider topless modelling a "big deal", as she had become comfortable with sunbathing topless on European beaches.

Fox first appeared on Page 3 of The Sun on 22 February 1983, under the headline "Sam, 16, Quits A-Levels for Ooh-Levels". She signed a four-year modelling contract with The Sun and was named its "Page 3 Girl of the Year" in 1984, 1985 and 1986. She also made modelling appearances in men's magazines. During her modelling career she insured her breasts for £1 million, inspired by Betty Grable insuring her legs for $1 million. In 1985 she appeared in a David Cassidy music video and modelled for an accompanying photoshoot, although she subsequently claimed that Cassidy had sexually assaulted her during the shoot and again in the toilets of a restaurant.

Fox left Page 3 in 1986, aged 20, to focus on her singing career. She made occasional glamour modelling appearances later in her career, including a nude photoshoot for the October 1996 issue of Playboy when she was 30. She is recognised as the most popular pin-up girl of her era as well as one of the most photographed British women of the 1980s, alongside Diana, Princess of Wales and Margaret Thatcher. In 2008 she was voted the top Page 3 girl of all time.

=== Singing ===
Fox attempted to launch a music career in 1983. Her first single, credited to S.F.X., was a cover version of the 1981 Lesley Jayne song "Rocking with My Radio", released on the Lamborghini Records label. It was produced by Ian Gillan Band and Spencer Davis Group member Ray Fenwick, who also wrote the B-side, "My Old Man". Fox continued her collaboration with Fenwick, releasing her second single, "Aim to Win", under her own name in 1984. Neither of these singles was successful. Fox later said that "[Lamborghini Records] didn't really have a clue in those days and I didn't either", but said that the experience of performing live benefited her later musical career. Songs from her early Lamborghini Records singles were included as bonus tracks on the 2012 deluxe reissue of her album Touch Me.

In 1986 Fox was invited to an open audition for Jive Records, which was seeking a "British Madonna" to record the track "Touch Me (I Want Your Body)". Released as a single in March 1986, the song became an instant hit, reaching the top 10 across Europe and topping the charts in multiple countries. In the UK, the song reached number 3 in the charts, and in the US it reached number 4 on the Billboard Hot 100. Her second single, "Do Ya Do Ya (Wanna Please Me)", also reached the top 10 in the UK. Jive Records offered her a five-album deal. Her debut album, Touch Me, peaked at number 17 in the UK and charted all over Europe, reaching number one in Finland. The album received mixed reviews from critics, but Fox dismissed the criticism, claiming that music critics routinely disapproved of attractive artists; she called female critics "plain, drab women without any sex appeal" and said that male critics "look like Elvis Costello".

Her second album, Samantha Fox, released in 1987, featured the hit singles "Nothing's Gonna Stop Me Now" (UK No. 8) and "Naughty Girls (Need Love Too)" (US No. 3). The former song was produced by Stock, Aitken and Waterman, while the latter was remixed by US production duo Full Force. At the Brit Awards 1988, Fox was nominated in the British Female Solo Artist category alongside Kate Bush, Alison Moyet, Sinitta, and Kim Wilde. The award went to Moyet. Her third album, I Wanna Have Some Fun, released later in 1988, featured the hits "I Only Wanna Be With You" (UK No. 16) and "I Wanna Have Some Fun" (US No. 8). The album also charted in both the UK and US. By the end of the decade, Fox had achieved three top-10 singles in both the UK and US and three gold albums in the latter. She continued to have notable success in Australia and Europe.

Fox's record sales declined sharply after the 1980s. She released three further studio albums, Just One Night in 1991, 21st Century Fox in 1997, and Angel with an Attitude in 2005, but none produced any hits. A Greatest Hits album was issued in 2009, both in single and double CD formats. In 2012, her first four albums were remastered and reissued as double deluxe CDs by Cherry Red, with the addition of remixes and previously unreleased tracks. In 2022, Fox announced that she was working on a seventh studio album, produced by Ian Masterson, that would include a song co-written with Steve Strange as well as songs co-written with Ricky Wilde, brother of Kim Wilde.

In addition to her solo career, Fox collaborated with Cris Bonacci (former lead guitarist for the all-female rock band Girlschool) and Lauraine McIntosh to form the short-lived band Sox. They entered A Song for Europe, the UK's pre-selection competition for the 1995 Eurovision Song Contest, coming in fourth place out of eight songs with their entry "Go for the Heart". Sox released the song as a single before disbanding. Fox collaborated on "Santa Maria" by DJ Milano, a 1997 cover version of the original 1995 song by Croatian-Dutch model and singer Tatjana. She collaborated with Swedish singer Günther, who recorded a cover version of her 1986 hit "Touch Me (I Want Your Body)" for his 2004 album Pleasureman. His version features new vocals by Fox, who also appeared in the music video. In 2022, she contributed co-lead vocals on the track "Tomorrow" with Swedish band Nestor, which was included on their album Kids in a Ghost Town. In August 2023, she toured in the United States with Bad Boys Blue and Boney M., appearing in cities including New York, Boston, Chicago, Los Angeles, and San Jose.

=== Lemmy Kilmister ===
During a hiatus in recording in the mid-1980s, following a breakdown in relations with their record label Bronze Records, Motörhead frontman Lemmy pursued informal collaborations.

They co-wrote a song titled "Beauty and the Beast" and also worked on material including a proposed cover of "Love Hurts", a song originally written for The Everly Brothers and later popularised by Nazareth.

According to Fox, the collaboration was conceived as a duet inspired by partnerships such as Dolly Parton and Kenny Rogers, and drew musical inspiration from artists including ABBA.

The material was not released due to legal issues between Motörhead and their record label at the time.

=== Film and television ===
Fox has done occasional film and television work. She and Mick Fleetwood co-presented the Brit Awards 1989, broadcast live by the BBC, although the show was subsequently described as "chaotic" and an "epic shambles". The presenters repeatedly missed their cues, including failing to show a recorded message from Michael Jackson; they also made incorrect introductions, such as introducing Boy George as the Four Tops. Fox later claimed that the cards given to presenters had incorrect information, that the autocue was malfunctioning, that female Bros fans disrupted the show with continuous screaming, and that her co-presenter Fleetwood was on drugs during the show and consequently "out of it".

In 1990, Fox appeared on the American sitcom Charles in Charge as Samantha Steele, a fictional rock star. She also featured in The Match (1999), 7 Cases (2015), and the comedy horror film Sharknado 5: Global Swarming (2017). In 1995 she guest-starred in the Hindi film Rock Dancer. In 2003, Fox participated in the reality television series The Club. In 2008, Fox and her then-partner Myra Stratton took part in Celebrity Wife Swap, exchanging with Freddie Starr and his wife Donna. In November 2009, she participated in ITV's I'm a Celebrity...Get Me Out of Here!; she was voted out on day 16. In 2010, she appeared in a celebrity episode of Come Dine with Me with Calum Best, Janice Dickinson, and Jeff Brazier. In 2016, she featured in Celebrity Big Brother 18, finishing in seventh place. In 2023, she appeared on Celebrity MasterChef. In 2026, she participated in the Antena 3 television show Mask Singer: Adivina quién canta, under the mask of Lips.

=== Charitable activity ===
In 2008, Fox donated her favourite bra to a charity auction. In 2011, she participated in a campaign for the LGBT charity the Albert Kennedy Trust.

== Personal life ==
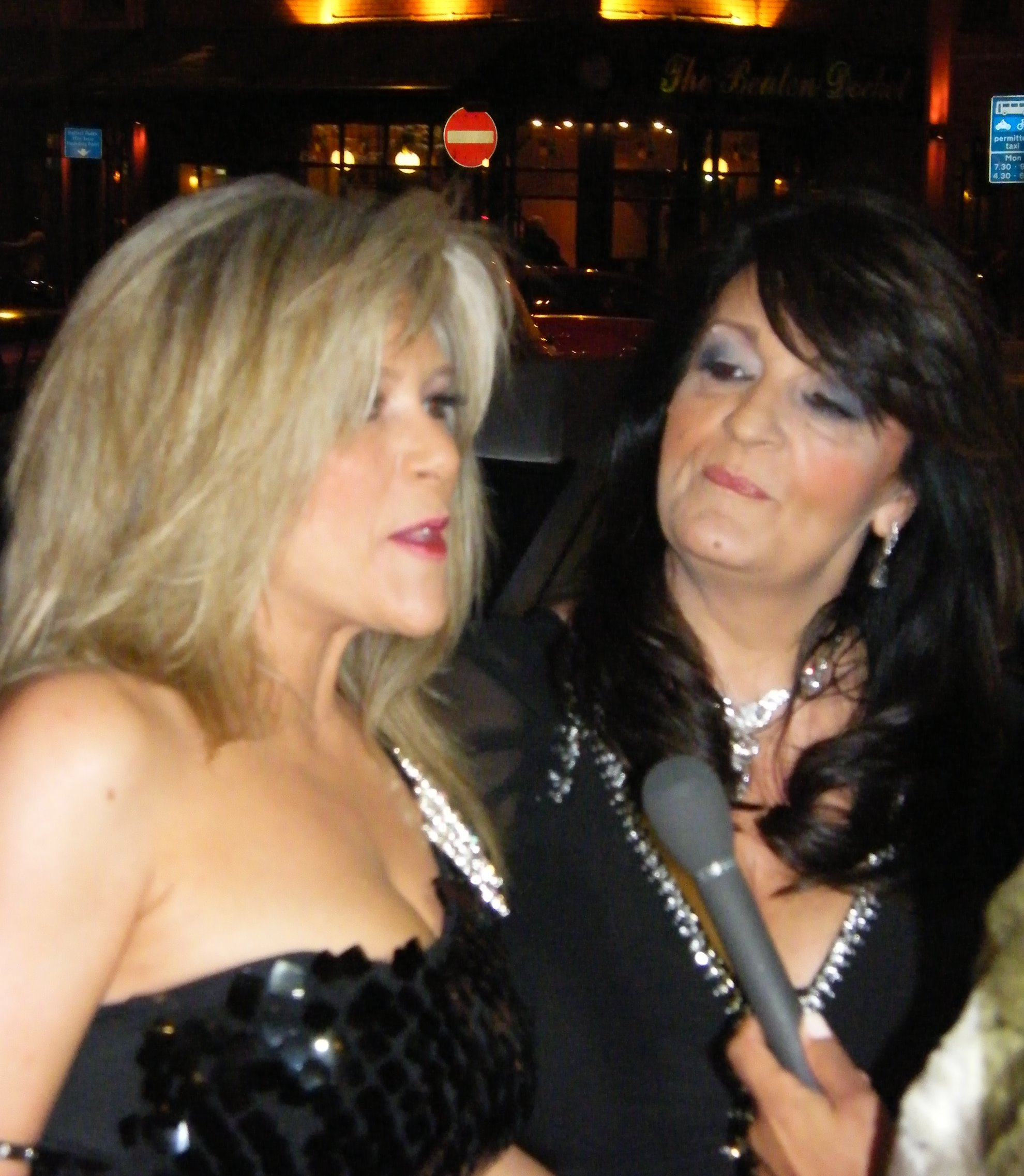
Fox (left) and her late partner Myra Stratton (right) at the 2010 Fate Awards in Belfast, Northern Ireland.

Fox's parents separated in 1988. Her father, who abused alcohol and cocaine, managed her career until 1991, when he assaulted her, leaving her with cuts, bruises, and two broken ribs. Following that incident, she hired accountants to trace more than £1 million that she believed he had embezzled from her accounts. She discovered that her father had moved her money into offshore bank accounts and had not paid tax on her earnings for a decade. She sued and was awarded a £363,000 court settlement in 1995, although those funds were used to settle her tax affairs. She spoke to her father only once during the last decade of his life; he died in 2000. Fox had one full sibling; she also has two half-siblings from her father's second marriage.

In her early career, Fox had relationships with a number of men. She dated the Australian businessman Peter Foster in the 1980s, before he was charged with fraud in 1994 for selling a bogus weight loss product and served 18 months in prison. She turned down his marriage proposal, later saying: "My parents had split and here was a man who was clever, manipulative and domineering. I came close to marrying him because I was so vulnerable." She was also linked to journalist Kit Miller; Rafi Camino, a Spanish bullfighter; and musician Paul Stanley of the American rock band Kiss. Her sexual orientation was publicly called into question in 1999, after she judged a lesbian beauty pageant. At that time, she was living with her musical collaborator Cris Bonacci, who was rumoured to be her lover. Bonacci later confirmed that she and Fox were secretly in a relationship for four and a half years.

In 2003, Fox came out as a lesbian and confirmed she was in a relationship with her then-manager Myra Stratton. Fox later said she had realised she was gay in her mid-20s but had been reluctant to come out because, having dealt with stalkers, she feared the reactions of some fans. Stratton died from cancer in 2015, aged 60. The following year, Fox began dating her Norwegian tour manager Linda Birgitte Olsen. They became engaged on Valentine's Day in 2020, after Olsen proposed, but postponed their wedding due to COVID-19 restrictions. They married on 18 June 2022 in a Eurovision-themed ceremony at King's Oak Hotel in Epping Forest, Essex.

In March 2023, Fox's younger sister Vanessa died at age 50, nine days after suffering a heart attack.

In December 2023, police officers arrested Fox at Heathrow Airport after her conduct prevented the departure of a British Airways flight. At Uxbridge Magistrates' Court in April 2024, she pleaded guilty to charges of drunk and disorderly conduct on a plane and to threatening and abusive behaviour towards a police officer. She denied assaulting her wife during the incident, and prosecutors dropped the assault charge after changes in evidence. In September 2024, she was sentenced to a 12-month community order, including a £1,000 fine and up to 25 rehabilitation activity requirement days. She was also ordered to pay £1,718.09 in compensation to British Airways, £100 to the police officer she had threatened, £85 in costs, and a £114 victim surcharge.

== Discography ==
Studio albums

- Touch Me (1986)
- Samantha Fox (1987)
- I Wanna Have Some Fun (1988)
- Just One Night (1991)
- 21st Century Fox (1997)
- Angel with an Attitude (2005)

== Awards and recognition ==
Name of organisation, nomine work/honour, year(s) listed
Awards	Works	Year(s)	Result	Ref.
8th Brit Awards	Best Female Solo Artist	1988	Nominated	
Diamond Awards Festival	Sales Achievement	1987	Won	
Music Week Europarade Year End Charts	Nº 1 Single "Touch Me" (I Want Your Body)	1986	Won	
Music & Media "Pan European Awards"	Herself	1987	Won	
European Hot 100 Singles – Hot 100 of the Year	"Touch Me (I Want Your Body)"	1986	3rd place	
European Hot 100 Albums – Hot 100 of the Year	Touch Me	1986	89th place	
"Euroclips" Europe's Top 50 Video Clips 1987	"Nothing's Gonna Stop Me Now"	1987	Tie	
European Hot 100 Singles – Hot 100 of the Year	"Nothing's Gonna Stop Me Now"	1987	10th place	
European Hot 100 Albums – Hot 100 of the Year	Touch Me	1987	67th place	

== Certifications ==
Awards	Works	Year(s)	Format	Result
Gold	The Music Video Collection	1990	Video Longform	Certified
Gold	I Wanna Have Some Fun	1989	Album	Certified
Gold	"I Wanna Have Some Fun"	1989	Single	Certified
Gold	Samantha Fox	1988	Album	Certified
Gold	Touch Me	1987	Album	Certified
