= Gold (disambiguation) =

Gold is a chemical element with symbol Au and atomic number 79.

Gold may also refer to:

== Arts, entertainment, and media ==
=== Fictional characters ===
- Gold, a member of the Metal Men in the DC Comics universe
- Gold (Pokémon), the protagonist of the games Pokémon Gold, Silver, and Crystal

=== Films ===
- Gold (1932 film), an American film directed by Otto Brower
- Gold (1934 film), a German film directed by Karl Hartl
- Gold (1955 film), a Canadian short documentary directed by Colin Low
- Gold (1974 film), starring Roger Moore
- Gold (2013 film), a German film directed by Thomas Arslan
- Gold (2014 film), an Irish comedy
- Gold (2016 film), an American crime drama
- Gold (2017 film), a Spanish historical drama
- Gold (2018 film), an Indian historical sports drama
- Gold (2022 Australian film), a survival thriller directed by Anthony Hayes
- Gold (2022 Indian film), an Indian Malayalam-language comedy drama
- Gold (2024 film), a Malaysia sports docudrama based on Cheah Liek Hou

=== Literature ===
- Gold (Asimov), a 1995 collection of short stories by Isaac Asimov
- Gold (Cleave novel), 2012, by Chris Cleave
- Gold (Rhodes novel), 2007, by Dan Rhodes
- "Gold" (short story), a 1991 science fiction story by Isaac Asimov

=== Music ===
==== Albums ====
- Gold (Barbara Dickson album), a 1985 album
- Gold (Britt Nicole album), a 2012 album
- Gold (Crystal Lewis album), a 1998 album
- Gold (Garnett Silk album), a 2000 album
- Gold (Jasmine album), a 2010 album
- Gold (Marika Gombitová album), a 2005 Slovak album
- Gold (Modus album), a 2005 album
- Gold (Ohio Players album), a 1976 soul/funk album
- Gold (Ricky Dillon album), an album
- Gold (Ryan Adams album), a 2001 album
- Gold (Sister Sparrow album), a 2018 album
- Gold (Starflyer 59 album), a 1995 album
- The Gold Record, a 2006 album by The Bouncing Souls
- Gold (compilation album), several albums with this title
- Gold, a 2004 album by The Fucking Am
- Gold, a 2025 album by Scour
- Weezer, a 2026 album by Weezer colloquially referred to as The Gold Album

==== Extended plays ====
- Gold (Itzy EP), 2024
- Gold (Jessie James Decker EP), 2017
- Gold (Metro Station EP), 2014
- Gold (Sir Sly EP), 2013
- Gold Gold Gold, an EP by Foals

==== Songs ====
- "Gold" (Amanda Lear song), 1978
- "Gold" (B'z song), 2001
- "Gold" (Beverley Knight song), 2002
- "Gold" (Britt Nicole song), 2012
- "Gold" (Brockhampton song), 2017
- "Gold" (Chet Faker song), 2014
- "Gold" (Dierks Bentley song), 2022
- "Gold" (Imagine Dragons song), 2015
- "Gold" (John Stewart song), 1979
- "Gold" (Kiiara song), 2015
- "Gold" (Loi song), 2022
- "Gold" (Neon Hitch song), 2012
- "Gold" (Prince song), 1995
- "Gold" (Sandhja song), 2014
- "Gold" (Spandau Ballet song), 1983
- "Gold" (Uverworld song), 2010
- "Gold" (Victoria Justice song), 2013
- "The Gold" (song), by Manchester Orchestra from A Black Mile to the Surface, 2017
- "Gold", by Antoine Clamaran, 2009
- "Gold", by Britt Nicole from Gold, 2012
- "Gold", by Craig David from 22, 2022
- "Gold", by East 17 from Walthamstow, 1992
- "Gold", by Eden from Vertigo, 2017
- "Gold", by Gabriel Ríos, 2014
- "Gold", by James Marriott, 2021
- "Gold", by Macklemore & Ryan Lewis from The Heist, 2012
- "Gold", by Marina and the Diamonds from Froot, 2015
- "Gold", by Owl City from Shooting Star and The Midsummer Station, 2012
- "Gold", by Sigur Rós from Átta, 2023
- "Gold", by Sir Sly from Gold, 2013
- "Gold", by Sleeping with Sirens from Madness, 2015
- "Gold", by The Sugarcubes from Stick Around for Joy, 1992
- "Gold", by Trixie Mattel from Barbara, 2020
- "Gold", by XTC from Mummer, 1983
- "Gold", by Hikaru Utada, 2023
- "Gold", by 2hollis, 2024

==== Other uses in music ====
- Gold (band), a French band
- Gggolddd, a Dutch band formerly known as GOLD
- Gold album, an album or single that has sold a minimum number of copies
- Gold CD, a compact disc made of gold instead of aluminium

=== Radio ===
- Gold (Australian radio network)
- Gold (British radio network), created in 2007
- Gold (New Zealand radio network)
- Gold 905, a Singaporean radio station

=== Television ===
- Gold (Australian TV channel), a regional Australian television channel
- U&Gold, a British television channel (formerly UK Gold)
- ANT1 Gold, a spin-off satellite channel from Antenna Group
- Sat.1 Gold, a German television channel
- TV3 Gold, an Estonian television channel
- The Gold (TV series), a British drama television series

=== Games ===
- Pokémon Gold, a 1999 role-playing video game
- WarioWare Gold, a 2018 minigame compilation video game

== Brands and enterprises ==
- Gold (biscuit), a caramel covered biscuit made by McVities
- Stagecoach Gold, a luxury bus brand in the UK

== Places ==
- Gold (crater), impact crater on Mars
- Fine Gold, California, a community in Madera County, formerly known as Gold
- Gold Beach, the code name for one of the D-Day landing beaches that Allied forces used to invade German-occupied France during World War II

== Science and technology ==
- Gold (color), shade of the metal gold
- Gold (linker), designed to be faster than GNU ld
- Going gold, in a software-release life-cycle, when a piece of software becomes ready for mass distribution
- Gold open access, a framework for publishing and distributing open-access scholarly research
- Isotopes of gold

== Other uses ==
- Gold (hieroglyph), an Egyptian language hieroglyph
- Gold (surname)
- Golds (ethnic group), an old name for the Nanai people
- Gold language, the Nanai language
- Haryana Gold, an Indian professional basketball team
- Ornaments of Gold, or az-Zukhruf, the 43rd sura of the Qur'an
- Metal (wuxing), an element in Chinese philosophy
- Edible gold, a form of gold that is edible
- Zimbabwe Gold, the currency of Zimbabwe

== See also ==
- Au (disambiguation)
- Black and Gold (disambiguation)
- Black Gold (disambiguation)
- Blue and Gold (disambiguation)
- Blue Gold (disambiguation)
- Fool's Gold (disambiguation)
- GOLD (disambiguation)
- Gold Award (disambiguation)
- Golden (disambiguation)
- Gold digger (disambiguation)
- Gold Dust (disambiguation)
- Goldfinger (film), 1964 spy film
- Gold medal (disambiguation)
- Goldmine (disambiguation)
- Gold River (disambiguation)
- Gold Star (disambiguation)
- Red Gold (disambiguation)
- The Goldfinger, 2023 Hong Kong crime drama film
- White Gold (disambiguation)
