= Black gold =

Black gold or Black Gold may refer to:

== Commodities ==
- Petroleum or crude oil
- Black pepper
- Colored gold § Black gold
- Compost

== Arts and entertainment ==
=== Film and television ===
- Black Gold (1928 film), an American film produced by Norman Studios
- Black Gold (1936 film), an American film starring Frankie Darro
- Black Gold (1942 film), an Italian film directed by Enrico Guazzoni
- Black Gold (1947 film), an American film
- Black Gold (1962 film), an American adventure film
- Kaala Sona (lit. 'Black Gold'), a 1975 Indian Hindi-language action thriller film
- Gentle Ben 2: Black Gold, a 2003 remake of Gentle Ben
- Black Gold (2006 film), a documentary about the fair-trading of coffee beans
- Black Gold (2011 Nigerian film), a drama
- Black Gold (2011 Qatari film), a war film co-produced with France, Tunisia and Italy
- Black Gold (2026 film), a Tamil-language action drama
- Black Gold (American TV series), a documentary about oil-drilling in West Texas
- Black Gold (South African TV series), 2025 telenovela

=== Music ===
- Black Gold (band), an indie-rock band from Brooklyn, New York
- Black Gold (Jimi Hendrix recordings), an unreleased Jimi Hendrix album
- Black Gold (Nina Simone album), 1970
- Black Gold (Kutt Calhoun album), 2013
- Black Gold: The Best of Soul Asylum
- Black Gold: Best of Editors
- "Black Gold" (song), a 1993 song by Soul Asylum from Grave Dancer's Union
- "Black Gold", a 1997 song by Millencolin from For Monkeys
- "Black Gold", a 2005 song by Running Wild from Rogues en Vogue
- "Black Gold", a 2006 single by The Prom Kings
- "Black Gold", a 2008 song by Norther from N
- "Black Gold", a 2009 song by John Robinson from Unexpected Guests
- "Black Gold", a 2010 song by Foals from Total Life Forever
- "Black Gold", a 2012 song by Esperanza Spalding from Radio Music Society

=== Video games ===
- Black Gold (video game), a video game of the strategy genre released in 1989 by reLINE Software
- World War III: Black Gold, a 2001 strategy game made by JoWood and Reality Pump
- Black Gold Online, a 2014 steampunk MMORPG Published by Snail Games

=== Other media ===
- Asterix and the Black Gold, the twenty-sixth volume of the Asterix comic book series
- Land of Black Gold, the fifteenth of The Adventures of Tintin
- Black Gold (novel), a 1987 novel about South Africa by Anthony Sampson
- Black Gold, a 2001 art installation by Nathaniel Mellors
- Black Gold Awards, a televised awards ceremony for Black music from the 1980s

== Other uses ==
- Black Gold, Kentucky
- Black Gold (horse) (1921–1928), winner of 1924's Kentucky Derby
- Black gold (politics), a term used in Taiwan to refer to political corruption
- Ouro Preto, city and former gold rush town in Minas Gerais, Brazil whose name means "Black Gold"
- Black Gold Casino, Chickasaw Nation casino in Oklahoma

== See also ==
- Black and Gold (disambiguation)
- Gold (disambiguation)
