= Gold Digger =

A gold digger is someone who engages in romantic relationships for money rather than love.

Gold Digger, Gold Diggers or The Gold Diggers may refer to:

== Film and television ==
- The Gold Diggers (1923 film), a Warner Bros. silent film
- Gold Diggers of Broadway (1929 film), which is now partially lost
- Gold Diggers of 1933, (1933 film), American pre-Code musical film directed by Mervyn LeRoy
- Gold Diggers of 1935, (1935 film), American Warner Bros. musical film directed and choreographed by Busby Berkeley
- Gold Diggers of 1937, (1936 film), Warner Bros. musical film directed by Lloyd Bacon
- Gold Diggers in Paris (1938 film), Warner Bros. musical film directed by Ray Enright
- The Gold Diggers (1983 film), a British film by Sally Potter
- Gold Diggers: The Secret of Bear Mountain, a 1995 film
- Golddigger (film), a 1914 Hungarian film
- National Lampoon's Gold Diggers, a 2003 film
- Gold Digger (TV series), a 2019 British drama miniseries
- Gold Diggers (TV series), a 2019 Russian drama series
- Gold Diggers (Australian TV series), a 2023 comedy series

== Literature ==
- The Gold Diggers (Aleichem play), a 1908 Yiddish theatre play
- The Gold Diggers (1919 play), a play by Avery Hopwood
- Gold Digger (comics), a comic book series by Fred Perry
- The Gold Diggers, a 1954 book of poetry by Robert Creeley
- Gold Diggers, a 2021 novel by Sanjena Sathian

== Music ==
- The Golddiggers, an all-girl singing and dancing troupe that appeared on The Dean Martin Show
- "Gold Digger" (EPMD song) (1990)
- "Gold Digger" (Dolly Rockers song) (2009)
- "Gold Digger" (Kanye West song) (2005)
- "Golddiggers", a 2004 song by Günther from Pleasureman
- "Gold Digger", a 2004 song by Ludacris from the film Shark Tale
- "Golddigger", a 2005 song by Armin van Buuren from Shivers

== Other uses ==
- Gold Digger (horse) (1962–1990), an American Thoroughbred racehorse
- Søllerød Gold Diggers, an American football team from Rudersdal, Denmark

== See also ==
Warner Bros. musicals:

- Gold Diggers of Broadway (1929)
- Gold Diggers of 1933
- Gold Diggers of 1935
- Gold Diggers of 1937
- Gold Diggers in Paris (1938)
