= Hold On Tight (Samantha Fox song) =

Single by Samantha Fox

from the album Touch Me
- B-side: "It's Only Love"
- Released: 1986
- Genre: Rock and roll; rockabilly
- Length: 3:34
- Label: Jive
- Songwriter: John David
- Producers: John David; Steve Power

Samantha Fox singles chronology
| "Do Ya Do Ya (Wanna Please Me)" (1986) | "Hold On Tight" (1986) | "I'm All You Need" (1986) |

Music video
- "Hold On Tight" on YouTube

"Hold On Tight" is the third single from English pop singer Samantha Fox's debut studio album Touch Me (1986). It became her third consecutive top 10 hit in Finland, peaking at number 7.

== Song information ==
The music video for Hold On Tight reflects the song's rockabilly sensibilities with Fox in a 1950s-style diner sporting a ponytail, midriff-baring shirt, denim hot pants, and cowboy boots. Soon after putting her song on the diner's jukebox she goes outside, now wearing a fringe trimmed red leather dress. As she sings "Hold On Tight", Fox dances with greasers and youths in letterman jackets and poodle skirts, typical of 1950s fashion.

== Critical reception ==
Lucy O'Brien in a review of 30 August 1986 for New Musical Express gave a negative view of the song and video by saying that Samantha Fox was "aping Suzi Quatro with derivative R&R crap". She concluded: "It's not even worth a laugh on Wogan". William Shaw of Smash Hits expressed similar opinion. He called a voice of the singer "unpleasantly squeaky", the song itself he described as "attempt to try a spot of rock'n'roll" that became "absolute disgrace" and finalized single review by deride of Fox look as a "Bonnie Tyler motorcycle vixen" on picture sleeve. Pat Thomas of Number One magazine gave the single a negative review, describing it as a "standard country rockin' affair" that "falls a little flat" compared to Fox's previous work. Thomas concluded that "whatever attributes Ms Fox might possess, a singing voice isn't one of them."

== Track listings ==
Vinyl, 7" UK (FOXY 3)

1. "Hold On Tight" – 3:34
2. "It's Only Love" – 3:36

Vinyl, 12", Picture Disc UK (FOXY S 3)

1. "Hold On Tight (Extended Version)" – 5:06
2. "Hold On Tight (Instrumental Version)" – 3:36
3. "Touch Me (I Want Your Body) (Blue Mix)" – 5:49
4. "It's Only Love" – 3:34

== Charts ==
| Chart (1986) | Peak position |
|---|---|
| Australia (Kent Music Report) | 81 |
| Belgium (Ultratop 50 Flanders) | 24 |
| Europe (European Hot 100 Singles) | 44 |
| Finland (Suomen virallinen lista) | 7 |
| Ireland (IRMA) | 13 |
| Luxembourg (Radio Luxembourg) | 17 |
| Switzerland (Schweizer Hitparade) | 24 |
| UK Singles (Official Charts) | 26 |
| West Germany (GfK) | 31 |
