= Do Ouro River =

Do Ouro River or Rio do Ouro may refer to:

== Brazil ==
- Ouro River (Acre)
- Do Ouro River (Bahia)
- Do Ouro River (Goiás)
- Do Ouro River (Rio Grande do Sul)
- Do Ouro River (Santa Catarina)
- Do Ouro River (Rondônia)

== Other places ==
- Rio do Ouro, a river in São Tomé and Príncipe

== See also ==
- Ouro Preto River, Brazil
- Gold River (disambiguation)
- Golden River (disambiguation)
