= Blue and Gold =

Blue and Gold may refer to:

- Blue & Gold, the school newspaper of Taipei American School
- "Navy Blue and Gold", the alma mater of the United States Naval Academy
- Nocturne: Blue and Gold – Old Battersea Bridge, an 1870s painting
- An Annapolis Story, alternatively known as The Blue and Gold, a 1955 American war/drama film
- Winnipeg Blue Bombers, a football team in the Canadian Football League

== See also ==
- "The Blue and the Gold March", the official fight song of the University of Negros Occidental-Recoletos
- Blue & Gold Fleet an American ferry company
- Blue Gold (disambiguation)
- The dress, a viral internet phenomenon over whether a dress was black and blue or white and gold.
