= The Imogen Styles =

English electropop band

- Origin: Manchester, England
- Genres: Electropop, synthpop, wonky pop
- Years active: 2005–present
- Members: Christopher Dresden Styles (vocals/songwriting); Syma (vocals/eroticism)
- Website: www.theimogenstyles.com

The Imogen Styles are an English electropop band consisting of Christopher Dresden Styles and Syma. The band cite Pet Shop Boys, The Human League, Soft Cell and Black Box Recorder as musical influences.

The band was formed in 2005, when Christopher Dresden Styles was offered the chance to play a gig at an unsigned band night at Retro Bar in Manchester on Monday 11 July. At the time, The Imogen Styles consisted solely of Christopher as frontman, along with a music stand, which was used to display the title of the song he was singing at the time. All the music was supplied as a backing track from an iPod. After the success of this first gig, other gig offers followed.

As an added incentive for people to turn up for The Imogen Styles' early gigs, Christopher often arranged for badges to be given out to attendees. The badges were often labelled with the gig number as a souvenir for those who turned up.

In March 2008, Syma joined the band as an additional vocalist.

The band launched a new website in January 2012 which showcases new tracks and accompanying music videos.

To mark Kylie Minogue's K25 celebrations, commemorating her twenty five years in the music business, the band covered the classic Kylie Minogue and Jason Donovan duet, "Especially for You".
