= Touch Me (Samantha Fox album) =

1986 studio album by Samantha Fox

Studio album by Samantha Fox
- Released: 7 July 1986
- Recorded: 1985
- Studios: Battery (London), Zomba Productions Ltd.
- Genre: Dance-pop
- Length: 37:45
- Label: Jive
- Producers: Jon Astrop; John David; Pete Q. Harris; Steve Lovell; Phil Nicholas; Steve Power; Richard Jon Smith

Samantha Fox chronology
Touch Me (1986)	Samantha Fox (1987)

Singles from Touch Me
- 1. "Touch Me (I Want Your Body)" Released: 10 March 1986; 2. "Do Ya Do Ya (Wanna Please Me)" Released: 1986; 3. "Hold On Tight" Released: 1986; 4. "I'm All You Need" Released: 1986

Touch Me is the debut studio album by the English pop singer Samantha Fox, released on 7 July 1986 by Jive Records. A successful topless model, Fox won a five-album recording contract with Jive after being invited to an open cattle call by the label, who were seeking "a British Madonna" to front the track "Touch Me (I Want Your Body)".

That single reached number three on the UK Singles Chart and number four on the US Billboard Hot 100. Following that success, the album was recorded quickly, with Fox spending a month recording "day and night" to meet deadlines.

Fox pushed for a hard rock edge to the record, in accordance with her personal taste at the time. The album spawned three more commercially successful singles:, "Do Ya Do Ya (Wanna Please Me)", "Hold On Tight" and "I'm All You Need".

The album has been certified silver by the British Phonographic Industry (BPI) and gold by the Recording Industry Association of America (RIAA). Derek Ridgers was credited for the cover photography.

On 25 July 2012, Cherry Red Records released a special two-disc deluxe reissue of Touch Me. Compiled with personal input from Fox, the set includes an extensive booklet, reversible cover art, newly added photos, a fully illustrated discography and recording data, full lyrics and new sleeve notes written especially for the release.

== Critical reception ==
Professional ratings
Review scores
Source	Rating
AllMusic	4/5 stars
Kerrang!	2.25/5
Smash Hits	5/10
Sounds	3/5 stars

From contemporary reviews, Sylvie Simmons of Kerrang! declared the album to be "a bit of a mix" noting "different styles, different producers, 99% of both embarrassing" concluding that "there certainly isn't much passion on this album—better than I expected, if worse than I hoped."

== Track listing ==
=== European and Australian edition ===
Side one
No.	Title	Writer(s)	Producer(s)	Length
1.	"Touch Me (I Want Your Body)"	Mark Shreeve; Jon Astrop; Pete Q. Harris	Astrop; Harris	3:44
2.	"I'm All You Need"	Astrop; Karen Moline	Astrop	4:25
3.	"Suzie, Don't Leave Me with Your Boyfriend"	Astrop	Astrop	3:54
4.	"Wild Kinda Love"	Shreeve; Oscar Van Geldern	Astrop; Harris	3:33
5.	"Hold On Tight"	John David	David; Steve Power	3:36

Side two
No.	Title	Writer(s)	Producer(s)	Length
6.	"Do Ya Do Ya (Wanna Please Me)"	Mike Bissell; Graham Richardson	Steve Lovell; Power	3:48
7.	"Baby I'm Lost for Words"	Edwin Howell	Phil Nicholas	3:48
8.	"It's Only Love"	Michael J. Mullins; Maurice Ruiz	Richard Jon Smith	3:20
9.	"He's Got Sex"	Sean McLusky; Dig Wayne	Nicholas	3:50
10.	"Drop Me a Line"	M.c Charles Dickins & DJ Mullins	Nicholas	3:47
Total length:				37:45

2012 Deluxe Edition, Disc One (Bonus Tracks)

No.	Title	Writer(s)	Producer(s)	Length
11.	"Tonight's the Night"	Steve Warley	Nicholas	3:20
12.	"Want You to Want Me"	Steve Lambert; Steve Byrd	Lovell; Power	3:30
13.	"Rockin' in the City"	Brian Bonhomme; Rod Nash; Jon Durno	Lovell	3:30
14.	"Never Gonna Fall in Love Again"	Mullins	Nicholas	5:08
15.	"Rockin' with My Radio"	Felix Landau; Henri Pauchard; Lesley Blanc	Mike Hurst; Ray Fenwick	3:22
16.	"Aim to Win"	Bruce Woolley; Simon Darlow; Thereza Bazar	Hurst; Fenwick	3:15
17.	"Holding"	Hurst	Fenwick	3:00
18.	"Touch Me (I Want Your Body)" (alternative version)	Shreeve; Astrop; Harris	Astrop; Harris; Jerry Peal^{[a]}	4:11
19.	"Hold On Tight" (radio mix)	David	David; Power; Bryan "Chuck" New^{[a]}	3:40
20.	"I'm All You Need" (single re-mix)	Astrop; Moline	Astrop	4:00

2012 Deluxe Edition, Disc Two (Bonus Tracks)
No.	Title	Writer(s)	Producer(s)	Length
1.	"Touch Me (I Want Your Body)" (extended version)	Shreeve; Astrop; Harris	Astrop; Harris	5:23
2.	"Do Ya Do Ya (Wanna Please Me)" (extended version)	Bissell; Richardson	Lovell; Power	5:17
3.	"Hold On Tight" (extended version)	David	David; Power	5:07
4.	"I'm All You Need" (extended version)	Astrop; Moline	Astrop	5:20
5.	"Suzie, Don't Leave Me with Your Boyfriend" (single re-mix)	Astrop	Astrop	3:24
6.	"Wild Kinda Love" (remix)	Shreeve; Van Geldern	Harris; Astrop	3:40
7.	"Touch Me (I Want Your Body)" (Blue mix)	Shreeve; Astrop; Harris	Astrop; Harris; Peal^{[a]}	5:51
8.	"Do Ya Do Ya (Wanna Please Me)" (Vixen mix)	Bissell; Richardson	Lovell; Power; Peal^{[a]}	6:14
9.	"Rockin' with My Radio" (extended version)	Landau; Pauchard; Blanc	Hurst; Fenwick	5:16
10.	"Aim to Win" (extended version)	Woolley; Darlow; Bazar	Hurst; Fenwick	5:26
11.	"Holding" (extended version)	Hurst	Fenwick	5:15
12.	"Suzie, Don't Leave Me with Your Boyfriend" (extended version)	Astrop	Astrop	4:48
13.	"Touch Me (I Want Your Body)" (instrumental)	Shreeve; Astrop; Harris	Astrop; Harris	3:44
14.	"Do Ya Do Ya (Wanna Please Me)" (instrumental)	Bissell; Richardson	Lovell; Power	3:49
15.	"Hold On Tight" (instrumental)	David	David; Power; New^{[a]}	3:39
16.	"I'm All You Need" (instrumental)	Astrop; Moline	Astrop	4:00
17.	"Holding" (dub mix)	Hurst	Fenwick	2:47

=== US, Canadian and Japanese edition ===
Side one
No.	Title	Writer(s)	Producer(s)	Length
1.	"Touch Me (I Want Your Body)"	Shreeve; Astrop; Harris	Astrop; Harris	3:44
2.	"I'm All You Need"	Astrop; Moline	Astrop	4:25
3.	"Suzie, Don't Leave Me with Your Boyfriend"	Astrop	Astrop	3:54
4.	"Wild Kinda Love"	Shreeve; Van Geldern	Harris; Astrop	3:33
5.	"Hold On Tight"	David	David; Power	3:36

Side two
No.	Title	Writer(s)	Producer(s)	Length
6.	"Do Ya Do Ya (Wanna Please Me)"	Bissell; Richardson	Lovell; Power	3:48
7.	"Want You to Want Me"	Lambert; Byrd	Lovell; Power	3:30
8.	"Baby I'm Lost for Words"	Howell	Nicholas	3:48
9.	"Rockin' in the City"	Bonhomme; Nash; Durno	Lovell	3:29
10.	"He's Got Sex"	McLusky; Wayne	Nicholas	3:50

2009 CD Reissue (Bonus Tracks)

No.	Title	Writer(s)	Producer(s)	Length
11.	"It's Only Love"	Mullins; Ruiz	Smith	3:20
12.	"Drop Me a Line"	Mullins	Nicholas	3:47
13.	"Tonight's the Night"	Steve Warley	Nicholas	3:20
14.	"Never Gonna Fall in Love Again"	Mullins	Nicholas	5:08
15.	"Touch Me (I Want Your Body)" (Blue mix)	Shreeve; Astrop; Harris	Astrop; Harris; Peal^{[a]}	5:41
16.	"Hold On Tight" (extended version)	David	David; Power	5:03
17.	"Do Ya Do Ya (Wanna Please Me)" (extended version)	Bissell; Richardson	Lovell; Power	5:07
18.	"Fox Hunt Mix: I Surrender (To the Spirit of the Night)/Touch Me (I Want Your Body)"	Astrop; Moline; Shreeve; Harris	Astrop; Harris	5:56

=== Special edition ===
Released on vinyl and cassette in select European countries (United Kingdom, Germany, Greece and Scandinavia) in 1986.

Side one
No.	Title	Writer(s)	Producer(s)	Length
1.	"Touch Me (I Want Your Body)" (Blue mix)	Shreeve; Astrop; Harris	Astrop; Harris; Peal^{[a]}	5:49
2.	"I'm All You Need" (single re-mix)	Astrop; Moline	Astrop	4:00
3.	"Hold On Tight" (radio mix)	David	David; Power	3:40
4.	"Suzie, Don't Leave Me with Your Boyfriend" (U.K. album mix)	Astrop	Astrop	3:54
5.	"Wild Kinda Love" (remix)	Shreeve; Van Geldern	Harris; Astrop	3:29
6.	"Tonight's the Night"	Warley	Nicholas	3:16

Side two
No.	Title	Writer(s)	Producer(s)	Length
7.	"Do Ya Do Ya (Wanna Please Me)" (Vixen mix)	Bissell; Richardson	Lovell; Power; Peal^{[a]}	6:13
8.	"Want You to Want Me" (U.S. album mix)	Lambert; Byrd	Lovell; Power	3:29
9.	"Baby I'm Lost for Words" (U.S. album mix)	Howell	Nicholas	3:48
10.	"He's Got Sex" (U.K. album mix)	McLusky; Wayne	Nicholas	3:50

Notes

- ^{^[a]} signifies a remixer

== Charts ==
=== Weekly charts ===
Weekly chart performance for Touch Me
Chart (1986–1987)	Peak position
Australian Albums (Kent Music Report)	20
Austrian Albums (Ö3 Austria)	12
Canada Top Albums/CDs (RPM)	7
Dutch Albums (Album Top 100)	67
European Albums (Music & Media)	20
Finnish Albums (Suomen virallinen lista)	1
German Albums (Offizielle Top 100)	9
New Zealand Albums (RMNZ)	46
Norwegian Albums (VG-lista)	3
Swedish Albums (Sverigetopplistan)	5
Swiss Albums (Schweizer Hitparade)	4
UK Albums (Official Charts)	17
US Billboard 200	24

=== Year-end charts ===
1986 year-end chart performance for Touch Me
Chart (1986)	Position
European Albums (Music & Media)	89
German Albums (Offizielle Top 100)	58
Swiss Albums (Schweizer Hitparade)	24

1987 year-end chart performance for Touch Me
Chart (1987)	Position
Canada Top Albums/CDs (RPM)	45
European Albums (Music & Media)	62

== Certifications ==
Certifications for Touch Me
Region	Certification	Certified units/sales
Canada (Music Canada)	2× Platinum	200,000^{^}
Denmark (IFPI Danmark)	Silver	25,000
Finland (Musiikkituottajat)	Platinum	55,870
Norway (IFPI Norway)	Gold	25,000^{*}
Sweden (GLF)	Platinum	100,000^{^}
Switzerland (IFPI Switzerland)	Platinum	50,000^{^}
United Kingdom (BPI)	Silver	60,000^{^}
United States (RIAA)	Gold	500,000^{^}
^{*} Sales figures based on certification alone.^{^} Shipments figures based on certification alone.
