= Dolly Rockers =

English girl group

The Dolly Rockers
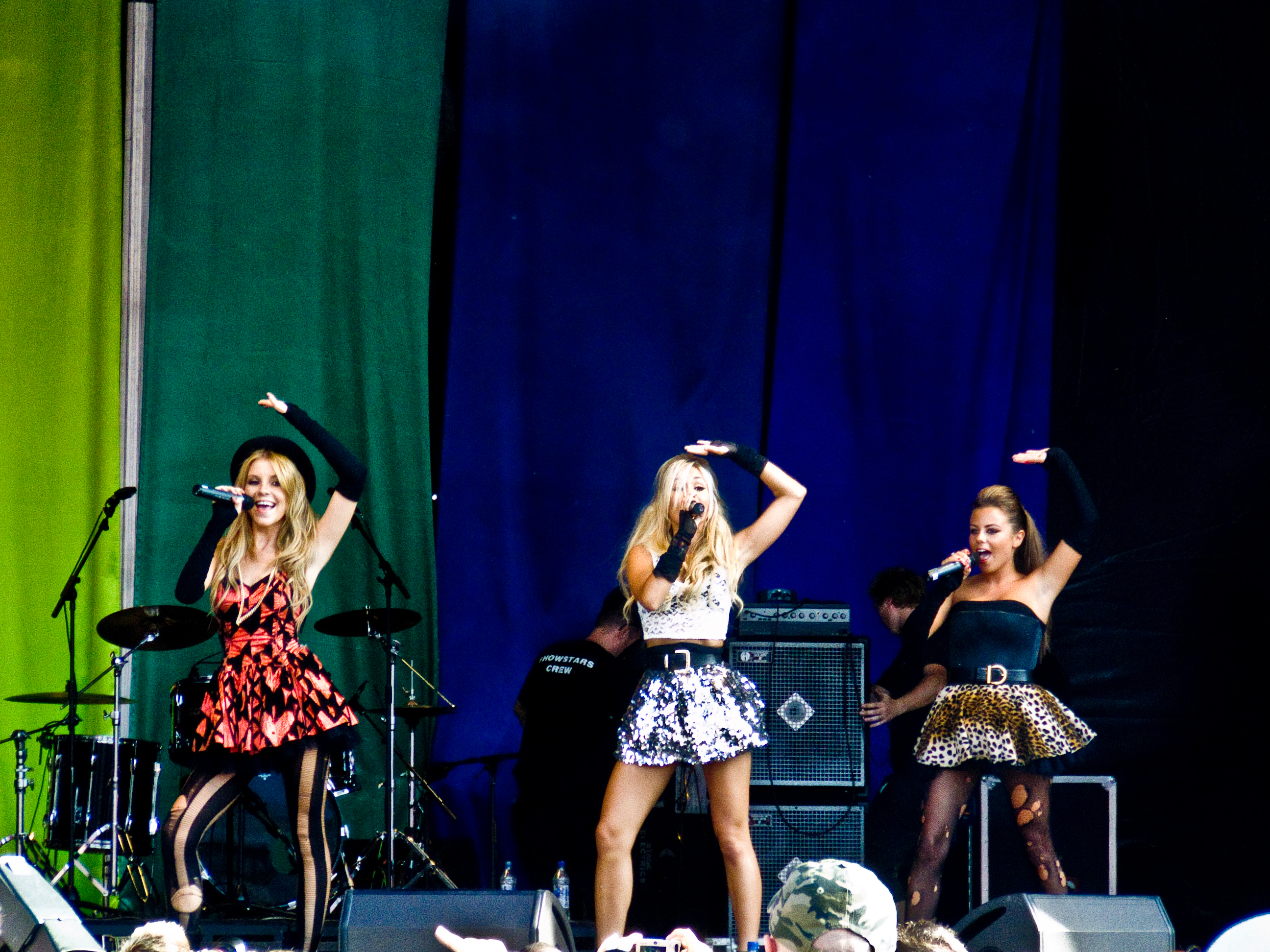

Background information
- Origin: United Kingdom
- Genres: Pop, electropop, dance, wonky pop
- Instruments: Vocals, guitars, keyboards, drums
- Years active: 2006–2013
- Labels: Parlophone/EMI (2009); RedWalk Productions (2010–2013)
- Past members: Brooke Challinor; Lucie Kay; Sophie King; Liza Owen

The Dolly Rockers were an English girl group from London, Manchester and Leeds. The group's final line-up consisted of Lucie Kay, Sophie King and Brooke Challinor. They first became known when they competed in the third series of The X Factor in 2006. In 2009, their song "Je Suis une Dolly" received an unexpected amount of airplay, receiving coverage in British tabloids and feuding with other pop groups. They were signed with EMI Parlophone, and worked with hit songwriters Ray Hedges and Nigel Butler. Their sound has been called "wonky pop" and "drunk disco", and they have described themselves as "the pop equivalent of Marmite."

The Dolly Rockers re-auditioned for The X Factor in 2013, but failed to get to bootcamp. On 10 October 2013, the group confirmed that after their failed X Factor audition, they had decided to go their separate ways after seven years together.

== Career ==
The band members met after successfully auditioning for a girl group, Innocence, advertised in The Stage. They formed the Dolly Rockers after this group failed. The name comes from a vintage clothing company. In 2006, they auditioned for the third series of The X Factor. They managed to get as far as judges' houses, but were rejected for the live shows by Louis Walsh. After The X Factor, they worked with hit songwriters Ray Hedges and Nigel Butler for a year and a half, recording material in Jersey while still working in their day jobs. They said: "A lot of people who have been on X Factor try to capitalise on the connection. We're trying to put it behind us."

The group were signed to EMI in 2009 and hit the mainstream in with the single "Je Suis Une Dolly", based on Bill Wyman's 1981 hit "(Si Si) Je Suis Un Rockstar". The song was heavily promoted by BBC Radio 1 DJ Scott Mills. The song became instantly popular, in part due to a video shot on the London Underground, that EMI decided to rush the single as a download. A new single, "Gold Digger", had been released by September 2009 and was promoted in various TV shows, with the Dolly Rockers complaining they had not yet gotten playlisted on Radio 1. A video was shot on the streets of East London.

Lucie Kay left the group in December 2009, and was replaced by Liza Owen. In August 2010, Challinor left and Kay rejoined in her place. The group signed a US record deal with RedWalk Productions (A RedOne venture with Charlie Walk) and started working on their debut album. In 2013, they reauditioned for the tenth series of The X Factor, but this time failed to get to bootcamp. On 10 October 2013, the band confirmed that after their failed X Factor audition, they had decided to go their separate ways after seven years together.

== Discography ==
Year	Title	Peak positions
Year	Title	UK
2009	"Je Suis Une Dolly"	
2009	"Gold Digger"	46
