= The Gods Themselves =

1972 science fiction novel by Isaac Asimov

- Cover of first edition (hardcover)
- Author: Isaac Asimov
- Cover artist: David November
- Genre: Science fiction
- Publisher: Doubleday
- Publication date: May 1972
- Publication place: United States
- Media type: Print (hardback and paperback)
- Pages: 288
- Awards: Hugo Award for Best Novel (1973); Nebula Award for Best Novel (1972); Locus Award for Best Novel (1973)
- ISBN: 0-385-02701-X

The Gods Themselves is a 1972 science fiction novel written by Isaac Asimov, and his first original novel in fifteen years (not counting his 1966 novelization of Fantastic Voyage). It won the Nebula Award for Best Novel in 1972, and the Hugo Award for Best Novel in 1973.

The book is divided into three main parts, which were first published in Galaxy and Worlds of If as three consecutive stories.

== Overview ==
The book is divided into three sections; the first set on Earth, the second set on a planet in a parallel universe, and the third set on a lunar colony.

In the first section, the book opens at chapter six to give context to the other chapters, and alternates timelines. Thus, the flow is Chapter six overview of Chapter one, then Chapter one. Next, is Chapter six overview of Chapter two, then Chapter two. Following chapter three to five, chapter six then concludes, and the story proceeds with chapter seven.

The main plot-line is a project by those who inhabit a parallel universe (the para-Universe) with different physical laws from this one. By exchanging matter from their universe—para-Universe—with our universe, they seek to exploit the differences in physical laws. The exchange of matter provides an alternative source of energy to maintain their universe. However, the exchange will likely result in the collapse of the Earth's Sun into a supernova, and possibly even turning a large part of the Milky Way into a quasar. There is hope among those in the para-Universe that the energy explosion does happen in our universe.

=== Timeline ===
In Part I, the novel specifically refers to the date October 3, 2070, as a date when the character Hallam entered the laboratory to work. Later in Part I, in chapter two, the book states that the character Peter Lamont had been two years old when Hallam performed the work set in 2070, and Lamont was 25 years old when he began working at the Pump Station. Accordingly, the bulk of the novel is set sometime around the year 2093. In Part III, the novel states that the Earth's population has been reduced to two billion people following a "Great Crisis". It caused significant ecological damage, with all apes except for gibbons extinct outside of zoos, and technological progress being viewed with suspicion – for example, genetic engineering research is banned outright. Part III of the novel takes place on a lunar colony with about 20,000 people, half of which were "native Lunarites". The colony is stated to be the last leftover of pre-Crisis humanity, making it the leader in many sciences.

== Plot summary ==
=== First part: Against Stupidity ===
The first part takes place on Earth, almost a century after the "Great Crisis", where ecological and economic collapse reduced the world's population from six billion to two billion. The timeline alternates between the events of the 2070s, outlining the discovery of the "electron pump," and events twenty-three years later.

In the 2070s, radiochemist Frederick Hallam discovers that a sample of tungsten has inexplicably transformed into plutonium-186—an isotope which cannot occur naturally in our universe. Hallam suggests that the matter has been exchanged by beings in a parallel universe; this leads to the development of "the Pump", a cheap, clean, and apparently endless energy source, which transports matter between our universe (in which plutonium-186 decays into tungsten-186) and a parallel universe where tungsten-186 decays into plutonium-186, yielding a nuclear reaction in the process. The development wins Hallam a Nobel Prize and great power and fame.

About 25 years later, physicist Peter Lamont, while writing a history of the Pump, comes to believe that the impetus of the Pump was the effort of the extraterrestrial "para-men". To prove his claim, Lamont enlists the help of Myron "Mike" Bronowski, an archeologist and linguist known for translating ancient Etruscan. They begin communicating with the other universe by inscribing symbols on strips of tungsten while they are exchanged. As Bronowski works, Lamont learns that use of the Pump increases the strong nuclear force inside the sun, threatens to explode Earth's sun while cooling that of the parallel universe, destroying life in both worlds. Their contacts in the parallel universe acknowledge that the Pump may be dangerous. Lamont attempts to demonstrate this to a politician and several members of the scientific community, but they refuse his request. Lamont tells the para-men to cease using the Pump, but Bronowski reveals that they have been in contact not with the other side's authorities, but with dissidents unable to stop the Pump on their side. The final message is them begging the Earth to stop.

=== Second part: The Gods Themselves ===
The second part is set in the parallel universe in which, because the nuclear force is stronger, stars are smaller and burn out faster than in our universe. It takes place on a planet orbiting a dying sun. Matter behaves differently in this universe, and substances can phase through each other and seemingly occupy the same space, giving the beings of this world unique abilities. Time also flows differently: the events take place in a seemingly short span of time in the lives of the inhabitants, whereas more than 20 years pass in our universe, and a long feeding break by one of the characters translates into a two-week gap from Lamont's perspective.

Like the first part of the novel, this section has an unusual chapter numbering. Each chapter except the last is in three parts, named e.g. "1a", "1b", and "1c", and each reflects the viewpoint of one of the three members (Odeen, Dua, and Tritt) of the "triad" central to the story's theme.

The inhabitants are of two types: the dominant "hard ones," whose bodies are solid and of a fixed shape, and the "soft ones", whose bodies are mutable and more fluid. The "soft ones" have three sexes with fixed gender roles, sexual and social norms:

- Rationals (or "lefts") are logical and scientific, use he pronouns, and produce a form of sperm. They have limited ability to pass through other bodies.
- Emotionals (or "mids") are intuitive, use she pronouns, and provide the energy needed for reproduction. Emotionals can thin themselves to pass in and out of solid materials, including rock.
- Parentals (or "rights") bear and raise offspring, and use he pronouns. Parentals have almost no ability to blend their bodies, except when helped by members of the other sexes.

The "hard ones" regulate much of "soft one" society, allocating one of each sex to a mating group called a "triad," and acting as mentors to the Rationals. All three live by photosynthesis, while sexual intercourse is accomplished by bodily collapse into a single pool (known as 'melting'). Lefts and rights can do this independently, but in the presence of a mid, the three beings completely "melt" together, causing orgasm and resulting in a period of unconsciousness and amnesia. Only during such a total "melt" can Parentals become pregnant, with the Emotional providing the energy. Triads normally produce three children; a Rational, a Parental and Emotional (in that order), after which they "pass on" and disappear forever. In the past, some triads have repeated the cycle of births to ensure population growth, but the declining amount of solar radiation no longer allows that. Emotionals (and other genders, to a very limited degree) can practice "rock-rubbing", the stigmatized act of masturbating by partially melting one's body with solid objects like rocks. Dua, the Emotional who acts as protagonist of this section of the book, appears to be the only one who practices it while married.

Little is shown of "hard" society. Dua speculates that the "hard ones" are a dying species, raising the "soft ones" as a replacement for their absent children. Odeen, the Rational of Dua's triad, dismisses this. Having had the most contact with them, he has heard them speak of a new "hard one" called Estwald, a being of extreme intelligence and the creator of the Pump.

Dua is an unusual Emotional who exhibits traits normally associated with Rationals, resulting in the nickname "left-em." While being taught by Odeen, she discovers the same supernova problem as Lamont. Outraged that the Pump is allowed to operate, she attempts to halt it, but cannot persuade her kind to abandon it. Given that their own sun and all the other stars in their universe can no longer provide the energy necessary for reproduction, they consider the possible destruction of Earth's Sun worthwhile if it might provide a more reliable source of energy.

Driven by a desire to procreate, Tritt, the "Parental" of the triad, asks Odeen to persuade Dua to facilitate in the production of their third child. When this fails, Tritt steals a battery from the Pump and rigs it to feed Dua, which stimulates the triad into a total melt, resulting in conception. Dua discovers his betrayal, and escapes to the caves of the hard ones, where she transmits the warnings Lamont received, mortally exhausting herself in the process, before she is found by her triad. Here it is revealed that the hard ones are not a separate species, but the fully mature form that triads eventually coalesce into permanently when "passing on". Each melt temporarily allows the triad to shift into their hard form, which they later forget. Odeen convinces Dua that as a hard one, they will have the influence to stop the Pump; but as their final metamorphosis begins, Dua realizes with horror that her own triad's "hard" form is the scientist Estwald.

=== Third part: Contend in Vain? ===
The third part of the novel takes place in a colony on the Moon. Lunar society is diverging radically from that of Earth: the lower gravity has produced people with very different physiques. Their food supply is manufactured from algae and distasteful to inhabitants of Earth. They enjoy low-gravity sports that would be impossible on Earth, such as an acrobatic game like "tag" performed in a huge cylinder (these sports are vital to them, since their metabolism is still that of Earthmen, and proper strenuous exercise must be maintained for it to function properly). Some Lunarites want to further adapt their bodies to life on the Moon, but Earth outlawed genetic engineering decades ago. Lunarites are beginning to see themselves as a separate race, although procreation between them and Earth people is still common. Sex, however, is problematic, as the Lunarites have much frailer bones due to the weaker gravity, so sex with an Earthborn human risks injuring them. Sexual morals are loose by Earth standards, and nudity is not taboo.

The plot centers on a cynical middle-aged ex-physicist named Denison, briefly introduced in Part 1 as Hallam's colleague and rival, whose snide remark drove Hallam to investigate the change in his sample of tungsten and, eventually, develop the Pump. Finding his career blocked by Hallam, Denison leaves science and finds success in the business world.

Denison, independently of Lamont, has deduced the danger of the Electron Pump. He visits the Moon colony hoping to work outside of Hallam's sphere of influence using Lunarite technology. He is helped by a Lunarite tour guide named Selene Lindstrom. Lindstrom is secretly an Intuitionist (a genetically engineered human with superhuman intuition), who is working with her lover, Barron Neville, as part of a group of political agitators who want independence from Earth. The group particularly wants to be allowed to research ways to use the Electron Pump on the Moon. While solar energy is plentiful enough to power their underground habitats, Neville wants to live entirely underground and never have to venture out to the surface. With the scientists' help, Denison gets access to the technology and proves that the strong force is indeed increasing, and will cause the Sun to explode.

Denison continues his work, tapping into a third parallel universe which is in a pre-Big Bang state (called "cosmic egg" or "cosmeg"), where physical laws are completely opposite to those of Dua's universe. Matter from the cosmeg starts with very weak nuclear force, and then spontaneously fuses as our universe's physical laws take over. The exchange with the second parallel universe both produces more energy at little or no cost, and balances the changes from the Electron Pump, resulting in a return to equilibrium. However, Selene clandestinely conducts another test, showing that momentum can also be exchanged with the cosmeg. Denison catches her and forces her to admit her secret purpose: Neville thinks the momentum exchange can be used to move anything without using rockets, including the Moon itself; he wants to completely break away from the Earth's orbit. Denison is appalled, although he sees the potential of the technology to make travel within the Solar System easier, and to the stars possible.

When Selene discusses Neville's plan with the rest of the group, most of them agree that moving the entire Moon would be meaningless, and building self-sufficient sublight starships would be better. A later public vote goes against Neville as well. Denison publicizes his revelations, ruining Hallam. Selene and Denison become a couple. Having received permission to conceive a second child, Selene requests Denison to be its father. The novel concludes with the two deciding to try working around their sexual incompatibility.

== Asimov's relationship to the story ==
In a letter of February 12, 1982, Asimov identified this as his favorite science fiction novel. Asimov's short story "Gold", one of the last he wrote in his life, describes the efforts of fictional computer animators to create a "compu-drama" from the novel's second section.

Asimov took the names of the immature aliens—Odeen, Dua, and Tritt—from the words One, Two, and Three in the language of his native Russia, i.e. odin (один), dva (два) and tri (три).

Asimov's inspiration for the title of the book, and its three sections, was a quotation from the play The Maid of Orleans by Friedrich Schiller: "Mit der Dummheit kämpfen Götter selbst vergebens": "Against stupidity the gods themselves contend in vain" (quoted in the book itself).

Asimov describes a conversation in January 1971 when Robert Silverberg had to refer to an isotope—just an arbitrary one—as an example. Silverberg said "plutonium-186". "There is no such isotope", said Asimov, "and such a one can't exist either". Silverberg dared Asimov to write a story about it. Later Asimov figured out under what conditions plutonium-186 could exist, and what complications and consequences it might imply. Asimov reasoned that it must belong to another universe with other physical laws; specifically, different nuclear forces necessary to allow a Pu-186 nucleus to hold itself together. He wrote down these ideas, intending to write a short story, but his editor, Larry Ashmead, asked him to expand it into a full novel. As a result of that request, Asimov wrote the second and third parts of the book.

In his autobiography, Asimov stated that the novel, especially the second section, was the "biggest and most effective over-my-head writing [that I] ever produced".

== References to science ==
At the time of writing, quasars had only recently been discovered and were not well understood. In the story Lamont suggests that quasars are in fact parts of galaxies that have undergone sudden increase in the strength of the strong nuclear force, resulting in an explosion of fusion energy. It is not certain if Asimov took into account the nature of solar fusion, where the primary reaction rate is governed by the weak nuclear force, transforming protons into neutrons, while the strong force governs the amount of energy released during reactions.

The book mentions quarks, but confines its discussion of the strong force to pions, which are the carriers of the force that binds protons and neutrons together, while gluons bind quarks within protons and neutrons. At the time, gluons were only suspected to exist while particles thought to be quarks had been observed directly.

Similarly, the Etruscan language and particularly Etruscan writings had not yet been translated and were enigmatic. As of 2022, the language's possible relation to any other known language remains unproven. The character Bronowski is imagined to have solved the puzzle by considering the Basque language, which is also unique in Europe, as a relative of ancient Etruscan. Bronowski decides to help Lamont when the president of the university refers to the language as "Itascan", confusing it with Lake Itasca. He resolves to do something that "even that knot-head will have to get straight."
