= White Gold =

White Gold may refer to:

- White gold, an alloy of gold and at least one white metal

== Music ==
- White Gold (album), a 1974 rhythm and blues album by the Love Unlimited Orchestra
- "White Gold" (Ladytron song), a song by the band Ladytron from the album Gravity the Seducer
- "White Gold" (Ten Sharp song), a b-side track by the band Ten Sharp

== Film and television ==
- White Gold (1927 film), directed by William K. Howard and starring Jetta Goudal
- White Gold (1949 film), an Austrian film directed by Eduard von Borsody
- White Gold (2003 film), a Russian action film
- White Gold (2010 film), a South African historical drama film
- "White Gold" (M*A*S*H), a 1975 episode of the television series M*A*S*H
- White Gold (TV series), a BBC comedy series set in Essex in the 1980s

== Other ==
- The Legend of White Gold, a 1988 western television film
- White Gold Wielder, a 1983 fantasy novel by Stephen R. Donaldson
- White Gold: War in Paradise, a 2008 video game
- White Gold: The Extraordinary Story of Thomas Pellow and North Africa's One Million European Slaves, a 2005 book by Giles Milton
- White gold, an obsolete term for platinum
- White gold, a nickname for porcelain

== See also ==
- Gold (disambiguation)
