= The Rise & Fall of Loverboy =

Studio album by Sir Sly
- Released: April 23, 2021
- Genre: Alternative rock; alternative hip-hop; electronica; indie pop; indie rock; psychedelic pop
- Length: 48:42
- Label: Interscope
- Producer: Sir Sly

Sir Sly chronology
Don't You Worry, Honey (2017)	The Rise & Fall of Loverboy (2021)

Singles from The Rise & Fall of Loverboy
- 1. "Material Boy" Released: September 18, 2020; 2. "Little Deaths" Released: December 4, 2020; 3. "Citizen" Released: January 20, 2021

The Rise & Fall of Loverboy is the third studio album by American indie rock band Sir Sly. The album was released on April 23, 2021 through Interscope Records.

== Track listing ==
All music is composed by Landon Jacobs, Jason Suwito, and Hayden Coplen.

No.	Title	Length
1.	"Honey"	5:03
2.	"Loverboy"	2:43
3.	"Welcomes the Pressure"	3:14
4.	"Citizen" (featuring Gary Clark, Jr.)	4:22
5.	"Numb"	4:24
6.	"Are We Having Any Fun?"	3:02
7.	"thx."	1:54
8.	"Material Boy"	3:44
9.	"Sick Sick [Sic]"	2:54
10.	"I.M.G."	2:57
11.	"Little Deaths"	4:16
12.	"All I Want to Do Is Cry (In the Club)"	2:14
13.	"Doomsday"	3:37
14.	"Birds"	4:09
Total length:		48:42

== Critical reception ==
Professional ratings
Review scores
Source	Rating
American Songwriter	3.5/5 stars
Glide Magazine	4/5 stars
Idiot Check	7.2/10
mxdwn	3/5 stars
PopMatters	7/10

The Rise & Fall of Loverboy received positive critical reception. Steve Horowitz, writing for PopMatters gave the album a 7 out of 10 rating, stating that the album is very self-aware; he noted that the album "is personal" but that the band "understands they are part of a larger society with its own problems." Horowitz summarizes the album as being eclectic, saying "The Rise & Fall of Loverboy is one of those odd albums whose musical styles and themes seem to vary wildly from track to track and even within individual songs themselves. Paradoxically, it is this feature that ties everything together." Horowitz described the album as a mix of alternative rock, indie pop, indie rock, and psychedelic pop. Jason Scott, writing for American Songwriter said of the album's sound that "such emotional threads knot and form the backbone of the record, frequently flooding the senses with frothy R&B elixirs and other genre-blurring mix-ups."

Writing for Glide Magazine, Jeremy Lukens positively described The Rise & Fall of Loverboy as "an upbeat amalgamation of rock, electronica, and hip-hop that straddles the line between pop entertainment and art. With no shortage of hooks, Sir Sly takes listeners on a journey of introspection, acceptance, and self-sabotage through infectious grooves and danceable beats." Lukens further stated that the album "is indie-pop with a thick finishing coat painted on a jagged surface, catchy and rhythmic but with an aura of danger."
