= Touch Me (I Want Your Body) =

1986 song performed by Samantha Fox

- Standard international picture sleeve for seven-inch releases

Single by Samantha Fox

from the album Touch Me
- B-side: "Never Gonna Fall in Love Again"; "Drop Me a Line"
- Released: 10 March 1986
- Studio: Battery (London)
- Genre: Dance-pop
- Length: 3:46
- Label: Jive
- Songwriters: Mark Shreeve; Jon Astrop; Pete Q. Harris
- Producers: Jon Astrop; Pete Q. Harris

Samantha Fox singles chronology
"Aim to Win" (1984)	"Touch Me (I Want Your Body)" (1986)	"Do Ya Do Ya (Wanna Please Me)" (1986)

Music video
- "Touch Me (I Want Your Body)" on YouTube

"Touch Me (I Want Your Body)" is a song by the English pop singer Samantha Fox from her debut studio album, Touch Me (1986). A successful topless model, Fox had been invited to attend an open audition for Jive Records, as the label was seeking "a British Madonna" to sing the song. She was offered a five-album deal.

Written by Mark Shreeve, Jon Astrop, and Pete Q. Harris, and produced by the latter two, "Touch Me" was released on 10 March 1986 as Fox's debut single and the lead single from the Touch Me album. It was a worldwide success, peaking at number three on the UK singles chart and number four on the US Billboard Hot 100 while topping the charts in Australia, Canada, Finland, Greece, Norway, Portugal, Sweden and Switzerland.

== Lyrics and music video ==
The song is about her searching for a man. The accompanying music video featured Fox performing to a packed crowd wearing ripped jeans and a denim jacket. During the song, she pulls a young man from the crowd and teases him before moving on to someone else. Fox declined suggestions she film a raunchy video with bed sequences, insisting a concert performance scenario would better serve her ambitions to be taken seriously, and feeling the song's lyrics were already sexy enough.

== Track listings ==
- 7-inch single
1. "Touch Me (I Want Your Body)" – 3:44
2. "Never Gonna Fall in Love Again" – 5:06
- 7-inch single (US and Canada)
1. "Touch Me (I Want Your Body)" – 3:44
2. "Drop Me a Line" – 3:46
- 12-inch single
1. "Touch Me (I Want Your Body)" (extended version) – 5:19
2. "Never Gonna Fall in Love Again" – 5:07
- 12-inch maxi single – Remixes
1. "Touch Me (I Want Your Body)" (blue mix) – 5:49
2. "Touch Me (I Want Your Body)" (alternative version) – 4:09
3. "Tonight's the Night" – 3:16
- US 12-inch maxi single
1. "Touch Me (I Want Your Body)" (extended version) – 5:19
2. "Touch Me (I Want Your Body)" – 3:44
3. "Touch Me (I Want Your Body)" (blue mix) – 5:49
4. "Touch Me (I Want Your Body)" (alternative version) – 4:09
5. "Drop Me a Line" – 3:47

== Charts ==
=== Weekly charts ===
1986–1987 weekly chart performance for "Touch Me (I Want Your Body)"
Chart (1986–1987)	Peak position
Australia (Kent Music Report)	1
Austria (Ö3 Austria Top 40)	2
Belgium (Ultratop 50 Flanders)	8
Canada Retail Singles (The Record)	1
Canada Top Singles (RPM)	1
Europe (European Hot 100 Singles)	11
Finland (Suomen virallinen lista)	1
France (SNEP)	4
Greece	1
Ireland (IRMA)	3
Italy (Musica e dischi)	3
Luxembourg (Radio Luxembourg)	2
Netherlands (Dutch Top 40)	10
Netherlands (Single Top 100)	12
New Zealand (Recorded Music NZ)	5
Norway (VG-lista)	1
Portugal	1
Quebec (ADISQ)	2
South Africa (Springbok Radio)	24
Spain (AFYVE)	10
Sweden (Sverigetopplistan)	1
Switzerland (Schweizer Hitparade)	1
UK Singles (Official Charts)	3
US Billboard Hot 100	4
US 12-inch Singles Sales (Billboard)	27
US Dance Club Play (Billboard)	41
US Cash Box Top 100	7
West Germany (GfK)	4

=== Year-end charts ===
1986 year-end chart performance for "Touch Me (I Want Your Body)"
Chart (1986)	Position
Australia (Kent Music Report)	3
Austria (Ö3 Austria Top 40)	12
Belgium (Ultratop 50 Flanders)	44
Europe (European Hot 100 Singles)	3
Netherlands (Dutch Top 40)	98
Netherlands (Single Top 100)	64
New Zealand (RIANZ)	26
Switzerland (Schweizer Hitparade)	2
UK Singles (OCC)	30
West Germany (Media Control)	7

1987 year-end chart performance for "Touch Me (I Want Your Body)"
Chart (1987)	Position
Canada Top Singles (RPM)	3
US Billboard Hot 100	44

=== Anniversary charts ===
1985–1989 chart performance for "Touch Me (I Want Your Body)"
Chart (1985–1989)	Position
Five Years (European Hot 100 Singles)	89

== Certifications ==
Certifications and sales for "Touch Me (I Want Your Body)"
Region	Certification	Certified units/sales
Canada (Music Canada)	Platinum	100,000^{^}
France (SNEP)	Silver	250,000^{*}
United Kingdom (BPI)	Silver	250,000
^{*} Sales figures based on certification alone.^{^} Shipments figures based on certification alone.

== Günther featuring Samantha Fox version ==
"Touch Me"

Single by Günther featuring Samantha Fox

from the album Pleasureman
- Released: 2004
- Length: 3:38
- Label: Warner Music Sweden
- Songwriters: Mark Shreeve; Jon Astrop; Pete Harris
- Producers: Robert Uhlmann; Anderz Wrethov; Alex Labaf

Günther singles chronology
"Teeny Weeny String Bikini" (2004)	"Touch Me" (2004)	"Crazy and Wild" (2004)

Samantha Fox singles chronology
"Perhaps" (1998)	"Touch Me" (2004)	"Angel with an Attitude" (2005)

Music video
- "Touch Me" on YouTube

In 2004, the Swedish Europop singer Günther covered the song for his debut studio album, Pleasureman (2004). His version features new vocals by Fox, who also appears in the accompanying music video.

=== Charts ===
==== Weekly charts ====
Weekly chart performance for "Touch Me"
Chart (2004–2005)	Peak position
Denmark (Tracklisten)	12
Finland (Suomen virallinen lista)	3
Norway (VG-lista)	7
Sweden (Sverigetopplistan)	1

==== Year-end charts ====
Year-end chart performance for "Touch Me"
Chart (2004)	Position
Sweden (Hitlistan)	51
