= Don't You Worry, Honey =

Studio album by Sir Sly
- Released: June 30, 2017
- Genres: Indie pop; alternative rock
- Length: 38:54
- Label: Interscope
- Producer: Sir Sly

Sir Sly chronology
You Haunt Me (2014)	Don't You Worry, Honey (2017)	The Rise & Fall of Loverboy (2021)

Singles from You Haunt Me
- 1. "High" Released: March 24, 2017; 2. "Altar" Released: June 1, 2017; 3. "Astronaut" Released: June 15, 2017; 4. "&Run" Released: December 7, 2017; 5. "Change" Released: February 12, 2018

Don't You Worry, Honey is the second studio album by American indie pop trio Sir Sly. It was released on June 30, 2017, by Interscope Records.

== Track listing ==
All lyrics are written by Hayden Coplen, Landon Jacobs, Jason Suwito; all music is composed by Hayden Coplen, Landon Jacobs, Jason Suwito unless otherwise stated

No.	Title	Music	Length
1.	"High"		3:52
2.	"Change"	Chancelor Bennett; Hayden Coplen; Jeff Gitelman; Landon Jacobs; Greg Landfair, Jr.; Nico Segal; Jason Suwito; Peter Wilkins	3:40
3.	"&Run"		3:47
4.	"Altar"	Coplen; Jacobs; Suwito; Peter Yorke	3:42
5.	"Fun"	Coplen; Andy Hernandez; Jacobs; Suwito	3:53
6.	"Astronaut"		3:44
7.	"2am"		3:33
8.	"Trippin'"	Hayden Coplen; Andraé Crouch; Jacobs; Quincy Jones; Bill Maxwell; Gunter Platzek; David Del Sesto; David Francis Del Sesto; Jason Suwito	3:44
9.	"Headfirst"	Coplen; Jacobs; François de Roubaix; Suwito	3:33
10.	"Oh Mama"		5:33
Total length:			38:54

== Critical reception ==
Professional ratings
Review scores
Source	Rating
Atwood	10/10

Despite having two songs that charted in the Billboard Alternative and Rock Songs list, the album was not heavily reviewed by mainstream contemporary music critics.

== Personnel ==
The following individuals were credited for composing the album.

- Chancellor Bennett — Composer
- Hayden Coplen — Composer
- Andraé Crouch — Composer
- François de Roubaix — Composer
- David Francis Del Sesto — Composer
- Jeff Gitelman — Composer
- Andy Hernandez — Composer
- Landon Jacobs — Composer
- Quincy Jones — Composer

- Greg Landfair Jr. — Composer
- Bill Maxwell — Composer
- Gunter Platzek — Composer
- Nico Segal — Composer
- David Del Sesto — Composer
- Sir Sly — Primary Artist
- Jason Suwito — Composer
- Peter Wilkins — Composer
- Peter Yorke — Composer

== Charting ==
The album did not chart, however two tracks, High and &Run, made the Top 10 on the Alternative Songs chart.; only being available digitally and on vinyl may have depressed the album's charting.
