= Gold Mine =

Gold Mine may refer to:

- Gold Mine (board game)
- Gold Mine (Long Beach), an arena
- Gold Mine, an album by Stephen Day
- "Gold Mine", a song by Joyner Lucas from the 2020 album ADHD

== See also ==
- Gold (1974 film), based on the novel Gold Mine by Wilbur Smith
- Gold mining
- Goldmine (disambiguation)
