= You Haunt Me =

Studio album by Sir Sly
- Released: September 16, 2014
- Genre: Indie pop; dark pop; trance
- Length: 40:08
- Label: Interscope
- Producer: Sir Sly

Sir Sly chronology
Gold (2013)	You Haunt Me (2014)	Don't You Worry, Honey (2017)

You Haunt Me is the first studio album by indie pop trio Sir Sly. It was released on September 16, 2014 by Interscope Records.

== Track listing ==
No.	Title	Length
1.	"Where I'm Going"	3:18
2.	"Ghost"	3:37
3.	"Gold"	3:52
4.	"You Haunt Me"	3:42
5.	"Found You Out"	3:37
6.	"Nowhere / Bloodlines, Pt. I"	4:30
7.	"Inferno" (featuring Lizzy Plapinger)	2:50
8.	"Leave You"	3:13
9.	"Floods"	3:32
10.	"Too Far Gone"	3:26
11.	"Helpless / Bloodlines, Pt. II"	4:25
12.	"The First Stone" (iTunes bonus track)	3:28
13.	"Witches" (Spotify bonus track)	3:30
