= Sir Sly =

American indie rock band

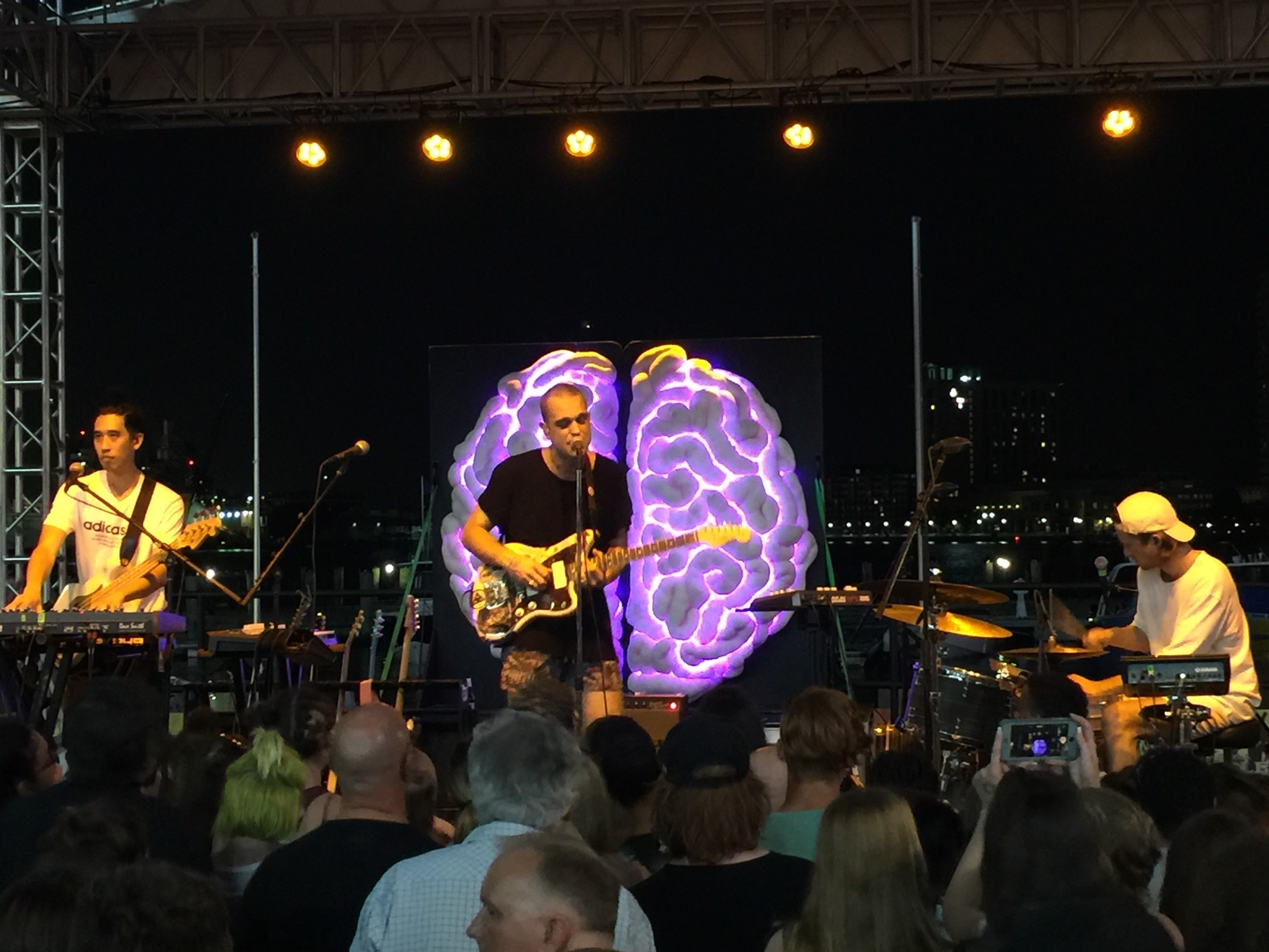
- Sir Sly live in Norfolk Virginia in 2018

Background information
- Origin: Los Angeles, California, U.S.
- Genres: Indie pop; alternative rock; psychedelic pop
- Years active: 2012–present
- Labels: Interscope; National Anthem; Neon Gold; Cherrytree
- Members: Landon Jacobs; Jason Suwito; Hayden Coplen
- Website: sir-sly.com

Sir Sly is an American indie pop band formed and based in Orange County, California, United States. The band is fronted by vocalist Landon Jacobs with instrumentalists Jason Suwito and Hayden Coplen accompanying him. The trio gradually built a steady following and managed to top The Hype Machine chart, eventually revealing their identities.

Their debut single, "Ghost", was released on March 4, 2013, on the National Anthem and Neon Gold labels followed by the single "Gold" on May 21, 2013. "Gold" peaked at No. 27 on the Billboard Alternative Songs chart and No. 45 on the Rock Airplay chart. "Gold" is also featured in the video game, MLB 14: The Show.

They gained international fame after the Assassin's Creed IV: Black Flag accolade trailer was released in which their song "Gold" was used.

Their debut album You Haunt Me was released on September 16, 2014.

Their song "Gold", remixed by Betablock3r, has been featured in a Cadillac advertisement.

Their single "You Haunt Me" peaked at number 3 on Sirius XM's Alt 18 countdown on Alt Nation during the week of October 18, 2014.

On March 11, 2016, the band released the song "Expectations". According to the band, "Expectations" was one of the first songs written for their second album, yet as the music grew it no longer fit with the sound of the album and is now a standalone single.

Their single "High" held the number two spot on Sirius XM's Alt 18 Countdown for three weeks and remained on the countdown for 19 weeks from April 22, 2017 to August 26, 2017. The song was featured on the television shows 13 Reasons Why, Riverdale and Lucifer and the film Happy Death Day. The song was also used by NBC on every broadcast of Sunday Night Football in 2017 and 2018.

== Discography ==
=== Studio albums ===
List of studio albums, with selected chart positions
Title	Album details	Peak chart positions		
Title	Album details	US	US Alt.	US Rock
You Haunt Me	Released: September 16, 2014 (US); Label: Interscope; Formats: CD, LP, digital download	76	14	27
Don't You Worry, Honey	Released: June 30, 2017; Label: Interscope; Formats: CD, LP, digital download	—	—	—
The Rise & Fall of Loverboy	Released: April 23, 2021; Label: Interscope; Formats: CD, LP, digital download	—	—	—

=== Extended plays ===
List of extended plays
Title	Album details
Gold	Released: May 21, 2013 (US); Label: Interscope; Formats: Digital download

=== Singles ===
List of singles, with selected chart positions, showing year released and album name
Title	Year	Peak chart positions			Album
Title	Year	US Alt.	US Rock	CAN Rock	Album
"Easy Now"	2013	—	—	—	Non-album single
"Ghost"	2013	—	—	—	Gold EP
"Gold"	2013	27	— (Note: "Gold" did not enter the Hot Rock Songs chart, but peaked at number 36 on the Rock Airplay chart.)	—	Gold EP
"Miracle"	2013	—	—	—	Non-album single
"You Haunt Me"	2014	—	—	—	You Haunt Me
"Expectations"	2016	—	—	—	Non-album single
"High"	2017	3	18	8	Don't You Worry, Honey
"Altar"	2017	—	—	—	Don't You Worry, Honey
"Astronaut"	2017	—	—	—	Don't You Worry, Honey
"&Run"	2017	3	17	27	Don't You Worry, Honey
"All Your Love"	2020	—	—	—	Non-album single
"Material Boy"	2020	39	—	—	The Rise & Fall of Loverboy
"Little Deaths"	2020	—	—	—	The Rise & Fall of Loverboy
"Citizen" (featuring Gary Clark Jr.)	2021	—	—	—	The Rise & Fall of Loverboy
"—" denotes a recording that did not chart or was not released in that territory.

== Other releases ==
In October 2015, Raeko (the alter ego of Suwito) recorded the song "Back 2 U" with Maya Tuttle of American majestic rock ensemble The Colourist.

After touring with the band Joywave in 2018, Suwito formed the group Best Frenz with Joywave musician Daniel Armbruster. The duo released the EP 30% Off in 2021 and the LP The Mall in 2023.
