= Red gold (disambiguation) =

Red gold is a gold alloy with at least one other metal (e.g. copper).

Red gold or Red Gold may also refer to:

- Toona ciliata, the deciduous Australian red cedar tree
- Red Gold potato, Solanum tuberosum
- Red Gold (EP), by Red Krayola
- Red Gold (film), a Mexican film also known as Oro rojo
- Peperone crusco, Italian dried pepper
- Copper, a phrase used to highlight the value and prestige attributed to copper in various parts of Africa

== See also ==
- Gold (disambiguation)
