= Black and Gold (disambiguation) =

"Black and Gold" is a 2008 song by Sam Sparro.

Black and Gold may also refer to:

- Black and Gold (book), a 1987 book by Anthony Sampson
- "Black and Gold" (Cornish song), a Cornish folk song
- Black + Gold, a 2007 EP by Sam Sparro
- "Black & Gold", a song by Sivert Høyem featured in the opening sequence of the Norwegian television show Okkupert
- Anarcho-capitalism, symbolized by black and gold
- A nickname for the American Pittsburgh Steelers football team, based on their black and gold team colors
- Black and Gold, a brand of IGA Supermarkets Australia

== See also ==
- Black-and-gold tanager, bird found in Colombia
- Black-and-gold cotinga, bird found in Brazil
- Black Gold (disambiguation)
