= Do Ya Do Ya (Wanna Please Me) =

1986 single by Samantha Fox

- Standard picture sleeve for 7-inch single release

Single by Samantha Fox

from the album Touch Me
- B-side: "Drop Me a Line"; "Want You to Want Me"; "Never Gonna Fall in Love Again"
- Released: 16 June 1986
- Studio: Battery (London, England)
- Length: 3:48
- Label: Jive
- Songwriters: Graham Richardson; Mike Bissell
- Producers: Steve Lovell; Steve Power

Samantha Fox singles chronology
"Touch Me (I Want Your Body)" (1986)	"Do Ya Do Ya (Wanna Please Me)" (1986)	"Hold On Tight" (1986)

Music video
- "Do Ya Do Ya (Wanna Please Me)" on YouTube

"Do Ya Do Ya (Wanna Please Me)" is a song by British singer Samantha Fox, released as the second single from her debut album, Touch Me (1986). The song was her second consecutive number one in Finland and Sweden, supplanting "Touch Me (I Want Your Body)". It was also a top ten hit in the UK, Switzerland, and Germany. The lyrics taunt the listener with lines such as "Are you strong enough?" and "I could get you underneath my thumb". Fox performed the song on a 1986 episode of Top of the Pops, and to this day remains a recurring feature of her live repertoire.

The song has been called one of Fox's "prime examples of classic 1980s pop" along with the single "Touch Me (I Want Your Body)".

== Music video ==
The accompanying music video for "Do Ya Do Ya (Wanna Please Me)" begins with Samantha Fox emerging from a limousine in a ruffled shirt and studded black leather jacket. Her valet looking on, Fox performs the number with her band while pulling several pranks on them. The clip featured members of The Cherry Bombz; Nasty Suicide, Timo "Timppa" Kaltio, Terry Chimes and Dave Tregunna as Fox's band.

== Track listings ==
- 12-inch vinyl UK (0577346)
1. "Do Ya Do Ya (Wanna Please Me)" (Vixen Mix) (6:13)
2. "Do Ya Do Ya (Wanna Please Me)" (Extended Version) (5:18)
- 12-inch vinyl Germany (6.20627 AE)
1. "Do Ya Do Ya (Wanna Please Me)" (Foxy Mix) (6:13)
2. "Do Ya Do Ya (Wanna Please Me)" (Extended Version) (5:18)
3. "Drop Me a Line" (3:48)
- 12-inch vinyl US (1033-1-JD)
1. "Do Ya Do Ya (Wanna Please Me)" (Extended Version) (5:18)
2. "Do Ya Do Ya (Wanna Please Me)" (7-inch Version) (3:48)
3. "Do Ya Do Ya (Wanna Please Me)" (Vixen Mix) (6:13)
4. "Do Ya Do Ya (Wanna Please Me)" (Instrumental Version) (3:48)
5. "Want You to Want Me" (3:30)
- 7-inch vinyl UK (FOXY 2)
1. "Do Ya Do Ya (Wanna Please Me)" (3:48)
2. "Never Gonna Fall in Love Again" (5:10)
- 7-inch vinyl CAN (1031-7-J)
1. "Do Ya Do Ya (Wanna Please Me)" (3:48)
2. "Want You to Want Me" (3:30)

== Charts ==
=== Weekly charts ===
Chart (1986–1987)	Peak position
Australia (Kent Music Report)	18
Austria (Ö3 Austria Top 40)	11
Belgium (Ultratop 50 Flanders)	9
Canada Top Singles (RPM)	39
Europe (European Hot 100 Singles)	23
Finland (Suomen virallinen lista)	1
France (SNEP)	20
Italy (Musica e dischi)	13
Luxembourg (Radio Luxembourg)	4
Netherlands (Dutch Top 40)	34
Netherlands (Single Top 100)	35
New Zealand (Recorded Music NZ)	29
Norway (VG-lista)	6
Quebec (ADISQ)	17
Spain (AFYVE)	38
Sweden (Sverigetopplistan)	1
Switzerland (Schweizer Hitparade)	4
UK Singles (Official Charts)	10
US Billboard Hot 100	87
West Germany (GfK)	5

=== Year-end charts ===
Chart (1986)	Position
West Germany (Media Control)	47
