= Ding Dong Song =

Single by Günther

from the album Pleasureman
- Released: 21 January 2004
- Recorded: 2004
- Genre: Eurodance; musical parody
- Length: 4:04
- Label: Warner Bros. Sweden; Independence; Electric Avenue
- Songwriters: Anderz Wrethov; Mats Söderlund
- Producer: Anderz Wrethov

Günther singles chronology
"Ding Dong Song" (2004)	"Teeny Weeny String Bikini" (2004)

"Ding Dong Song" is a song by the Swedish pop singer Günther, featuring the Sunshine Girls, based on the 1984 Dutch song "Tralala" by Phill & Company which was written by Ad van Olm and Eddy Ouwens. "Ding Dong Song" was released in 2004 on Günther's debut studio album, Pleasureman. The song was number one for three weeks on the Swedish music charts.

== Background and recording ==
Günther's version is sung in English with a heavy German accent. The song is a parody of Eurodance genres, especially those from the 1980s and 1990s in Germany.

The song gained widespread popularity on YouTube with one example being Louis and Zach's parody in which they film themselves in front of their computer lip-syncing to the song. As of 2025 this video by Louis and Zach's has received over 22 million views on YouTube. The song has also received numerous other fan-made parodies as well as US soldiers in Iraq dancing to the song.

== Charts ==
=== Weekly charts ===
Chart (2004)	Peak position
Belgium (Ultratop 50 Flanders)	43
Belgium (Ultratop 50 Wallonia)	31
Finland (Suomen virallinen lista)	16
Germany (GfK)	93
Ireland (IRMA)	12
Norway (VG-lista)	6
Scottish Singles Sales (Official Charts)	12
Sweden (Sverigetopplistan)	1
Switzerland (Schweizer Hitparade)	95
UK Singles (Official Charts)	14

=== Year-end charts ===
Chart (2004)	Position
Sweden (Hitlistan)	7

== Certifications ==
Region	Certification	Certified units/sales
Norway (IFPI Norway)	Gold	5,000^{*}
Sweden (GLF)	Gold	10,000^{^}
^{*} Sales figures based on certification alone.^{^} Shipments figures based on certification alone.
