= Günther (singer) =

Swedish singer (born 1967)

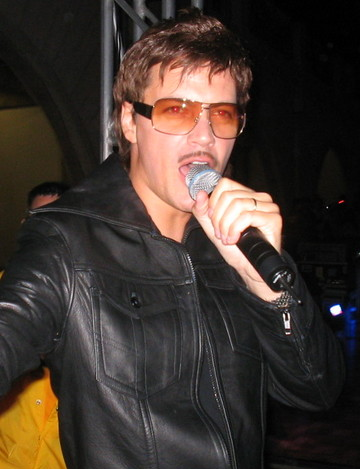
- Günther in 2007

Background information
- Also known as: Pleasureman
- Born: Mats Olle Söderlund; 25 July 1967 (age 59); Malmö, Sweden
- Genres: Europop; Eurodance; parody
- Occupation: Singer
- Years active: 2004–present
- Website: gunther-official.com

Mats Söderlund (born 25 July 1967), better known by his stage name Günther, is a Swedish singer.

== Career ==
Söderlund was a model in his youth, and later the owner of two nightclubs in Malmö.

Günther's 2004 song "Ding Dong Song" became popular in Sweden. The song (which featured Günther's backup singers, the Sunshine Girls) topped the Swedish charts in 2004 and would go on to be featured on his album Pleasureman.

In December 2013, Günther released the single "I'm Not Justin Bieber, Bitch". The song features strong electro house influences in its sound. The track's music video went viral, gaining momentum among fans and having 5.6 million views as of mid-2023.

== Discography ==
=== Studio albums ===
- Pleasureman (2004, Sweden; 2006, US; 2007, Japan)

=== Singles ===
- "Ding Dong Song" (with the Sunshine Girls) (2004)
- "Teeny Weeny String Bikini" (with the Sunshine Girls) (2004)
- "Touch Me" (with Samantha Fox) (2004)
- "Crazy and Wild" (with the Sunshine Girls) (2004)
- "Tutti Frutti Summer Love" (with the Sunshine Girls) (2005)
- "Christmas Song (Ding Dong)" (with the Sunshine Girls) (2005)
- "Like Fire Tonight" (with the Sunshine Girls) (2006)
- "Sun Trip (Summer Holiday)" (with the Sunshine Girls) (2007)
- "Famous" (with the Sunshine Girls) (2010)
- "Pussycat" (with the Sunshine Girls) (2011)
- "I'm Not Justin Bieber, Bitch" (2013)
- "No Pantalones" (featuring the Sunshine Girls) (2016)
- "Love Yourself" (with D'Sanz) (2016)
- "Dynamite" (with Blizz Bugaddi) (2017)
- "Sex Myself" (2022)
- "Coupe de Main" (2023)
- "Real Sassy" (2023)
- "Shut Up (Dance with Me)" (2024)
- "XXX" (with GPF) (2024)

=== Guest appearances ===
- "Just Do It" (DJ Oku Luukkainen and Teflon Brothers) (2021)
