= Gold Digger (Dolly Rockers song) =

Single by The Dolly Rockers
- B-side: "Je Suis une Dolly"
- Released: 30 August 2009
- Recorded: 2009
- Genre: Pop, wonky pop
- Length: 3:04
- Label: Parlophone
- Songwriter(s): August Darnell, Chris Frantz, Tina Weymouth, Steven Stanley, Ray Hedges, Nigel Butler, John Pickering, David King, Brooke Challinor, Sophie King, Lucie Kay
- Producer(s): Ray Hedges, Nigel Butler

The Dolly Rockers singles chronology
"Je Suis une Dolly" (2009)	"Gold Digger" (2009)	"Automatic Girl" (2010)

"Gold Digger" is a song by English girl group the Dolly Rockers. It was released digitally in the United Kingdom on 30 August 2009 and physically the day after. The track heavily borrows from Kid Creole and the Coconuts' 1982 song "Stool Pigeon" and Tom Tom Club's 1981 song "Wordy Rappinghood".

== Reception ==
Nick Levine of Digital Spy referred to "Gold Digger" as "the pop equivalent of flicking through OK! and having a bitch about the Z-listers inside—and every bit as fun as that sounds." Grant of the BBC Chart Blog called it a "very decent debut" and wrote that "[t]he 'wonky' pop sound gets you bopping from the off and the quirkyness of their style matches the eccentricity of the song." However, he criticised the track by stating that "fame hungry girls talking about other fame hungry girls is a touch hypocritical", while noting the lack of "a killer melody to match the killer dance/pop production". ILikeMusic described the song as a "barn-storming and truly inspired collision of the Tom Tom Club's 'Wordyrappinghood' and Kid Creole's 'Stool Pigeon'", naming it "one of the greatest pop tunes of 2009" as well as "both a social diatribe and bangin' floor-filler."

The single reached number forty-six on the UK Singles Chart, where it spent one week only.

== Music video ==
The unreleased original music video for "Gold Digger", directed by David Allain and produced by Sarah Tognazzi for Pulse Films, was shot in East London on 27 May 2009. The video stars Christopher Goh as city boy, Gavin Molloy as rock star, Ben Baker as young boy, Stephen Kelly as victim, Mehran Armando as Antony and various other actors as newspaper seller and victims of a gorgeous, sexy and glamorous gold digger.

The released video for the song, directed by James Abadi through Fingertip Films and cinematographed by Hazel Palmer, was shot in the River Island shop on London's Oxford Street. It premiered on Parlophone's YouTube channel, the 2D version on 24 July 2009, and the 3D version on 4 September 2009.

== Track listings ==
- UK CD single
1. "Gold Digger" – 2:55
2. "Gold Digger" (Bimbo Jones Remix) – 2:53
- UK iTunes single
1. "Gold Digger" (Radio Edit) – 2:55
2. "Je Suis une Dolly" – 2:53
- UK promo CD single – Remixes
1. "Gold Digger" (Bimbo Jones Club Mix) – 6:24
2. "Gold Digger" (Superbass Mix) – 6:52
3. "Gold Digger" (Bimbo Jones Radio Edit) – 2:52
4. "Gold Digger" (Original Radio Edit) – 2:53

== Personnel ==
Credits adapted from CD single liner notes.

- David Bascombe – mixing
- Nigel Butler – additional mixing, bass, guitar, producer
- Andy Fallon – photography
- Ray Hedges – additional mixing, producer
- A. Rowland – mixing assistant
- Traffic – design

== Charts ==
Chart (2009)	Peak position
UK Singles Chart	46

== Release history ==
Region	Date	Label	Format
United Kingdom	30 August 2009	Parlophone	Digital download
United Kingdom	31 August 2009	Parlophone	CD single
