= The Instability =

1989 science fiction short story by Isaac Asimov

"The Instability" is a science fiction short story by American writer Isaac Asimov. It was first published in the 1 January 1989 issue of The Observer and reprinted in the collection Gold (1995).

== Plot summary ==
A professor tells his colleague he has made time travel possible. He also tells him that according to his calculations, there will be another star in the Sun's place in 27 million years.

The professor makes a trip with his colleague through time to observe the dark star. After making some notes, they decide to return home. When they time travel back, the colleague notices that there is black space outside. The professor explains that time and space move, so their universe has moved in an upper-dimensional level. This means they are in primeval chaos. His colleague points out that since they are here this is not primeval chaos anymore. The professor states that his partner is right and that they have introduced an instability, but he never finishes the sentence. They are all wiped out by a Big Bang as a new universe is created.
