= GOLD =

GOLD may refer to:

- Gold (disambiguation)

== Science and technology ==
- Gold, a chemical element
- Genomes OnLine Database
- Global-scale Observations of the Limb and Disk, a NASA Explorer Mission of Opportunity
- GOLD (parser), an open-source parser-generator of BNF-based grammars
- Graduates of the Last Decade, an Institute of Electrical and Electronics Engineers program to garner more university level student members
- Global Initiative for Chronic Obstructive Lung Disease, guidelines for aiding chronic obstructive lung disease from the National Heart, Lung, and Blood Institute and the World Health Organization
- Gathered or linked data, in the staging tables of a data warehouse

== Other uses ==
- GOLD (ontology), an ontology for descriptive linguistics
- U&Gold, British television channel formerly stylised as "GOLD"

== See also ==
- Gold (disambiguation)
