= High (Sir Sly song) =

Single by Sir Sly

from the album Don't You Worry, Honey
- Released: March 24, 2017
- Genre: Alternative rock; indie pop
- Length: 3:52
- Label: Interscope
- Songwriters: Hayden Coplen; Landon Jacobs; Jason Suwito
- Producer: Tiffany Suh

Sir Sly singles chronology
"Expectations" (2016)	"High" (2017)	"Altar" (2017)

Music video
- "High" on YouTube

"High" is the fourth single by American indie pop band Sir Sly. The song is the lead single from the band's second album, Don't You Worry, Honey. The song was released on March 24, 2017 through Interscope Records.

Commercially, "High" is the most successful song to date by Sir Sly. The song climbed to number 3 on the US Alternative Songs charts, making it the highest-charting single to date by the band. Additionally, the song hit number 18 on the US Rock Songs chart, and number 7 on the US Rock Airplay chart. The song was also the first by the band to chart in Canada, reaching number 8 on the Canadian Rock-Alternative chart.

High also reached the number 2 spot on SiriusXM's Alt 18 Countdown for 3 weeks and remained on the countdown for 19 weeks from April 22, 2017 to August 26, 2017. The song was featured on the television shows 13 Reasons Why, Riverdale, Lucifer and Inhumans, and the film Happy Death Day.

== Music video ==
The music video for the track was released on April 19, 2017. The video features members of the band doing a choreographic dance in a warehouse. The video was directed by Kevin Clark. The outfits in the music video were designed by Clayton Beisner and Yazz Alali. The visual effects were undertaken by Tanner Merrill.

== In media ==
The song's instrumental was used by NBC Sunday Night Football during the 2018 NFL season as background for broadcast graphics.

== Track listing ==
No.	Title	Length
1.	"High"	3:52
Total length:		3:52

== Charts ==
=== Weekly charts ===
Chart (2017)	Peak position
Canada Rock (Billboard)	8
US Hot Rock & Alternative Songs (Billboard)	18
US Rock & Alternative Airplay (Billboard)	7

=== Year-end charts ===
Chart (2017)	Position
US Hot Rock Songs (Billboard)	43
US Rock Airplay Songs (Billboard)	14
