= Jasmine (Japanese singer) =

Japanese singer and songwriter (born 1989)

- Born: May 19, 1989 (age 37); Tokyo, Japan
- Genres: J-Pop; R&B
- Occupations: Singer; songwriter
- Instrument: Vocals
- Years active: 2009–present
- Label: Sony Music Associated
- Website: www.sonymusic.co.jp/artist/jasmine/

Jasmine (stylized as JASMINE) (born May 19, 1989), is a Japanese singer and songwriter from Tokyo. She is represented by Sony Music Japan, and is a DJ for the Japanese radio station J-Wave. In June 2009 she released her debut single "Sad to Say". Described as "the next Hikaru Utada", Jasmine cites Utada as her influence.

== Biography ==
=== Background information ===
Jasmine first experienced singing at thirteen years old, in a gospel choir at Yokota Air Base. It was here that her interest in gospel music began. Jasmine soon joined the American Expedition Choir. She decided to become a professional singer at the age of seventeen, and began writing her own lyrics and music. She soon signed a contract with Sony Music in Japan.

=== 2009–present: Debut and first album ===
Jasmine released her debut single "Sad to Say" on June 24, 2009. Previous to this date the song was released as a ringtone on the Chaku-Uta Full chart, where it debuted at number one. With this, Jasmine became the first singer to debut at number one with their debut song on the chart. Soon after the release of "Sad to Say", critics began calling Jasmine "the reincarnation of Hikaru Utada" and compared the two's choice of promoting only through radio appearances. After debuting at number thirteen on the Oricon singles chart, the single later peaked at number ten in its second week. The single has since become her most successful, peaking at number one on the digital charts and selling in excess of 30,000 physical copies in Japan.

On October 25, 2009, Jasmine had her debut live performance at the Saitama Super Arena, as a special guest for American singer Ne-Yo. Her performance coincided with the release of her second single "No More" on October 28. The song became her second top five entry on the digital charts when it debuted at the fifth position. It was also a top twenty single on the Oricon chart, debuting at number fifteen.

Jasmine returned in 2010 with set of three singles, each released within a month of each other. The first of the three, "This Is Not a Game", was released on March 3 and was limited to 10,000 copies. The song was used the opening theme for NTV's Music Fighter that month. A cover of "My Life, My Love, My All" by Kirk Franklin was featured as the single's b-side, a reference to Jasmine's gospel roots. The single debuted at twenty-three on the Oricon charts and charted for four weeks. Follow up single "Jealous" was released on April 7 and was again limited to 10,000 copies. The single featured a second gospel cover. This time it was "I Need You to Survive" by Hezekiah Walker. The single became Jasmine's third top twenty single on the Oricon chart. Jasmine's fifth single "Dreamin'" was then released on May 12. This single was produced by Jeff Miyahara, much like Jasmine's four previous A-sides, and became a top forty single on the Oricon chart.

Over a year after her debut, Jasmine's debut album, Gold, was released throughout Japan on July 21, 2010. After that, Jasmine held her first national tour JASMINE LIVE TOUR 2010〜GOLD〜 with 7 dates.

Her 6th single was released in February 2011, ONE, produced by Norgewian team Stargate. In the same year, she released the single Only One. In 2012, she released the single Best Partner. In 2013, she released the singles High Flying and HERO, changing her sound to contemporary EDM. Her second album, Complexxx followed them., containing songs from all previous singles and others new.

In 2014, Jasmine released her third studio album and her first concept album, called Welcome to Jas Vegas, and in October of the same year, she released her first best of album called Pure Love Best. From 2013 until 2017, JASMINE held her club tour Jas Vegas, until her fanclub closed.

== Discography ==
=== Albums ===
==== Studio albums ====
List of studio albums, with selected chart positions, sales figures and certifications
Title	Details	Peak chart positions			Sales	Certifications
Title	Details	JPN Oricon	JPN Hot (Note: Sources for chart positions are as follows: Re:Me)	JPN DL (Note: Sources for chart positions are as follows: Re:Me)	Sales	Certifications
Gold	Released: July 21, 2010; Label: Sony; Formats: CD, CD+DVD, digital download, streaming	3	— (Note: Gold did not enter the Billboard Japan Hot Albums Chart since the chart was established in May 2015, but peaked at number 4 on the Billboard Japan Top Album Sales Chart.)	—	JPN: 50,000	
Complexxx	Released: August 21, 2013; Label: Sony; Formats: CD, CD+DVD digital download, streaming	28	— (Note: Complexxx did not enter the Billboard Japan Hot Albums Chart since the chart was established in May 2015, but peaked at number 28 on the Billboard Japan Top Album Sales Chart.)	—	JPN: 6,000	
Welcome to Jas Vegas	Released: March 12, 2014; Label: Sony; Formats: CD, digital download, streaming	51	— (Note: Welcome to Jas Vegas did not enter the Billboard Japan Hot Albums Chart since the chart was established in May 2015, but peaked at number 46 on the Billboard Japan Top Album Sales Chart.)	—	JPN: 2,000	
Re:Me	Released: January 15, 2022; Label: Eight Entertainment; Formats: Digital download, streaming	—	96	33		

==== Compilation albums ====
List of compilation albums, with selected chart positions, sales figures and certifications
Title	Details	Peak chart positions			Sales	Certifications
Title	Details	JPN Oricon	JPN Hot	JPN DL	Sales	Certifications
Pure Love Best	Released: October 29, 2014; Label: Sony; Formats: CD, CD+DVD, digital download, streaming	35	— (Note: Pure Love Best did not enter the Billboard Japan Hot Albums Chart since the chart was established in May 2015, but peaked at number 32 on the Billboard Japan Top Album Sales Chart.)	—	JPN: 6,000	

=== Extended plays ===
List of extended plays, with selected chart positions and certifications
Title	Details	Peak chart positions		Certifications
Title	Details	JPN Hot	JPN DL (Note: Sources for chart positions are as follows: Jasmine 2.0)	Certifications
Jasmine 2.0	Released: November 25, 2019; Label: Eight Entertainment; Formats: CD, digital download, streaming	—	69	
M	Released: August 22, 2020; Label: Eight Entertainment; Formats: Digital download, streaming	—	—	
S	Released: November 6, 2020; Label: Eight Entertainment; Formats: Digital download, streaming	—	—	

=== Singles ===
==== As lead artist ====
List of singles as lead artist, with selected chart positions and certifications, showing year released and album name
Title	Year	Peak chart positions				Sales	Certifications	Album
Title	Year	JPN Oricon	JPN Hot (Note: Sources for chart positions are as follows: "Sad to Say", "No More", "This Is Not a Game", "Jealous", "Dreamin'")	JPN DL	JPN Adult (Note: Sources for chart positions are as follows: "Sad to Say", "No More", "This Is Not a Game", "Jealous", "Dreamin'")	Sales	Certifications	Album
"Sad to Say"	2009	10	6	1	17	JPN (CD): 31,200; JPN (DL): 250,000+	RIAJ: Platinum	Gold
"No More"	2009	15	8	5	2	JPN (CD): 9,200; JPN (DL): 100,000+	RIAJ: Gold	Gold
"This Is Not a Game"	2010	23	55	16	28	JPN (CD): 4,600		Gold
"Jealous"	2010	20	55	9	96	JPN (CD): 3,800		Gold
"Dreamin'"	2010	38	50	13	23	JPN (CD): 5,500; JPN (DL): 100,000	RIAJ: Gold	Gold
"One"	2011	32	38	27	23	JPN (CD): 3,600		Complexxx
"Only You"	2011	59	—	19	58	JPN (CD): 2,300		Complexxx
"Best Partner"	2012	50	41	—	35	JPN (CD): 2,200		Complexxx
"High Flying"	2013	46	50	—	41	JPN (CD): 2,200		Complexxx
"Hero"	2013	93	—	—	94	JPN (CD): 1,100		Complexxx
"Countdown"	2013	64	—	—	65	JPN (CD): 900		Pure Love Best
"Black Kitty"	2018	—	—	—	—			Jasmine 2.0
"Shut Up" (with Hollaphonic and Jazee Minor)	2019	—	—	—	—			Non-album single
"Road"	2019	—	—	—	—			Jasmine 2.0 and Re:Me
"Cocorozashi" (featuring AK-69)	2019	—	—	—	—			Jasmine 2.0 and Re:Me
"Shine" (with DJ Piger)	2019	—	—	—	—			Non-album single
"Fallin'" (featuring 5lack)	2019	—	—	—	—			Jasmine 2.0 and Re:Me
"A Whole New World"	2020	—	—	—	—			Re:Me
"Atashi no Make"	2020	—	—	—	—			M and Re:Me
"Buy Me Love" (with Sphere)	2020	—	—	—	—			Non-album single
"The Love Song"	2020	—	—	—	—			S and Re:Me
"Badass" (featuring Kira)	2021	—	—	—	—			Re:Me
"Kimi wa Tomodachi"	2021	—	—	—	—			Re:Me
"Yamaha"	2021	—	—	—	—			Re:Me

==== As featured artist ====
List of singles as featured artist, with selected chart positions and certifications, showing year released and album name
Title	Year	Peak chart positions		Sales	Certifications	Album
Title	Year	JPN Hot	JPN DL	Sales	Certifications	Album
"Skylight" (Winter for Lovers ver.) (XOX featuring Jasmine)	2017	—	—			Non-album single
"Into You" (Remix) (Young Freez featuring Jasmine)	2018	—	—			Honesty
"W.I.L.D." (OGaMixxX & SBC and Lonely Fiction featuring Jasmine)	2018	—	—			Non-album single
"Sun Goes Up" (Buzzy. featuring Jasmine and Aico)	2020	—	—			Scramble
"Back in Good" (Kenny G Kennesy featuring Jasmine)	2021	—	—			TBA

==== Promotional singles ====
List of promotional singles, with selected chart positions, showing year released and album name
Title	Year	Peak chart positions		Certifications	Album
Title	Year	JPN Hot	JPN DL	Certifications	Album
"I'll Be There"	2013	—	—		Complexxx
"#Agaru"	2014	—	—		Welcome to Jas Vegas
"I Love It"	2014	—	—		Pure Love Best
"Last Word"	2014	—	—		Pure Love Best
"Happy Dayz"	2014	—	—		Pure Love Best

== Other appearances ==
List of non-single guest appearances, with other performing artists, showing year released and album name
Title	Year	Other performer(s)	Album
"Drive"	2014	Miliyah Kato	Muse
"Soredemo Kimi ga Suki"	2014	Spicy Chocolate, Kotobuki kun and Sky-Hi	Shibuya Junai Monogatari
"No-ID"	2015	Spyair	4
"Sakura"	2015	Spicy Chocolate and Kira	Shibuya Junai Monogatari 2
"Back Forth Sideways" (Remix)	2020	Joe Iron	Asiatic
"Time"	2021	Rayy Stackz	Bonnie Parker
