= Golden River =

Golden River may refer to:

== Rivers ==
- Golden River (Anchuhu), a former Jurchen name for the Ashi River, China
- Golden River or Golden Water River, in the outer court of the Forbidden City, Beijing, China
- Golden River (Ah-ur-tan), a former Mongolian name for the Yellow River, China
- Do Ouro River (disambiguation) or Golden River, several rivers in Brazil
- Douro, nicknamed Golden River, in Spain and Portugal
- Mas River, East Java, Indonesia
- Zarrineh River, Iran

== Culture ==
- The Golden River (album), 2003 album by Frog Eyes
- "The Golden River" (comics), 1957 comic book story
- The Golden River, a children's game also known as May I Cross Your Golden River
- The King of the Golden River, 1841 book by John Ruskin
- Three Golden Rivers, 1948 young-adult novel by Olive Price

== Other uses ==
- Golden Rivers Football League, Australia

== See also ==
- Gold River (disambiguation)
