= &Run =

Single by Sir Sly

from the album Don't You Worry, Honey
- Released: June 30, 2017
- Genre: Alternative rock; indie pop; synthpop
- Length: 3:52
- Label: Interscope
- Songwriters: Hayden Coplen; Landon Jacobs; Jason Suwito
- Producer: Tiffany Suh

Sir Sly singles chronology
"Astronaut" (2017)	"&Run" (2017)	"Change" (2018)

Music video
- "&Run" on YouTube

"&Run" (pronounced "and run") is the seventh single by American indie pop band, Sir Sly. The song was released as the fourth single from the band's second album, Don't You Worry, Honey, on June 30, 2017, via a YouTube video through Interscope Records. The song was featured on the soundtrack to FIFA 18.

== Music video ==
The music video for the track was released on December 7, 2017. The video features the band going through daily life preparing for the shooting of a music video, and examining sights for the video.

== Track listing ==
All tracks are written by Hayden Coplen, Landon Jacobs, and Jason Suwito.

No.	Title	Length
1.	"&Run"	3:52
Total length:		3:52

== Charts ==
=== Weekly charts ===
Chart (2018)	Peak position
Canada Rock (Billboard)	27
US Hot Rock & Alternative Songs (Billboard)	17
US Rock & Alternative Airplay (Billboard)	6

=== Year-end charts ===
Chart (2018)	Position
US Alternative Songs (Billboard)	13
US Hot Rock Songs (Billboard)	36
US Rock Airplay Songs (Billboard)	20
