= Redshift (group) =

British electronic music group

Redshift is a British electronic music group, founded in 1996 by Mark Shreeve. Their musical style is rooted in the early to mid 1970s German electronic music era, often described as Berlin School, and transcends the genre using musical originality, multi-instrumentation, and complex harmonic arrangements using analogue sequencing. Their pieces are described as both exciting and haunting in equal measure, expressing strong central themes, and include contrasting atmospheres of rich sonic textures. Redshift music has been played on BBC TV and some listeners have likened certain pieces to film score, neo-industrial, as well as dark ambient. Listeners have commented on the hypnotic quality of the musical compositions.

Their sound is largely dependent upon older synthesiser technology, notably instruments such as the Moog 3C which they combine with more recent digital technology. The basic technological philosophy of Redshift is to use analogue synthesis where possible, augmented where necessary by digitally sampled versions of hard-to-maintain analogue instruments such as the Mellotron. Redshift use analogue instruments manufactured by Moog, Yamaha, Oberheim, Korg, Roland, PPG, Analogue Systems, Doepfer, Modcan, Solina, and Fender Rhodes.

== Line up ==
The band consists of Mark Shreeve, Julian Shreeve and James Goddard. Rob Jenkins was a band member from its inception in 1996 but left the band in 2002 after the Hampshire Jam 2 concert. James Goddard has been unable to perform as part of Redshift due to other commitments overseas since 2006, and Ian Boddy, long time peer of Mark Shreeve, has temporarily supported Mark and Julian Shreeve in performing 2006, 2008 and 2010 Redshift concerts in James’s absence.

== Discography ==
=== Studio and live albums ===
- Redshift (1996, studio album; remastered 2006)
- Ether (1998, live and studio album; remastered 2007)
- Down Time (1999, studio album; remastered 2007)
- Siren (2002, live album; remastered with additional track 2007)
- Halo (2002, studio album; remastered 2007)
- Wild (2002, live and studio album)
- Faultline (2004, live album)
- Oblivion (2004, studio album; remastered 2007)
- Toll (2006, live album)
- Wild 2 (2006, studio album)
- Last (2007, live album)
- Turning Towards Us (2008, studio album)
- Wild 3 (2009, live and studio album)
- Colder (2011, live album)
- Life to Come (2015, studio album)

=== Compilation and rare tracks ===
- Echo Flow – Echoes Living Room Concerts Volume 9 (2003)
- Midnight Clear Minus Five (2004)
- Missing Scene (exclusive track given away as a prize at the E-Live Festival, 2004)
- Crystalline 94 – To The Sky and Beyond the Stars: A Tribute to Michael Garrison (2005)

=== Videos ===
- Faultline – Hampshire Jam 2 Festival, United Kingdom (2004)

Redshift is known for high production quality both in terms of sonic choices and recorded audio quality in album releases (and sonic quality of live performances). The quality is largely due to the technical expertise and influence of Mark Shreeve who enjoyed a successful commercial recording contract as a recording artist in the 1980s with Jive Records (Jive Electro) where he learned contemporary recording/production techniques from studio experts in Battery Studios, UK.

== Concerts ==
Redshift live performances are rare due to the expense and logistics involved in taking older analogue gear on the road. Up to 2012, Redshift had performed a total of seven live concerts, each time as the headline act, and with all of those performances subsequently being released as live albums.

- Jodrell Bank Planetarium, United Kingdom (7 December 1996)
- Alfa Centarui Festival, Netherlands (10 April 1999)
- Hampshire Jam 2 Festival, United Kingdom (9 November 2002)
- E-Live Festival, Eindhoven, Netherlands (9 October 2004)
- Hampshire Jam 5 Festival, United Kingdom (21 October 2006)
- Hampshire Jam 7 Festival, United Kingdom (15 November 2008)
- Hampshire Jam 9 Festival, United Kingdom (13 November 2010)

Music performances are carefully prepared for by the band whilst still allowing scope for skilled improvisation, e.g. fans attending their inaugural concert in Jodrell Bank Observatory in 1996 were treated to a completely improvised piece post-encore – a piece none of the band had discussed or considered beforehand.

== Associated bands ==
Mark Shreeve and Ian Boddy are also known for their joint project ARC.
