= Gold (Sir Sly EP) =

EP by Sir Sly
- Released: May 21, 2013
- Recorded: 2012–2013
- Genre: Indie pop
- Length: 14:25
- Label: Interscope

Sir Sly chronology
Gold (2013)	You Haunt Me (2014)

Gold is the debut extended play by Los Angeles–based indie pop band, Sir Sly. It was released through Interscope Records on May 21, 2013.

== Track listing ==
1. "Where I'm Going" – 3:19
2. "Gold" – 3:51
3. "Found You Out" – 3:37
4. "Ghost" – 3:38

Professional ratings
Review scores
Source	Rating
Apes On Tape	Positive
