= The Gold Diggers (Aleichem play) =

Di goldgreber (The Gold Diggers) is a play by Sholem Aleichem, in the tradition of Yiddish theatre. Originally called The Treasure in its earlier incarnation, Aleichem changed the title after another play appeared with the same name. The subject is a comedy of shtetl life thrown into chaos by rumours of Napoleonic gold having been buried in a Jewish cemetery. The Polish State Jewish Theatre revived the play, using the original title The Treasure, in 1949.
