= Gold River =

Gold River may refer to:

== Canada ==
- Gold River, British Columbia
  - Gold River Water Aerodrome, an airport
- Gold River, Nova Scotia, a community in the Chester Municipal District
- Gold River 21, a Mi'kmaq reserve, Lunenburg County, Nova Scotia

== Other places ==
- Ashi River, formerly known as the Anchuhu or Gold River, China
- Do Ouro River (disambiguation)
- Gold River, California, United States
- Gold River Gambling Hall & Resort, now named Laughlin River Lodge, Laughlin, Nevada, United States

== Other uses ==
- Gold River (horse), French Thoroughbred racehorse
- "Gold River", a song by Parannoul on Sky Hundred, 2024

== See also ==
- Golden River (disambiguation)
