= Navy Blue and Gold =

Alma mater of the United States Naval Academy

"Navy Blue and Gold" is the alma mater of the United States Naval Academy. It is traditionally sung at the end of gatherings of midshipmen and alumni, including Naval Academy pep rallies and sporting events at which a band is present.

== History ==
- Written in 1923 by Commander Roy de Saussure Horn (USNA Class of 1915), with music composed by J. W. Crosley.
- Changed to gender-neutral lyrics in May 2004 by Vice Admiral Rodney P. Rempt.
