= Gold (Jasmine album) =

Studio album by JASMINE
- Released: July 21, 2010
- Recorded: 2009–2010; Los Angeles, CA
- Genre: J-pop, R&B
- Length: 51:14
- Label: Sony Music Associated
- Producer: JASMINE, Jeff Miyahara, BACHLOGIC

Singles from Gold
- 1. "Sad to Say" Released: June 24, 2009; 2. "No More" Released: October 28, 2009; 3. "This is Not a Game" Released: March 3, 2010; 4. "Jealous" Released: April 7, 2010; 5. "Dreamin'" Released: May 12, 2010

Professional ratings
Review scores
Source	Rating
CD journal	Positive
hotexpress	Positive
Listen Japan	Positive

Gold is the first studio album by the Japanese singer Jasmine, released in two formats, standard and limited, on July 21, 2010, by Sony Music Associated. The limited edition (a digipak) includes a bonus DVD.

== Track listing ==
From Natalie.mu

CD
No.	Title	Writer(s)	Arranger(s)	Length
1.	"Pride"	Jasmine, K/		2:24
2.	"sad to say"	Jasmine, Jeff Miyahara	Jeff Miyahara, Atsushi	4:01
3.	"L.I.P.S."	Jasmine, Jeff Miyahara		3:37
4.	"Jealous"	Jasmine, Jeff Miyahara Jeremy Soule		3:31
5.	"Bad Girl."	Jasmine, Bachlogic		4:15
6.	"dear my friend"	Jasmine, Jeff Miyahara, yellowRubato		4:38
7.	"stage ~interlude~"	Jeff Miyahara		1:00
8.	"This Is Not A Game"	Jasmine, Jeff Miyahara	Jasmine	3:32
9.	"Clubbin'"	Jasmine, Ricky	Manaboon	4:13
10.	"Koi (恋, Love)"	Jasmine, Satomi Kawasaki	Satomi Kawasaki	3:42
11.	"what you want?"	Jasmine, Jeff Miyahara		3:24
12.	"No More"	Jasmine, Jeff Miyahara, daido	Jeff Miyahara	4:04
13.	"Dreamin'"	Jasmine, Jeff Miyahara, Jeremy Soule		4:05
14.	"Why"	Jasmine, Red-T		4:48

DVD (first press edition only)
No.	Title	Director(s)	Length
1.	"sad to say" (music video)	Noriyuki Tanaka
2.	"No More" (music video)	Noriyuki Tanaka
3.	"This Is Not A Game" (music video)	Noriyuki Tanaka
4.	"Jealous" (music video)	Noriyuki Tanaka
5.	"Dreamin'" (music video)	Noriyuki Tanaka

== Singles ==
Release	Title	Notes	Chart positions		
Release	Title	Notes	Oricon singles charts	Billboard Japan Hot 100	RIAJ digital tracks
2009	"Sad to Say"	Certified platinum for full-length cellphone downloads	10	6	1
2009	"No More"	Certified gold for full-length cellphone downloads	15	8	5
2010	"This is Not a Game"	Limited production run of 10,000 copies	23	55	16
2010	"Jealous"	Limited production run of 10,000 copies	20	55	9
2010	"Dreamin'"		38	50	13

== Charts ==
Classifica	Posizione raggiunta
Japan (Oricon Daily Charts)	2
Japan (Oricon Weekly Charts)	3
Japan (Billboard Japan Top Albums)	4
World Albums Top 40	32

== Release history ==
Country	Date	Format	Label
Japan	July 21, 2010	CD, CD+DVD	Sony
Hong Kong	March 9, 2012	CD+DVD	Sony
