= Mark Shreeve =

British composer (1957–2022)

- Born: 2 June 1957; Great Yarmouth, England
- Died: 31 August 2022 (aged 65)
- Genres: Electronic
- Occupation: Composer
- Member of: Redshift

Mark Shreeve (2 June 1957 – 31 August 2022) was a British electronic music composer. After initially releasing his early work on cassette through the label Mirage Records, he went on to sign for the newly formed Jive Electro in the early 1980s, and released the albums Assassin, Legion, and Crash Head. His last solo album to date, Nocturne, was released in 1995. A live album, Collide, was released in 1996 featuring his live performance at EMMA two years before.

Shreeve was born in Great Yarmouth on 2 June 1957.

Shreeve also composed scores or sections of scores for some feature films, recorded a number of library music CDs and wrote the song "Touch Me (I Want Your Body)" for Samantha Fox, which was released and hit the chart in 1986. He also worked briefly with Christopher Franke of Tangerine Dream and has had some technical association with producer and modular synthesiser expert Ed Buller.

In 1996, Shreeve formed the group Redshift with his brother Julian, James Goddard and Rob Jenkins. The group has recorded nine albums to date and played live in the UK and in all Europe, including one concert made at Jodrell Bank Observatory.

Shreeve died on 31 August 2022, at the age of 65.

== Selected solo discography ==
- Embryo (1980)
- Ursa Major (1980)
- Thoughts Of War (1981)
- Fire Music (1981)
- Phantom (1981)
- Assassin (1984)
- Legion (1985)
- Oracle (1986)
- Crash Head (1988)
- Riding the Edge (1989)
- Energy Fountain (1990)
- Powerhouse (1991)
- Pulsar (1991)
- Nocturne (1995)
- Collide (Live at EMMA) (1996)
