= List of rivers of São Tomé and Príncipe =

This is a list of rivers in São Tomé and Príncipe. This list is arranged by drainage basin, with respective tributaries indented under each larger stream's name.

== São Tomé ==
Listed clockwise, starting at the north end of the island.

- Rio do Ouro
- Rio Sebastião
- Rio Melo
- Rio Água Grande
- Rio Manuel Jorge
- Rio Abade
  - Rio Bomba
- Ribeira Afonso
- Rio Angobó
- Rio Ió Grande
  - Rio Umbugo
  - Rio Miranda Guedes
  - Rio Ana de Chaves
  - Rio Campos
- Rio Martim Mendes
- Rio Cáué
- Rio Gumbela
- Rio Portinho
- Rio das Pedras
- Rio Massacavu
- Rio Quija
- Rio Xufexufe
  - Rio Morango
- Rio Edgar
- Rio Lembá
  - Rio Lembá Pequeno
  - Rio Cabumbê
- Rio Cantador
- Rio Paga Fogo
- Rio Maria Luisa
- Rio Contador
- Rio Provaz
- Água Castelo

== Príncipe ==
- Rio Papagaio
- Rio Bibi
- Rio Banzú
