= Black Gold (Jimi Hendrix recordings) =

1970 autobiographical song cycle by Jimi Hendrix

Black Gold is an unreleased song cycle by Jimi Hendrix, recorded shortly before his death in 1970. Some consider Black Gold to be the "holy grail" of Hendrix collectibles. The themed songs, plus the label markings and conventions used by Hendrix to identify the tapes, led fans to believe that this demo represents a proposed fifth studio album, and predicted that the material will reveal the broadest extensions of Hendrix's intended musical direction. The tapes are currently in the possession of Hendrix's step-sister Janie.

== History ==
In early 1970, Hendrix recorded an autobiographical song cycle in his Greenwich Village apartment that he titled Black Gold. Months later, at the Isle of Wight Festival, Hendrix gave tapes to his drummer Mitch Mitchell to have him listen and comment on the necessary rhythm section requirements for recording the songs. After Hendrix's death in September 1970, Mitchell simply forgot about the tapes, apparently unaware that they were one-of-a-kind masters. For 22 years, the Black Gold tapes sat in a black Ampex tape box that Hendrix tied shut with a headband and labelled "BG".

Hendrix's producer Alan Douglas discussed another tape in his possession in a 1974 interview. The tape included "eight tunes, running for about 30 minutes". He described it briefly: "the quality might be OK for us to put it out in audio form, but it is such an incredible story that I'm thinking along the lines of an animated film". At the time of the interview Mitchell's tapes were as-yet undiscovered, so Douglas' single cassette was presumably a different item.

It was not until 1992 that Tony Brown, the avid Hendrix collector and biographer, interviewed Mitchell and learnt that the mythical Black Gold tapes, thought to have been stolen from Hendrix's apartment by vandals who ransacked it for collectibles soon after his death, were lying in Mitchell's home in England. Mitchell also possessed the Martin guitar that was used to create the material. Brown was invited to review the tapes and published a summary of his account, though not the tracks themselves.

Mitchell was in possession of the tapes at the time of his death in 2008, leaving the whereabouts of the Black Gold tapes uncertain. In March 2010, Janie Hendrix was described as being a "custodian of a vast stash of unreleased material", and stated that Black Gold will be released "this decade", though that did not eventuate. "Suddenly November Morning" was included in the album West Coast Seattle Boy: The Jimi Hendrix Anthology, released in November 2010. The first track on the Black Gold suite, it was released as the last track on the album. This is the only track from Black Gold ever released. Douglas died in 2014, and the status of his copy is unknown.

== Contents ==
Mitchell's tapes consisted of 16 songs, all created by a solo Hendrix armed only with his voice and a Martin acoustic guitar. Near the end of the collection lies an embryonic two-part rendition of his superhero themed funk-rock tune "Astro Man", in which Hendrix sings lines from the 1950s Mighty Mouse cartoon theme and makes humorous references to Superman. Other songs from the Black Gold sessions were also further developed in the studio and have surfaced in the Hendrix catalogue ("Stepping Stone", "Machine Gun", and "Drifting"), but at least nine of the songs are known to be unique to the tapes. Eric Burdon recalled a conversation with Hendrix at the time, describing it as: "an autobiographical, multi-song fantasy piece he had been working on. Jimi intended it to accompany an animated feature about a black rock star—himself on the road... forty minutes of fresh new material that clearly demonstrated the direction Jimi was headed in. He talked excitedly about the cartoon character he'd envisioned. I know he did at least some work on the suite before he died."

== Unrelated bootleg ==
There is a 1996 bootleg release called "Black Gold" but that is a collection of Electric Ladyland outtakes and rehearsals, and does not include the Greenwich Village material.

== Tentative track listing ==
There is little to go by regarding the actual names of the tracks on Black Gold. On the only recorded source Jimi had written "Idea for L.P. side 1 suite ... Black Gold" on side A. On the B side of the cassette the only writing was "cont from side A". Some of the tracks have been released on other albums, such as the tracks "Machine Gun" and "Drifting", found on Band of Gypsys and First Rays of the New Rising Sun, respectively. These are based on Mitchell's tapes rather than the single cassette Douglas referred to.

=== Side A ===
1. "Suddenly November Morning"
2. "Drifting"
3. "Captain Midnight"
4. "Local Commotion"
5. "Here Comes Black Gold"
6. "Stepping Stone"
7. "Little Red Velvet Room"

=== Side B ===
1. "The Jungle Is Waiting"
2. "Send My Love to Joan of Arc"
3. "God Bless This Day"
4. "Black Gold"
5. "Machine Gun"
6. "Here Comes Black Gold"
7. "Astro Man (Parts 1 & 2)"
8. "I've Got a Place to Go"

== Works cited ==
- Roby, Steven (2002). Black Gold: The Lost Archives of Jimi Hendrix. Billboard Books. ISBN 0-8230-7854-X.
