= Goldmine =

Goldmine may refer to:

- A location where gold mining takes place
- Goldmine (magazine), a music collectibles magazine
- Goldmine (album), by Gabby Barrett, 2020
- "Goldmine" (George Fox song), 1989
- "Goldmine" (Kimbra song), 2015
- Goldmine, a 2007 album by Silvía Night

== See also ==
- Gold Mine (disambiguation)
- Gold farming, acquiring virtual currency in online games to be sold to other players for real money
