= Gggolddd =

Dutch rock band

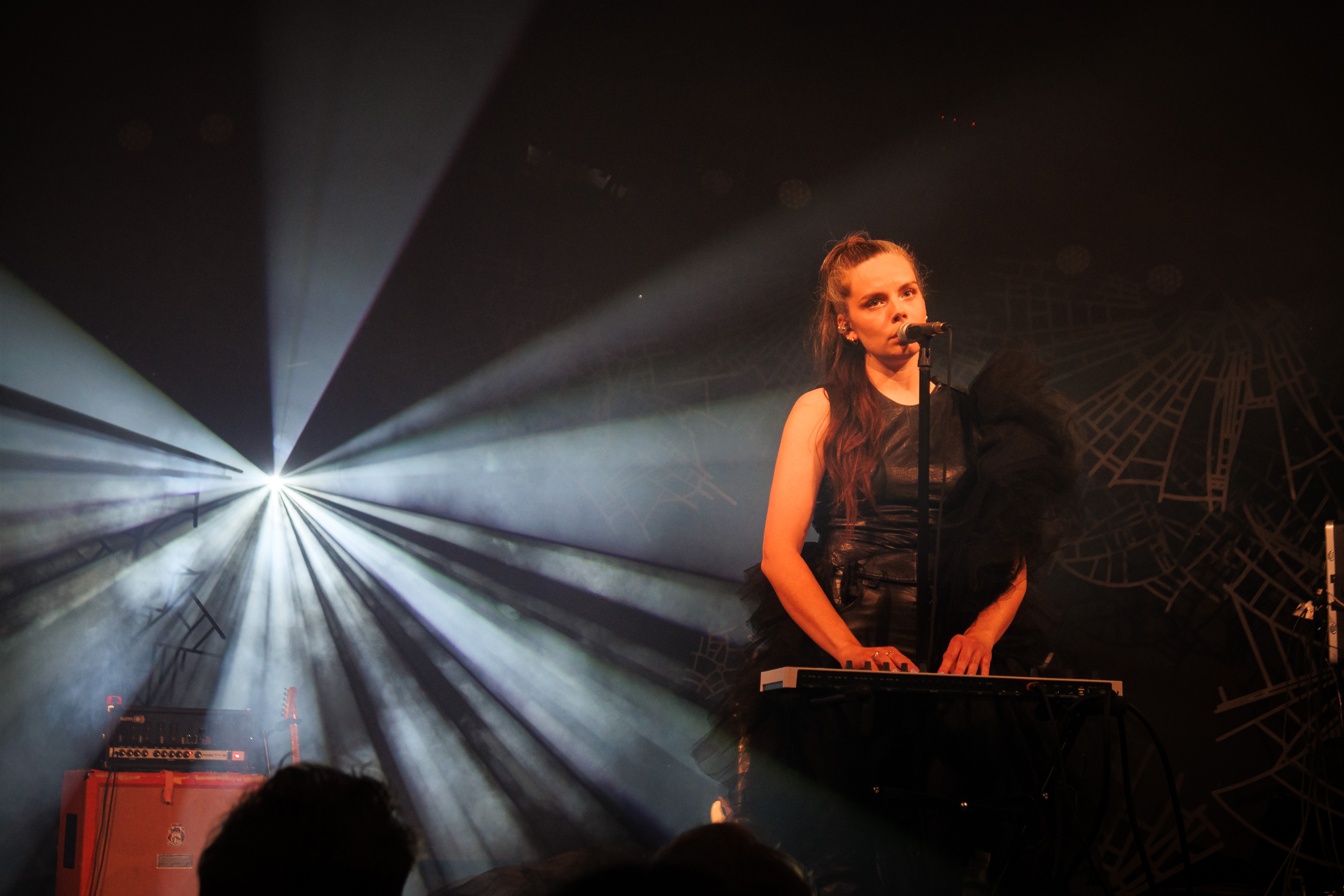
- Milena Eva of Gggolddd in 2022

Background information
- Origin: Rotterdam, the Netherlands
- Genres: Alternative pop; dark rock; experimental; post-punk
- Years active: 2011–present
- Labels: Ván Records; Profound Lore Records; Artoffact Records
- Members: Milena Eva; Thomas Sciarone; Jaka Bolič; Vincent Shore
- Past members: Igor Wouters; Nick Polak; Kamiel Top; Harm Haverman; Tim Meijer; Leyla Overdulve
- Website: gggolddd.com

Gggolddd (stylised in all caps) is a Dutch musical project by Milena Eva and Thomas Sciarone. Based in Rotterdam, Netherlands, the couple founded the band in 2011, after Sciarone's departure from the Devil's Blood. The band changed their name from Gold (stylised in all caps) to Gggolddd in 2020. The band is known for blending many styles and influences into their sound, including rock, post-punk, post-metal, black metal, electronic and trip hop.

The band has toured extensively through Europe, sharing the stage with artists such as New Model Army, Amenra, Converge, Mono, Cult Of Luna, Boris, Alcest and Sólstafir. They have performed at festivals such as Hellfest, Roadburn, Eurosonic, ArcTanGent, Motocultor, Fusion Fest, Wave-Gotik-Treffen and Devilstone.

== History ==
Milena Eva and Thomas Sciarone were already a couple when they founded the band in 2011. After Sciarone left the Devil's Blood they put a line-up together, with drummer Igor Wouters (known for playing with hardcore punk bands like Backfire!, Born From Pain, Madball), bass player Harm Haverman (previously of Reaching Forward, Razor Crusade and Modern Life Is War) and guitarist Nick Polak. they recorded and released the debut album Interbellum in 2012 through Ván Records.

With new bass player Tim Meijer (known for Tenement Kids), they recorded their second album No Image with producer Jeff Zeigler. The album was released in 2015 by Ván Records, and by Profound Lore Records in North America. The album saw the band drastically change their sound, into a rawer, more modern one, with post-punk rhythms and layers of black metal-style tremolo picking guitars, while also embracing more experimental music, "noisy loud" indie-rock, and dark and deathrock. In order to perform these guitar parts, the band added a third guitarist, Kamiel Top, to their line-up. In 2016, Jaka Bolič replaced guitarist Polak, who had left to join Dool.

This line-up continued to record and release the albums Optimist (2017) and Why Aren't You Laughing? (2019). Ahead of the release of Why Aren't You Laughing?, bass player Tim Meijer left the band and was replaced by Leyla Overdulve. The band premiered "Why Aren't You Laughing?" at the 2019 edition of Roadburn Festival.

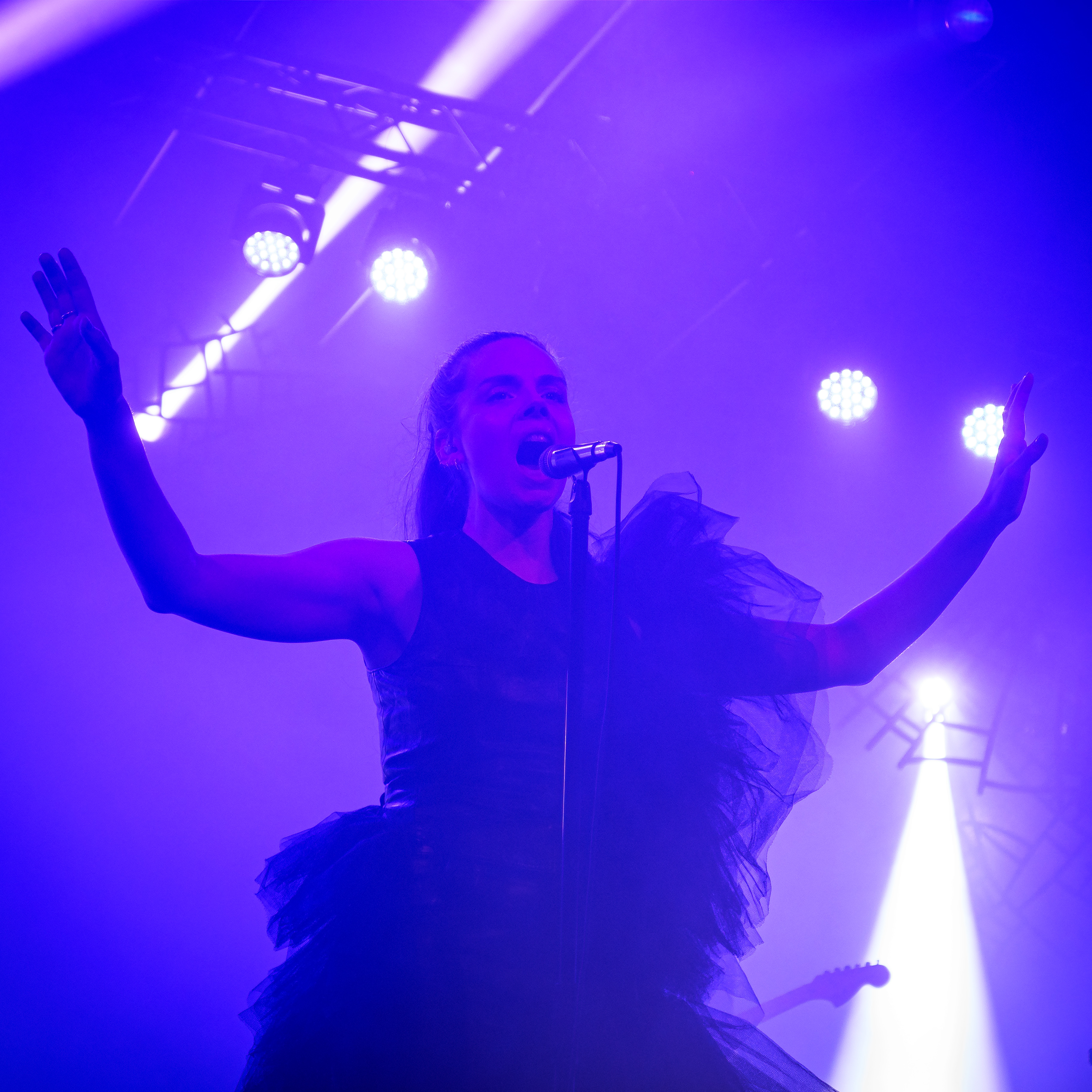
Gggolddd performing in July 2022

During the COVID-19 pandemic, guitarist Top and bassist Overdulve left the band and were replaced by Vincent Shore on guitar and Danielle Warners on bass. Eva and Sciarone were commissioned by Roadburn Festival to write a piece for the 2021 event. The band premiered the resulting piece, "This Shame Should Not Be Mine", through a live-streamed edition of the festival called Roadburn Redux. "This Shame Should Not Be Mine" deals with Eva's personal experience with sexual assault, and sees the band shifting to a more electronic sound, incorporating synthesisers, samples and electronic beats.

The band recorded This Shame Should Not Be Mine as a full-length album in Orgone Studios with Jaime Gomez Arellano. The album was released on April 1 of 2022. The band presented the album at Roadburn Festival 2022 with live strings. Eva and Sciarone also curated part of the Roadburn line-up that year, inviting artists including Divide And Dissolve, Amnesia Scanner, Liturgy, Wiegedood and Backxwash.

During 2023, Gggolddd did two European tours as a four-piece consisting of Eva, Sciarone, Shore and Bolič. With this line-up, the band recorded and released an EP called PTSD, with three new songs and two electronic re-recordings of the songs "He Is Not" and "Old Habits".

In March 2024, the band announced that Sciarone was suffering from symptoms associated with long COVID, with no signs of improvement, and was focusing on his recovery before resuming live performances. All scheduled dates had been cancelled.

== Musical style ==
Gggolddd has been described as alternative pop, dark rock, alternative rock, experimental, and post-punk. Eli Enis of Revolver described the band's style as "shifting between sounds that range from dirt-kickin' rock to dirgy post-metal". François Gorin of Télérama wrote that the band's music is "dark, with gothic accents and sometimes violents".

This Shame Should Not Be Mine features minimalist electronic sounds with influences ranging from post-rock to trip hop.

== Band members ==
=== Current ===
- Milena Eva – lead vocals (co-founder)
- Thomas Sciarone – guitar, synthesisers (co-founder)
- Jaka Bolič – guitar, samples
- Vincent Shore – guitar, samples

=== Former ===
- Igor Wouters – drums
- Nick Polak – guitar
- Kamiel Top – guitar
- Harm Haverman – bass
- Tim Meijer – bass
- Leyla Overdulve – bass

== Discography ==
=== Studio albums ===
Title	Release details
Interbellum	Released: December 7, 2012; Label: Ván Records
No Image	Released: October 13, 2015; Label: Ván Records, Profound Lore Records
Optimist	Released: February 24, 2017; Label: Ván Records
Why Aren't You Laughing?	Released: April 5, 2019; Label: Artoffact Records
This Shame Should Not Be Mine	Released: April 1, 2022; Label: Artoffact Records

=== Extended plays ===
Title	Release details
Gone Under/Medicine Man	Released: March 31, 2012; Label: Ván Records
Faces I Don't Recall – The Optimist Remixes	Released: January 31, 2018; Label: Oaken Palace Records
The Bedroom Sessions	Released: June 5, 2020; Label: self-released
PTSD	Released: October 13, 2023; Label: self-released, Artoffact Records

=== Live albums ===
Title	Album details
The Isolation Sessions	Released: May 1, 2020; Label: self-released
Live at Roadburn Redux	Released: April 1, 2022; Label: self-released, Artoffact Records

=== Compilations ===
Title	Album details
The Archive Sessions	Released: July 3, 2020; Label: self-released
Recession	Released: October 12, 2020; Label: self-released
