= Blue Gold (disambiguation) =

Blue Gold is a novel by Clive Cussler and Paul Kemprecos published in 2000.

Blue Gold or Blue gold may also refer to:

- Blue Gold: The Right to Stop the Corporate Theft of the World's Water, a book by Maude Barlow and Tony Clarke
  - Blue Gold: World Water Wars, a 2008 documentary based on the book
- Blue gold, a type of colored gold

== See also ==
- Gold (disambiguation)
- Water politics
- Cobalt
