= Gold (short story) =

1991 short story by American writer Isaac Asimov

"Gold" was originally published in the September 1991 issue of Analog

"Gold" is a short story by American writer Isaac Asimov. It originally appeared in the September 1991 issue of Analog Science Fiction and Fact, and was collected in the eponymous volume Gold. One of the last short stories he wrote, it won a Hugo Award for best Novelette in 1992.

== Plot summary ==
The story describes the efforts of fictional computer animators to create a "compu-drama" from the second section of Asimov's novel The Gods Themselves, which occurs in a parallel universe with different laws of physics to that within which Earth is situated, amongst a trigendered species of energy-based beings and one triad of narrative protagonists in particular. The story attributes this middle portion to an author named Gregory Laborian, saying it is a stand-alone novel entitled Three in One. Laborian convinces director Jonas Willard, who had won fame for a CGI version of King Lear, to create an animated version of Laborian's story. Laborian says Willard's "Three in One" was better work than his "King Lear" because he only had "my words which aren't great" instead of Shakespeare as a starting point.
