= Black and Gold (book) =

1987 book by Anthony Sampson

- Author: Anthony Sampson
- Language: English
- Subject: Politics
- Genre: Non-fiction
- Publisher: Pantheon
- Publication date: 1987
- Publication place: United Kingdom

Black and Gold: Tycoons, Revolutionaries, and Apartheid is a 1987 book by English journalist Anthony Sampson which deals with the relationship between international big business and Black political movements in South Africa, weaving together the themes of apartheid and gold mining. Black and Gold includes an account of foreign finance behind the "Apartheid Boom."
