= Pleasureman =

Studio album by Günther
- Released: 30 August 2004
- Genre: Swedish pop, Eurodance, parody
- Length: 41:45
- Label: Warner Bros.

Singles from Pleasureman
- 1. "Ding Dong Song" Released: 2004; 2. "Teeny Weeny String Bikini" Released: 2004; 3. "Touch Me" Released: 2004

Professional ratings
Review scores
Source	Rating
AllMusic	4/5 stars

Pleasureman is the only studio album by the Swedish singer Günther. The album was originally released in Sweden in 2004, and an uncensored American version was released by Warner Bros. Records in 2006. In 2007, the album was released in Japan.

== Track listing ==
Original Swedish release
No.	Title	Length
1.	"Golddiggers"	3:36
2.	"Ding Dong Song"	4:04
3.	"Teeny Weeny String Bikini"	4:00
4.	"Touch Me"	3:29
5.	"Pleasureman"	3:24
6.	"Crazy & Wild"	4:17
7.	"One Night Stand"	3:37
8.	"I'm Your Man (G.U.N.T.H.E.R)"	3:08
9.	"Naughty Boy"	3:30
10.	"Enormous Emotion (I Love You)"	4:08
11.	"Ding Dong Song" (Soft Core Version)	4:23
Total length:		41:45

US release
No.	Title	Length
1.	"Ding Dong Song"	4:04
2.	"Golddiggers"	3:35
3.	"Teeny Weeny String Bikini"	4:00
4.	"Touch Me"	3:38
5.	"Tuttifrutti Summerlove"	3:46
6.	"Pleasureman"	3:24
7.	"Crazy & Wild"	4:17
8.	"One Night Stand"	3:37
9.	"I'm Your Man (G.U.N.T.H.E.R.)"	3:08
10.	"Naughty Boy"	3:30
11.	"Enormous Emotion (I Love You)"	4:08
12.	"Like Fire Tonight"	3:00
Total length:		44:07

== Charts ==
Chart	Peak position
Finnish Albums (Suomen virallinen lista)	12
Swedish Albums (Sverigetopplistan)	6
