= Wonky pop =

Music style

- Stylistic origins: Synth-pop; dance-punk; post-punk revival
- Cultural origins: Mid-2000s, Europe
- Typical instruments: Electric guitar; keyboard; synthesizer; bass; programming; drums; vocals

Other topics
- Alternative dance; dance-pop; dance-rock

Wonky pop was a loose grouping of musical acts that played what the BBC called "quirky, catchy and credible pop", rooted in the eccentric side of 1980s pop music, which was briefly popular in the late 2000s. Artists associated with the genre include Mika, Alphabeat and Frankmusik.

== Definitions ==
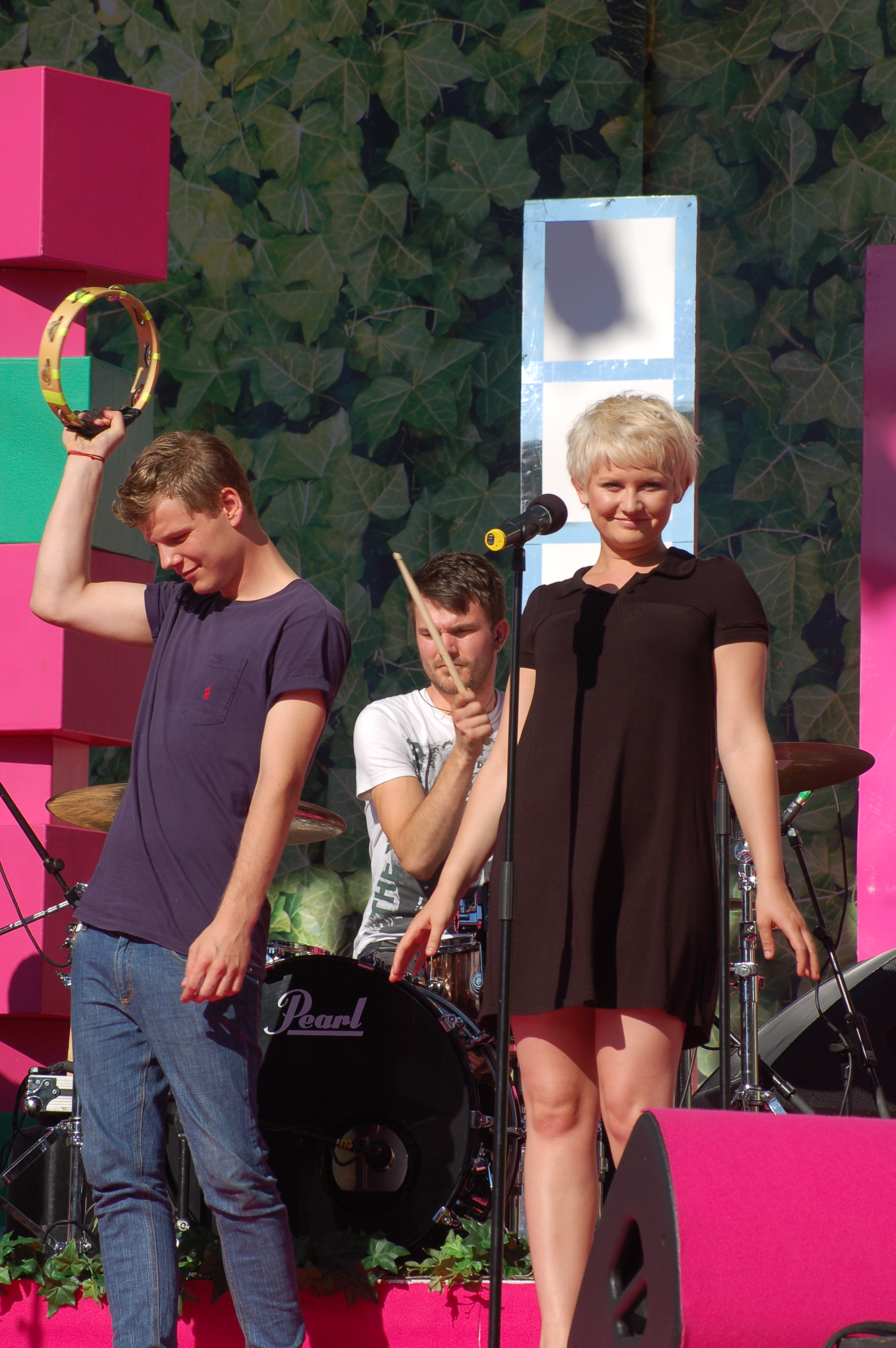
Alphabeat are a wonky pop band.

"Wonky" is a British English word meaning "unsteady, shaky, awry, or wrong." The BBC reported that the term "wonky pop" was both coined by and is owned by Mika's manager, while The Independent reported the term was coined by Peter Robinson, founder of the blog Popjustice.

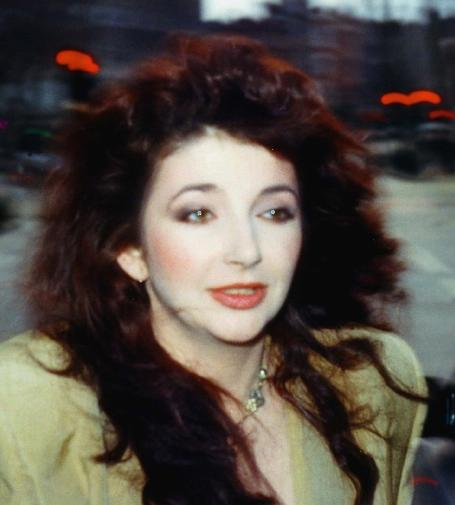
Kate Bush, pictured here in 1986, is cited as one of the major influences on wonky pop.

The BBC describes a UK wonky-pop club night as involving "cutting-edge pop, dance, hip hop and everything in between"; club organiser René Symonds states that "the iPod shuffle generation will not be limited to one genre and wants a return to authenticity after years of manufactured pop". The wonky pop website sets out a manifesto that states, "We want to show the world that pop is not a four letter word, and for every flaky reality TV winner there's a myriad of cool, credible and weird acts."

== Style ==
A May 2008 article by The Guardian contrasted wonky pop performers with mainstream pop performers, noting that "Wonky Pop artists are unmanufactured but unashamedly melodic and capable of playing live without recourse to lashings of dry ice, troupes of dancers and an interlude during which they fly around the stage on wires." The Independent stated that wonky pop caused a change in "pop's division of labour ... away from focus-grouped, production-line pop, and towards DIY [and] ... fresh flavours", which is rejuvenating pop in the 2000s in the way that Britpop gave a shot in the arm to pop in the 1990s. Major influences cited for wonky pop acts include David Bowie, Kate Bush, Kylie Minogue, Prince and Madonna. Wonky pop was credited with causing a shift in popular musical tastes from male-driven guitar acts to female-driven 1980s-style pop music seen in the synthpop revival of the later 2000s.

== See also ==
- Post-punk revival
- New wave
- Synthwave
