= Gold Medallion =

Gold Medallion may refer to:

- Gold medallion tree, a tropical tree from Brazil with yellow flowers, scientifically named Cassia leptophylla
- Gold Retirement Medallion of the U.S. Central Intelligence Agency
- Gold Medallion Book Award, former name of the Christian Book Award, given by the Evangelical Christian Publishers Association
- Sternberg Interfaith Gold Medallion, UK award for interfaith understanding
- Melampodium divaricatum, a flowering plant in the family Asteraceae, commonly known as gold medallion

== See also ==
- Gold (disambiguation)
- Medallion (disambiguation)
- Bronze Medallion (disambiguation)
- Silver Medallion (disambiguation)
- Gold medal
