= Silver Award =

Silver Award may refer to:

Several organizations issue awards with this name:

- The Silver Award (Girl Scouts of the USA)
- The Silver Award (Venturing) of the Venturing program of the Boy Scouts of America
- The Silver World Award of the Boy Scouts of America
- A level of The Duke of Edinburgh's Award

== See also ==
- Silver (disambiguation)
- Award (disambiguation)
- Silver medal
- Silver Star (disambiguation)
- Bronze Award (disambiguation)
- Gold Award (disambiguation)
