= Gold medal (disambiguation) =

Gold medals are the highest medal awarded for highest achievement in many fields.

Gold medal also may refer to:

- Gold medal awards, list of medals called "Gold Medal"
  - Gold Medal (National Eisteddfod of Wales)
- The Gold Medal (film), 1969 Indian Bollywood spy film
- Gold Medal (album), a music album by American rock band The Donnas
- The Gold Medal Collection, 2-CD Harry Chapin music collection
- Gold Medal Studios, a revival of Biograph Studios
- Gold Medal Books, U.S. book publisher
- Gold Medal flour, a product of General Mills
- Gold Medal Park, park in Minneapolis, Minnesota, USA
- Rosa 'Gold Medal', a rose cultivar

== Other ==
- Gold Medal in Metal (2008 CD/DVD) metal music by Dream Evil
- Medaglia d'Oro (racehorse), an American racehorse
- Triple Gold Club

== See also ==
- Gold (disambiguation)
- Medal
- Silver Medal
- Bronze Medal
- Gold Medallion (disambiguation)
- Gold Star (disambiguation)
- Gold Award (disambiguation)
