= Yellow star =

Yellow star may refer to:

- A yellow star in stellar classification
- A yellow badge, a cloth patch that Jews were ordered to wear on their clothes
- Any plant of genus Hypoxis in the family Hypoxidaceae
- "Yellow Star", a song by Donovan from his album Essence to Essence
- The Yellow Star: The Persecution of the Jews in Europe 1933-45, a 1980 documentary film
- Yellow Star (novel), a 2006 children's novel describing life in the Lodz Ghetto during World War II
- Bora Kim, also known as YellOwStaR, French professional League of Legends player
- Yellow Star (film), a 1922 German silent drama film
- Red star, some countries use a five-pointed star with a red background and yellow star as their national symbol

== See also ==
- Gold Star (disambiguation)
- Golden Star (disambiguation)
- Honorary Order of the Yellow Star
