= Silver Star (disambiguation) =

The Silver Star is a medal awarded for gallantry in action while in combat as a member of any of the United States Armed Forces.

Silver Star or Silverstar may also refer to:

- Edelweiss, a flower
- Silver award star, an attachment worn on meritorious medals of the United States Department of the Navy
- Silver service star, an attachment worn on campaign medals and service decorations
- A religious term used in Western Initiatory Kabbalah

== Arts, entertainment, media ==
- "Silver Star" (1910 song), a popular song composed in 1910 by Charles L. Johnson
- Silver Star (album), a 1977 Gary Glitter album
- "Silver Star" (The Four Seasons song), 1976
- Lunar: The Silver Star, a GameArts RPG released in North America in 1993 for the Sega CD
- Lunar: Silver Star Story Complete a GameArts RPG released in North America in 1999 for the PlayStation
- Silver Star (comics), a Pacific Comics and Topps Comics comic book by Jack Kirby
- Silver Stars (reggae), a reggae group led by Clancy Eccles
- "Silver Star" (The Unit), an episode of the television series The Unit
- The Silver Star (film), a 1955 American film
- Silverstar (film), a 2022 Dutch film

== Locations ==
- Silver Star Provincial Park, a provincial park in British Columbia, Canada
- Silver Star Mountain Resort, or SilverStar, a ski resort in British Columbia, Canada, located near the provincial park
- Silver Star Mountain (disambiguation), multiple mountains in Washington, United States

== Organisations ==
- Silver Star (charity), a British-based diabetes charity
- Silver Star Motor Services, an English bus and coach operator from 1923 to 1963
- Argenteum Astrum (Latin for silver star), a magical order created by Aleister Crowley in 1907 after leaving the Hermetic Order of the Golden Dawn

== Sport ==
- Silver Stars (South Africa), a South African Premier Soccer League club
- San Antonio Silver Stars, a team in the Women's National Basketball Association (WNBA) based in San Antonio, Texas

== Vehicles ==
- CT-133 Silver Star, a Canadian military training aircraft
- Silver Star (Amtrak train), a passenger train operated by the National Railroad Passenger Corporation (Amtrak)
- Silver Star (NZR train), a luxury passenger train that ran in New Zealand
- Silver Star (roller coaster), a hypercoaster and Europe's highest and third fastest roller coaster
- SS Silverstar (1951–1956), a small passenger ship retrofitted from HMS Bruiser (F127)

== Other uses ==
- Silverstar E-PC, a variant of the netbook Skytone Alpha-400

== See also ==
- Silverstar (disambiguation)
- Silver (disambiguation)
- Star (disambiguation)
- Silver Award (disambiguation)
- Silver Medallion (disambiguation)
- Gold Star (disambiguation)
- Bronze star (disambiguation)
- Award star
- Eun-byul, a Korean given name which sometimes means "silver star"
