= Silver Medallion =

Silver Medallion may refer to:

- Silver Retirement Medallion of the U.S. Central Intelligence Agency
- Telluride Film Festival Silver Medallion
- Shingo Silver Medallion, one of the Shingo Prize for Operational Excellence
- Silver Medallion (horse), winner of the 1990 Shadwell Turf Mile Stakes

== See also ==
- Silver (disambiguation)
- Medallion (disambiguation)
- Gold Medallion (disambiguation)
- Bronze Medallion (disambiguation)
- Silver medal
