= Bronze star (disambiguation) =

Bronze star may refer to:

- Bronze Star Medal, a U.S. military decoration
- Bronze service star, an attachment worn on campaign medals and service decorations
- Bronze star, Canadian life saving award of the Royal Life Saving Society of Canada
- Bronze Bauhinia Star, the lowest grade of the Bauhinia Star of Hong Kong

== See also ==
- Bronze Medal (disambiguation)
- Bronze Medallion (disambiguation)
- Bronze Award (disambiguation)
- Silver Star (disambiguation)
- Gold Star (disambiguation)
- Bronze (disambiguation)
- Star (disambiguation)
