= Gold Award =

Gold Award may refer to:

Several organizations issue awards with this name:

- A level of the Duke of Edinburgh's Award
- Gold Awards, honouring the best performers in Indian television industry
- The Gold Award (Girl Scouts of the USA)
- The former Gold Award of the Venturing program of the Boy Scouts of America

== See also ==
- Gold (disambiguation)
- Award (disambiguation)
- Gold Star (disambiguation)
- Gold medal (disambiguation)
- Silver Award (disambiguation)
- Bronze Award (disambiguation)
