= Gold Star =

Gold Star, Goldstar, or similar may refer to:

== Awards and decorations ==
- Hero of the Soviet Union, a medal awarded as a gold star
- Hero of the Russian Federation, the medal succeeding the aforementioned Soviet medal, also awarded as a gold star
- Gold Star Order, awarded in Vietnam
- Gold Star Service Banner, United States service flag for family of members who died during military service
- Gold 5/16 inch star, a United States ribbon device indicating an additional award

== Brands and enterprises ==
- BSA Gold Star, 500 cc 4-stroke production motorcycle
- Gold Star Chili, restaurant located in Cincinnati, Ohio known for serving Cincinnati-style chili
- Goldstar (beer), an Israeli brand of beer
- GoldStar, former Korean electronics company and predecessor to LG Electronics (which still uses the name as a budget brand in the US)
- Goldstar Events, an online discount ticket retailer for entertainment events
- Goldstar shoes, a Nepali shoe brand

=== Music industry ===
- Gold Star Records, record label issued by the Quinn Recording Company of Houston, Texas, in the mid-20th century
- Gold Star Studios, major independent recording studio located in Los Angeles, California
- Gold Star Studios, independent recording studio in Houston, Texas, later re-named SugarHill

== Fictional characters ==
- Goldstar (character), the name of several fictional characters from DC Comics
- Commissioner Goldstar, a major character in Fresh Beat Band of Spies

== Sports ==
- Confederation of Australian Motor Sport (CAMS) Gold Star, awarded to the winner of the Australian Drivers' Championship, the country's premier open wheel motor racing series
- Kinboshi or Gold Star, awarded in the sport of Sumo to any Maegashira-level wrestler who defeats any of the top-ranked Yokozuna in a bout
- Gold Star, a former name of the defunct Nippon Professional Baseball team, the Daiei Stars
- Gold Star FC, an American professional soccer team based in Metro Detroit.
- Bibiani Gold Stars F.C., Ghanaian professional football team

== Other uses ==
- Gold Star Bridge, a pair of steel truss bridges located in New London, Connecticut, U.S.
- Gold star (slang), any of the LGBT slang terms gold star gay, gold star lesbian and gold star asexual
- American Gold Star Mothers, a nonprofit organization
- "Gold Stars" (Adventure Time), a 2015 TV episode
- Venus or gold star

== See also ==
- Bronze star (disambiguation)
- Gold (disambiguation)
- Gold Award (disambiguation)
- Gold medal (disambiguation)
- Golden Star (disambiguation)
- Silver Star (disambiguation)
- Star (disambiguation)
