= List of gold medal awards =

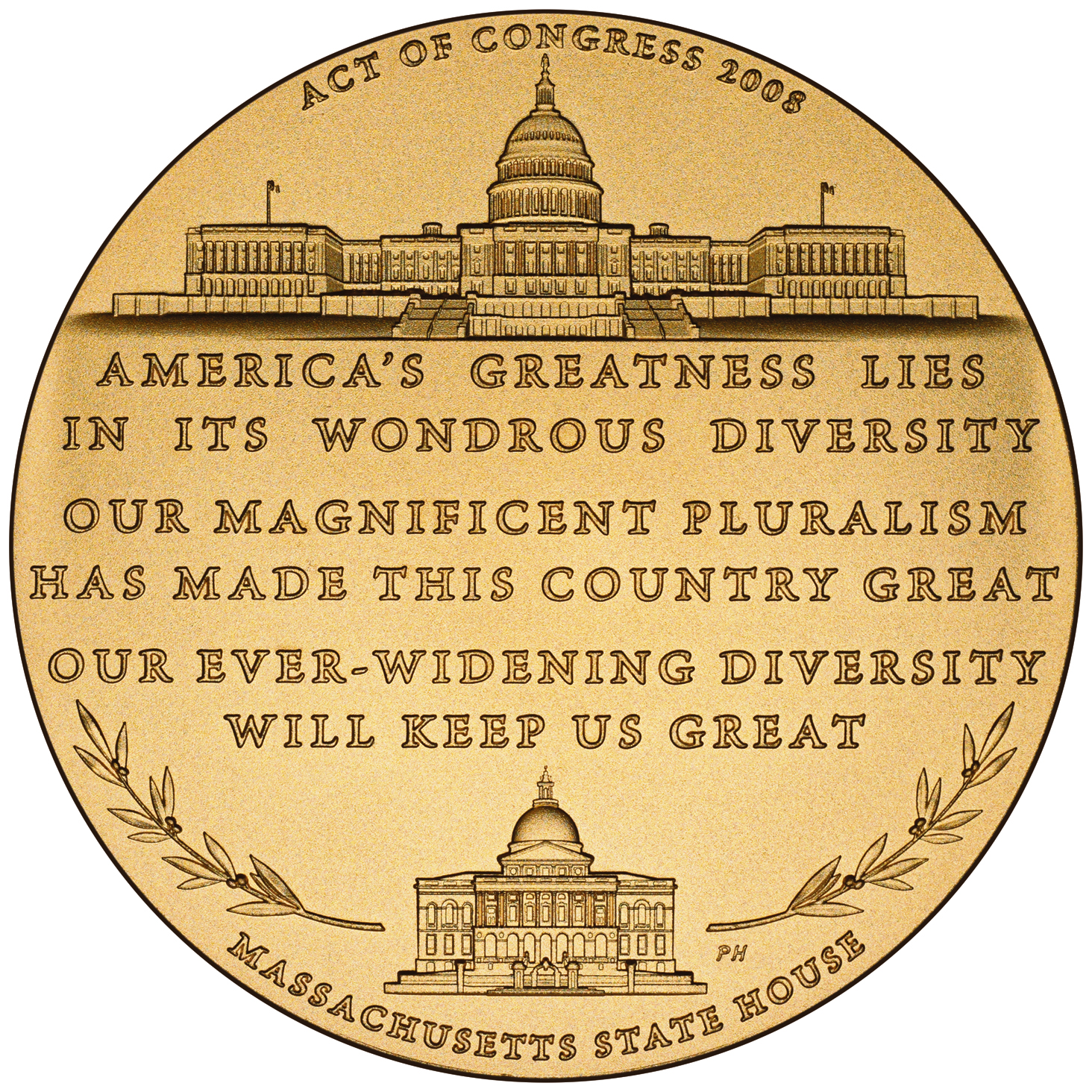
Congressional Gold Medal (reverse side)

Gold medals are awards typically given for the highest achievement in a field or competition.

== Awards ==
=== Science and engineering ===
- AAG Gold Medal, awarded by the Association of Applied Geochemists
- AIA Gold Medal, awarded by the American Institute of Architects
- Blodgett Gold Medal, awarded by the Institute of Physics
- Bragg Gold Medal, awarded by the Institute of Physics
- Australian Institute of Architects Gold Medal, the highest award of the Australian Institute of Architects
- Carl Mannerfelt Gold Medal of the International Cartographic Association
- CNRS Gold medal, the highest scientific research award in France
- Dirac Gold Medal, awarded by the Institute of Physics
- Faraday Gold Medal, awarded by the Institute of Physics
- Glazebrook Medal, awarded by the Institute of Physics
- Gold Medal Award for Distinguished Archaeological Achievement, awarded by the Archaeological Institute of America
- Gold Medal of the Maritime Institute of Ireland
- Gold Medal of the Royal Astronomical Society, the highest award of the Royal Astronomical Society
- Gold Medal of the Royal Society of Medicine
- Gold Medal of the Royal Canadian Geographical Society
- Gold Medal of the Royal Scottish Geographical Society
- Founder's Medal and Patron's Medal, awarded by the Royal Geographical Society, UK
- Gold Medal of the Institution of Structural Engineers
- Kelvin Gold Medal, awarded by the Institute of Physics
- Langley Gold Medal, awarded for aeronautics and astronautics by the Smithsonian Institution
- Lomonosov Gold Medal, award in the natural sciences and the humanities by the Russian Academy of Sciences
- Newton Gold Medal, awarded by the Institute of Physics
- Oswald Watt Gold Medal, awarded by Royal Federation of Aero Clubs of Australia
- Penrose Gold Medal, awarded for geology by the Society of Economic Geologists
- Royal Gold Medal, awarded by the Royal Institute of British Architects, UK
- SPIE Gold Medal, the highest honor of Society for Optics and Photonics
- Symons Gold Medal of the Royal Meteorological Society
- Mason Gold Medal of the Royal Meteorological Society

=== Military ===
- Gold Medal of Military Valour, an Italian military award established in 1793
- Army Gold Medal, a British military campaign medal
- Gold Service Medal, of South Africa

=== Sport ===
- Olympic gold medal
- Svenska Dagbladet Gold Medal, for Swedish sports achievement of the year, awarded by the Swedish newspaper Svenska Dagbladet
- Mediterranean Games

=== Arts ===
- ALS Gold Medal, awarded by the Australian Literature Society
- Gold Medal (National Eisteddfod of Wales), awarded for excellence in the arts by the National Eisteddfod of Wales
- Photoplay Gold Medal, a cinematic award (1944–1968) of Photoplay magazine
- Robert Capa Gold Medal, for photography, awarded by the Overseas Press Club of America

=== Other ===
- Congressional Gold Medal, awarded by the United States Congress
- Department of Commerce Gold Medal, the highest award presented by the United States Secretary of Commerce
- PDSA Gold Medal, awarded by the UK's People's Dispensary for Sick Animals

== See also ==
- Gold medal (disambiguation)
- Gold Award (disambiguation)
