= Golden Star =

Golden Star or Golden Stars may refer to:

== Botany ==
- Golden Star (carambola)
- Triteleia ixioides, flower in Triteleia known as "golden star"

== Business ==
- Golden Star Ferries, Greece
- Golden Star Resources
- Golden Star (newspaper), from British Columbia, Canada

== Music ==
- Golden Star, 2005 compilation album series featuring Timi Yuro and other artists
- Golden Stars (Baccara album) compilation album
- Golden Star, album by Raju Singh

== Sports ==
- Shandong Golden Stars

=== Football ===
- Golden Star (football club), from Martinique
- Erakor Golden Star F.C., from Vanuatu
- Jigawa Golden Stars F.C., from Nigeria

== Other uses ==
- Ganesh (actor), Indian actor nicknamed "Golden Star"
- Golden Star Festival, an event in the Tibetan calendar to wash away sins
- Venus or golden star

== See also ==
- Gold Star (disambiguation)
- Golden (disambiguation)
- Star (disambiguation)
