= Bath Festival =

Bath Festival may refer to:

- Bath International Music Festival
- Bath Festival of Blues 1969
- Bath Festival of Blues and Progressive Music
- Bath Festival of Children's Literature
- Bath Fringe Festival

== See also ==
- Bathing Festival (disambiguation)
