= Bathing Festival =

Bathing Festival may refer to:

== Hindu culture ==
- Kumbh Melas
  - Haridwar Kumbh Mela
  - Allahabad Kumbh Mela
  - Ujjain Simhastha
  - Nashik-Trimbakeshwar Simhastha
- Makar Sankranti
- Pushkaram
- Snana Yatra

== Others ==
- Tibetan Golden Star Festival
- Nepali Maghe Sankranti
- Indonesian Malay Mandi Safar

== See also ==
- Bath Festival (disambiguation)
- Water Festival
