= Salisbury bus station =

Bus station in Salisbury, Wiltshire, England

Coordinates: 51.070°N 1.794°W

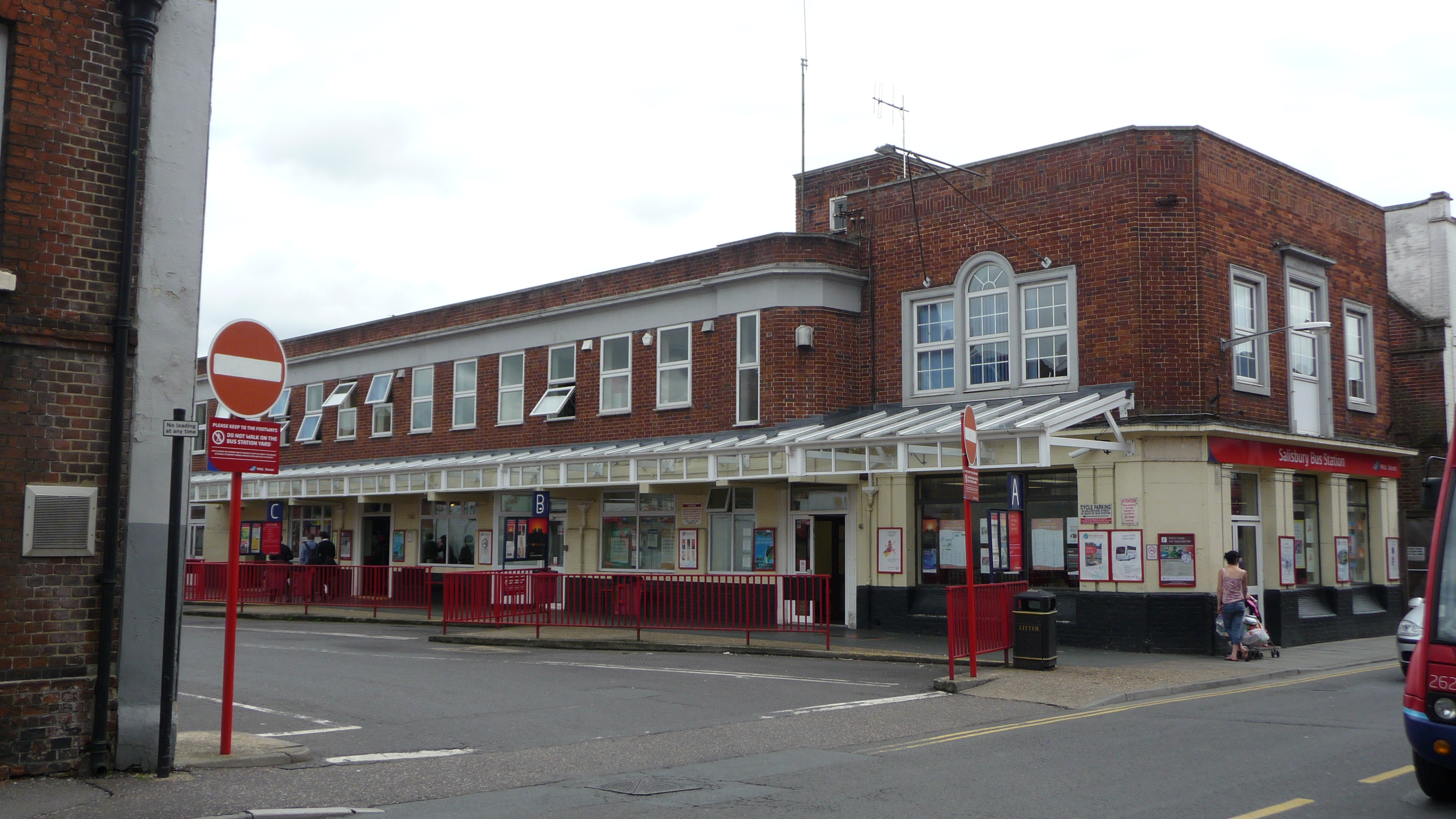
- The bus station in 2009

General information
- Location: Endless Street, Salisbury; Wiltshire
- Bus stands: 5 (A-E)
- Bus operators: Salisbury Reds

History
- Opened: 1939
- Closed: January 2014
Location

Salisbury bus station was a bus station in the city of Salisbury, Wiltshire, England. The station had five stands underneath a red brick building which was built in 1939 as the headquarters of the Wilts & Dorset bus company. It was closed in 2014 on the grounds of high maintenance costs.

== Services ==
The only operator at the station in its later years was the Salisbury Reds brand of Wilts & Dorset, by then a subsidiary of the Go-Ahead Group. The station was mainly a hub for local services, including Salisbury's park and ride scheme serving five sites around the city. Longer distance services, known as 'X' services, ran between the city and other surrounding areas, such as Southampton (X7), Pewsey (X4) and Bournemouth (X3). National Express coach services have always called at the Millstream coach park in the northwest of the city centre.

== Closure ==
Only a third of Salisbury Reds' services called at the station by the time it closed in January 2014. It was also expensive to run, with services later making use of street stops and the city's park and ride sites instead.

Despite being described as outdated and underused by Salisbury Reds, the station's closure, announced in November 2012, was unpopular with Salisbury residents as it provided a focal point for services. A spokesperson from Salisbury Reds also said that the station was originally opened for the much larger Wilts and Dorset bus company and the present company didn't need all of the space available. Even though the main reason for closing the station was to cut the costs of maintaining the ageing building, Salisbury Reds had been awarded £400,000 in March that year to improve the station and its services. The station was closed at the same time as Amesbury bus station.

== Present day ==
Shortly after closure, the bus station was demolished. The construction of retirement homes, branded as 'Sarum Lodge', on the site was completed in February 2018. Despite the closure of the station, Salisbury retains its Park and Ride services which terminate at various street stops in the city centre.
