= Bronze (disambiguation) =

Bronze is an alloy of copper with any of several other metals, often tin.

Bronze may also refer to:

- Bronze (color), the tint of the metal
- Bronze (comics), a character in Marvel Comics
- Bronze (horse), a racehorse
- Bronze (racial classification), persons of combined Latin European and Indigenous American ancestry
- Bronze (turkey), a breed of domestic turkey
- Bronze Age, an early period of historical development
- Bronze Night, a series of riots in Estonia in 2007
- Bronze Records, an English independent record label
- Bronze sculpture, a piece of art made of bronze
- Bronze Soldier of Tallinn, a controversial Soviet WW2 Monument in Tallinn, Estonia
- Bronze Sunbird, a species of bird found in Africa
- In chemistry, various mixed oxides with metallic sheen, such as
  - Sodium tungsten bronze Na_{x}WO_{3}
  - Molybdenum purple bronze A_{0.9}Mo_{6}O_{17}, A = Li, Na, K, Rb, Tl
- Lucy Bronze (born 1991), English association footballer
- The Bronze (film), a 2015 comedy film
- The Bronze, a fictional nightclub in Buffy the Vampire Slayer
- The Bronze, a song by Queens of the Stone Age on their album, The Split CD

== See also ==
- Bronze Cross (disambiguation)
- Bronze Medal (disambiguation)
- Bronze Medallion (disambiguation), an award in several organizations
- Bronze star (disambiguation)
- Bronz, a musical group
- Bronzer, a tanning product
- Bronzing, a process by which an object is preserved by electroplating with copper
- Compact disc bronzing
