= Bronze Medallion =

Bronze Medallion may refer to:

- Bronze Medallion (Australia and New Zealand)
- Bronze Medallion (Canada)
- Bronze Medallion (New York City award)
- Bronze Medallion (United Kingdom)
- Bronze Retirement Medallion, of the U.S. CIA

== See also ==
- Bronze (disambiguation)
- Medallion (disambiguation)
- Bronze Award (disambiguation)
- Bronze Medal (disambiguation)
- Bronze Star Medal
- Bronze star (disambiguation)
