= Bronze Award =

Bronze Award may refer to:

- Bronze Award (Girl Scouts of the USA)
- Venturing Bronze award, a former award from the Venturing program of the Boy Scouts of America
- A level of The Duke of Edinburgh's Award

== See also ==
- Bronze (disambiguation)
- Award (disambiguation)
- Bronze medal
- Bronze Medallion (disambiguation)
- Bronze star (disambiguation)
