= Silver Star Mountain =

Silver Star Mountain can refer to:

- Silver Star Mountain (Skamania County, Washington), USA
- Silver Star Mountain (Okanogan County, Washington), USA
- Silver Star Mountain Resort, British Columbia, Canada

== See also ==
- Silver Star (disambiguation)
