= Wilts & Dorset =

Former bus operator in Southern England

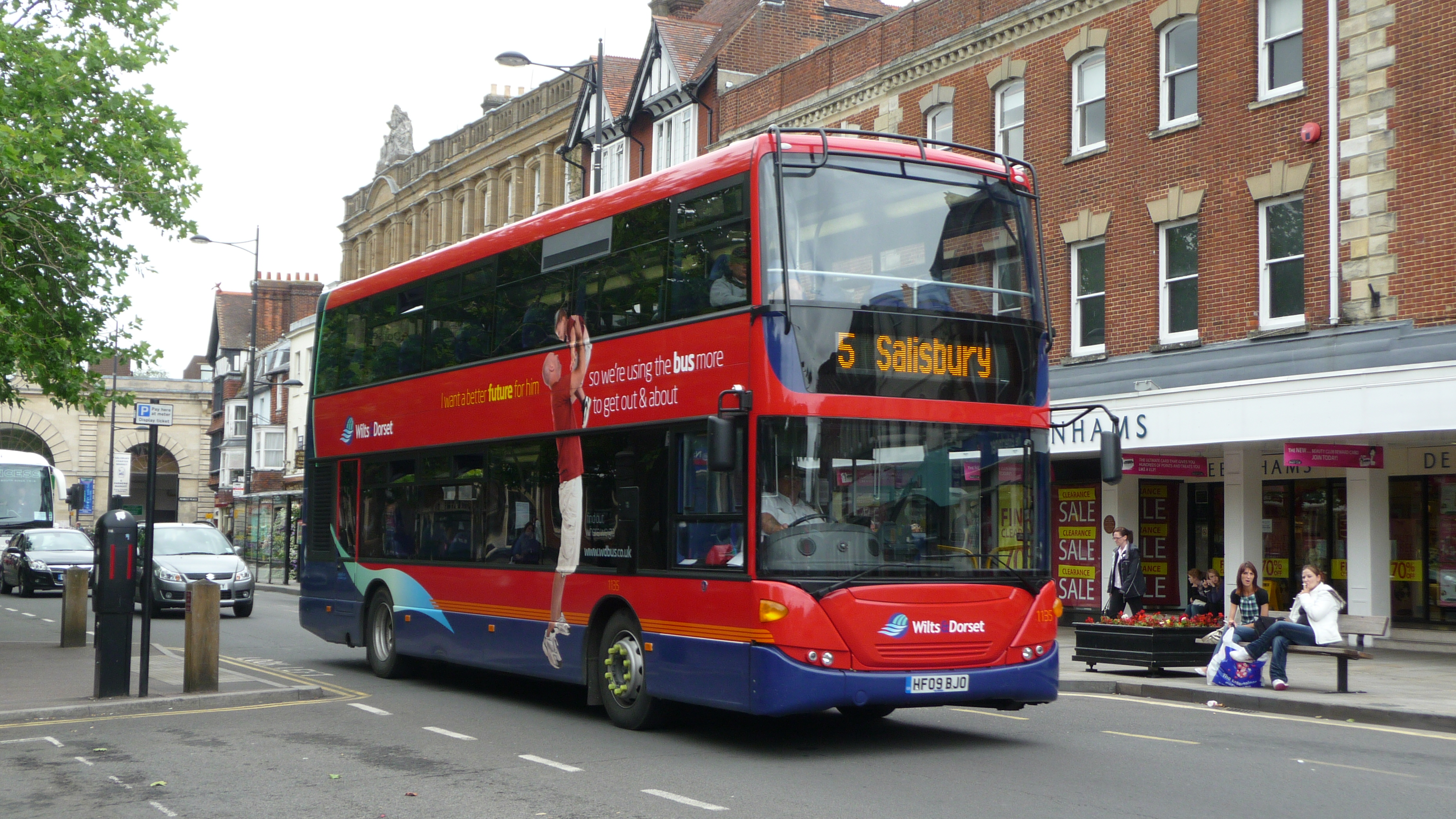
- Scania OmniCity in Salisbury in July 2009
- Parent: Go South Coast (part of the Go-Ahead Group)
- Founded: 1915; 110 years ago
- Ceased operation: July 2012; 13 years ago
- Headquarters: Poole, Dorset, England
- Service area: Dorset; Hampshire; Wiltshire
- Service type: Bus services
- Website: http://www.wdbus.co.uk/

Wilts & Dorset was a bus and coach operator providing services in East Dorset, South Wiltshire and West Hampshire. It was purchased by Go-Ahead Group in 2003 and was rebranded as Morebus in Dorset and Salisbury Reds in Wiltshire in 2012.

== History ==
Past Logos

Wilts & Dorset logo used between 1917 and 1963

Wilts & Dorset logo used between 1983 and 1986

Wilts & Dorset logo used between 1986 and 2002

Wilts & Dorset logo used between 2002 and 2012

=== Original company ===
Wilts & Dorset Motor Services Limited was incorporated in 1915, with its head office in Amesbury, Wiltshire, moving to Salisbury in 1917. The company's first route was between Salisbury and Amesbury. The company grew rapidly in the Andover, Amesbury, Blandford Forum, Pewsey and Salisbury areas; despite the name, the company's operations were mainly in the southern part of Wiltshire and the northern part of Hampshire. The Southern Railway and Thomas Tilling obtained shares in 1931, with Wilts & Dorset being nationalised in 1948. It acquired Venture of Basingstoke in 1950, in a reorganisation following the nationalisation of Venture's parent, Red & White, and acquired Silver Star of Porton Down, Wiltshire in May 1963.

In 1963, the management of Wilts & Dorset passed to Hants & Dorset, a neighbouring state-owned bus company. In 1969, both companies became part of the National Bus Company (NBC) and, in October 1972, both companies were merged under the Hants & Dorset name, with the Wilts & Dorset name ceasing to be used.

=== Re-establishment and privatisation ===
The Transport Act 1985 led to the privatisation of the NBC, and in preparation for deregulation taking effect on 26 October 1986, Hants & Dorset was split into three operating companies in April 1983, one of which was the Wilts & Dorset Bus Company. The new Wilts & Dorset company's operating area was considerably larger than its older namesake, including Swanage, Poole, Bournemouth, Lymington, Devizes, Swindon and Salisbury, but not Basingstoke. Depots were located in Blandford Forum, Lymington, Pewsey, Poole, Ringwood, Salisbury and Swanage.

In June 1987, Wilts & Dorset was sold in a management buyout, beating a rival bid for the takeover of the company by Badger Vectis, a short-lived consortium between former NBC subsidiaries Badgerline and Isle of Wight bus operator Southern Vectis; following the buyout, bus wars endured between Wilts & Dorset and Badgerline within Salisbury.

Damory Coaches of Blandford Forum was purchased in May 1993, followed by Oakfield Travel and Stanbridge & Crichel Bus Company in November 1993, and by Blandford Bus Company in January 1994; all were combined under the Damory Coaches name. Tourist Coaches was also purchased by Wilts & Dorset during the 1990s, Independents coach company Levers and Thamesdown Transport coaching arm Kingston Coaches were purchased and consolidated under the Tourist Coaches name; independent Bell's Coaches was later added in 2003.

=== Go-Ahead Group ownership ===
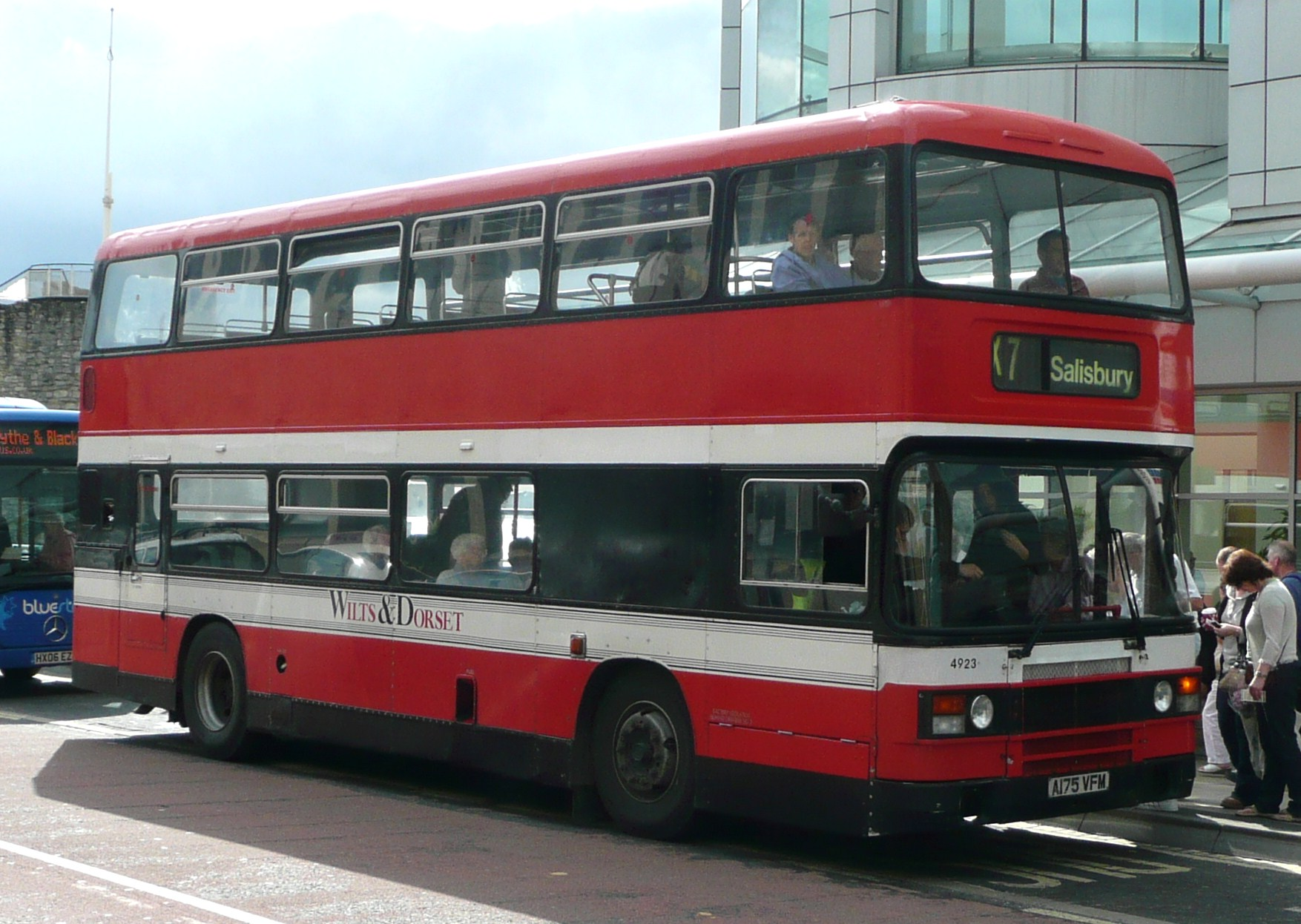
Leyland Olympian in Southampton in September 2008

On 11 August 2003, Wilts & Dorset was sold to the Go-Ahead Group for £31.6 million (equivalent to £63,104,000 in 2023).

On 31 July 2008, a Wilts & Dorset open-top bus collided with two cars between Studland and the local chain ferry, injuring 30 people. The bus, a route 50 service travelling from Swanage to Bournemouth, collided with both a Volkswagen Golf and a Porsche; the latter was driving away from the chain ferry on Ferry Road and crashed head on with the bus and the other car. A number of passengers reported the bus travelled a distance on two wheels and the eventual toppling took place at low speed. The top-deck passengers were all thrown off onto soft ground in a ditch and six passengers were taken to Poole Hospital with minor injuries. The driver of the Porsche was later convicted of driving without due care and attention.

In 2011, Wilts & Dorset trialled Go-Ahead Group's The Key smartcard ticketing system similar to London's Oyster card and the ITSO ticket used on National Rail services; the system was already in use by sister companies Brighton and Hove and Metrobus. In 2012, it was launched across the entire network, with passengers able to save up to 33% against purchasing paper tickets.

In July 2012, it was announced that the Wilts & Dorset name would be dropped from bus services in favour of the Morebus brand in Poole and Bournemouth, and Salisbury Reds in Salisbury and Amesbury, both managed as part of the Go South Coast operating company. In 2014, it was announced that the bus station on Endless Street in Salisbury would close in favour of town centre stops. The station had opened in 1939 as the headquarters of Wilts & Dorset.

== Operations ==
=== Bus services ===
==== Wimborne Flyer ====
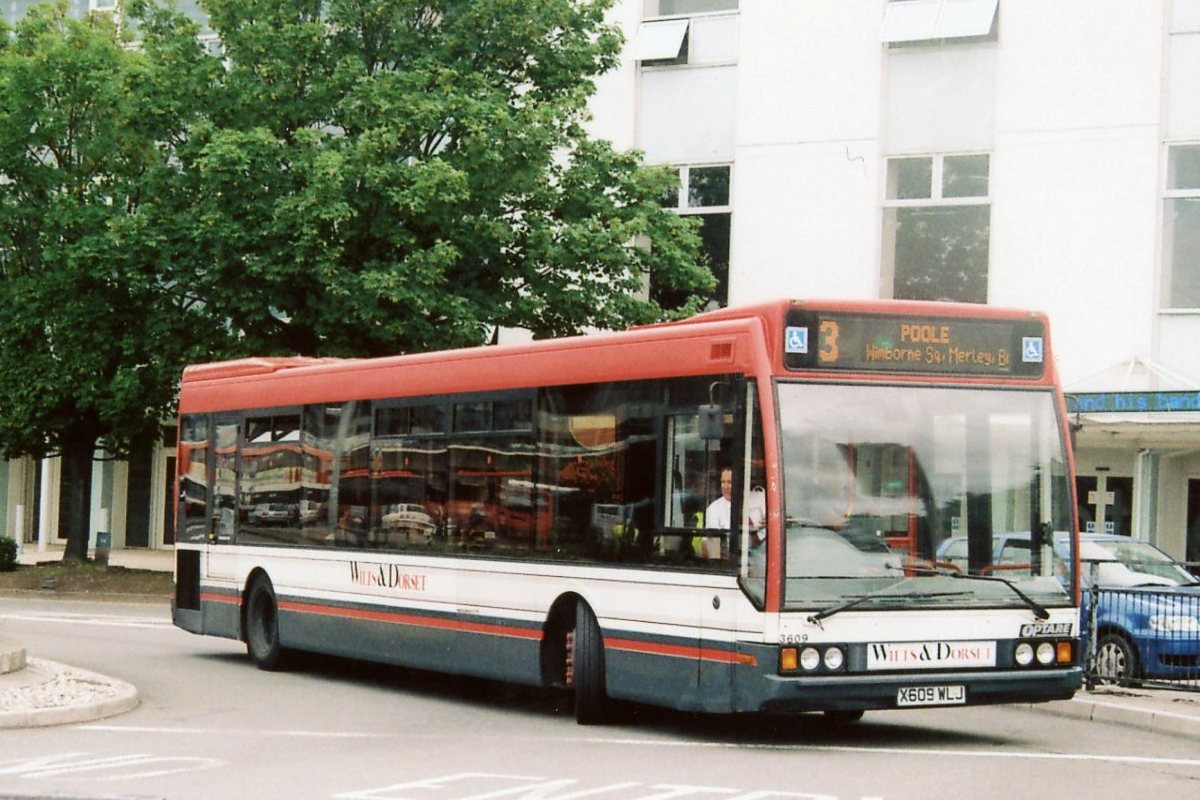
Optare Excel on Wimborne Flyer route 3 in Poole in July 2007

The Wimborne Flyer, now known as service 3, replaced the Poole to Wimborne section of service 132 after the major restructuring of Poole services in June 2006. It runs four times an hour Monday to Saturday. The service differs from the old service 132 by taking a direct route between Poole and Broadstone, using a faster route through Merley, and extending the service from Wimborne Square to the Leigh Park estate. The service, when launched, was almost exclusively operated by Mercedes-Benz Citaros in the new standard Wilts & Dorset livery, though 'more' Citaros and Wright Eclipse Urbans were also seen.

Local residents criticised the change of route, specifically through Merley where the buses took a narrower but more direct road through the estate. Some criticism has also been aimed at the Citaro buses after a number of accidents, including buses demolishing walls while trying to pass each other on a narrow road and tearing hanging baskets from walls in Wimborne Square while turning. Following numerous complaints, Wilts & Dorset rerouted the service through Merley from 29 October 2006, reverting to part of the old 132 route through Merley Gardens.

From 6 April 2008, two out of the four buses per hour started to run via Corfe Mullen rather than Merley with all services also stopping at Broadstone Broadway. Services to and from Leigh Park only run during the morning and evening peak. With the Wimborne Flyer now covering the section of route between Broadstone and Corfe Mullen, most service 4 journeys started to terminate at Broadstone.

As part of the 3 June 2012 network changes, the 3 was withdrawn and was merged with Route 4, which was extended beyond Broadstone to Wimborne either via Merley or Corfe Mullen. After many complaints, Route 4X was introduced between Poole & Broadstone/Merley via the old Route 3 during the morning and evening rush-hours towards the end of June 2012. Towards the end of July 2012 however, it was announced that Route 3 would be re-instated from 17 September 2012 and that both routes 3 & 4 would join the more brand.

==== Pulseline ====
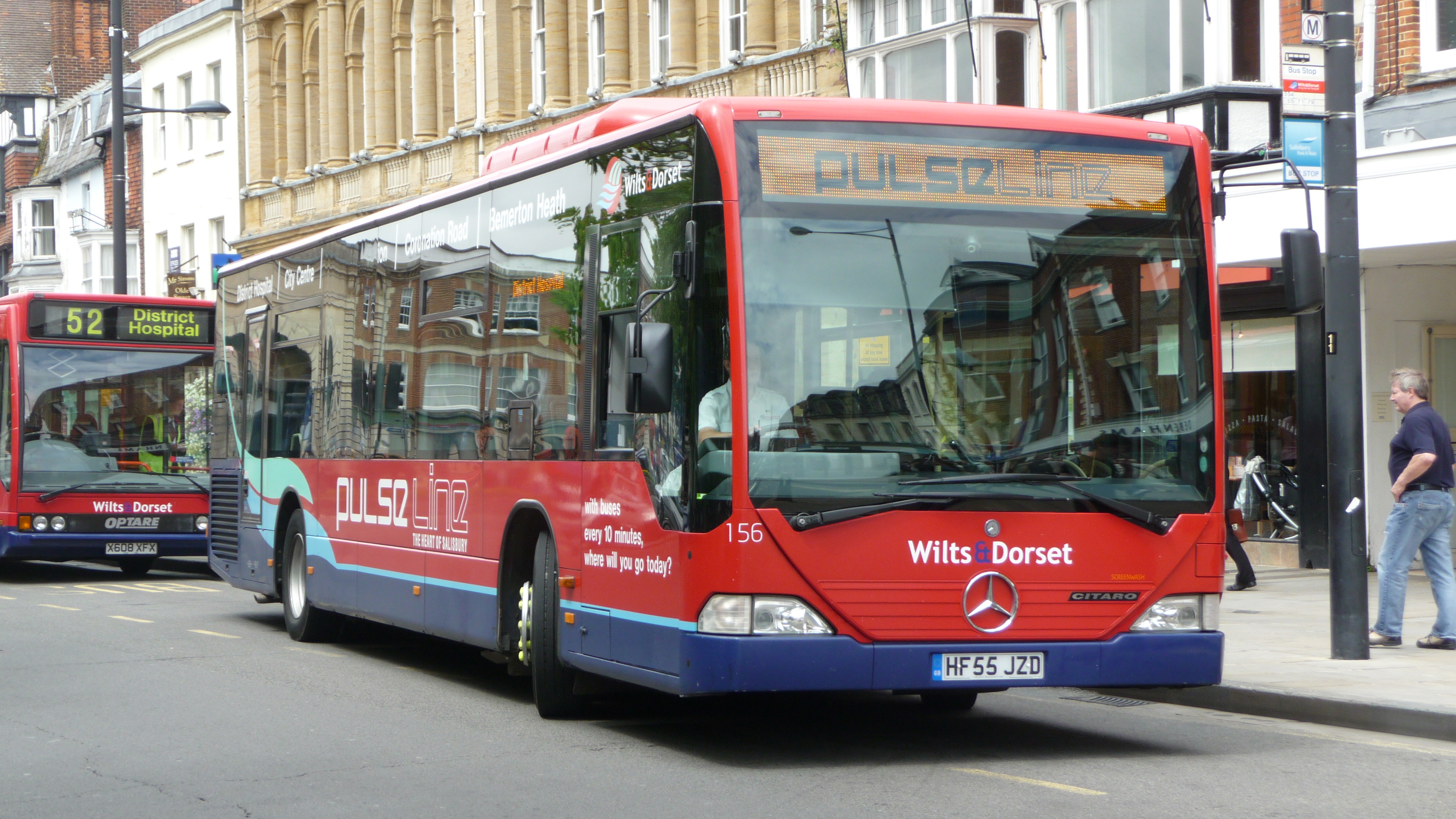
Mercedes-Benz Citaro with the previous "Pulseline" branding in Salisbury in July 2009

PulseLine was the name of services around Salisbury to the District Hospital. In 2010 the name was replaced by Salisbury Reds, using the previous Mercedes-Benz Citaros repainted in the revised Wilts & Dorset livery with Salisbury Reds branding. In addition to the Citaros, ex Southern Vectis Dennis Dart MPDs were transferred and repainted into Wilts & Dorset livery with branding applied.

=== Coaching ===
Coach operations were established by the company in the 1990s when Wilts & Dorset purchased Tourist Coaches of Figheldean, Wiltshire. Tourist Coaches operates public services within the Wiltshire area from the Salisbury Reds depot. It was founded in 1920 by E & DF Stanfield in Figheldean, Wiltshire. At the time, it provided both private coach hire and contract coach services for the military establishments around Salisbury Plain.

In Dorset, three acquisitions were made: Damory Coaches in May 1993, Oakfield Travel in November 1993, and Blandford Bus Company in January 1994. The latter three were then combined under the Damory Coaches name. Each operation that was purchased became a brand under the company, which run public and school routes within its own area. These continued during the split under their respective areas managed by the new companies.

== Gallery ==
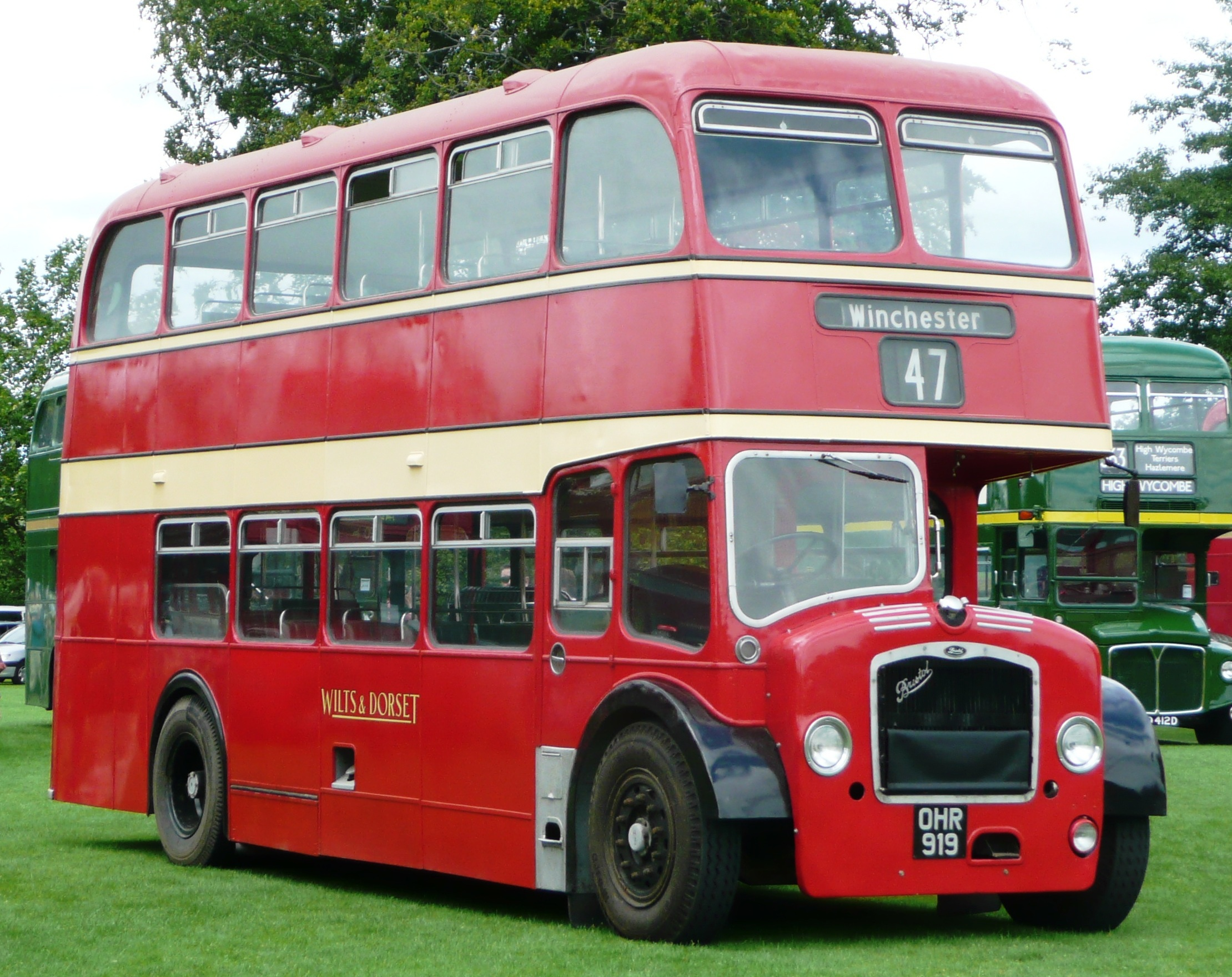
Preserved Bristol Lodekka

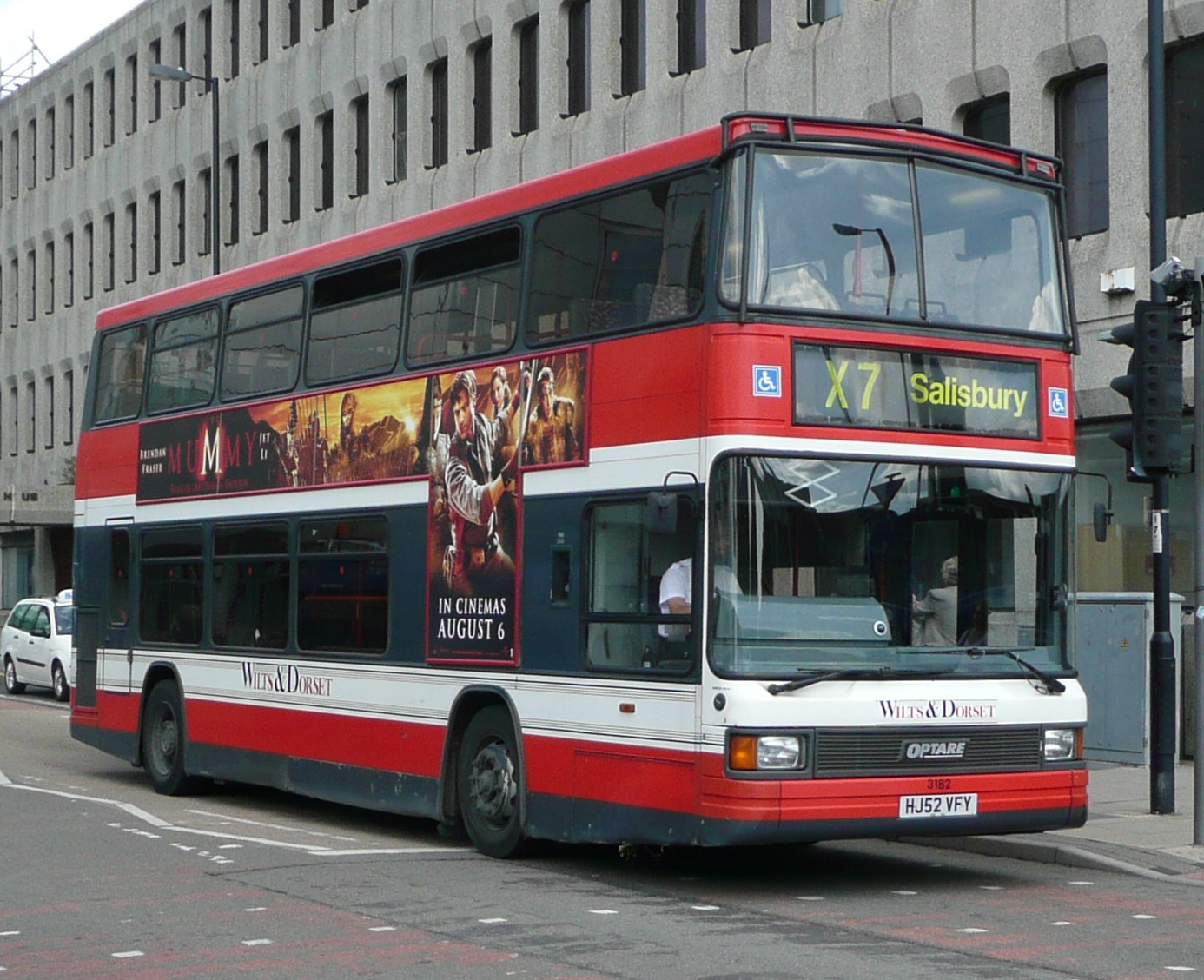
Optare Spectra bodied DAF DB250LF in Southampton in August 2008

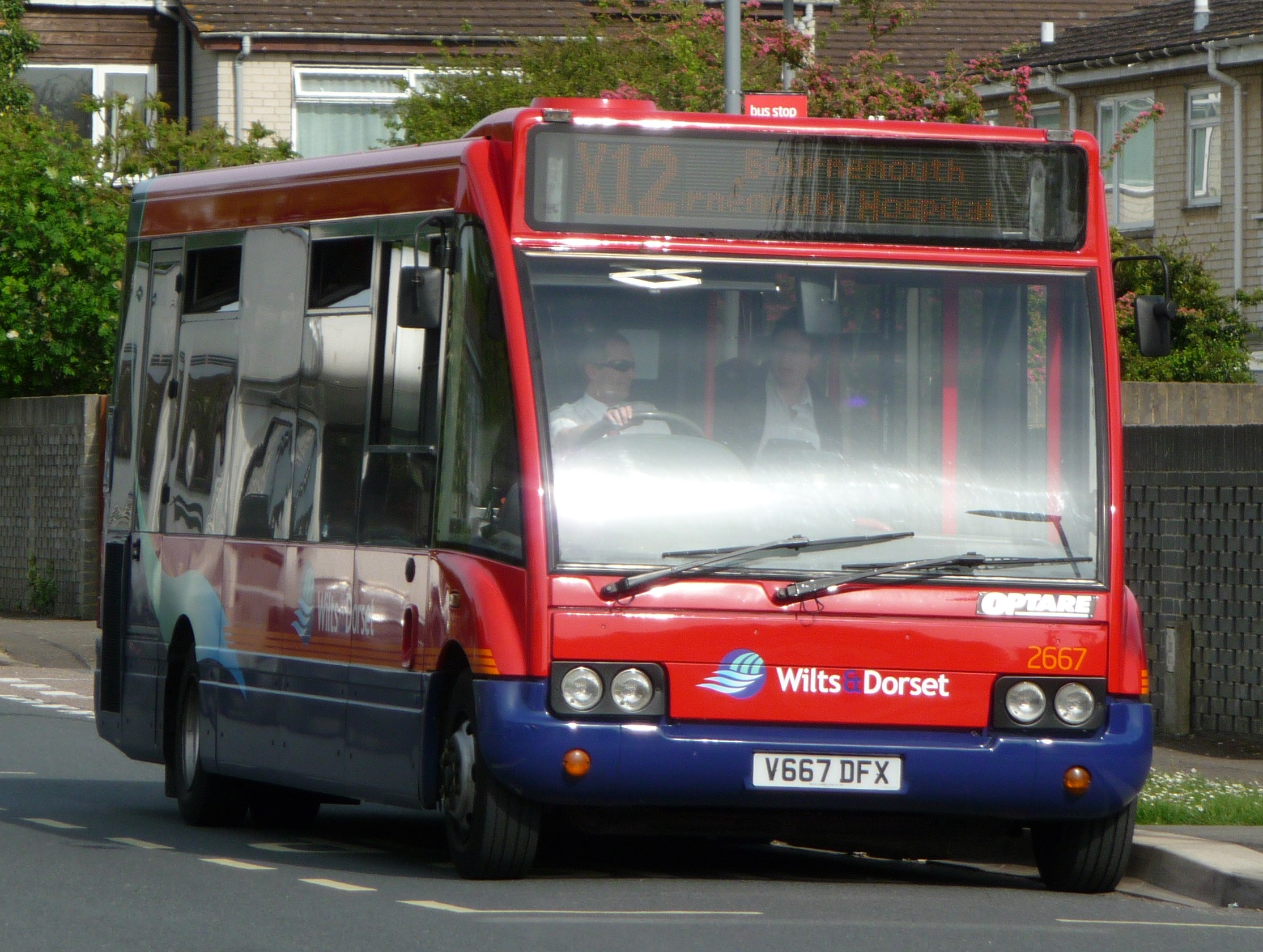
Optare Solo in Christchurch in May 2009

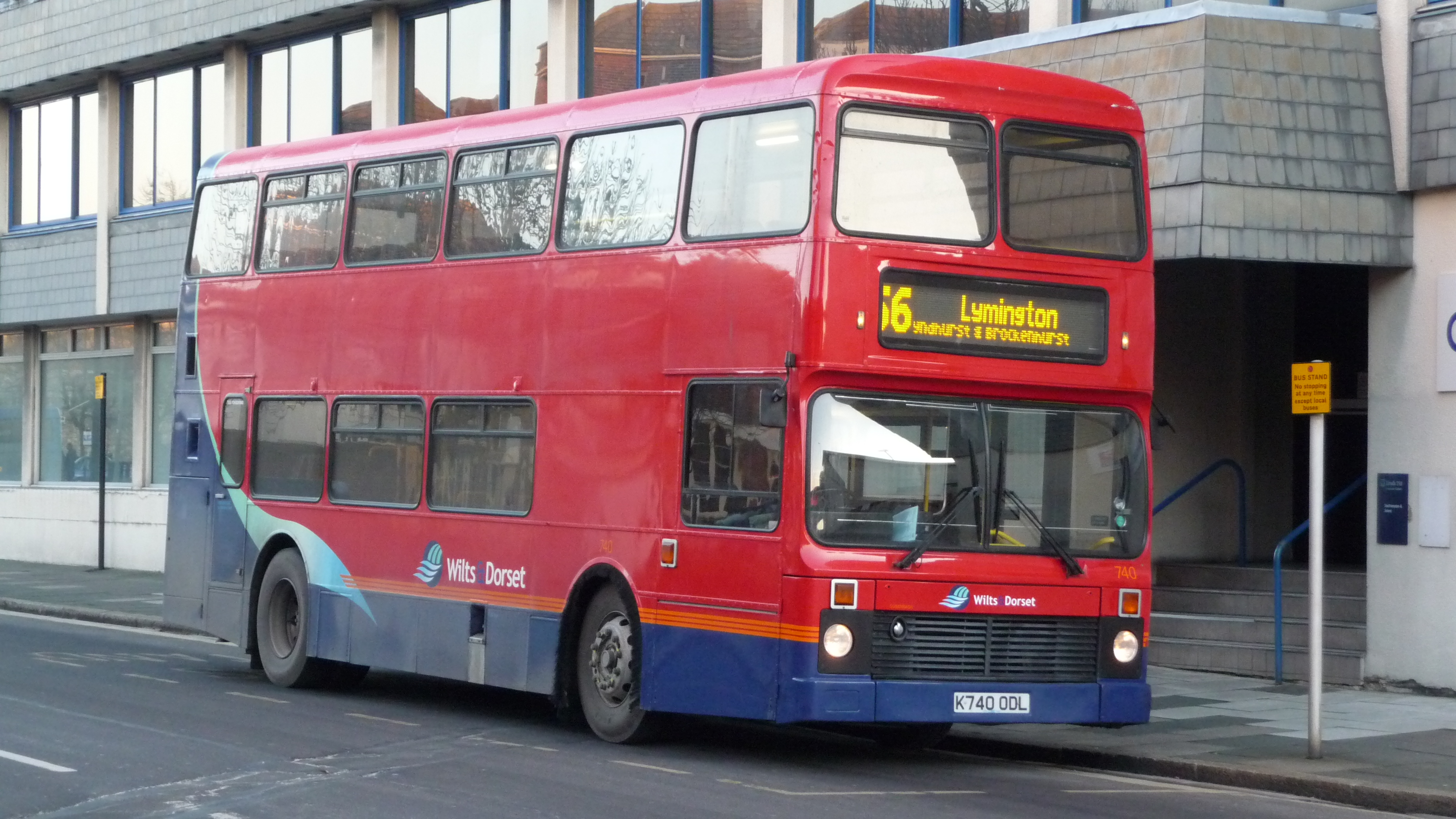
Northern Counties Palatine bodied Leyland Olympian in Southampton in December 2009

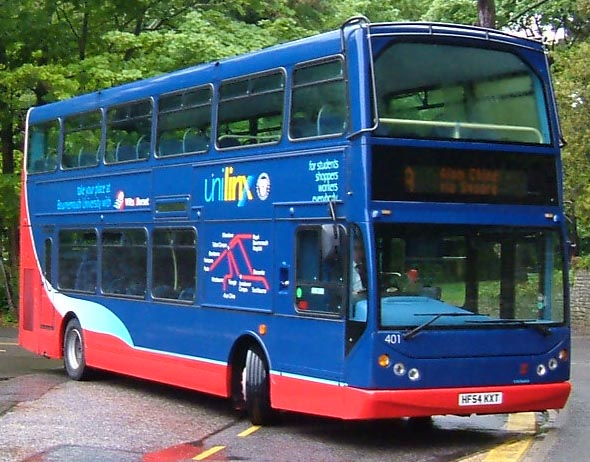
East Lancs Myllennium Vyking bodied Volvo B7TL in the previous Unilinx livery in June 2005

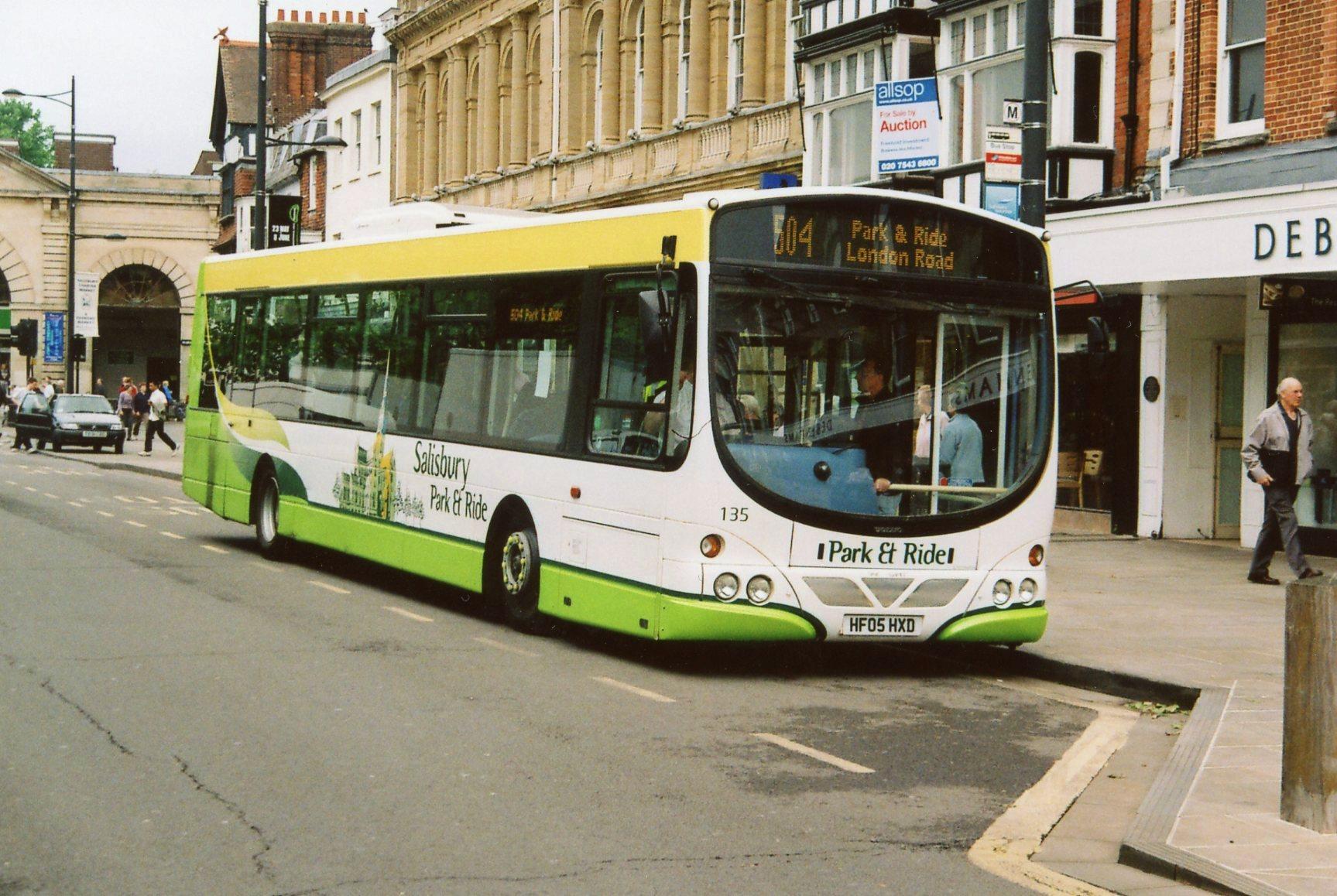
Wright Eclipse bodied Volvo B7RLE in park & ride livery in Salisbury in May 2008

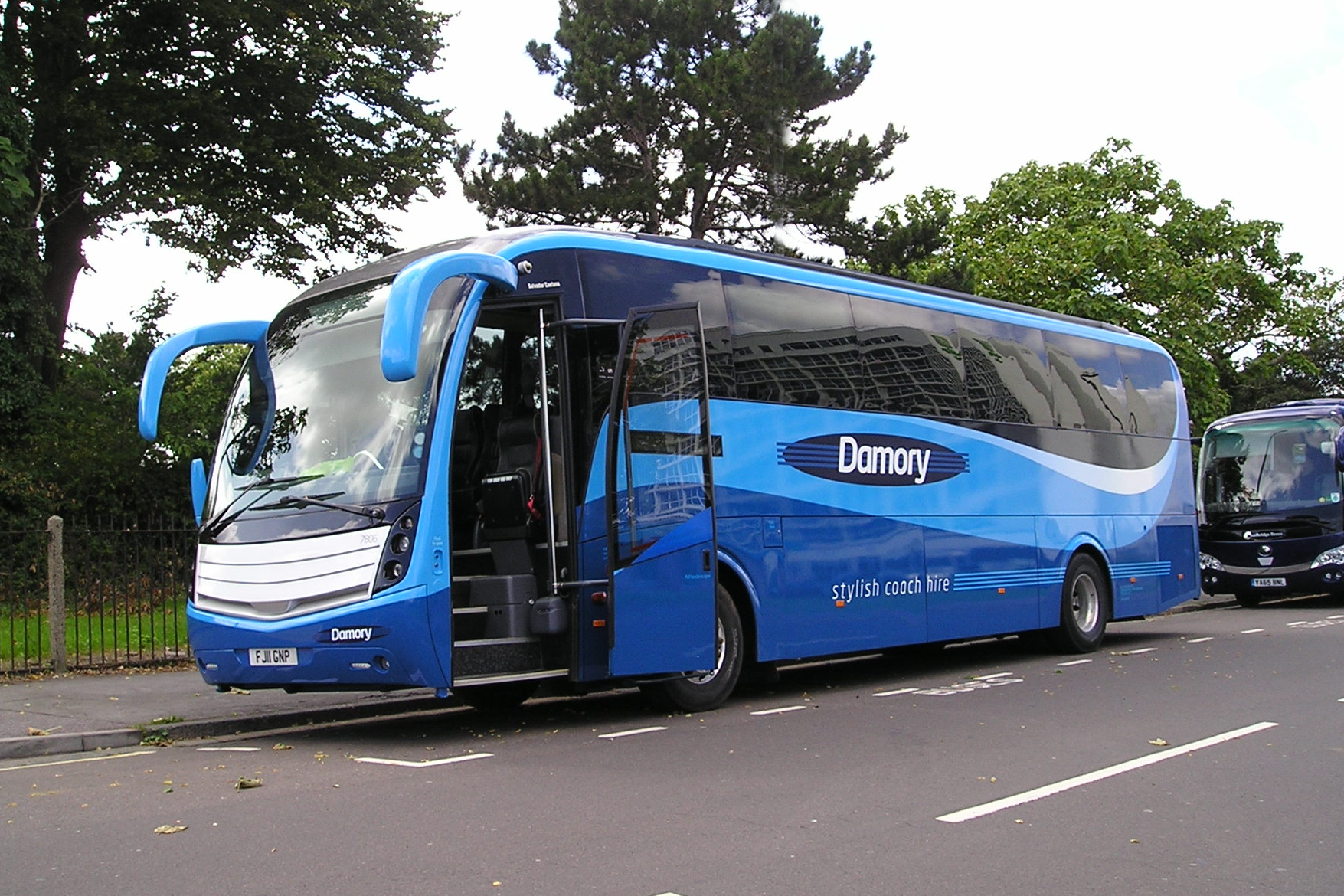
Caetano Levante bodied Volvo B9R in Damory Coaches livery in Southampton in August 2017.
