= Goldstar Events =

Goldstar
- Owner: TodayTix Group
- Launched: 2002; 24 years ago
- Current status: Inactive

Goldstar was an event discovery service based in Pasadena, California that sold tickets to leisure activities such as live entertainment, theatre, concerts, dance, film screenings, and sporting events.

In 2022, Goldstar was acquired by TodayTix Group, the global e-commerce leader for cultural experiences.

== History ==
Goldstar debuted February 14, 2002 and was launched by e-commerce experts Jim McCarthy, Richard Webster and Robert Graff. The website was the first to introduce user reviews and event ratings online for the live entertainment industry.
