= Silver Star Motor Services =

English bus and coach operator, 1923–1963

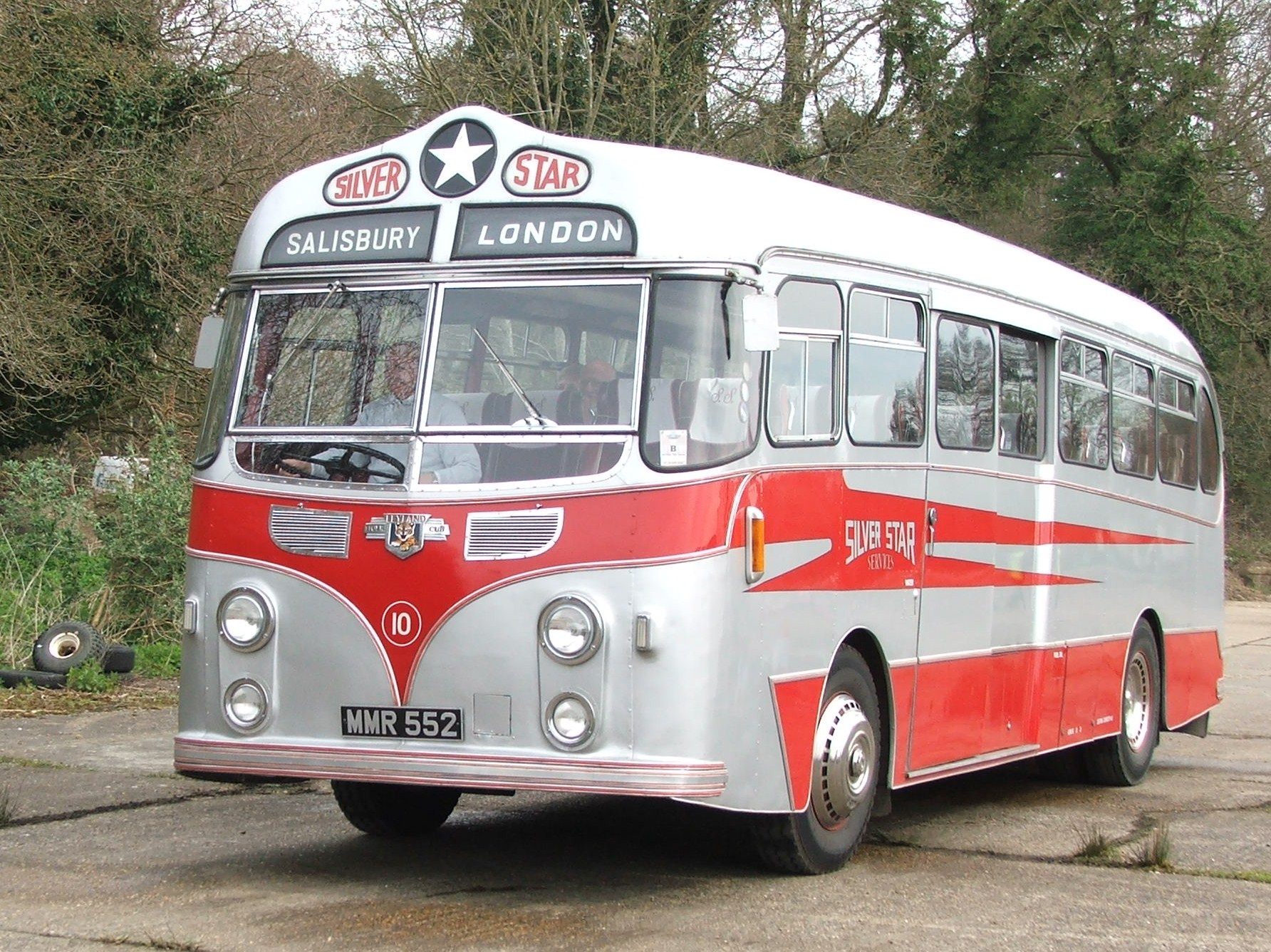
- Preserved ex-Silver Star Leyland Tiger Cub
- Founded: September 1923; 101 years ago
- Ceased operation: May 1963; 61 years ago
- Headquarters: Porton Down, Wiltshire
- Service area: Wiltshire
- Service type: Bus and coach operator

Silver Star Motor Services was a bus and coach operator in the south of England between 1923 and 1963.

== Origins to World War II ==
Silver Star Motor Services started operating services In September 1923, between Allington, Porton Camp and Salisbury, in the south of Wiltshire. The first vehicle was a Ford Model T, with a 14-seat body by Pitt of Fordingbridge. An additional route was started in 1926, linking Salisbury with the military camp at Sling. By 1927, the fleet had increased to five vehicles, including a rather unusual 6-wheeled Rolls Royce with seating for 20, and the company had taken over a building at Porton Camp. The first Leylands were acquired in 1929, and this soon came to be the dominant vehicle type in the fleet.

== World War II ==
In 1939 Silver Star acquired its first double decker vehicles, with six second hand Leyland Titan TD1s being purchased from the Yorkshire Woollen District Transport Company. These were required for transport of construction workers to the military camp at Figsbury Barracks. Soon after the start of World War II, several of the Silver Star vehicles were requisitioned by the War Department, only one of which was later returned to the company. This was countered by the arrival of other second hand vehicles, including several ex-Southdown vehicles acquired from Wilts & Dorset. However, by the end of the war, much of the Silver Star fleet was in a run-down condition and needed updating.

== Post World War II ==
In 1947 Silver Star purchased its first brand new double decker, a Leyland Titan PD1. The fleet continued to be augmented by second hand vehicles, enabling some of the life-expired pre-war vehicles to be withdrawn from service.

The 1950s saw a significant expansion of weekend forces' leave services, with Silver Star vehicles travelling as far afield as Scotland and South Wales. This required a significant expansion of the coach fleet, these being mainly based on Leyland chassis with bodywork by Harrington. In April 1956 one of these vehicles was involved in a fatal accident near Rugby whilst returning from Newcastle-upon-Tyne. The coach returned to service after receiving a replacement body.

In 1957, Silver Star were granted a licence for a new express service from the Bemerton Heath housing estate in Salisbury to Porton Down, leading to the purchase of three new one-man operated single deck buses. In 1959 they became the first independent bus operator in England to place an example of the new Leyland Atlantean rear-engined double decker bus into service, this being joined by three others over the next three years.

== Takeover and fleet dispersal ==
In October 1962, one of the two founders died, and the other had already decided to retire. Silver Star Motor Services was taken over by Wilts & Dorset in June 1963 (at which time the fleet comprised 23 vehicles). They retained and used some of the ex-Silver Star vehicles for several years afterwards, but many were quickly passed on to other fleets including Bristol Omnibus and Western National.

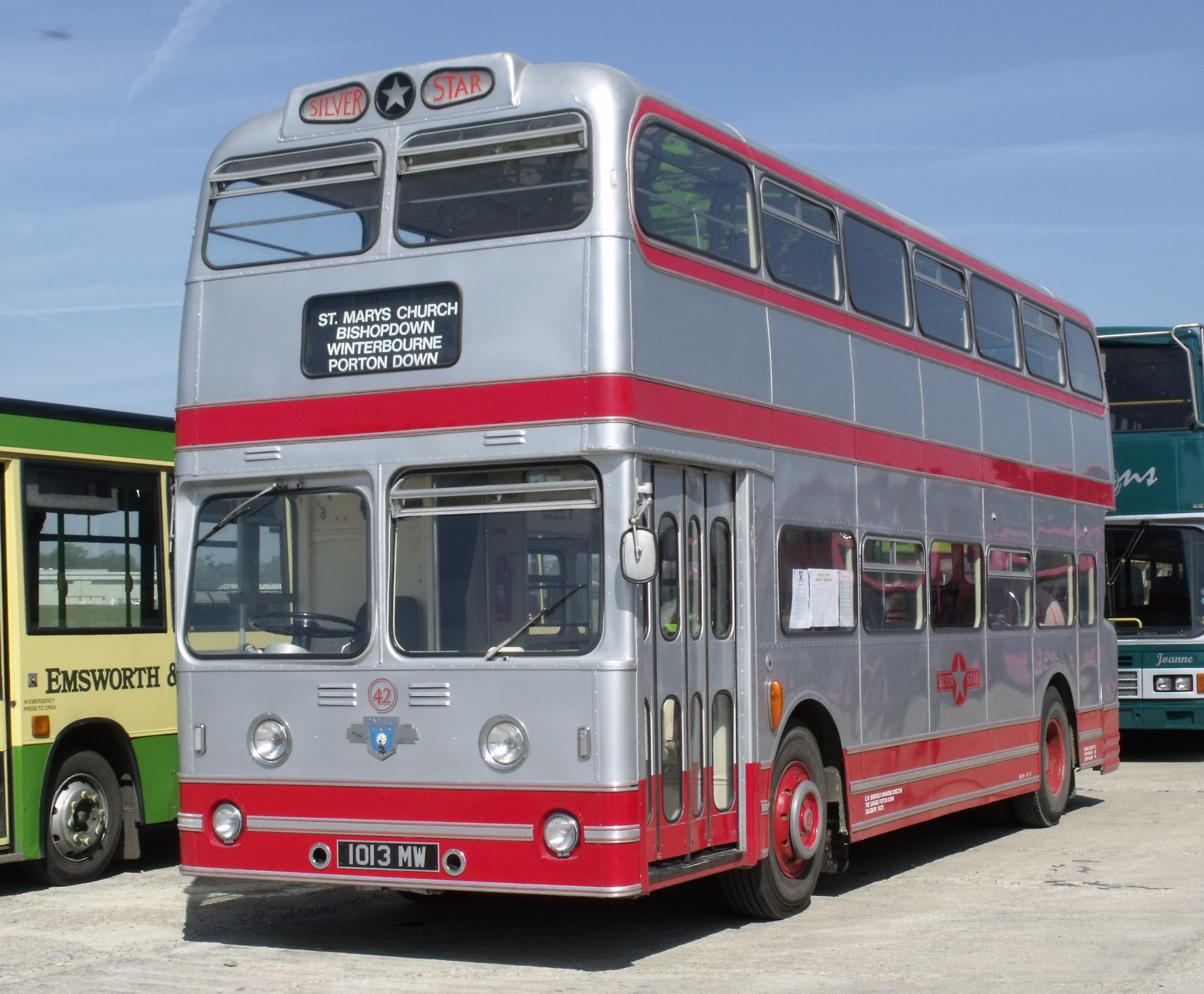
Preserved ex-Silver Star Leyland Atlantean

== Preservation ==
Three former Silver Star vehicles have been preserved and are often seen at bus rallies in the UK. These include two Leyland Tiger Cubs, as well as one of the Leyland Atlantean double decker buses.
