= Bath Festival of Children's Literature =

Annual book festival held in Bath, Somerset, UK

The Bath Children's Literature Festival (also known as Bath Kids' Lit Fest) is an annual book festival held in Bath, Somerset aimed at children's books. The festival features a variety of authors, poets, illustrators and storytellers. It typically lasts ten days in September, spanning two weekends. Various events are organised in the city during this time, as well as events at local schools in the central week. The BBC have called the largest event of its type in Europe. The Festival has been organised by John and Gill McLay since its creation in 2007. The Festival has attracted a wealth of popular and talented guests, including the Children's Laureate Michael Rosen, Jacqueline Wilson, Chris Riddell, Cressida Cowell and Alice Oseman.

== History ==
The Bath Children's Literature Festival was founded in 2007 by John and Gill McLay, who run a literary agency, and are the festival's artistic directors. In 2024 the BBC called the festival the largest event of its type in Europe. The festival typically last ten days in September, spanning two weekends, and in 2024 involved more than 80 events.

The 2015 event featured Julian Clary and new Children's Laureate Chris Riddell. In 2022, Alice Oseman, Juno Dawson, Richard Ayoade, illustrator Tor Freeman and Rosie Jones all appeared.

The 2024 festival began with a giveaway of a thousand books to local children, hosted by author Katherine Rundell. Organisers planned to give away five thousand books during the course of the festival. Other featured authors included Michael Rosen, Cressida Cowell, Rob Biddulph, and Jacqueline Wilson, who has appeared at multiple of the Bath festivals over the years.

In 2025 the festival announced a new collaboration with Longleat.
