= Goldstar shoes =

Shoe brand from Nepal

GoldStar Shoes
- Type: Private
- Industry: Footwear
- Founded: 1970; 56 years ago
- Founder: Noor Pratap Rana
- Headquarters: Maharajganj, Nepal
- Website: goldstarshoes.com

Goldstar shoes (Nepali:गोल्ड स्टार जुत्ता) is a brand of shoe produced in Nepal. The shoe is popularly tied with the Maoist insurgency in Nepal that continued for a decade. During the civil war, simply wearing a pair of Goldstar shoes was enough to land someone in prison accused of being part of the rebel force due to their easy availability and low cost. Segment of Production. 1.PVC Shoes. 2.PU Shoes. 3.G10 Shoes. During the war, the army opted to starve the rebels by imposing a blockade that deprived Maoist strongholds of both food and footwear- the Goldstar shoes.

The Goldstar brand was initiated by Noor Pratap Rana in mid-1970s as a family business. It is manufactured by Kiran Shoe Manufacturers which produce about 75000 shoes per day. The brand has been marketed in India, Australia and Malaysia, among other countries. Due to the popularity of the shoes, many fake shoes are also produced locally with the same name. The shoes have various showrooms in all major city and towns of Nepal.
