= Salisbury Reds (bus company) =

British bus operator

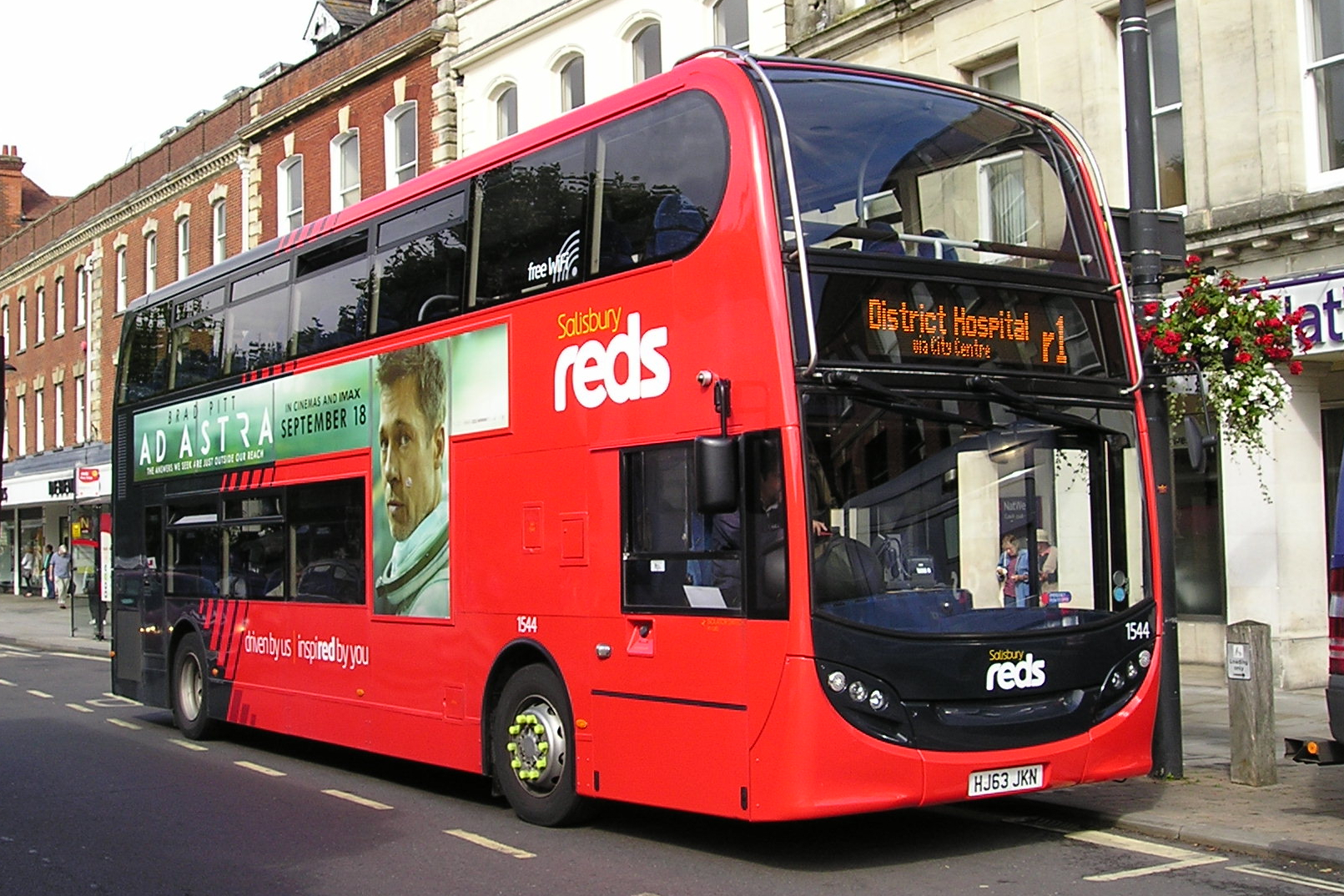
- Alexander Dennis Enviro400 in 2019
- Parent: Go-Ahead Group
- Founded: 2010
- Headquarters: Poole
- Locale: Wiltshire
- Service type: Bus services
- Destinations: Salisbury; Southampton; Swindon; Devizes; Andover; Shaftesbury
- Operator: Go South Coast
- Chief executive: Ben Murray (Interim)
- Website: www.salisburyreds.co.uk

Salisbury Reds is a trading name of bus operator Go South Coast primarily used in the Salisbury and surrounding Wiltshire areas. It is part of the Go-Ahead Group. Operations in the area were formerly part of the Wilts & Dorset brand, phased out from 2012 onwards.

== History ==
Salisbury Reds bus services centre on the Salisbury and Amesbury areas formerly operated under the Wilts & Dorset name. The brand was initially introduced in 2010 as a subbrand on Wilts & Dorset routes in the city of Salisbury. It was later expanded to most routes across Wiltshire.

In January 2014, the bus stations at Salisbury and Amesbury were closed to the public and the stops moved to roads outside the stations, with the then Salisbury Reds' operations director Ed Wills saying "We would rather preserve jobs and services than spend a fortune upgrading facilities that are being used by only a small number of our customers".

The company celebrated the centenary of Wilts & Dorset in 2015 by repainting some of its buses into its pre-war and post-war liveries. The operation had a livery redesign in February 2019. This was alongside an order for three new electric buses to be placed on two Salisbury park and ride routes (PR9 and PR15). These buses arrived in February 2020.

In March 2024, Go South Coast and Wiltshire County Council made a successful bid for 23 new electric buses, as part of the UK government's 'ZEBRA' scheme. This represents an investment of £11.4 million. As part of this, the Salisbury bus depot will be modernised to support these vehicles. This will be completed by February 2026. A further £3.5m bid for 7 more electric buses was won in April 2025; these buses are to be placed on service X4 between Salisbury and Larkhill.

== Services ==
=== Salisbury Reds ===
Salisbury Reds spans approximately 50 public service routes, covering Andover in the east, Shaftesbury in the west and Swindon in the north, as well as some closed school services.

=== Salisbury Park and Ride ===
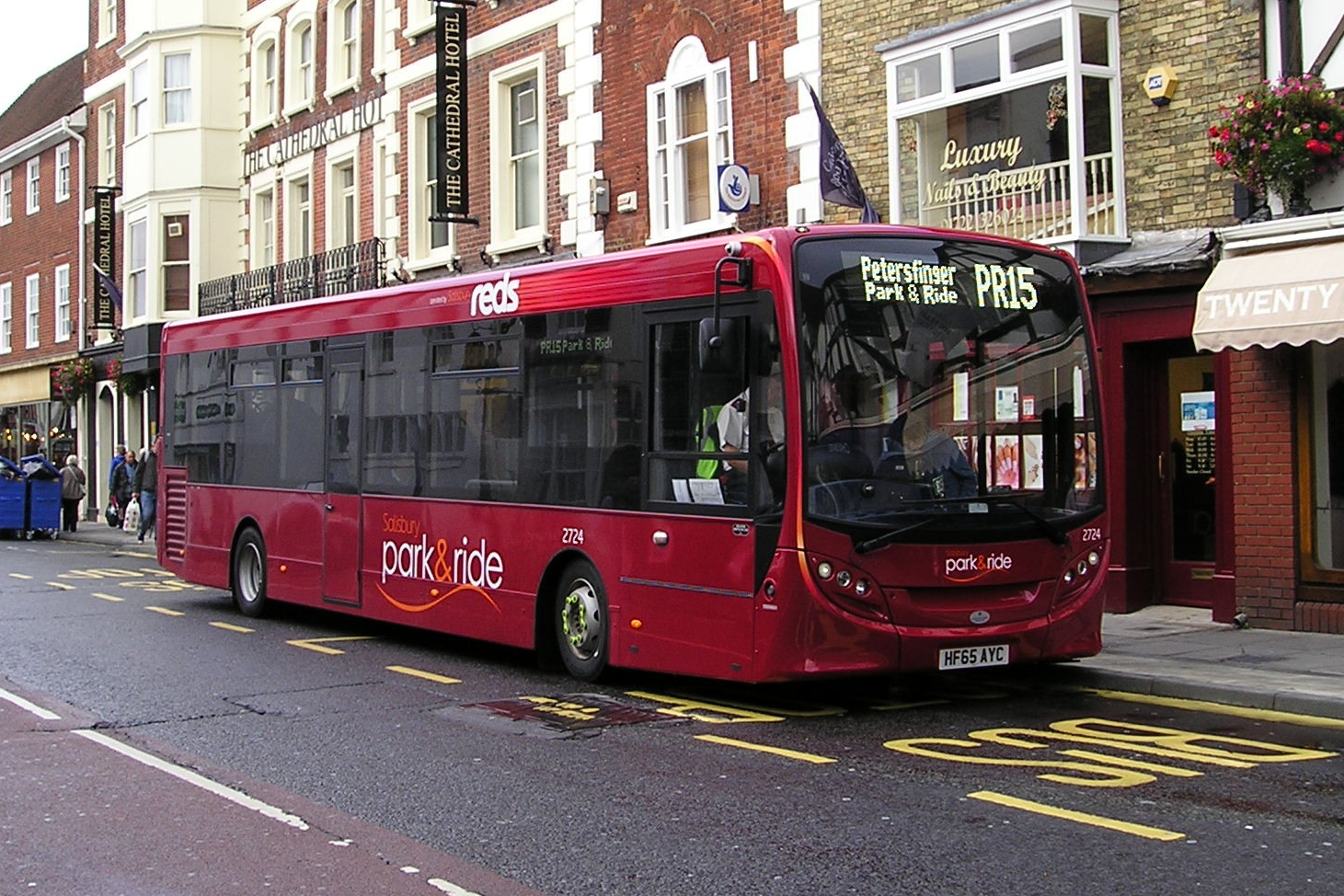
Park and Ride bus, operating 'PR15' in 2015

The Salisbury Park and Ride service began operation in March 2001 to one park and ride site, Beehive, to the north of Salisbury city centre. A second site was opened at Wilton in 2005, and two more followed, taking the total to four. A fifth site was later opened at Petersfinger, to the south-east of the city.

Initially, the routes used Optare Excels in a light green and white livery. In 2005, these were replaced by new Volvo B7RLEs, also in green and white; for a short period in late 2004, the service was operated using 'more' branded B7RLEs.

In February 2011, Wilts & Dorset lost the contract to operate the Salisbury Park and Ride network to independent operator Hatts Travel. In August 2014, due to the collapse of the Hatts group, the park & ride contract was handed back to Salisbury Reds for Wiltshire Council.

=== Activ8 ===
- 8: Salisbury – Boscombe Down – Amesbury – Tidworth – Andover

Activ8 is a joint tri-hourly service between Salisbury and Andover via Tidworth, operated in partnership with Stagecoach South and supported by Wiltshire and Hampshire County Councils. The brand was launched in February 2007. Salisbury Reds services primarily use specially branded Alexander Dennis Enviro400 MMCs on the route, having previously used Alexander Dennis Enviro400s, Scania OmniCitys and Optare Spectras.

=== Morebus X3 ===
- X3: Salisbury - Fordingbridge - Ringwood - Bournemouth

X3 is a service that operates between Salisbury and Bournemouth via Downton, Fordingbridge and Ringwood. It was extended to serve Salisbury Railway Station beginning on 24 May 2025 as part of a £5.8m plan to revamp the forecourt of the rail station.

=== The Stonehenge Tour ===
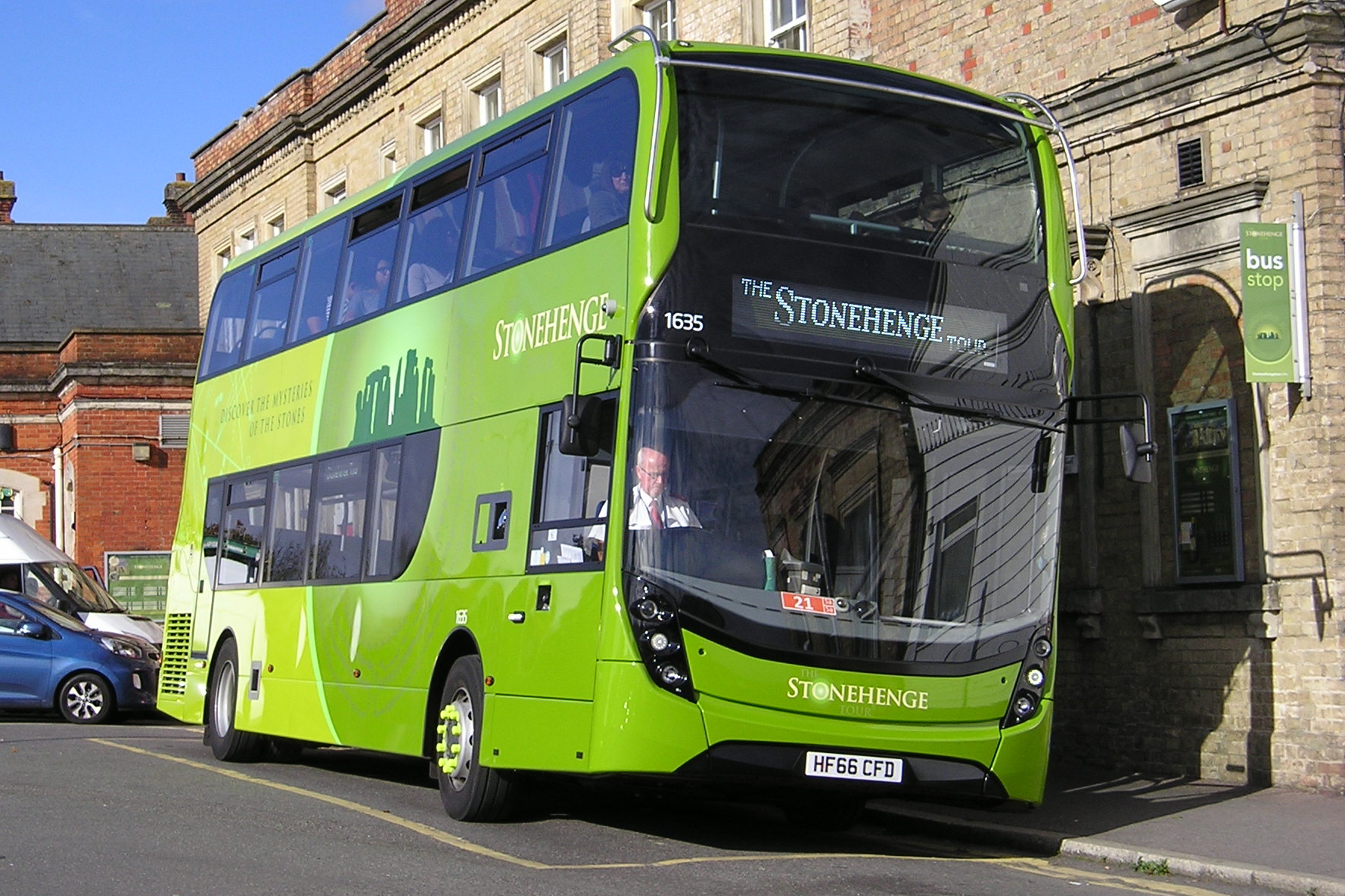
ADL Enviro400 MMC in Stonehenge Tour livery in Salisbury in October 2016

The Stonehenge Tour was rebranded in 2008, linking Salisbury railway station, the city centre, and Stonehenge. A recorded commentary describes the views along the length of the route. The tour was operated by Wilts & Dorset Optare Spectras, but is now operated using a combination of Alexander Dennis Enviro400 MMC and Alexander Dennis Enviro200 MMC vehicles, which have been specially painted in a New Stonehenge Tour Livery.

=== Little Reds ===
Since November 2025, Salisbury Reds have operated nine Mellor Strata Ultra buses on their 25, 26, 27, 29 and 37 services during the day and the R2, PR3 and R5 at dusk. The vehicles boast Euro 6 diesel engines as standard, and onboard visual and audio next stop announcement systems.

== See also ==
- List of bus operators of the United Kingdom
- Wilts & Dorset
