= Golden Star (carambola) =

Carambola cultivar

Golden Star is a carambola (Averrhoa carambola) cultivar that was developed at the Tropical Research and Education Center of the Florida Agricultural Experiment Station (FAES), an agricultural research program of the University of Florida's Institute of Food and Agricultural Sciences.

The cultivar was released from the FAES in 1965.

The Golden Star carambola is now used as a main source of rootstocks for high-pH, calcareous soils.
