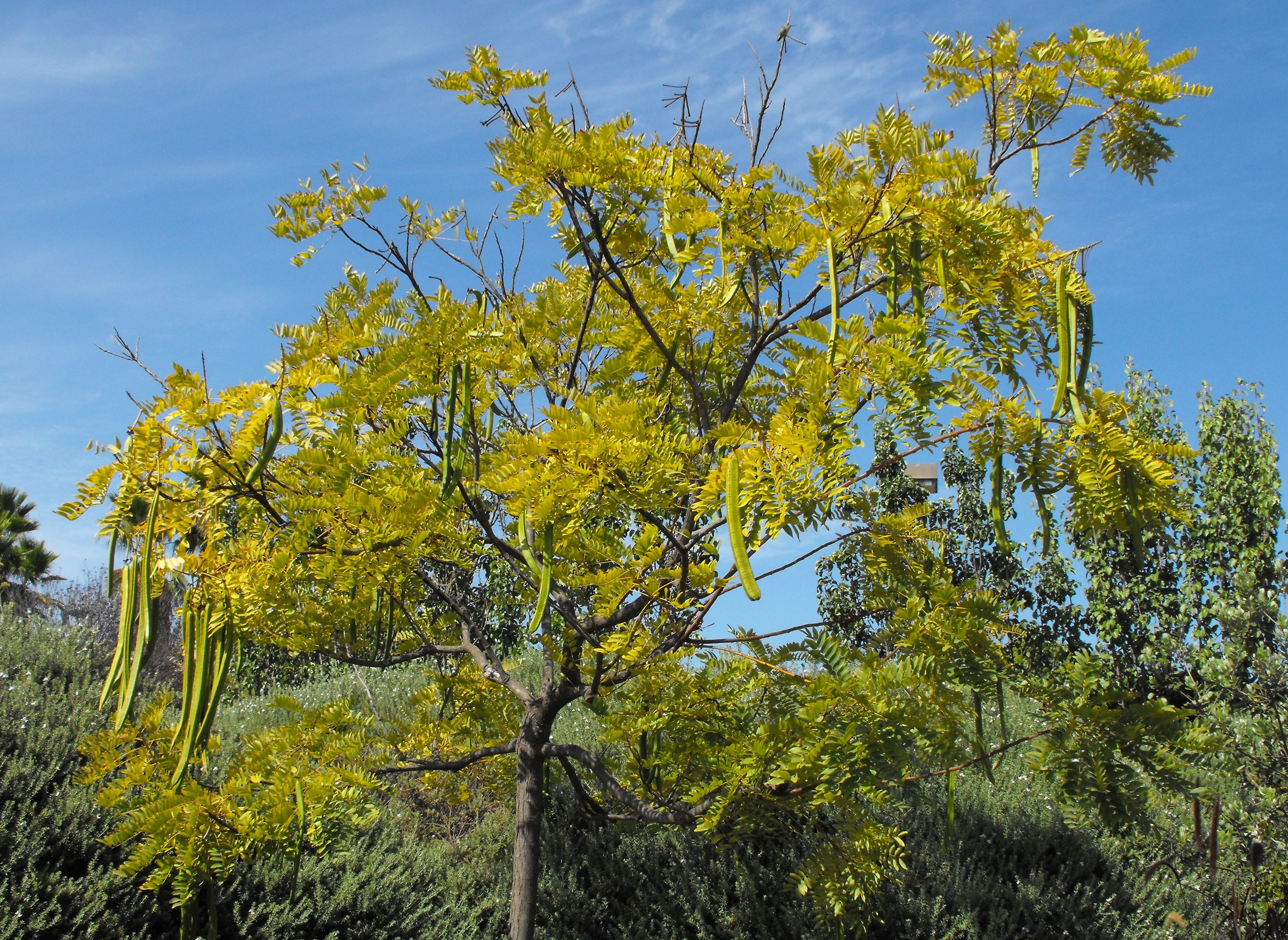

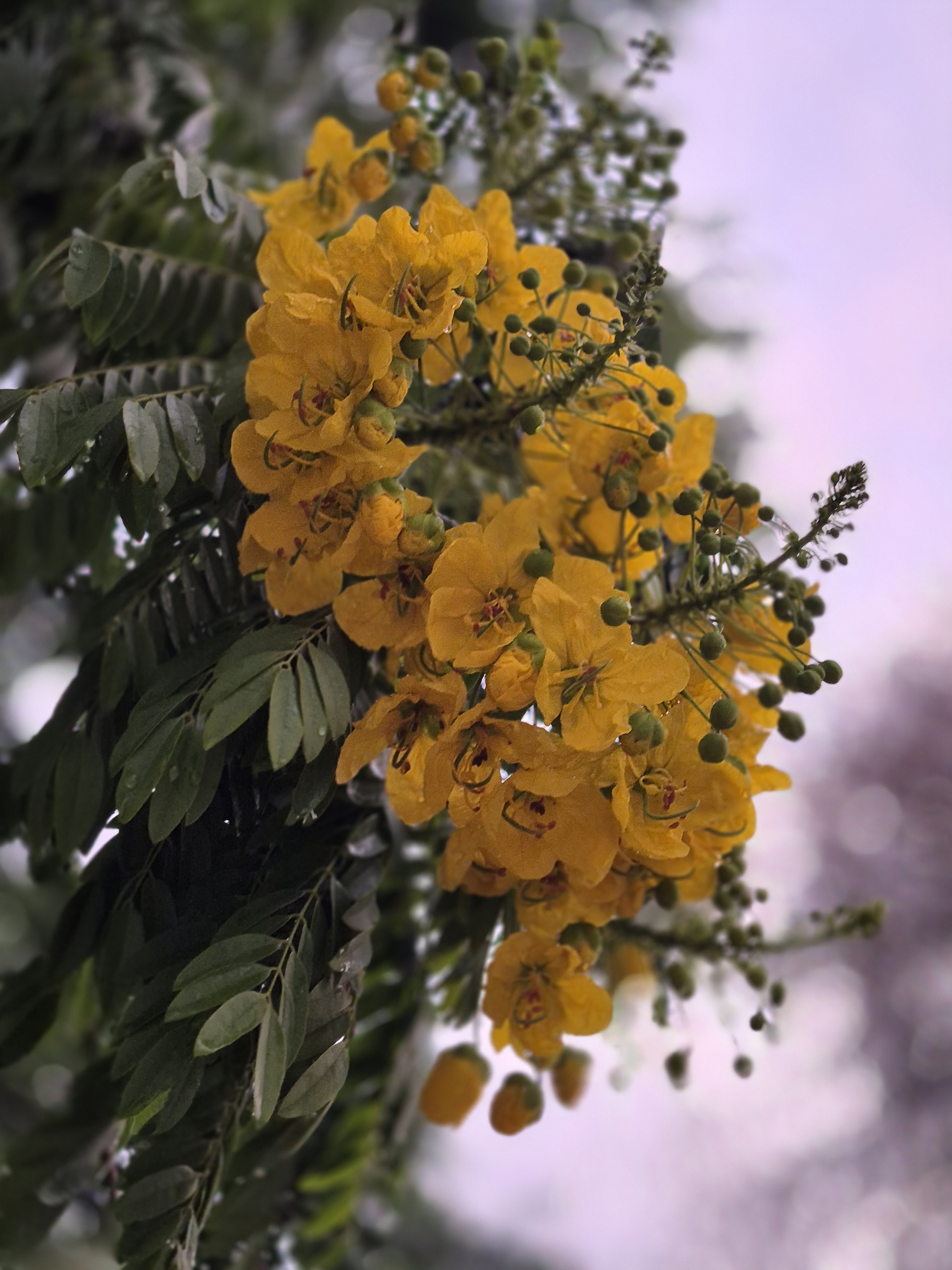

Conservation status
- Least Concern (IUCN 3.1)

Scientific classification
- Kingdom: Plantae
- Clade: Tracheophytes
- Clade: Angiosperms
- Clade: Eudicots
- Clade: Rosids
- Order: Fabales
- Family: Fabaceae
- Subfamily: Caesalpinioideae
- Genus: Cassia
- Species: C. leptophylla

Binomial name
- Cassia leptophylla Vogel

= Cassia leptophylla =

Species of legume

Cassia leptophylla is a tropical tree species in the genus Cassia, which is indigenous to Brazil. It is named gold medallion tree and has yellow flowers that bloom intermittently throughout the year, spawning seedpods that are rectangular in cross section and rattle festively. It is recognized by its thin green foliage with glossy green pinnate leaflets. The fruit is a long thin seedpod with four sides.

== Native distribution ==
Cassia leptophylla is native to southeastern Brazil.

== Uses ==
This tree does not have many uses, except as a decorative tree or as a laxative, something common to the genus Cassia.

== Warning ==
Seeds are poisonous if ingested. Parts of the plant are poisonous if ingested.

== Gallery ==
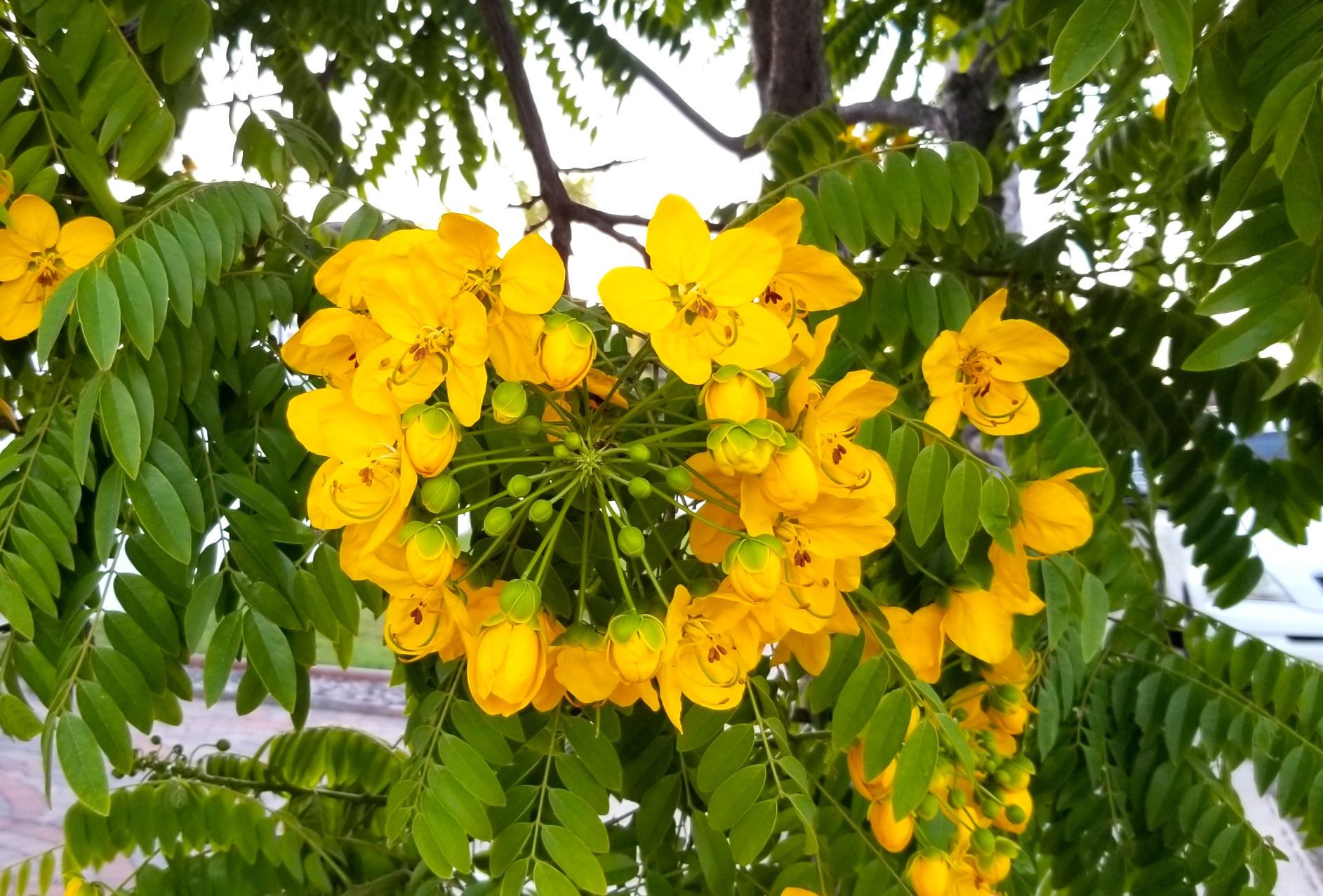
Cassia leptophylla flowers

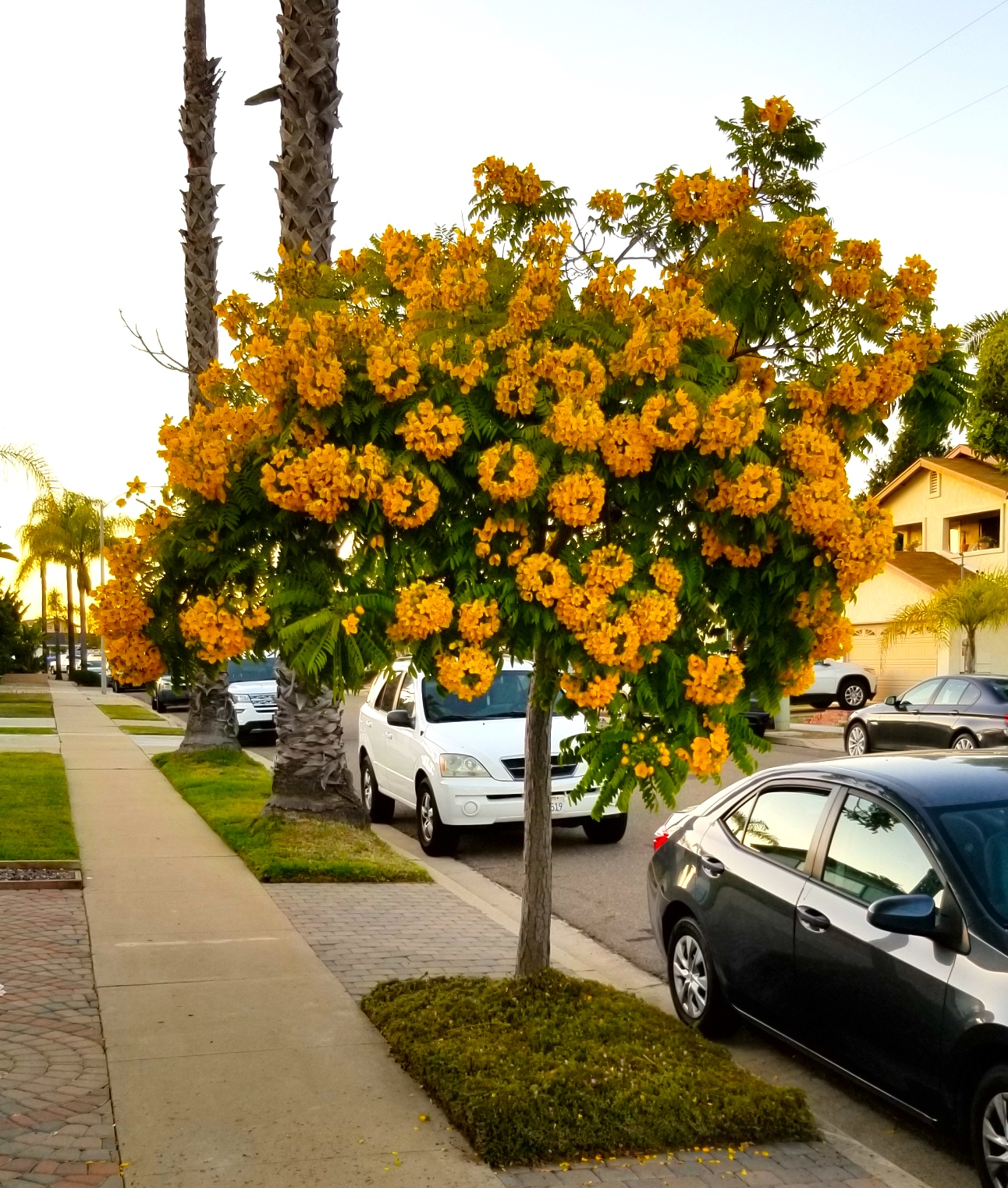
Cassia leptophylla tree
