= Gold medal =

Medal awarded for first place or a high achievement

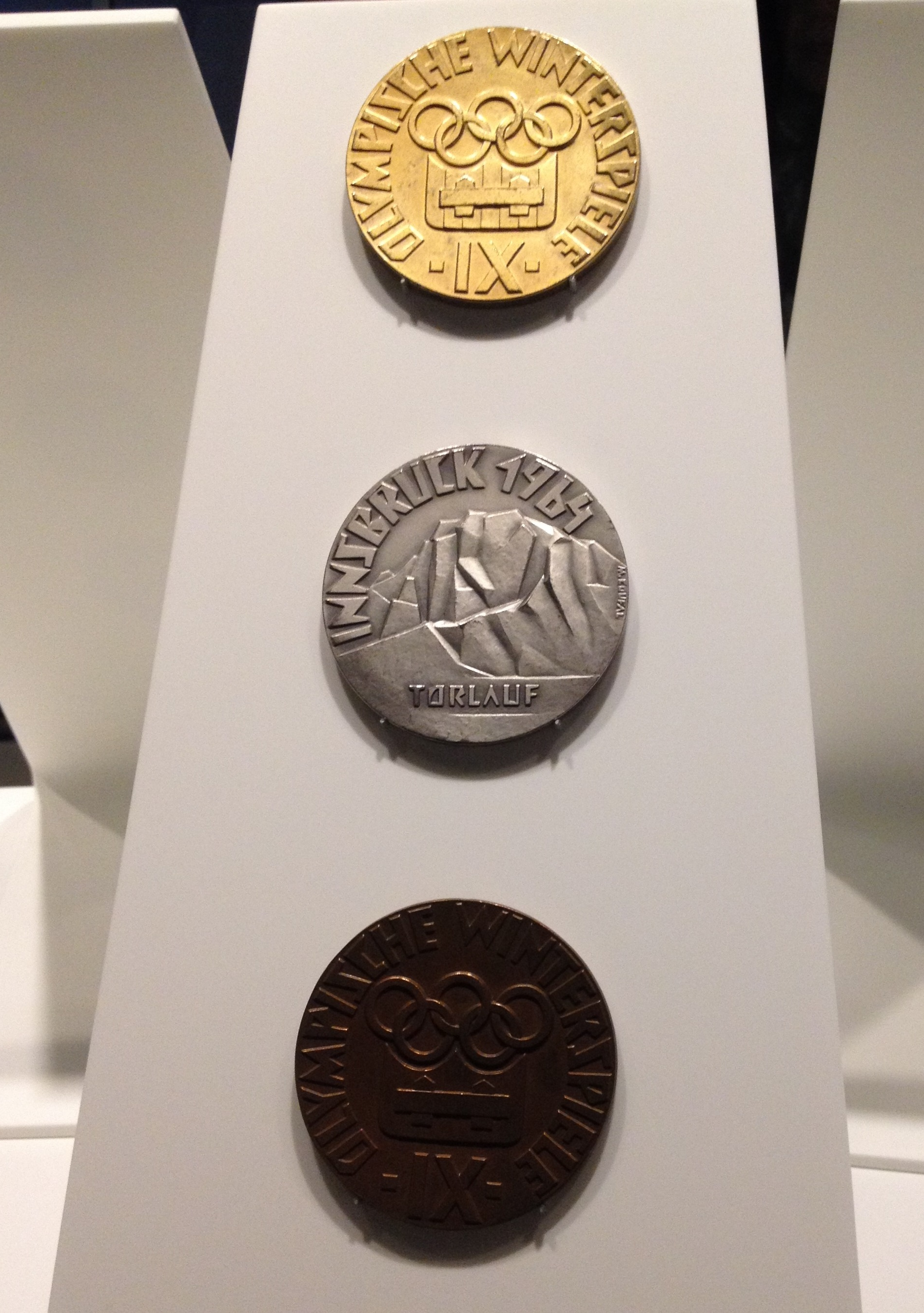
The gold, silver and bronze medals of the 1964 Olympic Winter Games (Olympic Museum).

A gold medal is a medal awarded for highest achievement in a non-military field. Its name derives from the use of at least a fraction of gold in form of plating or alloying in its manufacture.

Since the eighteenth century, gold medals have been awarded in the arts, for example, by the Royal Danish Academy of Fine Arts, usually as a symbol of an award to give an outstanding student some financial freedom. Others offer only the prestige of the award. Many organizations now award gold medals either annually or extraordinarily, including various academic societies.

While some gold medals are solid gold, others are gold-plated or silver-gilt, like those of the Olympic Games, the Lorentz Medal, the United States Congressional Gold Medal and the Nobel Prize medal. Nobel Prize medals consist of 18 karat green gold plated with 24 karat gold. Before 1980, they were struck in 23 karat gold.

== Military origins ==
Before the establishment of standard military awards, e.g., the Medal of Honor, it was common practice to have a medal specially created to provide national recognition for a significant military or naval victory or accomplishment. In the United States, Congress would enact a resolution asking the President to reward those responsible. The commanding officer would receive a gold medal and his officers would get silver medals.

== Competition medals ==
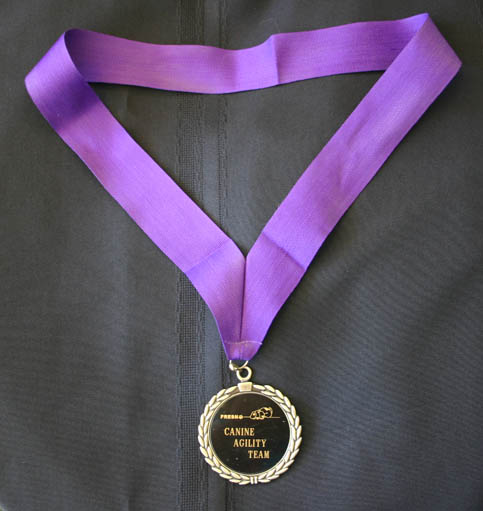
A medal on a ribbon designed to be worn around the winner's neck.

Medals have historically been given as prizes in various types of competitive activities, especially athletics.

Traditionally, medals are made of the following metals:

1. Gold (or another yellow metal, e.g., brass)
2. Silver (or another grey metal, e.g., steel)
3. Bronze

Rarely, Platinum medals can also be awarded.

These metals designate the first three Ages of Man in Greek mythology: the Golden Age, when men lived among the gods, the Silver Age, where youth lasted a hundred years, and the Bronze Age, the era of heroes.

The custom of awarding the sequence of gold, silver, and bronze medals for the first three highest achievers dates from at least the 19th century, with the National Association of Amateur Athletes in the United States awarding such medals as early as 1884.

This standard was adopted for Olympic competition at the 1904 Summer Olympics in St. Louis. At the 1896 event, silver was awarded to winners and bronze to runners-up, while in 1900 other prizes were given, not medals.

== Olympic Games ==
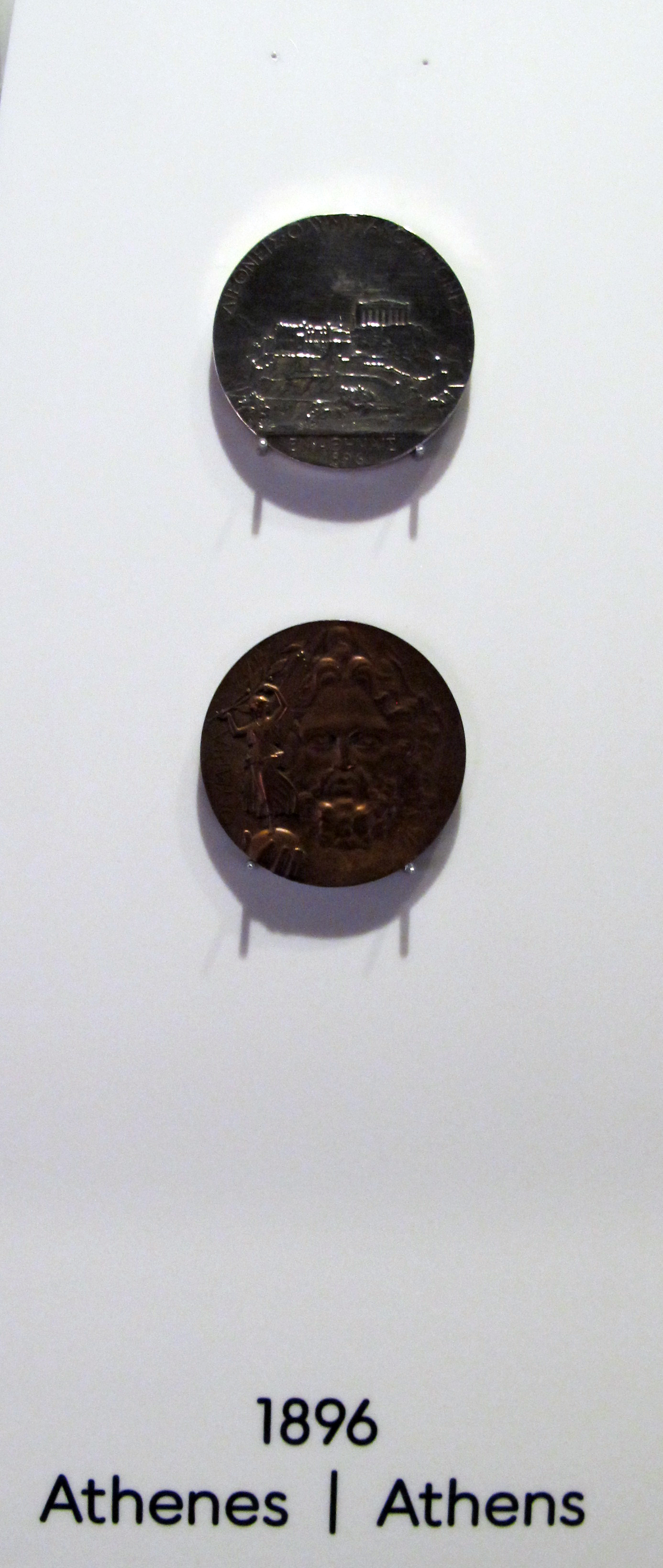
At the 1896 Summer Olympics, the winners received a silver medal. Since 1904, the winners receive a gold medal, the second-place finishers receive a silver medal and the third-place finishers receive a bronze medal.

At the modern Olympic Games, winners of a sporting discipline receive a gold medal in recognition of their achievement.

At the Ancient Olympic Games, only one winner per event received an award, which was a kotinos, an olive wreath made of wild olive leaves from a sacred tree near the temple of Zeus at Olympia. Aristophanes in Plutus makes a remark why victorious athletes are crowned with wreaths made of wild olive instead of gold. Herodotus describes a story that explains why there were only a few Greek men at the Battle of Thermopylae since "all other men were participating in the Olympic Games" and that the prize for the winner was "an olive-wreath". When Tigranes, an Armenian general, learned this, he uttered to his leader: "Good heavens! What kind of men are these against whom you have brought us to fight? Men who do not compete for possessions, but for honour".

At the 1896 Summer Olympics, winners received a silver medal and the second-place finisher received a bronze medal. In 1900, most winners received cups or trophies instead of medals. The next three Olympics (1904, 1908, 1912) awarded the winners solid gold medals, but the medals themselves were smaller. The use of gold rapidly declined with the onset of the First World War and also with the onset of the Second World War. The last series of Olympic medals to be made of solid gold were awarded at the 1912 Summer Olympics in Stockholm, Sweden.

Olympic gold medals are required to be made from at least 92.5% silver, and must contain a minimum of 6 grams of gold. All Olympic medals must be at least 70mm in diameter and 3mm thick. Minting the medals is the responsibility of the Olympic host. From 1928 through 1968 the design was always the same: the obverse showed a generic design by Florentine artist Giuseppe Cassioli of Greek goddess Nike with Rome's Colosseum in the background and text naming the host city; the reverse showed another generic design of Nike saluting an Olympic champion.

From the 1972 Summer Olympics through 2000, Cassioli's design (or a slight modification) remained on the obverse with a custom design by the host city on the reverse. Noting that Cassioli's design showed a Roman amphitheater for what originally were Greek games, a new obverse design was commissioned for the 2004 Summer Olympics in Athens. For the 2008 Beijing Olympics medals had a diameter of 70mm and were 6mm thick, with the front displaying a winged figure of victory and the back showed a Beijing Olympics symbol surrounded by an inset jade circle.

Winter Olympics medals have been of more varied design. The silver and bronze medals have always borne the same designs.

== Other gold medal awards ==
The award of a gold medal, often coupled with the award of silver and bronze medals to the next place finishers, has been adopted in other sports competitions (such as the Dr.M.A Wazed Miah Gold Medal ,Mediterranean Games), and in other competitive fields, such as music and writing, as well as some competitive games. Typically bronze medals are awarded only to third place, but in some contests there is some variety, such as International barbershop music contests where bronze medals are awarded for third, fourth, and fifth place.

== See also ==
- List of gold medal awards
