= Golden Star Festival =

The Golden Star Festival or the Bathing Festival is a festival held in Tibet falling between the 7th and 8th month of the Tibetan Calendar (August–September).

The Golden Star festival is held to wash away sins, particularly passion, greed and jealousy and to abandon ego. Ritual bathing in rivers takes place and picnics are held.

== Sources ==
- Passport Books:Tibet (1986), Shangri-La Press
