= Medallion (disambiguation) =

Medallion or Medallions may refer to:

- Medal (shortening of "medallion"), a carved or engraved circular piece of metal issued as a souvenir, award, work of art or fashion accessory
- Medallion (architecture), a large round or oval ornament on a building or monument
- Medallion (food), a circular slice of meat

== Entertainment ==
- "Medallion" (The Secret Circle), episode of the series The Secret Circle
- Medallion (film), the original title of the 2012 film Stolen
- Medallions (book), a short story collection by Zofia Nałkowska
- The Medallion, a 2003 action film
- Medallion Records (1919–1921), a record label

== Transportation ==
- Medallion Air, a Romanian charter airline
- Eagle Medallion, an automobile built by Renault for AMC and later Chrysler, 1987–1989
- "Medallion taxi", a type of taxi that uses the below taxi medallion permit
  - Taxi medallion, a permit granted by government in some cities, such as New York, to operate a vehicle for hire

== Other uses ==
- Medallion silvertip nudibranch, a species of sea slug
- Medallion Fund, a hedge fund managed by Renaissance Technologies
- Medallion signature guarantee, a special signature guarantee for the transfer of securities in the United States
- Medallion Shield, a rugby union competition for schools in Ulster
- POM-3 "Medallion", a Russian anti-personnel mine
- The Medallions, a singing group
