= Award (disambiguation) =

An award is a formal recognition.

Award also may refer to:

== Honorable distinctions ==
- Industrial award, a distinction in Australian labour law
- Medal, an object struck to be given as an award (for example, the Medal of Honor)
- Order (distinction), a distinction awarded by a sovereign state, monarch, dynastic royal house, or organization to a recipient, typically in recognition of individual merit
- Prize, a reward given to a person or group to recognize and reward actions or achievements (for example, a Nobel Prize or Pulitzer Prize)

== Legal ==
- Child custody award
- Civil-court award, a payout to the victor, also known as damages

== Media ==
- The Award (novel), a 2025 novel by Matthew Pearl

== See also ==
- Award Software
- Lists of awards
