= Bronze Medal (disambiguation) =

A bronze medal is awarded to the third-place finisher of contests or competitions, usually in sports.

Bronze Medal may also refer to:

== Awards ==
- Bronze Medal of Military Valor, an Italian medal for gallantry
- Bronze Medal for Merit, awarded by the President of the Republic of South Africa
- Bronze Medal for Civil Valor, an Italian medal for civic virtue
- Bronze Medal of Valor (American), awarded by the United States Civil Air Patrol
- CNRS Bronze Medal, awarded by the French National Centre for Scientific Research
- Congressional Bronze Medal, awarded by the United States Congress
- Department of Commerce Bronze Medal, awarded by the United States Department of Commerce
- Dufferin Bronze Medal, a British commendation to Canadian students and athletes
- Home Guard Bronze Medal, a Swedish reward medal

== Other ==
- "The Bronze Medal", a song by Idlewild from the 2000 album 100 Broken Windows
