= The MegaMix =

Compilation album by Lil Suzy
- Released: 1999-2000
- Recorded: 1991–2000
- Genre: Freestyle, Eurodance
- Length: 62:22

Alternative cover
- Best of... Nonstop mixed

The MegaMix is Lil Suzy's first compilation album launched on 30 November 1999 by the Metropolitan Recording Corporation. Includes several mixes of her hits as well as re-recorded songs in a non-stop mix.

The song "You're the Only One" was released as a single to promote the album. On 5 October 2000, the album was released in Germany under the name of Best of ... (Non-stop Mixed) and was released the same year with an identical track listing.

== Track listing ==
1. "You're the Only One" (2:50)
2. "Promise Me" (2:17)
3. "Just Can't Get Over You" (2:40)
4. "The Way I Love You" (2:30)
5. "Now & Forever" (3:29)
6. "Memories" (3:33)
7. "Take Me Back" (2:58)
8. "I Still Love You" (4:10)
9. "Everytime I Dream" (2:50)
10. "When I Fall In Love" (4:19)
11. "Do You Want to Ride" (3:04)
12. "Can't Get You Out of My Mind" (2:56)
13. "I Want Your Love" (2:15)
14. "Lies" (2:57)
15. "The Nite" (3:37)
16. "Take Me In Your Arms (2000)" (4:07)
17. "You're the Only One" (4:04)
18. "Till the End of Time (Remake)" (4:15)
19. "Real Love (Remake)" (3:31)
