= List of Billboard number-one electronic albums of 2004 =

These are the albums that reached number one on the Billboard Dance/Electronic Albums chart in 2004.

== Chart history ==
Key
| † | Indicates best-performing album of 2004 |

| Issue date | Album | Artist | Reference |
|---|---|---|---|
| January 3 | Remixed | Sarah McLachlan | |
| January 10 | Remixed | Sarah McLachlan | |
| January 17 | Remixed | Sarah McLachlan | |
| January 24 | Remixed | Sarah McLachlan | |
| January 31 | Legion of Boom | The Crystal Method | |
| February 7 | Legion of Boom | The Crystal Method | |
| February 14 | Fired Up! † | Various artists | |
| February 21 | Fired Up! † | Various artists | |
| February 28 | Queer Eye for the Straight Guy | Soundtrack | |
| March 6 | Fired Up! † | Various artists | |
| March 13 | Fired Up! † | Various artists | |
| March 20 | Fired Up! † | Various artists | |
| March 27 | Fired Up! † | Various artists | |
| April 3 | Fired Up! † | Various artists | |
| April 10 | Fired Up! † | Various artists | |
| April 17 | Fired Up! † | Various artists | |
| April 24 | Fired Up! † | Various artists | |
| May 1 | Fired Up! † | Various artists | |
| May 8 | Ultra.Dance 05 | Vic Latino and David Waxman | |
| May 15 | Ultra.Dance 05 | Vic Latino and David Waxman | |
| May 22 | Ultra.Dance 05 | Vic Latino and David Waxman | |
| May 29 | Ultra.Dance 05 | Vic Latino and David Waxman | |
| June 5 | A Grand Don't Come for Free | The Streets | |
| June 12 | A Grand Don't Come for Free | The Streets | |
| June 19 | A Grand Don't Come for Free | The Streets | |
| June 26 | A Grand Don't Come for Free | The Streets | |
| July 3 | A Grand Don't Come for Free | The Streets | |
| July 10 | Involver | Sasha | |
| July 17 | Give Up | The Postal Service | |
| July 24 | Give Up | The Postal Service | |
| July 31 | Give Up | The Postal Service | |
| August 7 | Give Up | The Postal Service | |
| August 14 | Scissor Sisters | Scissor Sisters | |
| August 21 | Scissor Sisters | Scissor Sisters | |
| August 28 | Scissor Sisters | Scissor Sisters | |
| September 4 | Scissor Sisters | Scissor Sisters | |
| September 11 | Scissor Sisters | Scissor Sisters | |
| September 18 | Louie DeVito's Dance Factory Level 3 | Louie DeVito | |
| September 25 | Scissor Sisters | Scissor Sisters | |
| October 2 | Always Outnumbered, Never Outgunned | The Prodigy | |
| October 9 | Always Outnumbered, Never Outgunned | The Prodigy | |
| October 16 | Give Up | The Postal Service | |
| October 23 | Palookaville | Fatboy Slim | |
| October 30 | Give Up | The Postal Service | |
| November 6 | Give Up | The Postal Service | |
| November 13 | Remixes 81–04 | Depeche Mode | |
| November 20 | Give Up | The Postal Service | |
| November 27 | Give Up | The Postal Service | |
| December 4 | Give Up | The Postal Service | |
| December 11 | Give Up | The Postal Service | |
| December 18 | Give Up | The Postal Service | |
| December 25 | Give Up | The Postal Service | |
