= List of Latin freestyle musicians and songs =

Latin freestyle is a form of American electronic dance music of electro-funk, post-disco, Italo disco, hip-hop origins, that is popular within Latino communities. This is a list of notable freestyle music groups, musicians, songs and albums.

Contents
Artists • History (1980s • 1990s) • Albums • Compilations • References

== History ==
=== 1980s ===
Year	Artist(s)	Name	Label
1983	Shannon	"Let the Music Play"	Emergency (EMDS 6540)
1983	Stacy Lattisaw and Johnny Gill	"Block Party"	Cotillion (7 99725)
1985	Lisa Lisa & Cult Jam with Full Force	"Can You Feel the Beat"	Columbia (44–05295)
1985	Brenda K. Starr	"I Want Your Love"	Mirage
1985	Wish featuring Fonda Rae	"Touch Me (All Night Long)"	KN (KN 1001)
1986	Nu Shooz	"I Can't Wait"	Atlantic (0-86828R)
1988	Pebbles	"Mercedes Boy"	MCA (53279)

== Examples of albums ==
Year	Name	Artist(s)	Label
1987	Show Me	The Cover Girls	Fever Records
1989	We Can't Go Wrong	The Cover Girls	Capitol
1989	Love Story	Judy Torres	Profile
1994	Lovely	Jocelyn Enriquez	Classified
1995	Life Goes On	Lil Suzy	Metropolitan
1997	Te Sigo Esperando	Brenda K. Starr	Parcha

=== Compilations ===
Year	Name	Artist(s)	Label
1989	Greatest Hits	Trinere	Pandisc
1991	The Best of Stevie B	Stevie B	LMR (Lefrak-Moelis Records)
1995	Freestyle Latin Dance Hits, Vol. 2	Various Artists	K-Tel Distribution
1997	Freestyle Latin Dance Hits, Vol. 3	Various Artists	Cold Front
1999	The Hits and More	George Lamond	Robbins Entertainment

== Examples of musicians ==
- TKA (1980s–2000s)
- Trilogy (1980s–1990s)
- Nancy Martinez
- Sa-Fire (1980's-2000s)
- Denise Lopez
- Planet Patrol (1980s)
- Stevie B (1980s–2000s)
- Brenda K. Starr (1980s–2000s)
- The Cover Girls (1980s–2000s)
- Exposé (1980s–2000s)
- Lil Suzy (1990s)
- Johnny O. (1980s–2000s)
- Trinere (1980s–1990s)
- Jocelyn Enriquez (1990s–2000s)
- Lisa Lisa & Cult Jam(80s)
- K7 (1980s–2000s)
- Lisa Lisa(1980s–2000s)
- Sweet Sensation (1980s–1990s)
- George Lamond (1980s–2000s)
- Judy Torres (1980s–2000s)
- All City (1990s)
- Collage (1980s–2000s)
- Rockell (1990s–2000s)
- Spanish Fly (1990s–2000s)
- Vla Paris & Sarina (1990s)
- Collage & Denine (1990s)
- Hanson & Davis (1980s)
