= Top Dance Albums =

American record chart published by Billboard magazine

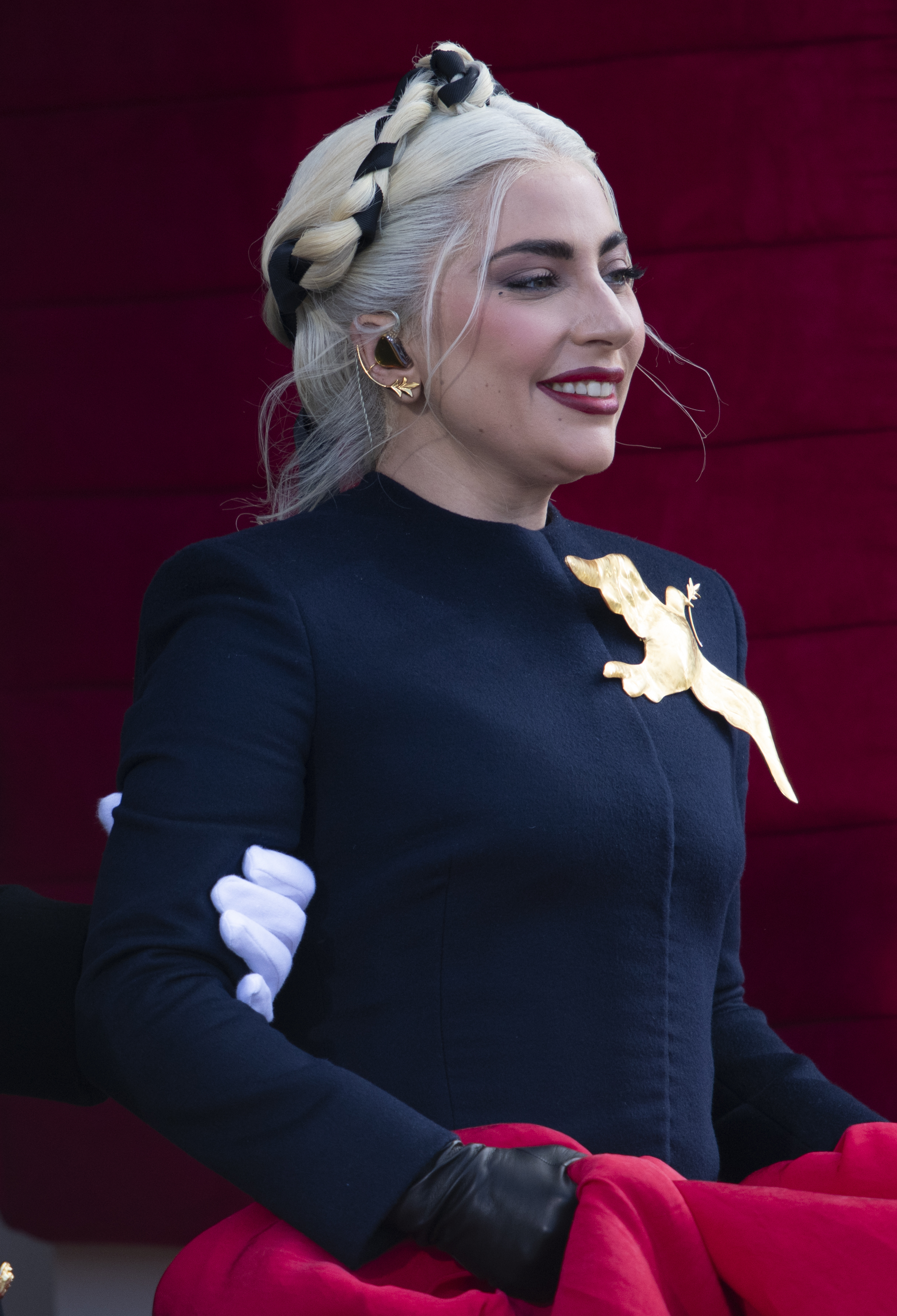
The Fame by Lady Gaga holds the record for the most weeks at number one (213 weeks) as well as the most weeks on the chart (660 weeks).

Top Dance Albums (formerly Top Electronic Albums and Top Dance/Electronic Albums) is a music chart published weekly by Billboard magazine which ranks the top-selling dance music albums in the United States based on sales compiled by Nielsen SoundScan. The chart debuted on the issue dated June 30, 2001 under the title Top Electronic Albums, with the first number-one title being the original soundtrack to the film Lara Croft: Tomb Raider. It originally began as a fifteen-position chart and has since expanded to twenty-five positions.

Top Dance Albums features full-length albums by artists who are associated with electronic dance music genres (house, techno, IDM, trance, etc.) as well as pop-oriented dance music and electronic-leaning hip hop. Also eligible for this chart are remix albums by otherwise non-electronic-based artists and DJ-mixed compilation albums and film soundtracks which feature a majority of electronic or dance music. In 2019, Billboard added a companion chart, Dance/Electronic Album Sales, which tracks the top 15 albums based solely on physical sales, but with an emphasis on core dance/electronic artists. Starting with the first full chart week of 2025, the chart was renamed to Top Dance Albums "to better represent the cross-reference of dance titles that appear on the ranking".

The current number-one album on the chart as of issue November 14 is The Fame by Lady Gaga.

== Artist milestones ==
=== Most number-one albums ===
Albums	Artist	Source
8	Lady Gaga	
7	Louie DeVito	
6	Daft Punk	
6	The Chainsmokers	
4	Aphex Twin (One as "AFX")	
4	Lindsey Stirling	
4	M.I.A.	
4	Pet Shop Boys	
4	Marshmello	
4	FKA Twigs	
4	Nine Inch Nails	
4	Illenium	
4	Madonna	

=== Most cumulative weeks at number one ===
Weeks	Artist	Source
322	Lady Gaga	
91	The Chainsmokers	
57	Beyoncé (Note: Renaissance was not classified as a Dance/Electronic album until its 16th week. Had Billboard classified it as such upon release, the album would have spent an additional 15 weeks at number one.)	
47	Gnarls Barkley	
39	Charli XCX	
38	Daft Punk	
35	Gorillaz	
32	Louie DeVito	
29	Lindsey Stirling	
23	Calvin Harris	
23	Marshmello	

=== Most entries on the chart ===
Entries	Artist	Source
33	Armin van Buuren	
23	Tiësto	
19	Louie DeVito	
18	The Happy Boys	
17	Pet Shop Boys	
16	Moby	
16	Bassnectar	
13	Bad Boy Joe	
13	David Waxman	
12	Johnny Vicious	
12	Madonna	

== Album milestones ==
=== Most weeks at number one ===
Weeks	Album	Artist	Year(s)	Source
213	The Fame	Lady Gaga	2008–26	
57	Renaissance	Beyoncé	2022–24	
46	Memories...Do Not Open	The Chainsmokers	2017–18	
39	St. Elsewhere	Gnarls Barkley	2006–07	
39	Brat	Charli XCX	2024–25	
39	Mayhem	Lady Gaga	2025	
36	Chromatica	Lady Gaga	2020–21	
34	Demon Days	Gorillaz	2005–06	
22	Random Access Memories	Daft Punk	2013–23	
20	Marshmello Fortnite Extended Set	Marshmello	2019	
20	Honestly, Nevermind	Drake	2022	

=== Most weeks on the chart ===
Weeks	Album	Artist	Source
660	The Fame	Lady Gaga	
613	Demon Days	Gorillaz	
606	Nothing but the Beat	David Guetta	
565	Random Access Memories	Daft Punk	
519	Collage	The Chainsmokers	
513	Born This Way	Lady Gaga	
472	Motion	Calvin Harris	
454	Memories...Do Not Open	The Chainsmokers	
438	18 Months	Calvin Harris	
437	Discovery	Daft Punk	
435	True	Avicii	

== Year-end number-one albums ==
List of albums that ranked number-one on the Billboard Top Dance/Electronic Albums Year-End chart.

- 2001: Pulse – Various Artists
- 2002: 18 – Moby
- 2003: N.Y.C. Underground Party 5 – Louie DeVito
- 2004: Fired Up! – Various Artists
- 2005: Demon Days – Gorillaz
- 2006: Confessions on a Dance Floor – Madonna
- 2007: St. Elsewhere – Gnarls Barkley
- 2008: Kala – M.I.A.
- 2009 and 2010: The Fame – Lady Gaga
- 2011: Born This Way – Lady Gaga
- 2012: Sorry for Party Rocking – LMFAO
- 2013: Random Access Memories – Daft Punk
- 2014: Artpop – Lady Gaga
- 2015: Listen – David Guetta
- 2016: Now That's What I Call a Workout 2016 – Various Artists
- 2017 and 2018: Memories...Do Not Open – The Chainsmokers
- 2019: Marshmello Fortnite Extended Set – Marshmello
- 2020: Chromatica – Lady Gaga
- 2021: The Fame – Lady Gaga
- 2022: Honestly, Nevermind – Drake
- 2023: Renaissance – Beyoncé
- 2024 and 2025: Brat – Charli XCX
