= Back to Dance =

Studio album by Lil Suzy
- Released: January 11, 1994
- Recorded: 1993
- Genre: Freestyle
- Length: 46:15
- Label: Warlock Records
- Producer: Tony Garcia, Mauro P. DeSantis, Victor Franco

Lil Suzy chronology
Love Can't Wait (1991)	Back to Dance (1994)	Life Goes On (1995)

Back to Dance is Lil Suzy's second studio album.

== Production ==
It was released on 1994.

== Track listing ==
No.	Title	Lyrics	Length
1.	"Turn the Beat Around"	Gerald Jackson/Pete Jackson	3:52
2.	"Till the End of Time"	Michael Anthony Bertot/Victor Franco	4:18
3.	"Real Love"	Stephanie Friedman/Tony "Dr. Edit" Garcia	3:55
4.	"Work"	Stephanie Friedman/Tony "Dr. Edit" Garcia	3:32
5.	"You and Me"	T. Bradley/C. Bradley/P. Harlyn	4:13
6.	"Don't Let This Feeling End"	Paula Clarke/Victor Franco	4:05
7.	"Alone and in Love"	Victor Franco	4:22
8.	"Take Me in Your Arms" (Remix)	Tony "Dr. Edit" Garcia/Julian Hernandez/Miranda, Richard/John Romano	3:40
9.	"I Think I'm in Love"	Nancy Batista/Tony "Dr. Edit" Garcia	3:42
10.	"You're the One for Me"	Nancy Batista/Tony "Dr. Edit" Garcia	3:40
11.	"Since I've Met You"	Tony "Dr. Edit" Garcia/Julian Hernandez/John Romano	3:44
12.	"Don't Be Lonely"	Nancy Batista/Tony "Dr. Edit" Garcia	3:40
