= The Puppies =

American hip hop group

- Origin: Miami, Florida
- Genres: Hip-hop, bass
- Years active: 1991–1997
- Labels: Joey Boy Records (1991-1994); Chaos/Columbia/SME Records (1994–1996); Pandisc Records (1996–1997)
- Past members: Calvin "Big Boy" Mills III; Tamara Dee Mills

The Puppies were a child hip hop sibling duo composed of brother Calvin "Big Boy" Mills III, and sister Tamara Dee Mills.

Specializing in Miami bass music, the duo released two albums and scored one Top-40 hit on the U.S. Billboard Hot 100, "Funky Y-2-C."

== Career ==
The group was assembled in the early 1990s by Kendall-based record producer Calvin Mills II, who sought to create a young rap group with a Miami bass sound. Knowing the pressures of the music industry first-hand, Mills initially hesitated to include his own children, Calvin III and Tamara Dee, in the group. Nevertheless, the brother-and-sister duo became the Puppies and signed a recording contract with Miami-based Joey Boy Records soon after. Joey Boy issued the Puppies' first eponymous album, produced by Mills II and his brother Carlton Mills, in 1992.

The Puppies soon attracted the interest of Columbia subsidiary Chaos Recordings and were bought out of their contract with Joey Boy, signing a $400,000 deal with Chaos/Columbia. Under this contract, the duo re-released a slightly different version of their debut album along with two singles from the album in 1994. The first of the singles, "Funky Y-2-C", was released in the spring and became the duo's biggest hit, reaching the Top 40 of the Billboard Hot 100 and selling over 280,000 copies. The song's music video, featuring the Puppies performing and dancing to the song with children at a playground, a club, and on the beach, also proved popular, particularly on The Box where it was the number one video for multiple weeks. The Puppies spent the summer on tour, particularly at schools and radio-sponsored outdoor concerts where they could reach a young audience. While promoting "Funky Y-2-C", the duo frequently held video giveaways and dance contests at their shows.

After the Puppies' second single, "Summer Delight", failed to chart, the duo were dropped from the Chaos/Columbia roster, at which point their producer and father, Calvin Mills II, and prior label Joey Boy Records fought over the rights to the Puppies' material. In exchange for the right to continue to record under the name the Puppies, Mills relinquished a large sum of money along with ownership of the Puppies' prior material to Joey Boy Records. The Puppies then recorded and released Recognize in 1996 under the Miami-based Pandisc Records, supported by the single "Hokey Pokey". The Puppies performed at shows and benefits in South Florida to support the record, along with a mini-tour in Japan where the album had been issued by Cutting Edge Records.

Under Convertible Records, a partnership formed between Pandisc and Mills II in 1996 prior to the release of Recognize, the former duo's Big Boy continues to release music under the name DJ Big Boy, including occasional guest vocals from Tamara Dee.

== Discography ==
=== Albums ===
- The Puppies (Joey Boy Records, 1992)
- The Puppies (re-release) (Chaos/Columbia/SME Records, 1994) #33 Heatseekers
- Recognize (Pandisc Records, 1996)

=== Singles ===
Year	Title	Chart positions			Album
Year	Title	US	US R&B	US Rap	Album
1994	"Funky Y-2-C"	40	31	6	The Puppies
1994	"Summer Delight"	—	—	—	The Puppies
1996	"Hokey Pokey"	—	—^{[a]}	46	Recognize

Notes

- a "Hokey Pokey" did not enter the Billboard Hot R&B Singles chart, but peaked at number 11 on the Bubbling Under Hot R&B Singles chart.

=== Music videos ===
Year	Title	Director(s)
1994	"Funky Y-2-C"	Ignacio Medrano
1994	"Summer Delight"	Dwight Patillo
1996	"Hokey Pokey"	Brian Forti and Kevin Layne
