= Life Goes On (Lil Suzy album) =

Studio album by Lil Suzy
- Released: April 4, 1995
- Recorded: 1994
- Genre: Freestyle, Eurodance
- Length: 41:34
- Label: Metropolitan Recording Corporation

Lil Suzy chronology
Back to Dance (1994)	Life Goes On (1995)	Paradise (1997)

Singles from Life Goes On
- 1. "Promise Me" Released: 1994; 2. "Now & Forever" Released: May 23, 1995; 3. "When I Fall In Love" Released: October 31, 1995; 4. "Just Can't Get Over You/Lies" Released: October 15, 1996

Professional ratings
Review scores
Source	Rating
Allmusic	link

Life Goes On is Lil Suzy's third studio album, released on April 4, 1995, by Metropolitan Recording Corporation. It was her first album to release several hit singles, namely "Promise Me", which was her most successful single on the Billboard Hot 100, peaking at #62 in February 1995. "Now & Forever", Just Can't Get Over You" and "When I Fall In Love" were the other three singles, but they weren't entered in any music chart. The album is also significant for Lil Suzy's change in style towards Eurodance.

== Track listing ==
No.	Title	Lyrics	Length
1.	"Promise Me"	A. Espinet/Victor Franco	3:55
2.	"Now & Forever"	Chris Phillips/Alexia Phillips	3:41
3.	"Lies"	Victor Franco/Tito Ramirez	4:01
4.	"Just Can't Get Over You"	Victor Franco	4:33
5.	"Someone For Me"	Victor Franco	5:10
6.	"When I Fall In Love"	Chris Phillips/Alexia Phillips	3:55
7.	"Take Me Back"	Stephanie Friedman/Carlos Keyes	3:36
8.	"We'd Always Be Together"	M. DiBartolomeo/Michael Rucska	4:10
9.	"I'm Not Ready"	Dave Deberry/Peter Goldbeck/Eric Mercado	5:03
10.	"Promise Me" (Bonus Mix)	A. Espinet/Victor Franco	3:53

== Chart positions ==
Singles - Billboard (North America)

Year	Single	Chart	Position
1994	"Promise Me"	Billboard Hot 100	62
1994	"Promise Me"	Hot Dance Music/Maxi-Singles Sales	17
1994	"Promise Me"	US Rhythmic (Billboard)	26
