= Catch Me I'm Falling (album) =

Studio album by Pretty Poison
- Released: 1988
- Recorded: 1987
- Genres: Dance-pop, freestyle
- Label: Virgin
- Producers: André Cymone, Fred Zarr, Kae Williams, Jr., Kurt Shore, Deodato, Shep Pettibone

Pretty Poison chronology
Laced (1983)	Catch Me I'm Falling (1988)	Deflowered (1995)

Singles from Catch Me I'm Falling
- 1. "Catch Me (I'm Falling)" Released: August 10, 1987; 2. "Nighttime (re-recorded version)" Released: 1988; 3. "When I Look Into Your Eyes" Released: 1988

Professional ratings
Review scores
Source	Rating
AllMusic	3/5 stars

Catch Me I'm Falling is the 1988 debut album by the American dance-pop group Pretty Poison, who consisted of Jade Starling and Whey Cooler. It contains the title track "Catch Me (I'm Falling)", which was a top ten hit in the U.S. and also hit number one on the Billboard Hot Dance Club Play chart the previous year. The second single off the album was a remix of their 1984 dance hit "Nighttime", which references Whodini's 1984 song "Freaks Come Out at Night", and was a top 40 hit in May 1988. The third single, "When I Look into Your Eyes", peaked on the dance chart in September of the same year.

== Track listing ==
All tracks written by Jade Starling and Whey Cooler except where noted.

1. "Hold Me" – 5:37
2. "Nightime" – 4:17
3. "Closer" – 6:05
4. "When I Look into Your Eyes" – 4:12
5. "Let Freedom Ring" (Starling, Cooler, Bobby Corea) – 4:32
6. "Catch Me (I'm Falling)" – 4:54
7. "The Look" – 5:13
8. "Don't Cry" – 5:05
9. "Shine" – 4:42
10. "Heaven" (J. Wilson, J. Cohen, I. Gold, Starling, Cooler) – 5:04

== Personnel ==
=== Pretty Poison ===
- Jade Starling: Vocals
- Whey Cooler: Guitars, Keyboards, Electronic Percussion
- David "Kaya" Prior: Percussion (on "Nighttime" and "Catch Me, I'm Falling")

=== Additional Personnel ===
- Louie Franco, Ron Jennings, Greg Porter, Chris Arms, Greg Poree - guitars
- André Cymone - guitars, keyboards
- Kae Williams Jr., Kurt Shore, Fred Zarr, Andy Marvel, Eumir Deodato - keyboards
- Tony Romeo, Boyd Jarvis - bass
- Bobby Corea - drums
- Brian Kilgore, Bashiri Johnson, Dave Darlington, Paul Simpson - percussion
- Jimmy Zee: Saxophone
- Tenita Jordan, Carrie Johnson, Cheryl Gatson, Diane Richards, Zoe Walken, Butch Robinson, Cuca Eschevaria - backing vocals

== Production ==
- Tracks 1 & 6 Produced by Kae Williams Jr. and Kurt Shore. Recorded & Mixed by Mitch Goldfarb, with assistance on track 6 by Brooke Hendricks, Jim Campbell & Ryan Dorn.
- Tracks 2 & 7 Produced by Kae Williams Jr., with additional production and remix on track 2 by Shep Pettibone. Track 2 Recorded & Mixed by Joe Nicolo, Joe Alexander & Ryan Dorn; recording assisted by Jim Campbell & Robert Kloss. Track 7 Recorded & Mixed by Joe Alexander, Ryan Dorn & Mitch Goldfarb; recording assistance by Brooke Hendricks & Jim Campbell.
- Tracks 3, 8 & 10 Produced by André Cymone. All Tracks Recorded & Mixed by Bobby Brooks; recording assistance by Brian Conley, Brian Schueble, Steve Shelton (all tracks) & Liz Cluse (track 8).
- Tracks 4 & 9 Produced by Fred Zarr. Recorded by Don Feinberg, with assistance by Bernard Bulloch, Bill Esses & Richard Joseph. Track 4 Mixed by Michael Hutchinson. Track 9 Mixed by Don Feinberg.
- Track 5 Produced by Eumir Deodato, with remix & additional production by Paul Simpson. Recorded & Mixed by Jon Goldberger; recording assistance by Angel Ugarte.
- All Songs Published by Genetic Music, except "Heaven" (published by SBK Blackwood Music/Elastic Music/Mario Music/Genetic Music).

== Charts ==
Chart performance for Catch Me I'm Falling
Chart (1988)	Peak position
US Billboard 200	104
