= All Night (Trinere song) =

"All Night" is a song by dance-pop and freestyle singer Trinere and the second single released from the album Trinere in 1985. It reached number 68 on the U.S. R&B chart.

== Track listing ==
12" single

| No. | Title | Length |
|---|---|---|
| 1. | "All Night" | 6:20 |
| 2. | "All Night" (Remix) | 6:45 |
| 3. | "All Night" (Instrumental) | 5:00 |

== Charts ==
| Chart (1985) | Peak position |
|---|---|
| U.S. Hot Black Singles (Billboard) | 68 |
