= Can't Get You Out of My Mind =

Single by Lil Suzy

from the album Paradise
- Released: July 10, 1997
- Genre: Freestyle, eurodance
- Songwriter(s): Suzanne Casale, Adam Marano

Lil Suzy singles chronology
"Just Can't Get Over You" (1996)	"Can't Get You Out of My Mind" (1997)	"Memories" (1997)

"Can't Get You Out of My Mind" is the first single released by Lil Suzy from her fourth album, Paradise. It was released on July 10, 1997. The song reached No. 79 in the Billboard Hot 100 on August 23, 1997.

== Tracks ==
U.S.A. CD Single

No.	Title	Length
1.	"Can't Get You Out of My Mind" (Funhouse Radio)	3:34
2.	"Can't Get You Out of My Mind" (Wild Style Edit)	3:57
3.	"Can't Get You Out of My Mind" (Viper Radio)	3:33
4.	"Can't Get You Out of My Mind" (Suzy's Freestyle Edit)	3:50
5.	"Can't Get You Out of My Mind" (Funhouse Club Mix)	6:08
6.	"Can't Get You Out of My Mind" (Wild Style Mix Show)	6:08
7.	"Can't Get You Out of My Mind" (Viper Club Mix)	4:33
8.	"Can't Get You Out of My Mind" (Suzy's Freestyle Mix)	4:46
9.	"Can't Get You Out of My Mind" (Vocal Dub Club)	5:58

== Charts ==
Chart (1997)	Peak position
US Billboard Hot 100	79
US Hot Dance Music/Maxi-Singles Sales	14
