= Paradise (Lil Suzy album) =

Studio album by Lil Suzy
- Released: July 8, 1997
- Recorded: 1997
- Genre: Freestyle, Eurodance, Downtempo
- Length: 55:00
- Label: Metropolitan Recording Corporation

Paradise is Lil Suzy's fourth and final studio album to date. It was issued on 8 July 1997 by the Metropolitan Recording Corporation. It contains the singles "Can't Get You Out of My Mind" and "I Still Love You", which reached No. 79 and No. 94 on the Billboard Hot 100, respectively. The track, "You're the Only One", was later released as a single in 1999 as part of the compilation The MegaMix. Other tracks of note are "Memories", a cover of the group Netzwerk, and "Love Letter Lost", a collaboration with Crystal Waters.

== Track listing ==
No.	Title	Length
1.	"Can't Get You Out of My Mind (Remix)"	3:59
2.	"You're the Only One"	4:10
3.	"Everytime I Dream"	4:02
4.	"I Still Love You"	4:15
5.	"Memories"	3:55
6.	"Do You Want to Ride"	4:07
7.	"Erased"	3:39
8.	"Can't Get You Out of My Mind"	3:36
9.	"Love Letter Lost" (featuring Crystal Waters)	5:11
10.	"Paradise"	4:20
11.	"The Way I Love You"	3:57
12.	"The Nite"	4:04
13.	"To Be with You"	3:07
14.	"I Want Your Love"	3:06

== Charts ==
Singles - Billboard

Year	Single	Chart	Peak position
1997	"Can't Get You Out of My Mind"	Billboard Hot 100	79
1997	"Can't Get You Out of My Mind"	Hot Dance Music/Maxi-Singles Sales	14
1998	"I Still Love You"	Billboard Hot 100	94
1998	"I Still Love You"	Hot Dance Music / Maxi-Singles Sales	32
