= Tony Garcia (singer) =

Puerto Rican singer and producer

Tony Garcia, also called Dr Edit, is an American singer and record producer of Puerto Rico and Italian descent. He mainly produced Freestyle music. Garcia produced for many artists in the late 1980s through the 1990s, working with artists such as Reinald-O, Peter Fontaine, Lil Suzy, and Wickett Rich. Garcia wrote and produced "My Sweet Love" by Reinald-O in 1988. Garcia produced "Just Like the Wind" and "Another Night" which were included on the soundtrack of the telenovela Vamp. His biggest success was the production of "Take Me in Your Arms" with singer Lil Suzy, which peaked at No. 67 on the Billboard Hot 100.
