= Love Can't Wait (album) =

Studio album by Lil Suzy
- Released: November 18, 1991
- Recorded: 1991
- Genre: Freestyle
- Length: 31:34
- Label: High Power
- Producer: Tony Garcia; Mauro P. DeSantis; Bobby "Dub" Allecca; John Romano; Julian Hernandez; Victor Franco; Mike Rega; Nicholas Terzi

Lil Suzy chronology
| Love Can't Wait (1991) | Back to Dance (1993) |

Singles from Love Can't Wait
- 1. "Take Me in Your Arms" Released: 1991; 2. "Falling in Love" Released: 1992

Love Can't Wait is the debut album by American freestyle singer Lil Suzy. It was released on November 18, 1991, by High Power Records and distributed by Warlock Records. The album marks the beginning of her freestyle career with producer Tony "Dr. Edit" Garcia, president of High Power Records. "Take Me in Your Arms" became the most successful single, reaching No. 67 on the Billboard Hot 100 chart. Later came the singles "Falling in Love" and "Love Can't Wait".

== Track listing ==
| No. | Title | Writer(s) | Length |
|---|---|---|---|
| 1. | "Children of the World" | Michaelangelo Caraballo; Anthony Casale; Tony "Dr. Edit" Garcia; Eric Mercado | 3:37 |
| 2. | "Love Can't Wait" | Victor Franco | 4:05 |
| 3. | "True Love" | Julian Hernandez; John Romano | 4:13 |
| 4. | "Sweet September Love" | Mike Rega; Nicholas Terzi | 4:03 |
| 5. | "Falling in Love" | Tony "Dr. Edit" Garcia; Julian Hernandez; John Romano | 3:53 |
| 6. | "Honestly in Love" | Mike Rega; Nicholas Terzi | 4:10 |
| 7. | "Take Me in Your Arms" | Tony "Dr. Edit" Garcia; Julian Hernandez; Richard Miranda; John Romano | 4:10 |
| 8. | "Prove Your Love" | Mike Rega; Nicholas Terzi | 3:50 |
