= Afro-Rican =

American hip hop group

- Origin: Miami, Florida, United States
- Genres: Hip hop, Miami bass
- Labels: Luke; Priority; Hip Rock Records; Suntown; Pandisc
- Past members: Derrick Rahming (Rahming); Juan Arroyo (DJ Slice); Marcus Rice (MD Rock); Audre Clemons (Ice-Ski)

Afro-Rican is a Miami bass and hip-hop group, most known for their songs "Give it All You Got (Doggy Style)" and "All of Puerto Rico". The group was formed by Derrick Rahming, and the remainder of the lineup has changed throughout the group's existence. Members of the group have included Rahming, Juan Arroyo (DJ Slice), and Marcus Rice (MD Rock).

== History ==
=== From "We Down Express" to the "Afro-Rican Connection" ===
Afro-Rican grew out of the open-air mobile DJ crew, We Down Express. As the crew, We Down Express, they recorded the song "Bass Attack" for Pandisc Records in 1986, which failed to make much of a mark. Later that year, they rechristened themselves as the Afro-Rican Connection to highlight their biracial makeup, possibly as a way to maximize marketability. As The Afro-Rican Connection, they released the single "It's Live" with "Regina" as a B-side in 1986.

=== Early years and Afro-Rican ===
By 1987, as uptempo club-bass records increased in popularity in the Miami bass scene, Derrick Rahming began production on his imagining of the genre with his E-mu SP-1200 drum sampler. While uptempo music was not his preferred style, he believed labels would not fund records that sold in meager quantities, and to compete with more successful acts of the time such as 2 Live Crew and Kooley C. The group shortened their name to Afro-Rican, and produced "Give it All You Got (Doggy Style)", which samples Kraftwerk's "It's More Fun to Compute" from the Computer World album. The group signed with Edward Meriwether of Suntown Records to release the track.

=== Label recognition and early albums ===
With a larger presence in Miami's music scene, Afro-Rican began Hip-Rock Records and commenced production on an album that contained a more traditional hip-hop sound. The success of their single led to a manufacturing and distribution deal with Luke Skyywalker Records in 1989, recording their debut LP "Against All Odds". However, the sales were less than expected and the deal with Skyywalker Records fell through.

In 1991, Afro-Rican attempted to recover with the release of "Sex and Fun," an album combining their earlier club-bass style with their more recent traditional hip-hop experience, but the album failed to find its audience.

=== Car audio bass and power supply ===
Struggling to maintain funding, Derrick Rahming recorded from his bedroom, a rarity among his contemporaries of the time. However, with the success of acts such as Techmaster P.E.B. and Bass 305 in the new subgenre of "car audio bass" created a niche that was still in its infancy circa 1991, and Rahming used the popularity as an opportunity to release a successful album in a growing genre. Creating an entire album of car audio bass in his bedroom led to the creation of his Car Audio alias, Power Supply. Rahming successfully marketed his music at car shows under his own label, Hip-Rock, and Afro-Rican began to receive more widespread attention.

=== Increased recognition ===
In 1995, a new incarnation of Afro-Rican with Derrick Rahming still at the helm and Marcus Rice (MD Rock) contributing, produced another hit, "All of Puerto Rico". Throughout the 1990s, they discovered and employed artists such as 6-1 Dog, Get Some Crew, and DJ KOS.

=== Recent history ===
In 2000, Afro-Rican continued to receive attention from a new generation of Florida bass music fans due to a remake of the song "Give it All You Got (Doggy Style)", by new-school electro bass group Jackal & Hyde which featured new lead vocals performed by Rahming. Afro-Rican also collaborated with Neil Case's Bass Mekanik imprint under the Pandisc Records' umbrella, producing music borrowing from Car Audio Bass, Florida breaks and traditional hip hop styles.

"Give it All You Got (Doggy Style)" was sampled in the song "Fergalicious" by pop singer Fergie, on her debut solo album, The Dutchess, released in 2006.

Derrick Rahming continues to live and record in South Florida under the aliases "Chameleon" and 'Marc Myword". Rahming produces traditional hip-hop as Marc Myword, and his single "Live for the Pain" was received well by the fans of the genre. Rahming has stated, "Once you're known for a particular music style it's hard to break through with anything other than what you're known for, in this case, Miami bass. I remember the reaction of Denzel Washington's fans when he stepped out of the box and played the bad guy Alonzo Harris in his Academy Award-winning role in Training Day, demonstrating sometimes you have to step out of the box."

Currently, Rahming is back in the studio recording several rock, dance, and hip-hop tracks for a 5-track EP titled "Never Boxed in".
