= They're Playing Our Song (disambiguation) =

They're Playing Our Song is a musical with a book by Neil Simon, lyrics by Carole Bayer Sager, and music by Marvin Hamlisch.

They're Playing Our Song may also refer to:

- "They're Playin' Our Song", a 1995 song by Neal McCoy
- They're Playing Our Song (album), a 1965 album by Al Hirt
- They're Playing Our Song (Frasier), an episode of the television series Frasier
- "They're Playing Our Song" (Trinere song), 1986
- "Hey Baby (They're Playing Our Song)", a 1967 song by The Buckinghams
