= I Still Love You (Lil Suzy song) =

Single by Lil Suzy

from the album Paradise
- Released: 1998
- Genre: Freestyle
- Songwriter: Adam Marano

Lil Suzy singles chronology
"Memories" (1997)	"I Still Love You" (1998)	"You're the Only One" (1999)

"I Still Love You" is a song by freestyle singer Lil Suzy and was released as the third single from her album Paradise in 1998. The song is the only ballad released as a single from the album. On November 28, 1998, the single reached No. 94 on the Billboard Hot 100.

== Track listing ==
US 12" single

No.	Title	Length
1.	"I Still Love You" (Slammin 'Sam's Free at Last Remix)	6:01
2.	"I Still Love You" (808 Mix)	4:47
3.	"I Still Love You" (A Capella)	3:00
4.	"I Still Love You" (Danny Tsettos' & Anthony Acid's Anthem Mix)	8:40
5.	"I Still Love You" (Extended House)	5:10

== Charts ==
Chart (1998)	Peak position
US Billboard Hot 100	94
US Hot Dance Music/Maxi-Singles Sales	32
