= Maggotron =

Pioneer of Miami bass music

- Origin: Miami, Florida
- Genres: Miami bass; electro
- Years active: 1983–
- Labels: Jamarc, Pandisc

Maggotron (born James McCauley, and also known as DXJ, Maggozulu Too, Planet Detroit and Bass Master Kahn) is one of the pioneers of miami bass music. He uses samples from many sources, and is influenced by Parliament, Funkadelic and Earth Wind and Fire among others. In 2000, he collaborated with his former engineer Bass Mekanik on the album Bass Alien – Tales from the Lo-Zone. In 2001, he mixed and compiled a CD featuring miami bass classics for Empirewerks Music: Super Bass – Original Old School Booty Shakers. The same year, his compilation Electro Jamz from the Vaults of Jamron Records encompassed miami bass and electro tracks from his early days as a producer and performer. Due to pressure from Pandisc Records, the humour in his later work for Pandisc became less notable.

Spin Magazine characterized his music as space funk. DXJ's earlier work was characterised by its humorous approach, which can also be seen in his use of pseudonyms. Musically, DXJ's music is characterised by its use of electro/bass beats and rock guitars, as well as vocal samples from all kinds of sources. Cultural and ethnic diversity are also part of the fabric of Maggotron's sound. Men and women of various nationalities have helped work to achieve the sound that Maggotron is noted for.

Internationally known, DXJ'S contributions to miami bass, electro or street music has influenced break beat, crunk, ghettotech and other genres of music. Miami Bass/electro itself is a hybrid branch of the hip-hop and electro music.

== Discography ==
=== Studio albums ===
Year	Album	Label
1985	"Maggotron" (EP)	Jamron
1988	"Miami Bass Wars"	Pandisc
1988	"The Bass that Ate Miami"	Pandisc
1989	"The Invasion Will Not Be Televised"	Jamarc
1989	"The Miami Bass Express"	Pandisc
1989	"Miami Bass Machine"	Jamarc
1989	"Maggozulu Too: Dawn of the Maggozulu"	Pandisc
1990	"Bass Master Kahn & the Elements of Noise: Bassenthrobulation"	Po Funky Blah
1990	"Maggotron: Bass Planet Paranoia"	Pandisc
1990	"The Best of Maggotron: Early Maggots"	Hot
1991	"Maggotron: Bass Man of the Acropolis"	Pandisc
1991	"Miami Bass Wars II"	Pandisc
1991	"Return of the Bass That Ate Miami"	Pandisc
1991	"Bassmaster Khan and the Elements of Noise: Bassentelechy"	Hot
1992	"DJ Madness and Dr. Boom: Ultimate Bass Trax Vol. 1"	Pandisc
1993	"Miami Bass Machine Vol. 2: This Boom's For You"	Pandisc
1993	"Doctor Boom & Beat Dominator: Bass Cube"	Pandisc
1993	"DJ Madness & Dr. Boom: Ultimate Bass Trax Vol. 2"	Pandisc
1994	"Bass Tech DXJ: Bass the Nation"	Pandisc
1994	"Digital Love Muscle: Bass Jams for Lovers"	StreetBeat Records
1994	"Bass Cube 2"	Pandisc
1994	"DJ Madness and Dr. Boom: Ultimate Bass Trax Vol. 3"	Pandisc
1995	"Speaker Wreckin' Bass"	Boomtown
1996	"Maggotron: Forever"	Pandisc
1996	"Bass Tech DXJ: Basslander"	Pandisc
1996	"DJ Madness and Dr. Boom: Ultimate Bass Trax Vol. 4"	Pandisc
1997	"Elecktron: Elecktrofunk"	Hot
1999	"Bass Ryder: Kick It Down Lo"	Pandisc
2001	"Electro Jamz from the Vaults of Jamron Records"	Hot JWP
2005	"Best Of Ultimate Bass Trax Miami Electro"	Pandisc

=== Singles, EPs, 12"s, Compilations ===
On BOUND SOUND RECORDS/JAMRON RECORDS/JAMARC RECORDS.

- OSÉ. Computer Funk. BS 1003–1983.
- MAGGOTRON. Computer Pop. BS 1007 – 1984.
- 7¨Single: THE SONARPHONICS.Superbreakers BS 1010 – 1984.
- THE EMPYRE. Raiders Of The Lost Groove. JR 001 – 1984.
- MAGGOTRON. Planet Detroit Vs The Roxanne Plague, Radio Mars, Escape Devoid, Instrumental Devoid.(EP) JR 002 – 1985.
- THE EMPYRE. Strikin Back b/w Remix Of Raiders of The Lost Groove JR 003 1985.
- THE THIRD DEGREE. Bass It Baby. JR 004 – 1986.
- THE THIRD DEGREE. Bass It Baby (87 Remix) JR 004-87 – 1987.
- SMOKEY DEE & GRANDMASTER L.O.V.E: SUPER BASS JR 005 – 1987.
- MAGGOTRON: Welcome To The Planet Of Bass JM 7729 – 1987.
- D.X.J & THE BASSONLIANS. Bass It Up. JM 7730 – 1987.
- MAGGOTRON. Return To The Planet Of Bass b/w Maggotron's In Your Closet. JM 7731 – 1988.
- BASSADELIC. One Nation Under A Boom b/w Believe Me When I Tell Ya. JM 7732 – 1988.
- D.J EXTRAORDINAIRE & THE BASSADELIC BOOM PATROL. Drop The Bass. JM 7734 – 1988.
- MAGGOTRON. That's My Man Throwing Down. JM 7735 – 1989.
- D.J EXTRAORDIONAIRE. That's Too Hot. JM 7736 – 1989.
- MAGGOTRON. Coming'Back To Bass. JM 7737 – 1990.
- DXJ AND THE BASSONLIANS. Journey To Bassonia (Vinyl Test Pressing). 1987.

On HOT ASSOCIATED LABELS/HOT PRODUCTIONS/PO FUNKY BLAH RECORDS.

- VARIOUS ARTISTS. Mastermixers. HTCD 3336 – HTLP 3336 – 31 July 1990.

On PANDISC RECORDS.

12" Singles:

- PLANET DETROIT: Invasion From The Planet Detroit. PD 004 – 1984.
- PALMERFORCE TWO. Street Wars. PD 007 – 1984. (Vocal Arrangement By DXJ, Produced By: BO CRANE).
- MAGGOTRON CRUSHING CREW. Bass Rock The Planet. PD 019 – 1986.
- MISSY J AND THE ROLEX SOCIAL CLUB. My Friend Joan (Can We Rap). PD 021 – 1985/1986.
- THE THIRD DEGREE. Say It Loud (I Like Rap And I'm Proud). PD 024 – 1987. (Edited By DYNAMIX II).
- MAGGOZULU TOO. Mix It Baby. PD 025 – 1988.
- THE SONARPHONICS. Attack On The Planet Of Bass. PD 026 – 1988.
- SMOKEY D & D.X.J. All You Need Is Bass These Days. PD 028 – 1988.
- MAGGOTRON CRUSHING CREW. The Bass That Ate Miami. PD 029 – 1988. (Promo Copy).
- SMOKEY D, D.X.J & SUPER JB. Get Hyped. PD 033 – 1989.
- MAGGOTRON CRUSHING CREW b/w D.X.J & THE MIAMI BASS MOB. The Bass That Ate Miami b/w Bass Wars. PD 037 – 1989.
- D.X.J AND THE MIAMI BASS MOB b/w THE LATIN MAGGOTS. Do You Want To Rock? b/w Uh, Uno, Tres, Four. PD 058 – 1990.
- MAGGOTRON CRUSHING CREW Feat SMOKEY D.E.E & MC KASPER. Miami's Rocking´ Baby (Miami Jams). PD 068 – 1991.
- MARK THE 808 BASS QUEEN b/w KNOB SQUAD. 900 Bass Number b/w Poetry is Not A Pretty Little Business. PD 073 – 1991.
- D.J MADNESS & DR BOOM. Smokin'Hot Funk. PD 087 – 1992. 8805 – 1989. (12¨ Only).

On STREET BEAT RECORDS:

- DIGITAL LOVE MUSCLE. Bass Jams For Lovers. SB 1008 – January 1995. (CD Only)
- VARIOUS ARTISTS. Electro Breaks Vol 1. SB 1024 – February 1997. (Track 9: BREAK BEAT EXPRESS – Drop The Beat, Produced By DXJ). (CD Only).

On JOEY BOY RECORDS:

- DX-J AND THE BASSONLIANS. Bassonlian Attack b/w Bassonlian Conquest. JR 6002 – 1986.
- BPS. You're A Clown b/w BPS On Tour. JR 6003 – 1986.

On 4 SIGHT RECORDS.

- THE MAGGOTRONICS. Radio Mars. FS 1- 84-2 – 1984.
- MC A.D.E. Bass Mechanic. FS 1- 86-13 – 1986. (Drum Programmed By D.X.J).

On ATLANTIC RECORDS:

- MAGGOTRON. Bass Invaders b/w Fresh Beets. ATR 1242 – 1988.
- MAGGOTRON. Return To The Planet Of Bass b/w Maggotron's In Your Closet. DMD 1202 – 1988. (Promo copy).

On ZYX RECORDS:

- MAGGOTRON. Return To The Planet Of Bass b/w Maggotron's In Your Closet. ZYX 5918 – 1988.

On COOMACK RECORDS:

- SILVER PLATINUM. Agent Six Nine. CM 69 – 1986. (Drum Programmed By DXJ).

On CHANCE RECORDS:

- TOTAL INFLUENCE. Stay Don't Go b/w Give It Up. An OO 03 (1987).

On LITTLE LISA RECORDS (distributed by HOT):

- THE SHAFT. Funky Shaft Makossa b/w Funky Dub Makossa. (HAL 12158, HAL 12158/1990) (Produced by Iman Biyaldi aka DXJ)

On ROONEY RECORDS:

- ERNIE RANGLIN. Phantoms Of The Bass. RRI 1500 – 1988. (Produced By D.X.J & Ernest Ranglin)

On DEBONAIRE RECORDS:

- MAGGOTRON: Mission Electro. 2007.
