= Catch Me (I'm Falling) =

Single by Pretty Poison

from the album Catch Me I'm Falling
- Released: August 1987
- Recorded: 1987
- Genre: Freestyle; dance-pop
- Length: 4:54 (album version); 4:20 (single version)
- Label: Virgin
- Songwriters: Whey Cooler; Jade Starling
- Producers: Kurt Shore; Kae Williams, Jr.

Pretty Poison singles chronology
"Nighttime" (1984)	"Catch Me (I'm Falling)" (1987)	"Nighttime" (1988)

"Catch Me (I'm Falling)" is a song released by American group Pretty Poison in 1987. It features a sample of the bass from René & Angela's 1985 popular song "I'll Be Good". It was included on the soundtrack to the film Hiding Out, which starred Jon Cryer and came out the same year; it later appeared on Pretty Poison's debut album Catch Me I'm Falling. It was Pretty Poison's biggest hit single to date, peaking at number one on the Billboard Hot Dance Club Play chart in late September 1987. Later that same year, it charted inside the top ten of the Billboard Hot 100 chart, peaking at number eight and remaining in the top 40 for 14 weeks. The single was certified gold by the RIAA on March 9, 1989. In the UK it entered the Top 100 for two weeks at the end of January 1988 and peaked at number 85.

== Charts ==
Chart (1987–1988)	Peak position
U.S. Billboard Hot 100	8
U.S. Billboard Hot Dance Club Play	1

Chart (1988)	Peak position
UK Singles Chart	85
New Zealand Singles Chart	26

=== Year-end charts ===
Chart (1988)	Position
US Billboard Hot 100	66
