= Lil Suzy =

American singer-songwriter (born 1979)

- Also known as: Little Suzy
- Born: Suzanne Casale; March 1, 1979 (age 47); Brooklyn, New York, U.S.
- Genres: Freestyle; dance-pop; Eurodance
- Instruments: Vocals
- Years active: 1987–present

Suzanne Casale Melone (née Casale; born March 1, 1979), better known by her stage name Lil Suzy, is an American freestyle/pop singer who was mainly active in the 1990s. Lil Suzy is best known for the singles "Take Me in Your Arms", "Promise Me", and "Can't Get You Out of My Mind".

== Early life ==
Melone was born in Brooklyn, New York City. While singing cover songs in Manhattan Beach, Brooklyn at age 5, she was discovered by an agent. She then began performing as an opening act for Thelma Houston and Village People.

== Music career ==
=== 1987–1994: Career beginnings, Love Can't Wait, and Back to Dance ===
At 8 years old, Melone got her first contract with Fever Records, and in 1988 released her first single, "Randy".

At age 12 she joined the label Warlock Records. In November 1991, Melone released her first studio album, Love Can't Wait, which was produced by Tony Garcia. It was preceded by the single "Take Me in Your Arms" which peaked at No. 67 on the Billboard Hot 100. Another single, "Falling in Love", was released in 1992. She was named Billboard magazine's Best New Dance Artist that year, making her the youngest artist ever to receive the honor.

In early 1994, her second album Back to Dance was released. This album was again produced by Tony Garcia. "Turn the Beat Around" was released in late 1993 as the sole single from the album but was not successful. Due to the limited success of the album, Lil Suzy left Warlock Records and went on to become president of her own record label, Empress Records.

=== 1995–2001: Life Goes On and Paradise ===
In April 1995, Melone released her third album, Life Goes On, a Eurodance release. The album spawned four singles, the first being "Promise Me", which peaked at No. 62 on the Billboard Hot 100.

In 1997, Melone released her fourth studio album, Paradise. The album spawned four singles; Can't Get You Out of My Mind was the most successful of these releases. The album contains a collaboration with singer Crystal Waters on the track "Love Letter Lost". The album also contains a cover of the Netzwerk song, "Memories". In 1999, Melone released The MegaMix, a compilation of old hits and new remixes.

=== 2002–present: The Greatest Hits and later releases ===
In 2002, Melone released The Greatest Hits, a compilation of her greatest hits re-recorded. In the same year, together with Collage, she released the single "Don't You Want Me", exclusively for the German market. The single is a cover of the song by The Human League.

In 2009, Melone released the single "Dance Tonight".

In 2015 and 2022 she toured in Freestyle Explosion shows.

== Personal life ==
Melone is married to Marc Melone. They have a daughter (born 2007) and two sons (born 2009 and 2012).

In her 20s, between recording and performing music, Melone attended school to become a registered medical assistant. She worked part-time for a OB/GYN for three years.

On 2 October 2000, she opened a beauty salon in Staten Island, which has since closed.

== Discography ==
=== Studio albums ===
Year	Album details
1991	Love Can't Wait: Released: November 18, 1991; Label: Warlock Records
1994	Back to Dance: Released: January 11, 1994; Label: Warlock Records
1995	Life Goes On: Released: April 8, 1995; Label: Metropolitan Recording Corporation
1997	Paradise: Released: July 8, 1997; Label: Metropolitan Recording Corporation

=== Compilation albums ===
Year	Album details
1999	The MegaMix: Released: November 30, 1999; Label: Metropolitan Recording Corporation
2002	The Greatest Hits: Released: January 22, 2002; Label: Empire Musicwerks

=== Singles ===
Year	Single	Peak positions			Album
Year	Single	US Hot 100	US Rhythmic Top 40	US Maxi-singles Sales	Album
1988	"Randy"	-	-	-	Non-album single
1991	"Take Me in Your Arms"	67	-	-	Love Can't Wait
1992	"Falling in Love"	-	-	-	Love Can't Wait
1993	"Turn the Beat Around"	-	-	-	Back to Dance
1994	"Promise Me"	62	26	17	Life Goes On
1995	"Now & Forever"	-	-	-	Life Goes On
1995	"When I Fall in Love"	-	-	-	Life Goes On
1996	"Just Can't Get Over You"	-	-	-	Life Goes On
1997	"Can't Get You Out of My Mind"	79	-	14	Paradise
1997	Memories	-	-	-	Paradise
1998	"I Still Love You"	94	-	32	Paradise
1999	"You're the Only One"	-	-	-	The MegaMix
2002	"Don't You Want Me"	-	-	-	Non-album single
2009	"Dance Tonight"	-	-	-	Non-album single

=== Video clips ===
Year	Single
1991	"Take Me in Your Arms"
1993	"Turn the Beat Around"
1995	"When I Fall in Love"

=== Other songs ===
- 1996 - "Suzanna", with Collage, released on the compilation Metropolitan Freestyle Extravaganza Volume 7.
- 1997 - "Runaway", released on the compilation Dance Trip 2000.
- 1999 - "He's All I Want for Christmas / Letter to Santa", released on the compilation Freestyle X-Mas.
- 1999 - "All I Want ", with Collage, released on the album Chapter II: 1999.
- 2002 - "Treat Me Right", originally recorded in 2001, released on the compilation Euro Freestyle Invasion.
- 2003 - "I Still Cry", originally recorded in 2002, released on the compilation Euro Freestyle Invasion II.
