= Bad Boy Joe =

- Born: Joey Marcano; Brooklyn, New York City, United States
- Genres: Freestyle, house, club, dance
- Occupations: DJ, Producer, Remixer
- Labels: What If Productions; Ultra Records
- Website: www.badboyjoe.com

Bad Boy Joe (born Joey Marcano in Brooklyn, New York) is an American DJ, producer and remixer of Italian descent. He's best known for his megamixes, which appeared on Louie DeVito's NYC Underground Party, Dance Factory and Dance Divas mix series. He can be heard on WKTU from 5 to 6 and also on had a mixshow "The Megamix" every Saturday night from 11-midnight on Sirius Satellite Radio The Beat channel 36. After November 12, 2008, The Beat was replaced with BPM and is no longer on the channel. He also produces a series of shows and events for New York City's reigning Dance music station WKTU, more recently KTU's Beatstock. He owns his own record label entitled "What If Productions".

In 1999, he finally got his big break after catching the eye of another DJ around the New York area Louie DeVito, who hired Joe to help him with his NYC Underground Party mix series before releasing his own series of mixed compilation albums.

== Discography ==
- The Best of Freestyle Megamix (13 February 2001)
- The Best of Freestyle Megamix, Vol. 2 (21 August 2001)
- The Ultimate House Megamix (20 August 2002)
- The Best of Freestyle Megamix, Vol. 3 (28 March 2003)
- The Best of Freestyle Megamix, Vol. 4 (21 October 2003)
- The Best of Freestyle Megamix, Vol. 5 (13 April 2004)
- The Best of NYC Afterhours: Feel the Drums (15 June 2004)
- The Best of NYC Vocal Clubhouse: 1 a.m. Sessions (23 November 2004)
- Club Anthems Vol. 2 (8 March 2005)
- The Best of NYC Afterhours, Vol. 2: Feel the Drums (14 June 2005)
- The Best of NYC Afterhours, Vol. 3: Feel the Drums (1 November 2005)
- Ultra.Dance 07 (24 January 2006)
- The Best of NYC Afterhours, Vol. 4: Re-Live the Music (13 June 2006)
- The Best of NYC Vocal Clubhouse, Vol. 2 (7 November 2006)
- Legends of Freestyle (24 June 2008)
- Old School Clubhouse... Back in the Day (22 July 2008)
- Freestyle Dance Party: New Dance Remixes (20 October 2009)
- Addicted to Drums: 4 a.m. Mix (17 November 2009)
- Jersey Shore Fist Pumpin' Mix (4 May 2010)
- 100% Pure Freestyle (24 August 2010)
