= Pretty Poison (group) =

Philadelphia band

- Origin: Philadelphia, Pennsylvania, U.S.
- Genres: Dance-pop, freestyle
- Years active: 1981–present
- Labels: Poison Pops, Svengali, Virgin
- Members: Jade Starling; Whey Cooler; Kaya Pryor; Lou Franco
- Website: prettypoisonmusic.com

Pretty Poison is an American dance group based out of Philadelphia, Pennsylvania, United States. Group members are Jade Starling (lead vocalist); Whey Cooler (keyboardist and guitarist); and Kaya Pryor (percussionist). Thomas Hays was also a guitarist as was Lou Franco. Pretty Poison is best known for their hit "Catch Me (I'm Falling)", a top 10 U.S. Billboard Hot 100 hit in 1987.

== History ==
They charted for the first time in 1984 with the song "Nighttime", which hit number 14 on the U.S. Hot Dance Club Play chart. "Nighttime" was released on the Svengali label. In 1987, their song "Catch Me (I'm Falling)" was featured in the Jon Cryer movie Hiding Out, and with heavy MTV exposure, it became a top 10 U.S. Billboard Hot 100 hit, peaking at number 8. The song also went to number 1 on the dance chart. The B-side contained a shorter Spanish mix vocal. A re-recorded version of "Nighttime" in 1988 became their second Hot 100 hit, climbing to number 36. Pretty Poison opened for The Clockmen in May 1986 at Drexel University's Battle of the Bands.

Pretty Poison had several more dance chart entries, the most recent being a new version of "Catch Me (I'm Falling)" which hit number 43 in 1998.

February 2009 saw the release of new song "Finga Lickin' Good" on iTunes.

== Discography ==
=== Albums ===
- Laced (Svengali, 1983)
- Catch Me I'm Falling (Virgin, 1988)
- Deflowered (as Sex In Violets) (FTS, 1995)
- Greatest Hits Vol. 1 (Svengali, 1997)
- Euphoria (Svengali, 1998)

=== Singles ===
- "Gimme Gimme Your Autograph" b/w "Kill You" (Poison Pops, 1981)
- "No Tears" b/w "Sakii" (Svengali, 1982)
- "Expiration" b/w "The Realm of Existence" (Svengali, 1983)
- "Nighttime" (Svengali, 1984)
- "Catch Me (I'm Falling)" (Svengali/Virgin, 1987) [#8 US]
- "Nighttime" (re-release) (Virgin, 1988) [#36 US]
- "When I Look into Your Eyes" (Virgin, 1988)
- "Better Better Be Good to Me" (Tracer, 1992)
- "Take Me I'm Yours" (Chemikal Entertainment Group, 2006)
- "Finga Lickin' Good" (2009)

=== Remixes ===
- "Let Freedom Ring" (Svengali, 1996/1997)
- "Catch Me I'm Falling '98" (Svengali, 1998)
