= Promise Me (Lil Suzy song) =

Single by Lil Suzy

from the album Life Goes On
- Released: October 10, 1994
- Studio: Da Crib Studios (Brooklyn, NY)
- Genre: Freestyle, dance
- Length: 3:57
- Label: Empress Music; Metropolitan Recording Corporation
- Songwriters: Amanda Espinet, Victor Franco
- Producer: Victor Franco

Lil Suzy singles chronology
"Turn the Beat Around" (1994)	"Promise Me" (1994)	"Now & Forever" (1995)

"Promise Me" is a song written by Amanda Espinet and Victor Franco and is the first single from the album Life Goes On, released by freestyle singer Lil Suzy on October 10, 1994. It is Lil Suzy's most successful song on the Billboard Hot 100 chart, peaking at No. 62.

This song was launched by Empress Music label, which belonged to Lil Suzy and who at the time she was 16 years old.

== Track listing ==
US CD/12" single

No.	Title	Length
1.	"Promise Me" (Extended Mix)	4:42
2.	"Promise Me" (Accapella)	1:52
3.	"Promise Me" (Radio Mix)	3:57
4.	"Promise Me" (Back to the Old School Mix)	4:45
5.	"Promise Me" (Old School Radio Mix)	3:57
6.	"Promise Me" (Jazzy Hip Hop Mix)	4:29
7.	"Promise Me" (Non-Stop Razor Beats)	1:36

== Charts ==
Chart (1994–95)	Peak position
US Billboard Hot 100	62
US Hot Dance Music/Maxi-Singles Sales (Billboard)	17
US Rhythmic Top 40 (Billboard)	26
