= Joey Gilmore =

American singer-songwriter (1944–2024)

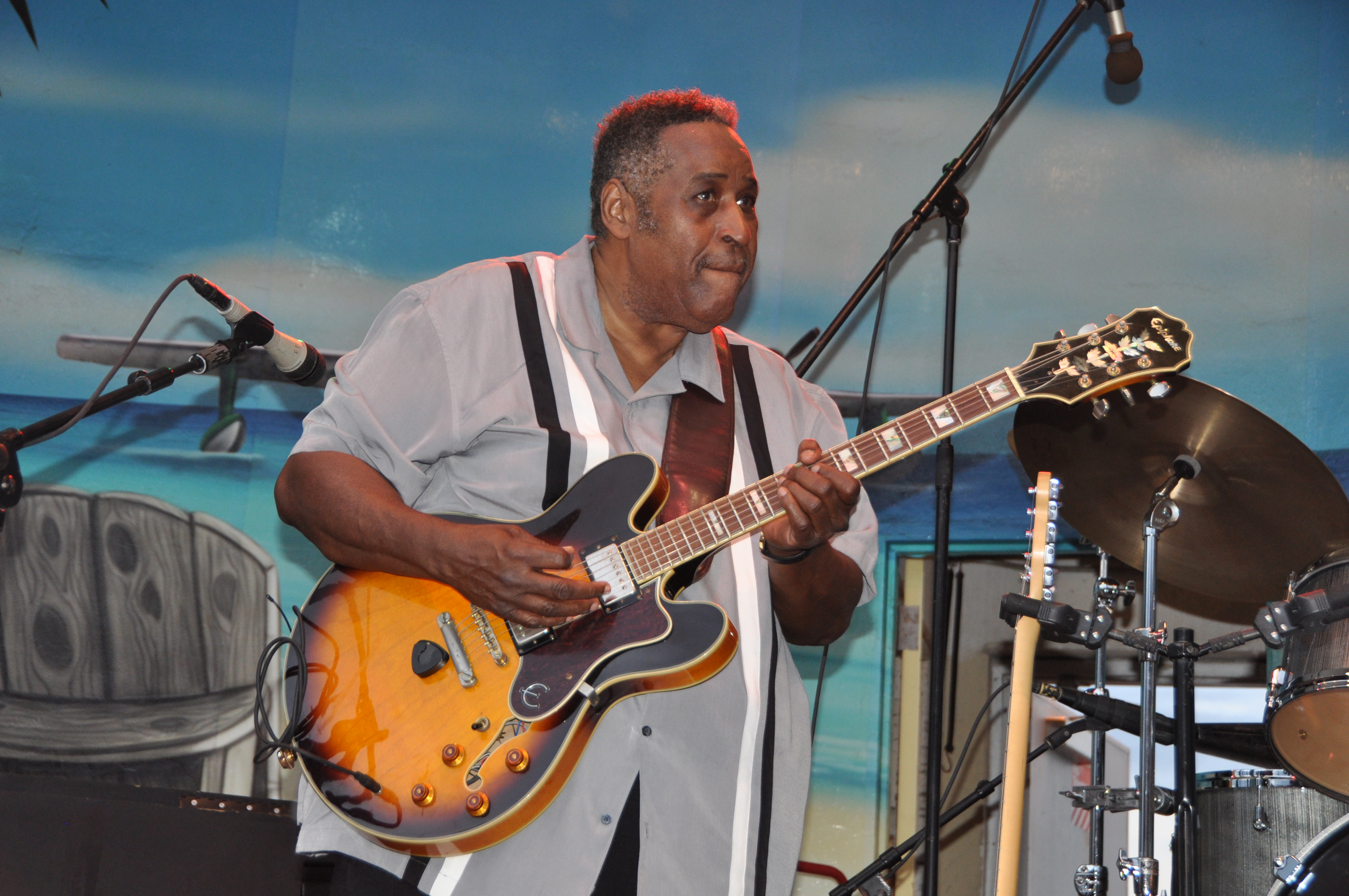

Background information
- Born: Joshua Gilmore; June 4, 1944; Ocala, Florida, U.S.
- Died: July 29, 2024 (aged 80) Florida, U.S.
- Genres: Electric blues, soul blues
- Occupation(s): Singer, songwriter, guitarist
- Instrument(s): Guitar, vocals
- Years active: 1960s–2024
- Website: joeygilmore.net

Joshua Gilmore Jr. (June 4, 1944 – July 29, 2024), known professionally as Joey Gilmore, was an American electric blues and soul blues singer, songwriter, and guitarist. He shared the stage with James Brown, Etta James, Bobby Bland, Little Milton, and Little Johnny Taylor among others. Gilmore's best known tracks include "Blues All Over You".

== Biography ==
Gilmore was born in Ocala, Florida, on June 4, 1944. Self-taught on the guitar at an early age, from watching a local minister-cum-barber playing his own flat-bodied guitar, Gilmore initially headed a band of youths who appeared in local clubs long before they were legally able to enter such establishments.

In the 1960s, Gilmore relocated to South Florida, and he became a popular local attraction which led to him accompanying many touring blues, R&B and soul musicians. He recorded a small number of tracks in the 1970s, including his debut single "Somebody Done Took My Baby And Gone" / "Do It To Me One More Time" (1971). He released several EPs at that time, as well as the Joey Gilmore album (1977), which was re-released in 2012. His next album was So Good to be Bad (1989), released by Pandisc Records. The album reached number 80 on the US Billboard R&B album chart. It took until the mid 1990s before Gilmore began recording more frequently, and he appeared at numerous blues, jazz and soul festivals which included dates in Fort Lauderdale, Hollywood, Mississippi Valley, Montreux, Riverwalk, and in Taiwan. In 2012 he played at the Daytona Blues Festival.

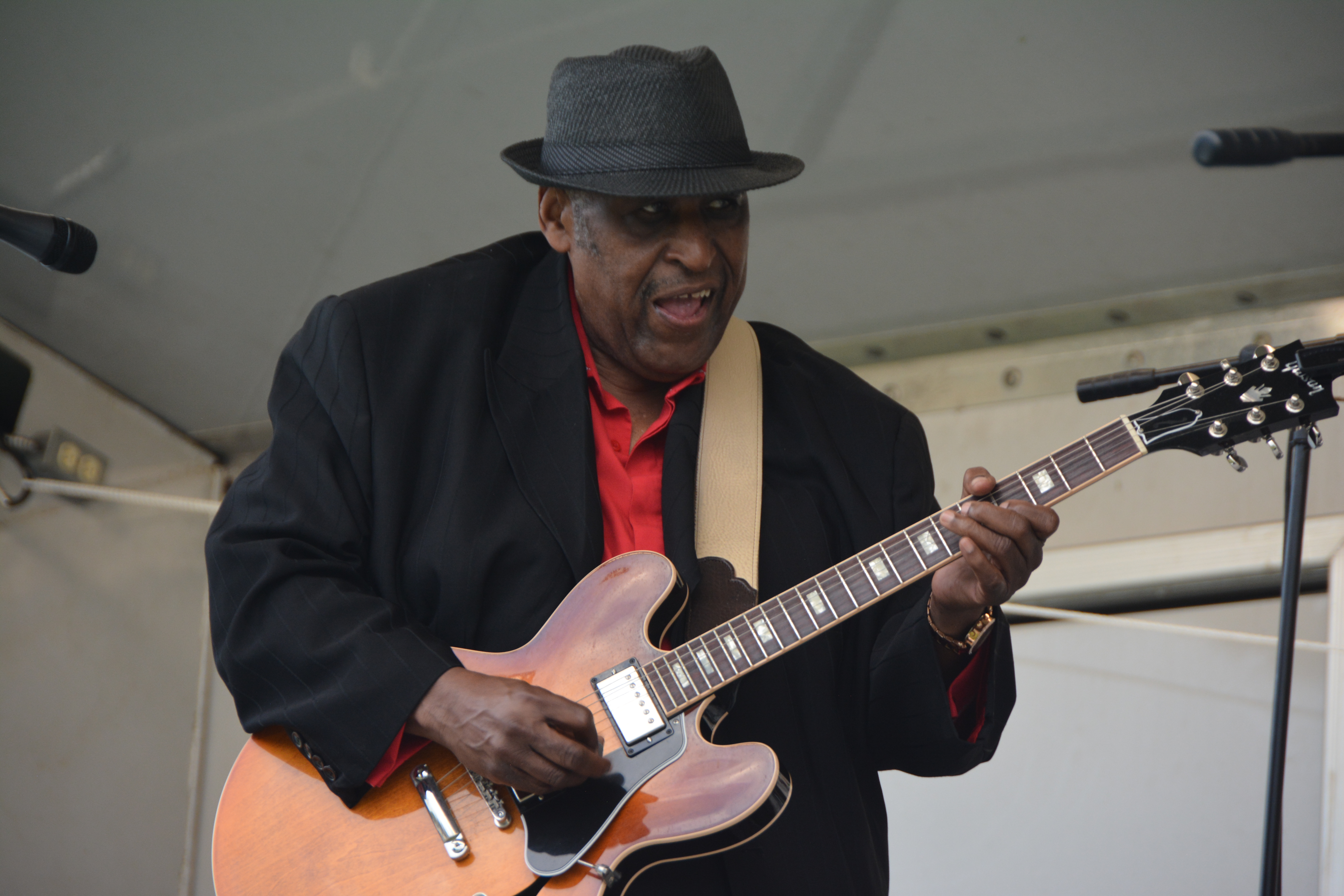
Gilmore in 2018

In 2006, Gilmore and his backing band took part in the Blues Foundation's International Blues Challenge in Memphis, Tennessee, where he won the 'Best Band' section.

Among Gilmore's sidemen in the mid-2000s were Regi Oliver (saxophone/keyboard), George Caldwell (bass) and Dave Wooten (drums).

In 2008, Gilmore was awarded a Blewzzy Award for the 'best song', "Blues All Over You". In the same year he released Bluesman, on Emancipation Media, and appeared at the Poconos Blues Festival. In 2009, Gilmore performed at the Taichung Jazz Festival, and the Briggs Farm Blues Festival. In 2013, Gilmore undertook various functions backed by the Sean Carney Band.

In 2015, Gilmore was honored with a Latin World Talent Lifetime Achievement Award. He continued to regularly play throughout his native Florida, including an appearance at the Pompano Beach Seafood Festival, and beyond. His album, Brandon's Blues, was self-released by Gilmore in 2015.

Gilmore died in Florida on July 29, 2024, at the age of 80.

== Discography ==
=== Albums ===
Year	Title	Record label
1977	Joey Gilmore	Henry Stone Music
1989	So Good to be Bad	Pandisc Records
1993	Can't Kill Nothin'	Ichiban Records
1995	Just Call Me Joey	Ichiban Records
2006	The Ghosts of Mississippi Meet the Gods of Africa	Bluzpik Records
2008	Bluesman	Emancipation Media
2015	Brandon's Blues	CD Baby
2016	Respect the Blues	Mosher St. Records
