= Hiding Out =

1987 film by Bob Giraldi

- Theatrical release poster
- Directed by: Bob Giraldi
- Written by: Joe Menosky; Jeff Rothberg
- Produced by: Jeff Rothberg
- Starring: Jon Cryer; Annabeth Gish
- Cinematography: Daniel Pearl
- Edited by: Edward Warschilka
- Music by: Anne Dudley
- Distributed by: De Laurentiis Entertainment Group
- Release date: November 6, 1987
- Running time: 98 minutes
- Country: United States
- Language: English
- Budget: $7 million
- Box office: $7.02 million (domestic)

Hiding Out is a 1987 American romantic thriller comedy-drama film starring Jon Cryer as a state's witness who disguises himself as a high school student in order to avoid being killed by the mob.

== Plot ==
Andrew Morenski and two others, all stockbrokers, have passed bogus bonds for a mobster awaiting trial. After an evening out at a bar, one of them is killed in his home. The next morning, the FBI take the other two into protective custody.

Convincing his FBI bodyguards to have breakfast out of the safe house, Andrew and the agents are followed by hitmen. Andrew flees the diner after one of his bodyguards is killed and the other is injured. While running from the hitmen, he boards a train, temporarily escaping. Andrew hitches a ride with a truck driver to Topsail, Delaware, where he phones his Aunt Lucy, who tells him to meet her at the local high school where she is the nurse.

Shaving his beard and bleaching the sides of his hair blonde, Andrew then trades his $500 Italian sports coat for an overcoat from a bum to complete his disguise. Arriving at Topsail High School, the office personnel mistake him for a new student and register him for classes. He enrolls as Maxwell Hauser, quickly taking it from a Maxwell House coffee can.

Andrew's cousin and fellow classmate, Patrick, does not recognize him at first. Andrew eventually pulls him aside, revealing himself. He also sleeps at Patrick's, unbeknownst to his aunt.

Not willing to take the teachers' biased attitudes, Andrew becomes a hero to those tired of the school's status quo. This upsets Kevin O'Roarke, the current class president, and captures the heart of Ryan Campbell. During an afternoon at the local diner, he accidentally drops a birthday card meant for his grandmother (who had raised him) and it gets mailed. Later, a hitman posing as an FBI agent contacts his grandmother and sees the card and its postmark, which reveals where Andrew is hiding.

One night, back from a date with Ryan, Patrick stops Andrew from entering the house. FBI agents have arrived, knowing he is close because he used his ATM card. Patrick takes his mother's school keys and Andrew ends up using the high school as his refuge. He meets the school janitor, Ezzard, and shares a drink with him, revealing who he is. Andrew, now very popular, is coerced into running for class president, not knowing the election committee has already decided to rig the results in favor of Kevin.

Realising he is the last witness against the mobster, Andrew decides to drop out of the election at the school assembly. During the presentation of class election results, Kevin is announced the winner. However, Kevin demands a recount, which reveals that a majority want Andrew as class president. As Andrew starts to address the crowd, a hitman begins firing at the stage. Ezzard, watching the proceedings, incapacitates one of the hitmen, while the other moves up into the rafters of the gym. Andrew chases him and Patrick uses a spotlight to blind the hitman, who loses his grip and falls to the gym floor below.

Images of graduation are spliced into images of Andrew taking the stand in court against the mobster for whom he had sold the bogus bonds. After his testimony, Andrew is given a few minutes to say farewell to his grandmother before being placed in the Witness Protection Program.

The last scene is of Ryan, sitting under a tree at a university in Iowa. Andrew, with a different look and now known as Eddie Collins, appears from behind the tree and tells her he has enrolled there to become a teacher.

== Cast ==
- Jon Cryer as Andrew Morenski/Maxwell Hauser
- Keith Coogan as Patrick Morenski
- Annabeth Gish as Ryan Campbell
- Claude Brooks as Clinton
- Oliver Cotton as Killer
- Tim Quill as Kevin O'Roarke
- Tony Soper as Ahern
- Ned Eisenberg as Rodriguez
- Marita Geraghty as Janie Rooney
- John Spencer as Bakey
- Gretchen Cryer as Lucy Morenski
- Anne Pitoniak as Grandma Jennie
- Beth Ehlers as Chloe
- Richard Portnow as Mr. Lessig
- Gerry Bamman as Mr. Stevens
- Jack Gilpin as Dr. Gusick
- Joy Behar as Gertrude
- Lou Walker as Ezzard

== Soundtrack ==
Four songs from the film's soundtrack entered the record charts in the United States: "Crying" by Roy Orbison (re-recorded as a duet with k.d. lang (Note: Lang much later wrote about the experience of recording Crying with Orbison in The Immortals - The Greatest Artists of All Time: 37) Roy Orbison, from Rolling Stone magazine)); "Live My Life" by Boy George; "Catch Me (I'm Falling)" by Pretty Poison, which went top ten in the US and also topped the Billboard Hot Dance Club Play chart in September 1987; and the top-20 U.S. hit "You Don't Know" by Scarlett and Black. The UK hit "Seattle" by Public Image Ltd. was also recorded in 1987 and featured in the film.

=== Album ===
Virgin Records America released a soundtrack album in 1987 on LP, cassette and CD.

Hiding Out soundtrack
No.	Title	Performer(s)	Length
1.	"Live My Life"	Boy George	4:32
2.	"Bang Your Head"	Lolita Pop	3:41
3.	"Catch Me (I'm Falling)"	Pretty Poison	4:25
4.	"You Don't Know"	Scarlett & Black	3:49
5.	"So Different Now"	Felix Cavaliere	4:00
6.	"Run! Hide!"	All That Jazz	4:11
7.	"I Refuse"	Hue & Cry	3:36
8.	"Crying"	Roy Orbison / k.d. lang	3:44
9.	"Max For President Rap"	Lee Anthony Brisdon / David L. Robinson / Daryl Smith	2:02
10.	"Real Life"	Black Britain	3:53
11.	"Seattle"	P.I.L.	3:38

== Reception ==
On the review aggregator website Rotten Tomatoes, 38% of 8 critics' reviews are positive, with an average rating of 4.7/10.

=== Critical response ===
Roger Ebert compared the film to Like Father, Like Son, also released in 1987, in that it was an "example of the newest Hollywood genre, the Generation Squeeze, in which plots artificially combine adult and teenage elements" in order to attract the latter to the movie theater while attracting enough of an adult audience for the success of the rental market. Ebert describes as "dumb" the main plot device involving the gangsters' continuing pursuit of Andrew, and the story arc about the janitor he befriends, and notes that the film fails to depict how the 29-year-old protagonist could have much in common with Gish's character, who is more than 10 years younger than he is. He credited the film with getting him to wonder what it would be like to revisit one's high school years, but cites Peggy Sue Got Married from 1986 as a film that had portrayed that scenario much more successfully.

Janet Maslin called the film "pleasant enough" with "mild" jokes that "revolve around things such as Mr. Cryer's accidentally giving tax advice to the father of a teenage girl he's dating, or his feeling out of place at the roller rink." She thought the film's conclusion suggested that Cryer "could have unexpected charm in more adult roles."

The Time Out Film Guide called the film "predictable, slackly plotted nonsense, marginally redeemed by a genial young cast."
