= Ultra Hits =

Ultra. Hits

Compilation album (Mix)
- Released: (United States) May 19, 2009
- Genre: Dance-pop, Dance
- Label: Ultra Records
- Compiler: David Waxman

chronology
| Ultra. Hits (2009) | Ultra Hits 2 (2014) |

Ultra. Hits is a mixed dance music compilation album mixed by David Waxman from Ultra Records. The album contains a collection of the most popular songs of the previous year. A sequel was released in 2014, which also contains a remix of Beware Of The Boys (Mundian To Bach Ke). However it is only available on streaming services in the US and initially was on digital storefronts like iTunes.

== Track listing ==
1. "All Of The Above" - Maino feat. T-Pain
2. "Echo (Remix)" - Gorilla Zoe feat. Diddy
3. "Because Of You" - Ne-Yo
4. "I Know You Want Me (Calle Ocho)" - Pitbull
5. "Breakin' Dishes" - Rihanna
6. "I'm The Ish" - DJ Class
7. "Move (If You Wanna)" - Mims
8. "My President" - Young Jeezy feat. Nas
9. "Stanky Legg" - GS Boyz
10. "Make tha Trap Say Aye" - OJ Da Juiceman feat. Gucci Mane
11. "I Run" - Slim Thug feat. Yelawolf
12. "Hot Music" - Remedy feat. Da Pounders
13. "Boyfriend #2 (The Council Remix)" - Pleasure P
14. "Took The Night" - Chelley
15. "Beware Of The Boys (Mundian To Bach Ke) (Aaron LaCrate & Debonair Samir B-More Gutter Alternate Version)" - Panjabi MC
16. "Whine" - Enur feat. Beenie Man & Natalie Storm
17. "She Came Along" - Sharam feat. Kid Cudi
