= Love House =

Single by Samantha Fox

from the album I Wanna Have Some Fun
- B-side: "Don't Cheat on Me"
- Released: October 1988
- Genre: Acid house; freestyle
- Length: 4:34
- Label: Jive
- Songwriters: Rob Bolland; Ferdi Bolland
- Producers: Rob Bolland; Ferdi Bolland

Samantha Fox singles chronology
"Naughty Girls (Need Love Too)" (1987)	"Love House" (1988)	"I Wanna Have Some Fun" (1988)

Music video
- "Love House" on YouTube

"Love House" is a song by English singer Samantha Fox from her third studio album, I Wanna Have Some Fun (1988). Rob Bolland and Ferdi Bolland wrote and produced the song. It was released as the first European single from the album in the third quarter of 1988. In the United States, it was released as the album's third and final single in 1989.

== Song information ==
"Love House" was one of the first acid house singles to appear on mainstream charts. In 2009, reflecting on the rave era, Fox stated, "Of course, I experienced the acid house scene. It actually happened in London at the end of the ‘80s and acid house parties were held in disused warehouses that were taken over for one night only."

Among the samples used is a vocable from "Just That Type of Girl" by Madame X and "Yamsaharny" by singer Umm Kulthum. The "Black Pyramid Mix" was produced by electronic music producer Kevin Saunderson.

== Reception ==
Upon the single release Jerry Smith of British magazine Music Week found that "Acid House has well and truly gone overground" here and single already "picked up by aficionados for its bandwagon jumping Acid Mixes, where her vocal is at a minimum." Billboard reviewer described song as "house groove along with Fox's teasing vocal" and considered it "much hipper than the previous single, ″I Only Wanna Be With You″." The Orlando Sentinel praised the song saying, "Rob and Ferdi Bolland twiddle the knobs to grand effect on 'Love House' and also on 'One in a Million'." The Dallas Morning News, however, dismissed the track as "computerized schlock" and "pseudofunk."

The single peaked at number 32 on the UK Singles Chart. In the United States, it failed to reach the Billboard Hot 100. However, it reached number 14 on Billboard's Hot Dance Club Play chart. In Finland, it became Fox's sixth top 10 single there.

== Music video ==
The single's music video was avant-garde in concept, with Fox shown in various outfits including a kimono and a sari. Fox's exuberant performance is contrasted with eerie characters and effects, creating a sense of foreboding.

== Track listings ==
- 7-inch single

A. "Love House" – 3:35
B. "Don't Cheat on Me" – 3:03

- UK 12-inch single

A. "Love House" (The Black Pyramid mix) – 6:40
B1. "Love House" (Sulphuric mix) – 7:40
B2. "Don't Cheat on Me" – 3:03

- US 12-inch single

A1. "Love House" (The Black Pyramid mix) – 6:40
A2. "Love House" (DJ Pierre Club mix) – 5:59
A3. "Love House" (7″ edit) – 3:35
B1. "Love House" (Coldest mix) – 6:15
B2. "Love House" (7″ remix) – 4:00
B3. "Love House" (The Chicago House Jam mix) – 6:00
B4. "Don't Cheat on Me" – 3:03

== Charts ==
Chart performance for Love House
Chart (1988–1989)	Peak position
Australia (ARIA)	86
Belgium (Ultratop 50 Flanders)	11
Europe (Eurochart Hot 100 Singles)	35
Finland (Suomen virallinen lista)	6
Italy (Musica e dischi)	17
Netherlands (Dutch Top 40)	10
Netherlands (Single Top 100)	10
Quebec (ADISQ)	25
Spain (AFYVE)	10
Switzerland (Schweizer Hitparade)	19
UK Singles (Official Charts)	32
US Dance Club Songs (Billboard)	13
US Dance Singles Sales (Billboard)	23
West Germany (GfK)	25
