= I Wanna Have Some Fun (song) =

Single by Samantha Fox

from the album I Wanna Have Some Fun
- B-side: "Out of Our Hands" "Lovin' Don't Grow on Trees" "Don't Cheat on Me"
- Released: October 1988 (US); June 1989 (UK)
- Recorded: 1987–88
- Genre: Freestyle; house
- Length: 5:02; 4:06 (7" version)
- Label: Jive; RCA
- Songwriter: Full Force
- Producer: Full Force

Samantha Fox singles chronology
"Love House" (1988)	"I Wanna Have Some Fun" (1988)	"I Only Wanna Be with You" (1989)

"I Wanna Have Some Fun" is a pop–dance song performed by British singer Samantha Fox. It was written and produced by Full Force and was released in the last quarter of 1988 as the first American single from Fox's third album, I Wanna Have Some Fun (1988). In the US, the single was certified gold, peaking at number 8 on the Billboard Hot 100 singles chart. In Europe and Australia, it was released as the album's third and final single in 1989.

The song samples Loleatta Holloway's song "Love Sensation" and Yazoo's "Situation". American drag queen Pandora Boxx released a cover of the song in 2012 featuring Tim Permanent.

== Critical reception ==
In an ironic review of 10 June 1989, the Betty Page, observer of British music newspaper Record Mirror, came to the conclusion that the pop-up gatefold sleeve of the single that she got was much more interesting than the music of the disc itself.

== Formats and track listings ==
- 7" single
1. "I Wanna Have Some Fun" (7" version) – 4:08
2. "Out of Our Hands" – 3:05
- UK / EU 12" single
1. "I Wanna Have Some Fun" (extended version) – 5:08
2. "Lovin' Don't Grow on Trees" – 4:11
3. "I Wanna Have Some Fun" (Have Some Fun mix) – 6:08
4. "Out of Our Hands" – 3:05
- US 12" single
1. "I Wanna Have Some Fun" (extended version) – 5:08
2. "I Wanna Have Some Fun" (UK single edit) – 4:08
3. "I Wanna Have Some Fun" (Full Force single edit) – 4:37
4. "I Wanna Have Some Fun" (Have Some Fun mix) – 6:08
5. "I Wanna Have Some Fun" (album version) – 5:03
6. "Don't Cheat on Me" – 3:04

== Charts ==
=== Weekly charts ===
Chart (1988–1989)	Peak position
Australia (ARIA)	80
Canada Top Singles (RPM)	16
Canada Dance/Urban (RPM)	7
Italy (Musica e dischi)	23
New Zealand (Recorded Music NZ)	22
Quebec (ADISQ)	2
UK Singles (Official Charts)	63
US Billboard Hot 100	8
US Dance Club Songs (Billboard)	2
US Hot Dance Singles Sales (Billboard)	1
US Hot R&B/Hip-Hop Songs (Billboard)	19
US Cash Box Top 100	19

=== Yead-end charts ===
Chart (1989)	Position
US Billboard Hot 100	87
US Dance Club Songs (Billboard)	42

== Certifications ==
Region	Certification	Certified units/sales
United States (RIAA)	Gold	500,000^{^}
^{^} Shipments figures based on certification alone.
