= Nayobe =

American singer

Nayobe Catalina Gomez, known professionally as Nayobe (born December 18, 1967, in Brooklyn, New York), is an American singer and freestyle dance-pop musician of Afro-Cuban heritage. Her most successful singles are "Good Things Come to Those Who Wait", "Second Chance for Love" and "It's Too Late", which reached positions Nos. 15, 30 and 5 on the Billboard Hot Dance Club Songs chart, respectively.

== Career ==
In the early part of 1985, Nayobe became the first Latin American female to record a freestyle song called "Please Don't Go", produced by Andy Panda. Some music critics declared her record the first song of the genre and of the whole Latin hip hop movement which later became known as freestyle music. Nayobe's other hits include "Guess I Fell In Love", "Good Things Come to Those Who Wait", "Second Chance for Love" and "Promise Me". Her second album, Promise Me, took her into a more urban contemporary and new jack swing direction with production by Teddy Riley. Nayobe returned with the self-titled salsa album in 1999.

== Discography ==
=== Studio albums ===
Year	Album details	Positions
Year	Album details	US R&B Albums
1986	Nayobe: Released: 1986; Label: Fever Records	—
1990	Promise Me: Released: 27 June 1990; Label: WTG Records	86
1997	Dame un Poco Mas: Released: 17 June 1997; Label: Sony Music Distribution	—
1999	Nayobe: Released: 23 November 1999; Label: Platano Records	—
"—" denotes a release that did not chart.

=== Singles ===
- 1984: "Please Don't Go"
- 1985: "School Girl Crush"
- 1985: "No Te Vayas"
- 1986: "Good Things Come To Those Who Wait"
- 1986: "Second Chance For Love"
- 1987: "Guess I Feel In Love"
- 1988: "It's Too Late"
- 1989: "Please Don't Go/ No Te Vayas"
- 1990: "I'll Be Around"
- 1990: "I Love The Way You Love Me"
- 1995: "All Night Long"
- 1997: "We Can Dance, We Can Fly"
- 1999: "Como Una Loba"
