= Jade Starling =

American singer

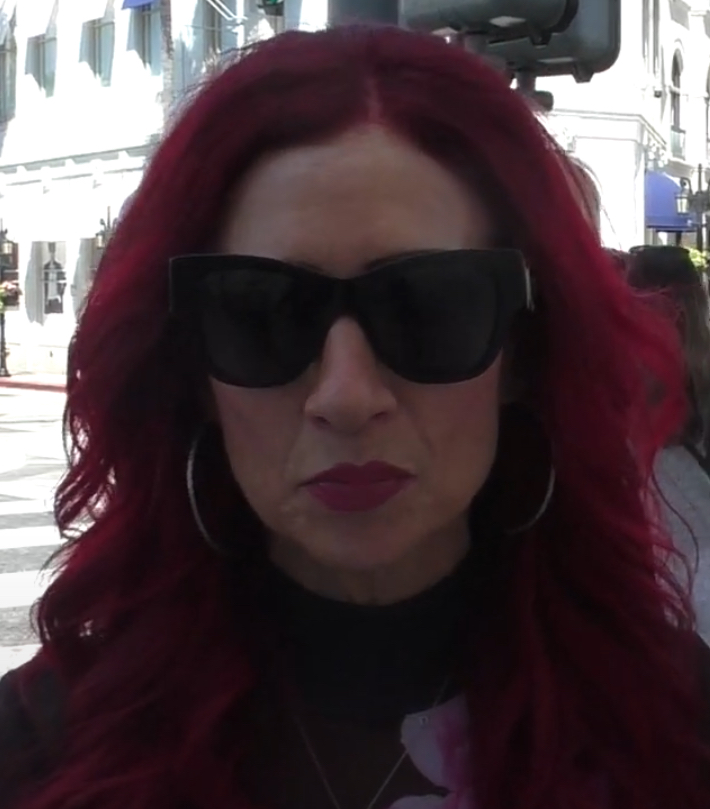
- Starling in 2024

Background information
- Genre: Pop
- Occupation: Singer
- Instrument: Vocals
- Years active: 1980s–present
- Label: Virgin (former)
- Website: www.prettypoisonmusic.com

Jade Starling (born January 19, 1960) is an American singer, and the lead vocalist for 1980s band Pretty Poison. She lives in New Jersey. Starling is a gay-rights activist and a supporter of same-sex marriage. She also sings songs in Spanish.

== Early life ==
Starling was born in Camden, New Jersey and raised in Merchantville, New Jersey. She decided to become a performer at 5 years old after winning a singing contest. Her parents were both musicians, with her father being a jazz guitarist and her mother being a pianist. Her first name is her real name while the last name Starling is her stage name.

== Philanthropy ==
Starling has worked as a gay-rights activist, performing on behalf of many gay-rights benefits including gay-rights parades and LGBTQ benefits. In 1997, her song "Let Freedom Ring" was used to help further the concept of legalizing gay marriage. She has also been active in the "Ball Community" through her work with Jay Blahnik.

== Musical career ==
=== Pretty Poison ===
Starling has appeared on various Billboard Charts 9 times since 1984. Topping the Dance/Club chart 3 times with 2 of those club hits crossing over to both the Pop and R&B Chart.

- 1984 – "Nightime" – No. 13 Dance Svengali Records
- 1987 – "Catch Me (I'm Falling)" – No. 1 Dance, No. 8 Pop, No. 13 R&B – Svengali/Virgin
- 1988 – "Nightime" – No. 1 Dance, No. 36 Pop, No. 64 R&B
- 1997 – "Let Freedom Ring" – No. 17 Dance
- 1998 – "Catch Me 98" – No. 43 Dance
- 1998 – "My Heart Will Go On" – No. 37 Dance
- 1998 – "Honey Brown" – #41 Dance
- 2013 – "Insomniak" – No. 31 Dance
- 2014 – "Think About U" – No. 14 Dance
- 2015 – "Better & Better" – No. 3 Dance

She has released 4 LPs since 1988.

- 1988 – Catch Me I'm Falling
- 1995 – Sex in Violets - Deflowered
- 1997 – Pretty Poison's Greatest Hits Vol. 1
- 1998 – Euphoria – very rare as it was recalled shortly after its release.
- 2014 – Captive – Jade Starling solo LP

Starling has received numerous awards along with Pretty Poison founder and long time co-writer Whey Cooler.
