= Pandisc Records =

American independent record label

Pandisc Records is an American independent record label founded in Miami, Florida, United States. Pandisc specializes in releasing Miami bass, electronic, and other bass and urban artists. CDs produced by Beat Dominator and Bass Mekanik on the Pandisc label are widely used for car audio competitions.

In 1989, Pandisc released bluesman Joey Gilmore's debut album, So Good to be Bad.

== Artists ==
- Afro-Rican
- Bass Mekanik
- Blowfly
- DJ Baby Anne
- DJ Laz
- Maggotron
- Planet Detroit
- Trinere
- Joey Gilmore
- Debbie Deb
- Young and Restless
- MC Nas-D & DJ Freaky Fred
- Beat Dominator
- 2 BMF
- Bad Ass Sound System (B.A.S.S.)
- Kinsu
- Clay D
- Crazy L'eggs
- Repo Crew
- The Puppies
- Bass Cube
- Splack Pack
- Eerk & Jerk
- Mental Block
- Funk'e Ray
- The Mad Rapper
- Dj David C.

== See also ==
- List of record labels

== Official website ==
- Pandisc.com - official website
