= Take Me in Your Arms (Lil Suzy song) =

Single by Lil Suzy

from the album Love Can't Wait
- Released: 1991
- Genre: Freestyle; dance; electro
- Length: 3:21
- Label: High Power
- Songwriters: John Romano; Julian Hernandez; Richard Miranda; Tony "Dr. Edit" Garcia
- Producer: Dr. Edit

Lil Suzy singles chronology
"Randy" (1988)	"Take Me in Your Arms" (1991)	"Falling in Love" (1992)

"Take Me in Your Arms" is a song by freestyle singer Lil Suzy. Released as a single in 1991 from the album Love Can't Wait, it reached No. 67 on the Billboard Hot 100 and No. 4 on the Canadian dance chart.

== Tracks ==
Germany CD single

No.	Title	Length
1.	"Take Me in Your Arms" (Radio Edit)	3:21
2.	"Love Can't Wait" (Club Version)	4:33
3.	"Take Me in Your Arms" (Club Version)	5:07
4.	"Take Me in Your Arms" (House Version)	5:08

US 12" single

No.	Title	Length
1.	"Take Me in Your Arms" (Club Version)	5:23
2.	"Take Me in Your Arms" (MultiMilanaire Bay Area Rich Boy MCE Empire Records Redub)	5:13
3.	"Take Me in Your Arms" (Radio Edit)	3:25
4.	"Love Can't Wait" (Club Version)	4:37
5.	"Love Can't Wait" (Radio Version)	4:05

== Charts ==
=== Weekly charts ===
Chart (1992)	Peak position
US Billboard Hot 100	67
Chart (1993)
Canada RPM Dance	4

=== Year-end charts ===
Chart (1993)	Position
Canada RPM Top 50 Dance Tracks	47
