= Bass Mekanik =

American musician

- Genres: Miami bass, electro
- Years active: 1994–present
- Labels: Pandisc, Radial by The Orchard
- Members: Neil Case, DJ Billy E
- Website: www.BassMekanik.com

Bass Mekanik (b. Neil Case, Jamaica) is a Miami bass DJ first released in 1994 on Pandisc Records. Bass Mekanik has been active for over two decades, producing 10 studio albums, 3 singles, and a DVD. He then started his own record label in 2009 called Bass Mekanik Records and produced an album called 808.

== Early career ==
The first two years of his DJ career (1992–1994), he went by the alias Beat Dominator. Neil Case is considered to be one of the driving forces of Bass Music.

As the mobile audio scene grew exponentially, sanctioning bodies such as Midwestspl and IASCA and MECA Mobile Electronics Competition Association bodies utilized the Bass Mekanik Quad Maximus and Bass Mekanik 5.0 to measure SPL (sound pressure levels) and frequency responses in each vehicle to declare a winner.

He has also gone by the aliases:

- Beat Dominator
- Bass Cube (along with James McCauley aka DXJ)
- Bass Trip
- Bass Tribe (along with Keith Rosenburg and James McCauley)
- Bass Incorporated (along with Keith Rosenburg)

Neil has also collaborated with DJ Billy E as the transition from Miami Bass to Techno Bass took shape.

DJ Billy E DJ Billy E is one of the legends of the Bass Music World, a status earned via his 22 years of experience releasing bass CDs like Nightmare on Bass Street and Tuner Beats, and for his work as half of the production duo Bass Mekanik.

It all started in 1986 for the then 12-year-old Billy E when he got an after school job at a Jupiter Florida car audio store and began learning how to install and design car audio systems with multiple subwoofers and amplifiers. Billy would make mix tapes of Miami Bass records and play them in the sound room to help sell subwoofers. The shop purchased turntables and a mixer to start a DJ service, and encouraged Billy to try it out. Billy discovered he had a natural talent for beat mixing and scratching and soon after met a group of local DJs that were doing the same thing including making their own Miami Bass beats. One of these people was Jim Jonsin, then known as Jealous J. J made Billy his first bass beat and taught him how to use the drum machines to make Bass Music. A short while after this Billy partnered with friend and Orion Car Audio rep Ed Firestone. Ed had just started a new car audio bass label called IBP and Billy was signed immediately to make his first solo CD, Nightmare on Bass Street. The CD was a hit, selling 75 thousand copies in the first 5 months, and caught the attention of Miami Bass Label, Pandisc Records. It was here that Billy met Neil Case. Neil had an idea for a new style of car audio bass CD that would include test tones to set up audio systems properly. This was the birth of the Bass Mekanik Series of releases. Neil and Billy continue to release albums under the Bass Mekanik name and have sold about a million copies of these CDs.

One of Billy's most recent hits, Tuner Beats, received play on MTV's Pimp My Ride series. The show used a song from Tuner Beats called "Beats 4 My Van".

== Discography ==
=== Studio albums ===
| Year | Album | Label |
|---|---|---|
| 1994 | "Quad Maximus" | Pandisc Records |
| 1995 | "Max Killa Hertz" | Pandisc Records |
| 1997 | "Audio Toolbox" | Pandisc Records |
| 1998 | "Sonic Overload" | Pandisc Records |
| 1999 | "V 5.0" | Pandisc Records |
| 2000 | "Powerbox The Bassest Hits" | Pandisc Records |
| 2001 | "Flow:Music & Beyond" | Pandisc Records |
| 2001 | "Download" | Pandisc Records |
| 2002 | "Faster Harder Louder" | Pandisc Records |
| 2004 | "The Remix Album" | Pandisc Records |
| 2007 | "Boom Style" | Pandisc Records |
| 2009 | "808" | Bass Mekanik Records |
| 2013 | Kontrol | Bass Mekanik Records |

=== Singles ===
| Year | Album | Label |
|---|---|---|
| 1998 | "Rock Dis Joint" | Pandisc Records |
| 2000 | "Bass Mechanic" | Pandisc Records |
| 2001 | "Do It" | Pandisc Records |

== Later career ==
In 2001 Neil Case started his own record label.
