= David Waxman =

- Also known as: Afrowax
- Born: David Waxman; New York City, New York, United States
- Genres: Electronic, house
- Occupations: Disc jockey, remixer, producer
- Years active: 1992-present
- Label: Ultra Records
- Website: www.davidwaxman.com

David Waxman is a DJ, remixer and producer.

== Career ==
Waxman made his professional debut at the Roxy in 1992. He has been resident DJ at numerous world-renowned clubs such as Liquid, Miami (1996–1998), Twilo, NY (1998–2000), and Crobar Chicago, Miami, NY (2002–2005). He became widely known for bootleg remixes of hits such as Beck's "New Pollution," Queen's "Another One Bites the Dust," Nine Inch Nails' "Closer to God," and AC/DC's "Dirty Deeds" among other worldwide smashes. In addition, he recorded under the moniker of Afrowax the 1997 club/dance hit "English 101 (Can You Understand English?)". In addition to his artistic career, Waxman currently holds the position of General Manager at Ultra Records.

== Discography ==
=== Albums ===
- 2001: Welcome to New York

=== Mixed compilations ===
- 2001: Ultra.Chilled 01
- 2002: Ultra.Chilled 02
- 2002: Ultra.80's vs Electro
- 2002: Ultra.Chilled 03
- 2002: Ultra.Trance:1
- 2003: Ministry of Sound: American Anthems
- 2003: Ministry of Sound: The Annual 2004
- 2003: Club Nation 2002, Vol. 2
- 2003: Ultra.Chilled 04
- 2003: Ultra.Club Classics: '90s
- 2003: Ultra.Trance:2
- 2004: Ultra.Dance 05
- 2004: Ministry of Sound: The Annual 2005
- 2005: Ministry of Sound: The Annual 2006
- 2005: Ultra.Chilled 05
- 2005: Ultra.Weekend
- 2006: Ultra Electro
- 2007: Ultra Electro 2
- 2007: Ultra.10
- 2008: Ultra.Dance 09
- 2009: Just Dance
- 2009: Ultra Hits - #75 The Billboard 200
- 2009: Ultra Electro 3
- 2009: Just Dance 2

=== Singles/EPs ===
==== as Afrowax ====
- 1997: "English 101 (Can You Understand English?)"
- 1997: "What is Your Problem?"
- 1998: "Do You Want More?"

==== as David Waxman ====
- 2009: "Can You Understand English?"
- 2010: "Flood (Lift Me Up)"

=== Selected remixes ===
- "I Want Your Soul" - Armand Van Helden
- "New Pollution" - Beck
- "Moving Into Light" - Black Fras
- "We Got the Beats" - Go Go Boy
- "Yeah... Right" - Jonah
- "Beachball" - Nalin & Kane
- "Closer to God" - Nine Inch Nails
- "All I Know" - Orielle
- "Another One Bites the Dust" - Queen
