= Trinere =

American musician

- Born: Trinere Veronica Farrington; November 29, 1964 (age 61); Miami, Florida, U.S.
- Genres: Freestyle, Miami bass, electro
- Years active: 1984–present
- Labels: Pandisc, Luke Records, Warlock Records

Trinere Veronica Farrington (born November 29, 1964, in Miami, Florida), better known as Trinere, is an American singer, songwriter and recording artist who had several major dance hits in the 1980s and early '90s and who was very influential in the freestyle music genre. Today these songs are considered classics of the freestyle genre. Trinere continues to perform live and numerous concerts throughout New York, Florida, Santa Fe Springs, California, Brazil, and other venues in Latin America. Her popularity is still going strong and has gained fans of younger generations. She is making an effort at crossing over to Jazz music in order to showcase her versatility and range.

== Music career ==
=== Childhood and career beginnings ===
Trinere recorded with several record companies, mostly out of Miami, Florida, known for its output of popular freestyle music. Trinere's music was mostly produced by popular Miami DJ, "Pretty Tony" Butler. Many consider her the "Queen of Freestyle". Her most notable chart successes were her single "I'll Be All You Ever Need", which raced up the Hot Dance/Disco 12-Inch Singles Sales and Club Play charts in the summer of 1986, and her 1991 album Forever Yours, which reached the Top 40 on Billboard's Top R&B Albums chart for several weeks.

A Miami native, she always wanted to sing professionally since the age of five. After graduating from high school, Trinere went on to study music at the University of Miami, Florida.

Trinere was influenced and inspired by singers such as Donna Summer, Natalie Cole, Phyllis Hyman, Madonna, Janet Jackson and Teena Marie. During college, Trinere was the lead vocalist for a popular band in Coconut Grove, Florida, called Euphoria. Upon finishing her studies at the University of Miami, Trinere spent some time working with the music artist Rick James and his group the Mary Jane Girls.

In 1984, Trinere met famed dance, freestyle and electro/hip-hop producer Tony Butler in Miami. Pretty Tony crossed genres and experimented with producing freestyle music with Trinere. Trinere's dynamic voice and Pretty Tony's ability to incorporate sounds captivated and solidified a large Latin fanbase, which spread across the U.S., Europe and South America.

Her first release was the single "I Know You Love Me" in 1984; this was re-released two years later. The following year, Trinere released the popular songs "All Night" and "Can't Get Enough", followed by "How Can We Be Wrong". A remix for "All Night" was also released.

Trinere began to tour extensively, selling millions of records around the world, and having a number of dance chart hits.

=== 1986–1992 ===
Music Specialists/Jam Packed Records of Miami released her self-titled debut album in 1986. The album contained not only the previous hits she had already released but also several other tracks which would become classic freestyle anthems, "They’re Playing Our Song" and "I'll Be All You Ever Need".

Pandisc Records released two more of Trinere's singles, including "Can’t Stop The Beat", which was her biggest hit for Pandisc.

She released three more albums between 1990 and 1992: Forever Yours (1990), Games (1991) and Trinere's in the House! (1992).

Trinere and Pretty Tony had a son, Brandon C. Butler. In 1996, Trinere released "When I Hear Music", a remix of another Pretty Tony production with Debbie Deb.

=== Present day ===
Trinere has continued to perform live internationally, often joining fellow freestyle artists such as Lisa Lisa, Stevie B, among others. Her current album, titled Timeless, is in the process of being recorded with son Brandon Christopher, better known as Miami Marci.

== Discography ==
=== Studio albums ===
| Year | Album | Label |
|---|---|---|
| 1986 | Trinere | Jam Packed Records |
| 1990 | Forever Yours | Pandisc Records |
| 1991 | Games | Luke Records |
| 1992 | Trinere's in the House! | Pandisc Records |
| 1996 | Celebrating 10 (compilation) | Warlock Records |
| 1997 | All Night (Greatest Hits) (compilation) | Jam Packed Records |
| 2005 | Anthology: The Complete Hits Collection (compilation) | Pandisc Records |

=== Singles ===
| Year | Single | Positions | | Album |
| Year | Single | R&B/Hip-Hop | Dance | Album |
|---|---|---|---|---|
| 1984 | "I Know You Love Me" | - | - | Trinere |
| 1985 | "All Night" | 68 | - | Trinere |
| 1985 | "Can't Get Enough" | - | - | Trinere |
| 1986 | "I'll Be All You Ever Need" | 32 | 5 | Trinere |
| 1986 | "How Can We Be Wrong" | 69 | 15 | Trinere |
| 1986 | "I Know You Love Me" | 69 | - | Trinere |
| 1987 | "They're Playing Our Song" | 67 | 13 | Trinere |
| 1989 | "Can't Stop the Beat" | - | 46 | Greatest Hits |
| 1990 | "I Wanted You" | 82 | - | Forever Yours |
| 1991 | "Games" | 75 | - | Games |
| 1991 | "It's the Music" | - | - | Games |
| 1992 | "Alone at Last" | - | - | Trinere's in the House! |
| 1993 | "Rockin' to the Rhythm" | - | - | Trinere's in the House! |
| 1996 | "When I Hear Music" | - | - | Celebrating 10 |
