= Memories (Netzwerk song) =

1995 song by Netzwerk

"Memories" is a dance music song written by Fulvio Perniola, Gianni Bini, Marco Galeotti and Maurizio Tognarelli and originally recorded and released by the group Netzwerk in 1995. The song was a hit in dance clubs around the world.

== Track listing ==
Memories (Remix) - Italy 12 "Single

No.	Title	Length
1.	"Memories" (Enola Remix)	6:30
2.	"Memories" (Kama Vocal Mix)	7:47
3.	"Memories" (Underground Mix)	5:17

, Germany / Canada / Italy CD Maxi-single

No.	Title	Length
1.	"Memories" (Radio Edit)	3:58
2.	"Memories" (Extended 12 "Mix)	6:30
3.	"Memories" (E.U.R.O. mix)	4:55
4.	"I Feel Love" (Club Mix)	5:25
5.	"Memories" (Acappella)	3:58

== Lil Suzy version ==
In 1997, Lil Suzy covered "Memories" for her fourth album Paradise. It was released as the second single from the album on November 11, 1997, and reached No. 5 on the Bubbling Under Hot 100 Singles chart.

=== Track listing ===
US 12" single

No.	Title	Length
1.	"Memories" (Original Club)
2.	"Memories" (Mainstream Club)
3.	"Memories" (Suzyappella)
4.	"Memories" (Hideout House Mix)
5.	"Memories" (Hideout Dub)
6.	"Memories" (European Vacation Mix)
