= Netzwerk (band) =

Italian Eurodance project

- Origin: Italy
- Genres: Eurodance
- Years active: 1992-1997, 2019-Present
- Labels: DWA (Dance World Attack)
- Members: Marco Galeotti; Simona Jackson; Sandra Chambers
- Past members: Fulvio Perniola; Marco Genovesi; Gianni Bini; Maurizio Tognarelli; Sharon May Linn

Netzwerk is an Italian Eurodance project formed in 1992. They released six singles, two of which were top 10 hits in Italy. A comeback single was released after more than 20 years of inactivity on October 11, 2019, entitled Just Another Dream.

The project has featured three different vocalists. Sandra Chambers provided the vocals on "Send Me an Angel" and "Breakdown". Simona Jackson provided the vocals on "Passion" and "Memories". Sharon May Linn provided the vocals on "Dream".

In 2019, Jackson returned to Netzwerk after nearly 25 years to provide the lead vocals for their comeback single "Just Another Dream", and performs at 90s Revival Shows around the world as Netzwerk. Two years later in 2021, Netzwerk released "Last Summer", a duet featuring Jackson and former fellow vocalist Sandy Chambers.

== Discography ==
=== Singles ===
Year	Single	Peak chart positions
Year	Single	ITA
1992	"Send Me an Angel"	—
1993	"Breakdown"	—
1994	"Passion"	9
1995	"Memories"	2
1997	"Dream"	—
2019	"Just Another Dream"	—
2021	"Last Summer"	—
"—" denotes releases that did not chart
