= Louie DeVito =

- Born: Louis DeVito
- Origin: New York City, U.S.
- Genres: Dance, house, trance, freestyle
- Occupations: DJ, producer
- Labels: E-Lastik Recordings; Dee Vee Music; Pacha Recordings; Ultra Records
- Website: www.djlouiedevito.com

Louie DeVito is an American dance DJ and producer based in New York City. He is best known for his mix series, NYC Underground Party (Volumes 1–8).

== Biography ==
DeVito first gained popularity DJing in New York City, Long Island and Jersey Shore area clubs, where he was a favorite of many young people. DeVito is known for bringing commercial house and dance hits to the masses, including those who do not generally follow this type of music, with his compilations.

DeVito has been a resident of Manalapan Township, New Jersey.

== Discography ==
- NYC Underground Party (11 January 2000)
- NYC Underground Party, Vol. 2 (11 July 2000)
- NYC Underground Party, Vol. 3 (28 November 2000)
- NYC Underground Party, Vol. 4 (16 October 2001)
- Dance Factory (23 April 2002)
- Trance Sessions (30 July 2002)
- NYC Underground Party, Vol. 5 (5 November 2002)
- Dance Divas (15 April 2003)
- Dance Factory: Level 2 (17 June 2003)
- Ultra.Dance 04 (26 August 2003)
- NYC Underground Party, Vol. 6 (18 November 2003)
- Dance Divas, Vol. 2 (2 March 2004)
- Dance Factory: Level 3 (31 August 2004)
- Trance Sessions II (5 April 2005)
- Deeper & Harder, Vol. 2 (12 July 2005)
- NYC Underground Party, Vol. 7 (1 November 2005)
- Dance Factory: Level 4 (11 July 2006)
- Deeper & Harder, Vol. 3 (21 November 2006)
- Pacha New York (20 November 2007)
- NYC Underground Party, Vol. 8 (6 May 2008)
- The New Dance Mix USA (12 October 2010)
- The New Dance Mix USA, Vol. 2 (1 November 2011)
- Elimidate (Unknown)
