= Freestyle music =

Electronic dance music genre

Freestyle Music
- Other names: Freestyle, Latin freestyle, Latin hip-hop, Latin rap
- Stylistic origins: Dance-pop; Latin music; electro; boogie; hip-hop; synth-pop; hi-NRG; post-disco
- Cultural origins: Early 1980s, United States: New York City and Miami (mostly by Hispanic Americans and Italian Americans)
- Derivative forms: NYC hard house

Regional scenes
- New York City; Philadelphia; Miami; Los Angeles; Detroit; Chicago

Other topics
- Freestyle musicians; Latin pop; Dance-pop; Miami bass

Freestyle music (also known as freestyle, Latin freestyle or Latin hip-hop, and sometimes Latin rap) is a form of electronic dance music that emerged in New York City, primarily among Puerto Rican Americans and Italian Americans.

An important precursor to freestyle is 1982's "Planet Rock" by Afrika Bambaataa & Soul Sonic Force. Shannon's 1983 hit "Let the Music Play" is often considered the first freestyle song and the first major song recorded by a Latin American artist is "Please Don't Go" by Nayobe from 1984. From there, freestyle gained a large presence in American night clubs, especially in states such as New York, Pennsylvania, Massachusetts, Florida, California, and Illinois. Radio airplay followed in the mid-1980s.

Performers such as Lisa Lisa and Cult Jam, Exposé, Stevie B and Sweet Sensation gained mainstream chart success with the genre in the 1980s, but its popularity largely faded by the early 1990s. Both classic and newer freestyle output remain popular as a niche genre in Brazil (where it is an influence on funk carioca), Germany and Canada.

== History ==
=== 1982–1987: Origin ===
Freestyle music developed in the early 1980s, primarily simultaneously in the Hispanic (mainly Puerto Rican/Latin) communities of Upper Manhattan, Brooklyn, and The Bronx and in the Italian-American communities in Brooklyn, the Bronx, other boroughs of New York City, New Jersey, Westchester County and Long Island. It initially was a fusion of synthetic instrumentation and syncopated percussion of 1980s electro, as favored by fans of breakdancing. Sampling, as found in synth-pop music and hip-hop, was incorporated. Key influences include Afrika Bambaataa & Soul Sonic Force's "Planet Rock" (1982) and Shannon's "Let the Music Play" (1983), the latter was a top-ten Billboard Hot 100 hit.

In 1984, a Latin presence was established when the first song recorded in the genre by a Latin American artist, "Please Don't Go", by newcomer Nayobe (a singer from Brooklyn and of Cuban descent) was recorded and released. The song became a success, reaching No. 23 on the Billboard Hot Dance Music/Club Play chart. In 1985, a Spanish version of the song was released with the title "No Te Vayas". By 1987, freestyle began getting more airplay on American pop radio stations.

Songs such as "Come Go with Me" by Exposé, "Show Me" by the Cover Girls, "Fascinated" by Company B, "Silent Morning" by Noel, and "Catch Me (I'm Falling)" by Pretty Poison, brought freestyle into the mainstream. House music, based partly on disco rhythms, was by 1992 challenging the relatively upbeat, syncopated freestyle sound. Pitchfork considers the Miami Mix of ABC's single "When Smokey Sings" to be proto-freestyle, despite that version being released in 1987.

Many early or popular freestyle artists and DJs were of Hispanic or Italian descent, including Jellybean, Tony Torres, Raul Soto, Roman Ricardo, Mickey Garcia (who is of both Italian and Puerto Rican descent), Lil Suzy, and Nocera, which was one reason for the style's popularity among Hispanic Americans and Italian Americans in the New York City area and Philadelphia.

=== 1988: Pop crossover ===
Freestyle's Top 40 Radio airplay started to really take off by 1987, and it began to disappear from the airwaves in the early 1990s as radio stations moved to Top 40-only formats. Artists such as George Lamond, Exposé, Sweet Sensation, and Stevie B were still heard on mainstream radio, but other notable freestyle artists did not fare as well. Carlos Berrios and Platinum producer Frankie Cutlass used a freestyle production on "Temptation" by Corina and "Together Forever" by Lisette Melendez. The songs were released in 1991, almost simultaneously, and caused a resurgence in the style when they were embraced by Top 40 radio. "Temptation" reached the number 6 spot on the Billboard Hot 100 Chart. These hits were followed by the success of Lisa Lisa and Cult Jam, who had been one of the earliest freestyle acts. Their records were produced by Full Force, which had also worked with UTFO and James Brown.

Several primarily freestyle artists released ballads during the 1980s and early 1990s that crossed over to the pop charts and charted higher than their previous work. These include "Seasons Change" by Exposé, "Thinking of You" by Sa-Fire, "One More Try" by Timmy T, "Because I Love You (The Postman Song)" by Stevie B, and "If Wishes Came True" by Sweet Sensation. Brenda K. Starr reached the Hot 100 with her ballad "I Still Believe".

Freestyle shortly thereafter gave way to mainstream pop artists such as MC Hammer, Paula Abdul, Bobby Brown, New Kids on the Block, and Milli Vanilli, with some artists utilizing elements of freestyle beginning in the 1980s) using hip-hop beats and electro samples in a mainstream form with slicker production and MTV-friendly videos. These artists were successful on crossover stations as well as R&B stations, and freestyle was replaced as an underground genre by newer styles such as new jack swing, trance and Eurodance. Despite this, some freestyle acts managed to garner hits well into the 1990s, with acts such as Cynthia and Rockell scoring minor hits on the Billboard Hot 100 as late as 1998. As this new music style took over many big cities in America, the labels that signed these artists such as Columbia, Warner Bros., and other labels did not know how to market these artists originally.

Instead of pushing this style of music as a solidified sound, the labels separated the cities. This caused the Miami sound of freestyle music to be more popularized through the radio compared to NYC's sound at the time. The labels who pushed out low quality tracks ended up hurting themselves, instead of making the track a quality piece of music.

=== Post-Freestyle-Era ===
Freestyle remained a largely underground genre with a sizable following in New York, but has recently seen a comeback in the cities where the music originally experienced its greatest success. New York City impresario Steve Sylvester and producer Sal Abbatiello of Fever Records launched Stevie Sly's Freestyle Party show at the Manhattan live music venue, Coda on April 1, 2004. The show featured Judy Torres, Cynthia, and the Cover Girls and was attended by several celebrity guests.

The Coda show was successful, and was followed by a summer 2006 Madison Square Garden concert that showcased freestyle's most successful performers. New freestyle releases are popular with enthusiasts and newcomers alike. Miami rapper Pitbull collaborated with Miami freestyle artist Stevie B to create an updated version of Stevie B's hit, "Spring Love". Also in 2017, platinum producer Frankie Cutlass brought it back to his Monday night show called the Monday Night Freestyle Classics on all social media platforms.

Currently, in 2026, freestyle music continues to have a thriving fanbase in certain parts of the country, with New York City Latino and Italian-American DJs such as Frankie Cutlass , Bad Boy Joe and Louie DeVito helping to maintain an active freestyle scene in the NYC metro area. The music is available internationally on AccuRadio (Latin Freestyle channel).

== Influence on other genres ==
=== NYC hard house ===
As Latin freestyle in the late 1980s and early 1990s gradually became superseded with house music, dance-pop, and regular hip-hop on one front and Spanish-language pop music with marginal Latin freestyle influences on another, "harder strain" of house music originating in New York City was known to incorporate elements of Latin freestyle and the old school hip-hop sound. Principal architects of the genre were Todd Terry (early instances include "Alright Alright," and "Dum Dum Cry") and Nitro Deluxe. Deluxe's "This Brutal House," fusing Latin percussion and the New York electro sound of Man Parrish with brash house music, proved to have an impact on the United Kingdom's club music scene, presaging the early 1990s British rave scene.

=== Terminology ===
The genre was recognized as a subgenre of hip-hop in the mid-1980s. It was dominated by "hard" electro beats of the type used primarily at the time in hip-hop music. Freestyle was more appreciated in larger cities.

== Freestyle scenes ==
=== New York ===
"Let the Music Play" by Shannon, is often named as the genre's first hit, and its sound, called "The Shannon Sound", as the foundation of the genre, although also known as the beginnings of the electro genre which then gave birth to techno. Afrika Bambaataa's "Planet Rock" was arguably the first freestyle song produced. "Let the Music Play" eventually became freestyle's biggest hit, and still receives frequent airplay. Its producers Chris Barbosa and Mark Liggett changed and redefined the electro funk sound with the addition of Latin-American rhythms and a syncopated drum-machine sound.

In March 2013, Radio City Music Hall hosted a freestyle concert. Top freestyle artists included in the line-up were TKA, Safire, Judy Torres, Cynthia, Cover Girls, Lisa Lisa, Shannon, Noel, and Lisette Melendez. Originally scheduled as a one-night event, a second night was added shortly after the first night was sold out in a matter of days.

=== Miami ===
Radio stations nationwide began to play hits by artists like TKA, Sweet Sensation, Exposé, and Sa-Fire on the same playlists as Michael Jackson and Madonna. "(You Are My) All and All" by Joyce Sims became the first freestyle record to cross over into the R&B market, and was one of the first to reach the European market. Radio station WPOW/Power 96 was noted for exposing freestyle to South Florida in the mid-'80s through the early '90s, as well as mixing in some local Miami bass into its playlist.

'Pretty Tony' Butler produced several hits on Miami's Jam-Packed Records, including Debbie Deb's "When I Hear Music" and "Lookout Weekend", and Trinere's "I'll Be All You'll Ever Need" and "They're Playing Our Song". Company B, Stevie B, Paris by Air, Linear, Will to Power and Exposé's later hits defined Miami freestyle. Tolga Katas is credited as one of the first people to create a hit record entirely on a computer, and produced Stevie B's "Party Your Body", "In My Eyes" and "Dreamin' of Love". Katas' record label Futura Records was an incubator for artists such as Linear, who achieved international success after a move from Futura to Atlantic Records.

=== Philadelphia ===
The groundbreaking "Nightime" by Pretty Poison featuring red headed diva Jade Starling in 1984 initially put Philadelphia on the freestyle map. Their follow-up "Catch Me I'm Falling" was a worldwide hit and brought freestyle to American Bandstand, Soul Train, Solid Gold and the Arsenio Hall Show. "Catch Me I'm Falling" broke on the street during the summer of 1987 and was the #1 single at WCAU (98 Hot Hits) and #2 at WUSL (Power 99) during the first two weeks of July. Virgin Records was quick to sign Pretty Poison helping to usher in the avalanche of other major label signings from the expanding freestyle scene.

Several freestyle acts followed on the heels of Pretty Poison emerging from the metropolitan Philadelphia, PA area in the early 1990s, benefiting from both the clubs and the overnight success of then-Dance friendly Rhythmic Top 40 WIOQ. Artists such as T.P.E. (The Philadelphia Experiment) enjoyed regional success.

=== California ===
Freestyle had a notable following in California, especially Los Angeles, the Inland Empire, the Central Valley, San Francisco Bay, and San Diego. California's large Latino community enjoyed the sounds of America's East Coast club scene, and a number of California artists became popular with East Coast freestyle enthusiasts. In Northern California, primarily San Francisco and San Jose, they leaned toward a similar rhythm dance to hi-NRG, so most of the Californian freestyle emerged from the southern regions of the Bay Area and Los Angeles.

Timmy T, Bernadette, Buffy, Caleb-B, SF Spanish Fly, Angelina, One Voice, M:G, Stephanie Fastro and The S Factor were from the Bay Area.

The Filipino American community in California also embraced freestyle music during the late 1980s and early 1990s. Jaya was one of the first Filipino-American freestyle singers, reaching number 44 in 1990 with "If You Leave Me Now".

=== Canada ===
Freestyle's popularity spread outward from the Greater Toronto Area's Italian, Hispanic/Latino and Greek populations in the late 1980s and early 1990s. It was showcased alongside house music in various Toronto nightclubs, but by the mid-1990s was replaced almost entirely by house music.

Lil' Suzy released several 12-inch singles and performed live on the Canadian live dance music television program Electric Circus. Montreal singer Nancy Martinez's 1986 single "For Tonight" would become the first Canadian freestyle single to reach the top 40 on the Billboard Hot 100 chart, while the Montreal girl group 11:30 reached the Canadian chart with "Ole Ole" in 2000.

=== Elsewhere in the world ===
Performers and producers associated with the style also came from around the world, including Turkish-American Murat Konar (the writer and singer of Information Society's "Running"), Paul Lekakis from Greece, Asian artist Leonard (Leon Youngboy) who released the song "Youngboys", and British musicians including Freeez, Paul Hardcastle, Samantha Fox (whose singles "Naughty Girls (Need Love Too)", "Love House" and "I Wanna Have Some Fun" were all top 10 chart hits), and even Robin Gibb of the Bee Gees, who also adopted the freestyle sound in his 1984 album Secret Agent, having worked with producer Chris Barbosa.

Several British new wave and synth-pop bands also teamed up with freestyle producers or were influenced by the genre, and released freestyle songs or remixes. These include Duran Duran whose song "Notorious" was remixed by the Latin Rascals, and whose album Big Thing contained several freestyle inspired songs such as "All She Wants Is"; New Order who teamed up with Arthur Baker, producing and co-writing the track "Confusion"; Erasure and the Der Deutsche mixes of their song "Blue Savannah"; and the Pet Shop Boys, whose song "Domino Dancing" was produced by Miami-based freestyle producer Lewis Martineé. Australian act I'm Talking utilized freestyle elements into their singles "Trust Me" and "Do You Wanna Be?", both becoming top ten hits in their native Australia.

== Record labels ==
Prehistory

- Salsoul Records

Golden age Latin freestyle era

- Sleeping Bag Records
- Cutting Records
- MicMac Records
- Fever Records
- Profile Records

== See also ==
- Category:Freestyle musicians
- Category:Freestyle music albums
