= Gladys Tignor Peterson =

American educator

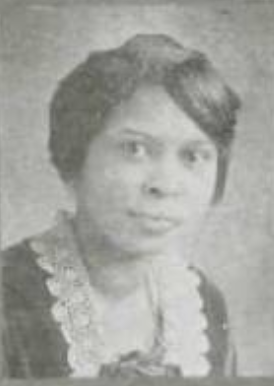
- Gladys Tignor Peterson, from the 1922 yearbook of Howard University's Law School
- Born: July 11, 1898; Washington, D.C.
- Died: May 1985 (aged 86)
- Occupation: Educator

Gladys E. Tignor Peterson (July 11, 1898 – May 1985) was an American educator. She worked as a teacher, principal, and administrator in the Washington, D.C. schools for over forty years, until she retired in 1962.

== Early life and education ==
Tignor was born in Washington, the daughter of Dr. William L. Tignor. She came from a family of professionals. Her father and uncle were medical doctors, and two other uncles were lawyers. Her aunt Sadie Tignor Henson was a truant officer and labor organizer in Washington, D.C. who worked closely with Nannie Helen Burroughs. Her younger half-brother Madison W. Tignor was an educator in Washington.

Tignor trained as a teacher at Miner Normal School and graduated from Howard University School of Law (HUSL) in 1922. She was a member of the Alpha Kappa Alpha sorority. In 1920 she was a founding member of Epsilon Sigma Iota, an organization for HUSL's women graduates, along with Bertha C. McNeill, Lillian Skinker, and Zephyr Moore. She completed a master's degree at Howard University in 1934, and doctoral studies in education at Teachers College, Columbia University in 1949. She was described in later reports as "the first Negro woman to receive a doctoral degree in secondary school administration from Columbia University."

== Career ==
Peterson was the principal of Randall Junior High School in the 1940s. In 1949, she became assistant to Garnet C. Wilkinson and his successor, Harold A. Haynes, assistant Superintendents of Schools in Washington, D.C. She spoke at a United Community Services conference in 1950, and reviewed entries in a drill contest held at Dunbar High School. In 1952 she applied for the position of Associate Superintendent of Negro Vocational and Junior High Schools in the Washington public school system, at which time she gave her credentials including her law degree and doctorate, "a total of 33½ years experience in the school system", as a teacher, principal, and administrator. In 1955, she spoke on a panel about education at Howard University. In 1958, after the district's schools began desegregation, she became assistant to Lawson J. Cantrell, deputy superintendent for school management and supervision. In 1960, she became executive assistant to the Superintendent of Schools Carl F. Hansen. She retired from school administration work in 1962. In retirement, she became a member of the District of Columbia's Citizens Advisory Unit.

== Publications ==
Peterson's writing on education policy appeared in scholarly journals including The Journal of Negro Education and Teachers College Record. She also contributed an article about Lucy Ella Moten to the biographical dictionary Notable American Women, 1607 to 1950.

- "The Present Status of the Negro Separate School as Defined by Court Decisions" (1935)
- "Legal aspects of separation of races in the public schools" (1935, with Maurice L. Risen)
- "More on Segregation Issue" (1946)
- "The Improvement of Instruction at the Eliza Randall Junior High School" (1950)

== Personal life ==
Tignor married her Howard University law school classmate George W. Peterson in 1921. She died in 1985, at the age of 86.
