= List of ambassadors of Saint Kitts and Nevis to Taiwan =

Coordinates: 25.117193°N 121.524186°E

Ambassador of Saint Kitts and Nevis to Taiwan
- Incumbent; Donya Lynex Francis since November 2022
- Inaugural holder: Jasmine Elise Huggins
- Formation: December 2007

The Kittitian and Nevisian ambassadrice in Taipei is the official representative of the Government in Basseterre to the Government of Taiwan.

== List of representatives ==
| Diplomatic agrément/Diplomatic accreditation | Ambassador | Observations | List of prime ministers of Saint Kitts and Nevis | List of premiers of the Republic of China | Term end |
|---|---|---|---|---|---|
| October 9, 1983 | | The governments in Basseterre and Taipei established diplomatic relations. | Kennedy Simmonds | Sun Yun-suan | |
| December 2007 | Jasmine Elise Huggins | She was graduated at the Howard University School of Law in Washington D.C.; Till December 2007 she was employed at the Embassy and Permanent mission of St. Kitts and Nevis in Washington D.C. As Alternate Representative to the Organization of American States and part of the CARICOM Alternates group, she led in negotiating Inter-American declarations, conventions and resolutions in the Councils and Committees of the OAS.; In December 2007 as Chargé d’affaires established the Embassy of St. Kitts and Nevis in Taipei.; In 2009 she was appointed Ambassador Extraordinary and Plenipotentiary.; In 2022, she was removed from her position | Denzil Douglas Timothy Harris | Chang Chun-hsiung Liu Chao-shiuan Wu Den-yih Chen Chun Jiang Yi-huah Mao Chi-kuo Chang San-cheng Lin Chuan Lai Ching-te Su Tseng-chang | |
| November 2, 2022 | Donya Lynex Francis | Officially appointed to the position on November 8 2022 | Terrance Drew | Su Tseng-chang Chen Chien-jen Cho Jung-tai | |
