= Lisa Fairfax =

American legal scholar (born 1970)

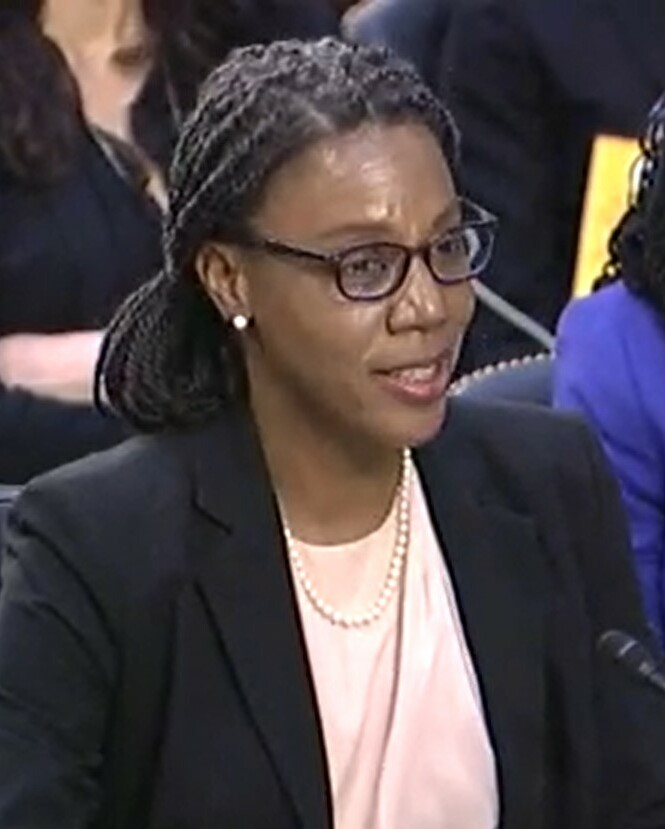
- Fairfax in 2022
- Born: 1970 (age 55–56)
- Spouse: Roger Fairfax
- Children: 3

Academic background
- Education: Harvard University (BA, JD)

Academic work
- Discipline: Law
- Sub-discipline: Business law
- Institutions: George Washington University; University of Pennsylvania

Lisa M. Fairfax (born 1970) is an American legal scholar who is a Presidential Professor at the University of Pennsylvania Law School. She was previously Alexander Hamilton Professor of Business Law at the George Washington University Law School.

== Early life and education ==
Fairfax was raised by a single parent in Compton, California. She attended Harvard University and Harvard Law School, where she met and became friends with Ketanji Brown Jackson.

== Career ==
Fairfax began her teaching career at the University of Maryland School of Law, then joined the faculty of the George Washington University Law School in 2009, where she was Alexander Hamilton Professor of Business Law. Fairfax is affiliated with the Democratic Party. In October 2015, President Barack Obama nominated Fairfax to serve as a member of the U.S. Securities and Exchange Commission, though she was never confirmed. In 2020, Fairfax was elected a member of the American Law Institute. In 2021, Fairfax joined the University of Pennsylvania Law School and was named to a Presidential Professorship. After Ketanji Brown Jackson was nominated to serve on the Supreme Court in 2022, Fairfax made an introductory statement at Jackson's Senate confirmation hearing.

== Personal life ==
Fairfax is married to Roger Fairfax, a lawyer and dean of the Howard University School of Law. She has three children.
