= Lillian Skinker Malone =

American educator

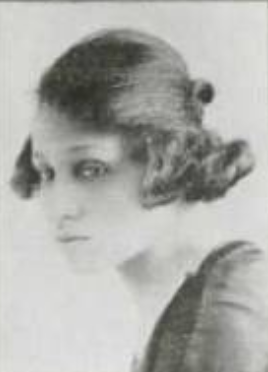
- Lillian R. Skinker (later Malone), from the 1922 Howard University yearbook for professional schools
- Born: April 24, 1891; Caroline County, Virginia
- Died: July 22, 1992 (age 101); Washington, D.C.
- Relatives: Wesley A. Brown (son-in-law)

Lillian R. Skinker Malone (April 24, 1891 – July 22, 1992) was an American educator based in Washington, D.C.

== Early life and education ==
Lillian Rose Skinker was born in Caroline County, Virginia, and raised in Washington, D.C., the daughter of Beckley Merriman Skinker and Rose (or Rosa) Allen Skinker. Her father was white, and her mother was Black. She had two brothers, Edward and Stanley, and three sisters, Ethel, Stella, and Laura.

She attended M Street High School and trained as a teacher at Miner Normal School. In 1919 she completed a bachelor's degree in education at Howard University; she earned a law degree at Howard's law school in 1922. She earned a master's degree from Howard in 1934, with a thesis titled "A study of the rate of adjustment in migrant students to the elementary schools of the District of Columbia at the several grade levels as measured by scores made on standardized reading tests" (1934).

== Sorority activities ==
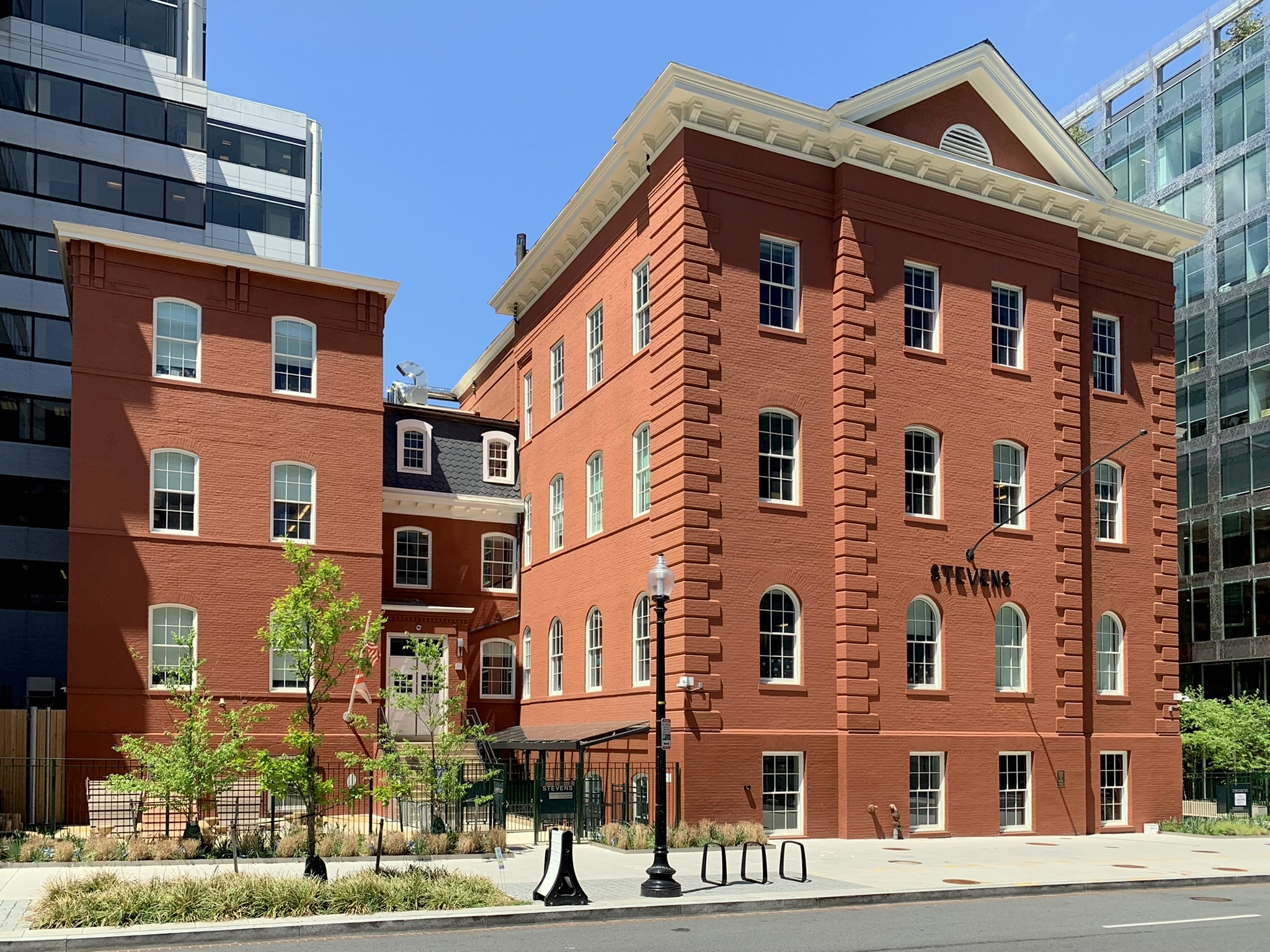
Thaddeus Stevens School Washington, D.C., where Malone was principal from 1935 to 1953

She was a member of the Alpha chapter of Delta Sigma Theta, and in 1918 helped establish the Gamma chapter at the University of Pennsylvania, with Sadie Tanner Mossell, Virginia Alexander, and Pauline Young among its first members. She also helped to organize Epsilon Sigma Iota, a sorority for Black women in the legal profession. In 1946, her daughter was accepted as a pledge in the Alpha Xi Delta sorority at the University of Vermont; because she was Black, the sorority chapter was put in probation, with the explanation that "we have so many Southern chapters, you know."

== Career ==
As a young woman, Skinker was known in Washington as an athlete in multiple sports; she swam competitively, played on a YWCA basketball team, and was the Black women's tennis champion in the city. She was a teacher and a principal at several schools in the city, including Reno, Smothers Elementary, and Stevens. In 1927, she and two other teachers resigned when they were charged with violating the district's maternity leave rule. She was principal of Stevens Elementary School from 1935 to 1953.

Malone organized an early program for physically disabled students, which developed into the Sharpe Health School. In 1950 her students attended a performance of the National Symphony Orchestra, along with students from white schools; "Mrs. Malone was bound and determined that Stevens children did not discredit their school or themselves," one of the students, Colbert I. King, recalled later.

Malone retired from schoolwork in 1953. In 1988 she attended the 120th anniversary of Stevens Elementary School, and received a framed picture of the school. She lived with her son in California during the 1950s and 1960s.

== Personal life ==
Skinker married Stanley Rollins Malone. They had two children, Stanley Jr. and Crystal. Her husband died in 1942, and she died in 1992, at the age of 101, in Georgetown. Her daughter was a prominent educator in Washington, and her son was a prominent lawyer and judge in Los Angeles. Her son-in-law, Wesley A. Brown, was the first Black graduate of the United States Naval Academy.
