= USS Kitty Hawk riot =

1972 racial conflict

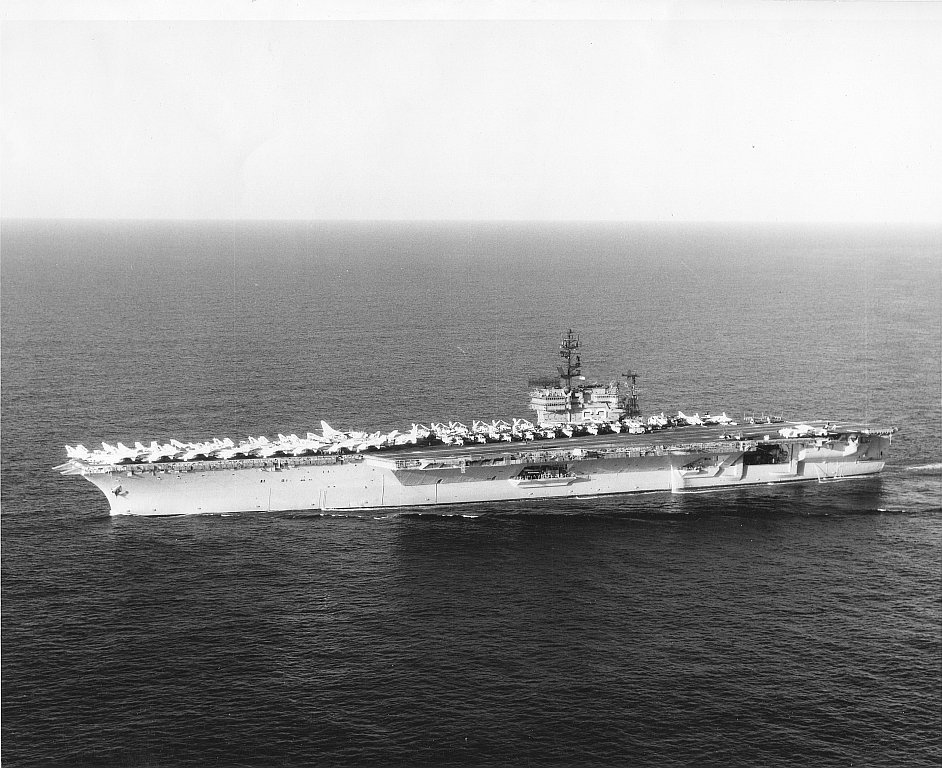
- USS Kitty Hawk c. 1975
- Date: 12/13 October 1972
- Location: off North Vietnam
- Participants: Kitty Hawk crew
- Outcome: Well over 50 crew members injured (3 seriously)

The USS Kitty Hawk riot was a racial conflict between white and Black crewmen aboard the United States Navy aircraft carrier Kitty Hawk on the night of 12–13 October 1972, while positioned in the Gulf of Tonkin off the coast of North Vietnam during the Vietnam War. (Note: Note on sources: Gregory Freeman noted on Page xvi of his book on the Kitty Hawk conflict, Troubled Waters, that the Navy had told him most of the original documents related to the investigations of the incidents had been destroyed. However, Marv Truhe, who in 1972, as a lieutenant and attorney in the Judge Advocate General’s Corps, was assigned to defend six of the accused Black sailors, had access to, and preserved, a large quantity of the original official documents. Therefore, Truhe's 2022 book, written subsequent to most other sources on this subject, and described by the San Diego Union (Nov. 21, 2022) as offering "the most complete picture yet of what happened on board the aircraft carrier and in the trials that followed", is used as a major source for this article.) In a retrospective article many years later, the Navy Times, called it "the worst shipboard riot in U.S. Navy history." When arrests were made, all 25 of those arrested were Black. A Black Navy official observed, "Anytime you have a so-called race riot and you lock up 25 blacks, that has to raise some questions." It also raised questions about more widespread problems as it took place during the same time period as two other serious racial incidents on board the aircraft carrier USS Constellation and fleet oiler USS Hassayampa. And it led to a congressional investigation before the House Armed Services Committee, Special Subcommittee on Disciplinary Problems in the U.S. Navy, in late November and early December 1972.

Well before these events, Admiral Elmo R. Zumwalt Jr., the Chief of Naval Operations, recognized "significant discrimination in the Navy." And, in their wake, he told the Congressional committee that these incidents '"are clearly due to failure of commands to implement' new racial programs 'with a whole heart.'" Addressing both the committee and the "Navy's entire command structure," he emphasized, "this issue of discrimination must be faced openly and fully." When Kitty Hawk returned to its home port in San Diego on November 28, 1972, a New York Times reporter asked debarking sailors what the trouble was aboard the ship, they yelled back a one word response: "racism".

== Background ==
=== Racial conflicts increase in US military ===
By the early 1970s, racial conflicts were causing serious problems in the US Armed Forces. Colonel Robert D. Heinl, Jr. stated in a 1971 study in the Armed Forces Journal called “The Collapse of the Armed Forces”, that “Internally speaking, racial conflicts and drugs…are tearing the services apart today.” Historians of the Vietnam War have documented that non-white GIs were often given the dirtiest jobs and frequently sent to the front lines in combat situations. A task force reporting to the Secretary of Defense at the time, Melvin R. Laird, found that racial discrimination in the military was not confined to the military but was “also a problem of a racist society”. Historian Gerald Gill contended that by 1970 most Black soldiers thought the war was a mistake, “hypocritical in intent and racist and imperialist by design.” One soldier was quoted as saying that Black soldiers were sent on risky assignments by white officers "so that 'there would be one less nigger to worry about back home.'"

=== Racial problems in the US Navy ===
In 1972 the problems that Heinl and others were describing were about to explode in the Navy. As the ground war stalemated and Army grunts increasingly refused to fight or resisted the war in various other ways, the U.S. "turned increasingly to air bombardment", much of it launched from US Navy aircraft carriers. By 1972 there were more than twice as many aircraft carriers in the Gulf of Tonkin as previously, plus they were spending "a record number of days at sea with a grueling pace of flight operations". The Navy, if anything, was a less welcoming environment for Black sailors than the Army. As an article in The New York Times put it, “The Navy, with its tradition of Filipino waiters and Southern WASP leadership, never really was an alternative for America's young city blacks". Even though the Navy was under pressure to increase Black recruitment to meet the needs of the expanding air war, they were still a small minority on board the Kitty Hawk in late 1972. "Of a crew numbering 348 officers and 4,135 enlisted men, just five, or less than 1 percent were officers, and only 297 enlisted men were black—just 7 percent of the enlisted crew." More, they "were typically assigned to the ship's most miserable jobs", often "the dreariest, most menial, and most unpopular jobs on board." What happened on the Kitty Hawk in October 1972, dramatically exposed the intersection of discontent over working and safety conditions, and racism.

=== Racial incidents on the Kitty Hawk ===
In June 1972, Captain Marland Townsend became the new commanding officer of the Kitty Hawk. In his first few weeks on board, he presided over four "interracial disciplinary matters" that would play a significant role "in the shipboard upheaval that followed." In the first, two Black crewmen accused of assaulting a white sailor were brought before Townsend in a captain's mast. One was sentenced to three days in the brig on bread and water, while the other was sentenced to 30 days in the brig. The ship's mast proceedings were all taped and broadcast later for the crew, so everyone watching onboard saw the outcome and heard Townsend make "a statement to the effect that anyone who fights or commits assault on his ship can be expected to be dealt with very harshly and severely." Just three days later a white sailor was brought before Townsend accused of calling a new Black recruit a racial epithet and hitting him in the back with his fist. According to Congressional testimony from the ship's executive officer (XO), Commander Benjamin Cloud, who was of Black and Native American descent, the Black crewmembers felt this "would be a very interesting and good case" to test the Captain's words, because in "both cases, there was obviously an assault involved." And yet, they watched him dismiss all the charges against the white sailor. The Captain explained his reasoning in his Congressional testimony: "I excused the man with a warning.... What he did was a situation that occurred in anger...frustration more than anger. It was not deliberate, not a planned assault."

In a third incident a few weeks later, a white sailor faced captain's mast for throwing a can of scouring powder at, and then punching a Black sailor. Again Townsend ignored his promise of severe treatment by assigning the white sailor a small fine. The day after the crew learned of this minor punishment, a fourth incident occurred when two Black sailors retaliated against and punched the white sailor who had received the small fine, and also punched another white sailor in the compartment. The Black sailors said they were repaying the white sailor for the previous assault. During the confrontation, one of the Black sailors threw a shoe that hit two nearby white sailors. His case was first referred to a captain's mast, and then escalated by Townsend to a special court-martial, an unprecedented move for "the alleged offense of throwing a shoe." The Black sailor was worried about the outcome, which could have included confinement for up to one year, and opted to accept an undesirable discharge instead, which stripped him of all post-military GI benefits. "This outcome was unheard of given the nature of the charged offense." More, these four incidents and their disparate punishments flatly contradicted Townsend's promise to deal with all assaults "harshly and severely."

His record was there for all to see. When Black sailors assaulted white sailors, the sentences ranged from three days' confinement on bread and water, to thirty days confinement, to a court-martial referral followed by an undesirable discharge. Yet when white sailors assaulted Black sailors? An outright dismissal of the charges in one case, and a twenty-five dollar fine in the other."

=== Racial incidents in Subic Bay ===
During two layovers in mid-September and early October 1972 at the Subic Bay Naval Base, in Olongapo, Philippines, two more racial incidents occurred. There were two main liberty areas in Olongapo, whose names reflected common racial relations at the time within the US Navy and US society as a whole—there was a mainly white section known as the "Strip", and a separate area frequented by Black GIs known as the "Jungle".

On September 13, several Black sailors reported being assaulted by Filipino locals at the instigation of a white sailor. The allegations against the white sailor were lodged by 5 Black sailors from the Kitty Hawk. The white sailor went before Townsend at a captain's mast, but received no punishment. When Townsend was questioned about this by the Congressional committee, he responded that the incident was "circulated by blacks" and that "[o]nly a few blacks made the charge".

Around midnight on October 9, a Black airman was returning to the Kitty Hawk when he claimed he was called a racial slur and thrown to the ground by two white sailors who continued to assault him. The two white sailors denied the assault, but two other white sailors from another ship gave statements to the Naval base security confirming the Black airman's story. They also noted that the Black sailor could not fight back because his arm was in a cast. The lead base investigator declined to take any action on the incident saying, "I didn't pursue the matter any further." When the Black sailor returned to the ship, he told other Black sailors about what happened, making them all "really unhappy". Captain Townsend conducted his own investigation into the incident, concluding that it was "black word against white word", despite the two white sailors from another ship who had corroborated the Black sailor's story. He also declined to take any action.

== The riot ==
On October 12, Kitty Hawk began participating in Operation Linebacker off the coast of North Vietnam. The ship "had been at sea nearly nine months under some of the most demanding conditions that a carrier crew had faced since World War II." The renewal of combat operations intensified the pressure and work pace on board, "racial tensions were approaching a fast boil", and more racial incidents began to occur. One of them started when several Black crewmen were greeting each other on the mess deck by giving dap and were told by a nearby crewman to cut it out. The Black crewmen continued and the situation escalated with more crewmembers gathering around and arguing. When a division officer entered the dining area he saw about 80 to 100 men, including about 25 Black men, "'having words' in a 'cross manner', but no fighting." Some Black petty officers arrived, and with some members of the human resources staff, were able to get the Black crewmen to go to the ship's human resources office where they were able to air "their grievances". They repeated their complaints about the incidents in the Philippines described above, complained about being discriminated against in ship assignments and promotions, and raised that they were increasingly being harassed for gathering in groups of three or more. As one Black sailor put it, "Twenty white sailors could sit at a table but four blacks could not." And, they wanted to know why it was only Black crewmen who were questioned after any interracial disturbance. These issues would loom large over the next 24 hours.

=== The aft mess deck and a pistol drawn ===
The next major incident occurred on the aft mess deck when several Black and white sailors began arguing and shouting angry words at each other. A mess cook decided he needed to call in the Marines and rushed to their compartment saying they were needed to "quell some disturbance". Around 20 Marines grabbed their nightsticks and went to the mess deck where they witnessed "sailors trading insults, but no fighting." Nevertheless, moving "right past the white sailors" they began implementing their riot control training on the Black sailors. With raised nightsticks, they "formed a blocking unit and began forcing the Black sailors backward." Soon more Marines arrived along with the Marine's commanding officer, Captain Nicholas Carlucci, who reported seeing a "standoff" between the two groups. Carlucci soon ordered his men to stand down but not before one of the Marines began to draw his .45 service pistol. The Marine was quickly pushed against a bulkhead by a nearby petty officer and told to keep his weapon holstered. However, several Black sailors had witnessed the pistol being drawn and at least one of them, who thought he was about to be shot, started screaming "you are not coming to shoot me." Several histories of these events have misreported this incident, stating, for example, that the Marine "instinctively reached for the loaded pistol at his side and placed his hand over it to make sure no one could take it from him." But the Marine himself wrote in his sworn statement the next morning that he "attempted to draw my pistol, [but a petty officer] stopped me and pinned me against the bulkhead and told me not to pull any pistol." He confirmed this in his testimony before a congressional committee where he was asked whether he grabbed for his gun to prevent it from "falling into unauthorized hands or for the purpose of using it?" He responded, "Both Sir." Carlucci, his commanding officer, also confirmed this in his congressional testimony, stating "He did attempt to draw it." This incident "spread like wildfire throughout the ship".

In his congressional testimony, Carlucci "reluctantly admitted" that this first involvement of his Marines, initiated by a mess cook, was a mistake. He was asked whether it was "customary for your Marines to respond to an order" from a mess cook. He responded "No, sir". Captain Townsend voiced a similar opinion in his own congressional testimony: "They were called out by a mess cook, is what it amounted to. They should not have responded under those circumstances."

=== The flight and hangar decks ===
After the incident on the mess deck, Captain Townsend ordered Carlucci to post increased security on the flight and hangar decks. Carlucci organized his Marines into "three-man patrols...with night sticks and whistles." He also ordered a "12-man reaction force" to standby "just below the hangar deck." He told them to protect aircraft and other equipment and "to break up groups of more than three." This last order was very unusual as men on board the ship would often gather in larger groups while working, eating and relaxing.

==== Only Black sailors ====
More, the order ended up being interpreted and carried out by the Marines as an order to separate only groups of Black sailors. Commander Cloud, confirmed this in his testimony at a court-martial proceeding:

...it became apparent that the Marines, instead of executing it bilaterally...allowed assembled groups of whites to mill around the hanger deck, but in the course of the evening, as groups of blacks started coming to the hanger deck, three or more, they were approached by the Marines and told to disperse or disband. And this, of course, started the altercation [emphasis added]. From the course of my investigation, it became apparent that the blacks asked why; words were exchanged; more blacks came to the scene; more Marines came to the scene on being summoned by the Marines; and from here physical altercation took place."

When one of the Marines was asked whether he had been ordered to also break up groups of white sailors, he said, "I don't recall that it was ever brought up, sir."

==== More than two ====
Further compounding the situation, the Marines recalled hearing Carlucci say they should break up groups of "more than two." The Marines were then charged with carrying out this extremely unusual order with no other crew members even aware that such an order had been issued. In one of the first subsequent encounters, three Black airmen were crossing the hanger bay together when three Marines rushed up to them shouting they were "not to walk in a group." An argument ensued and the Marines started handcuffing and clubbing the airmen. Nearby about a dozen Black sailors were confronted by Marines telling them they could only walk in "pairs of twos." The sailors couldn't figure out what was happening and walked away, some with their fists raised. A marine sergeant blew his whistle and more Marines converged on the sailors beating them with clubs and choking them. No evidence exists that any of the "Black sailors were doing anything but simply walking through the hanger bay".

Marine First Sergeant Willie A. Binkley was the senior Marine enlisted man on board at the time, and was supervising the Marines on the hanger bay. When a group of "35 or 40" Black sailors entered the hanger bay, coming from a meeting with the Captain and Executive Officer. Binkley ordered them to disperse, but only in groups of two or three. Telling a group of close to 40 people to leave the area, but only in groups of "two or three" resulted in very predictable chaos, confusion and anger. One of the Black sailors described what happened to him and two friends:

As we were walking across the hanger deck, a couple of Marines came up and one said, 'You blacks, quote, you blacks, can't walk in over twos.' We’re thinking, yeah right, and we kept on walking. The Marine made the comment again. Puleeze, I’m going to have a Marine tell me I can’t walk with two of my friends. The next thing I know my body is up against an A‑6 aircraft with a nightstick under my neck.

==== Arrested for talking back ====
In his congressional testimony, Binkley described issuing commands beyond his orders. He said he got "a little more lip service" from one of the Black sailors, and then ordered him arrested for talking back. So, not only did the Marines arrest the Black sailors for being in groups of more than two—if they objected verbally, they were also arrested. Binkley described what happened next:

Then that more or less really antagonized them because we were in fact apprehending them and taking them away. They started, all of them started, I don't know how the hell they got the word all the way around that fast, but a lot more come up from the after mess deck.... that gave us 26 Marines in the hangar bay against say 80 of these guys. We were apprehending them, and at the same time moving them aft in the hangar bay, trying to wedge them in against elevator 33, which was up. They had a choice to do what they were told or sit down or jump over the side.

Binkley had told a congressional committee that he offered the Black crewmen the option of surrendering or jumping off the carrier's flight deck to their deaths, and this for the offense of walking "through the hanger bay in groups of three or more" or talking back. Some of the Black sailors involved informed The Los Angeles Times "that fighting broke out only when blacks began defending themselves against attacks by marines and white sailors."

The Marines continued to use their nightsticks and forced the Black sailors to the deck as they handcuffed them. One Airman was handcuffed so tightly that he was in terrible pain. In fact, the cuffs were on so tight that the Marines who placed him in the ship's brig were unable to remove them. The XO recalled the airman being brought to him with cuffs "cutting into his wrists", so much so that he "was hysterical". The cuffs were finally removed after more than an hour.

While these confrontations and arrests were occurring a large group of white sailors gathered on the mezzanine deck overlooking the hanger bay. Some of the white sailors, led by a white "first class petty officer", began "egging the marines on" and "yelling and screaming obscenities at the Black sailors down below," including "liberal use of nigger and motherfucker". Captain Townsend, who was now on the hanger bay, warned the white petty officer verbally and then ordered him arrested when he persisted. "No attempt was made to break up the group of white sailors as they hurled epithets down at the Black sailors."

Townsend also stopped the arrest of the Black sailors, telling them they could "go about your business, we have solved the problems for the night." And he ordered the Marines to "return to their quarters."

=== Sick bay ===
Several crew members were taken to the ship's sick bay following the hanger bay incidents: one Marine, with a bloody nose, and four Black crewmen with serious injuries caused by the Marines. Soon two more Black sailors arrived carrying a "severely injured" Black crew member. Several more Marines also arrived and were told by a medical corpsmen to secure the entrances to sick bay. The Marines were soon joined by more Marines who sealed off all the entrances. "No record shows that anyone ordered them there," and their presence "was in direct violation of Captain Townsend's stand-down order." As more injured Black sailors arrived from the hanger bay, the Marines actively resisted their efforts to get medical treatment, "and further confrontations occurred." As the night wore on some injured Black crewmen were prevented from seeking treatment in sick bay and others were afraid to travel there for fear of "white sailors who were on the prowl." Further, many Black crewmen who were treated were not written up in the ship's official medical reports. This muddied the record when injuries were tallied later. There were 51 medical reports produced after the night's events, but only nine of those were for Black crewmen, many less than were actually injured. For example, as many as six corpsmen were working in sick bay that night and one of them testified to treating "ten, eleven, a little bit more," Black crewmembers. No record exists of how many Black crewmen were treated by the other corpsmen, and no "explanation was ever given as to why medical reports were not issued" for them.

This discrepancy was compounded by the fact that very few of those Black crewmembers who were injured were interviewed during the follow-up investigations. The nine Black sailors who did have medical reports written about their injuries all "reported they were victims of unprovoked assaults by Marines or other white crew members." Their injuries "included two with head lacerations, one with a possible fractured hand, and one with three broken ribs", but only three of them were ever interviewed in the investigations and no one was ever questioned or court-martialed for assaulting them. Even more revealing, six of those nine victims "were themselves later charged with rioting and assaults." More on this below.

Overall, the ship's chief medical director's report of injuries included "two somewhat major" procedures, but mostly "abrasions, contusions, black eyes...a fair number of lacerations, mostly superficial, just of the skin, and superficial subcutaneous tissues. Very little in terms of anything that would have a lasting disability. Mostly bumps, bruises and minor cuts."

=== Conflicting orders ===
Commander Cloud left the hanger bay after hearing a crewman say "they are killing people down in sick bay." He quickly went there but only saw a "general commotion" which "quieted down" as he arrived. He then heard someone say "They got the captain," and proceeded quickly back toward the hanger deck. On his way he was told by someone he thought was a chief petty officer, "They killed the captain." He became extremely worried that the captain had been injured or killed and decided he needed to issue a ship-wide order to separate the Black crewmen and the Marines. He rushed to Damage Control Central and broadcast a message to the entire ship declaring an emergency and ordering all Black crewmen to the aft mess deck and all Marines to the forward part of the ship. This order, which essentially countermanded the Captain's earlier order telling the Marines to stand down, created more turmoil as "Black sailors and marines were rushing forward and aft in opposite directions, and again running into each other." Captain Townsend, who of course had not been killed, arrived very soon, and very angry, in central control and broadcast a countermanding order to the ship. He commanded the entire crew to go about their "normal business" and settle down. He also ordered the Marines to not use any weapons and later told the congressional committee that he wanted them to be "right where I could control them.

=== Widespread fear and confusion ===
Captain Townsend had clearly recognized that the Black sailors were "very fearful of the marines". He described hearing from Black crewmen several times that "They are killing our brothers!" And this fear only escalated as the evening progressed. The XO heard Black crew members saying, "Marines are killing blacks and throwing them overboard" and felt this convinced them "they had to arm for their own protection." A Black petty officer testified that many crew members were scared, there were "a lot of scared people on that ship that night. From scuttlebutt such as 'They are going to kill all the blacks. They are killing all the whites.' Things like this were being said, 'The captain has been killed. The Executive Officer has been knocked down.' Things of this nature." Although, none of these rumors turned out to be true, "they had a significant impact on the actions of many sailors throughout the evening. Black and white." Despite Captain's Townsend's assurances to the Black crewmen that the problems were solved, racial incidents continued and the Marines were still confronting Black sailors. The XO told the congressional committee that by this time his credibility, "had been completely lost as a result of the beatings that took place on the hangar deck at a time when we had said the Marines would not harm them."

All of this was, of course, within the context of the racism the Black crewmen had been experiencing onboard for months. And now, they were seeing Black crewmen attacked and arrested for nothing more than being with their friends, while large groups of white crewmen were allowed to gather and throw insults at them, even with the ship's captain present.

=== Assaults by Black and white sailors ===
But things did not settle down. A "small group of Black sailors began roaming the carrier," expressing their fear and anger by randomly assaulting white crewmen. And "several white sailors began roaming the ship, carrying out assaults on Black sailors." Overall, 42 white crewmen were treated in sick bay. Numerous Black crewmen were assaulted by white sailors, but actual numbers are unclear due to the lack of medical reports (as mentioned above). Even Commander Cloud found himself threatened by white sailors. He described some white sailors saying, "Here comes the black motherfucker.... I thought we had thrown his ass over the side long ago. I guess we'll have to do it." He said he was commonly insulted by white sailors and one group said "We ought to kill him." He also reported going into a compartment and finding a group of "maybe 100 to 150 whites". He said they disrespected him and said he was "nothing more than a nigger, just like all the rest of them." When he was asked by the congressional committee to "identify for the record those whites who threatened you, and those who insulted you", he responded that he could not identify individuals, "[t]hey were people that were in and part of large groups, half a dozen or more, mobs." He also described colliding with a "group of whites" so forcefully that he fell to the floor and his "shirt was torn open". Instead of helping him up, the white sailors "stopped a brief few moments and used...verbal insults and threats". Other than from the XO, however, "Virtually no statements were ever taken from Black crew members," even though many of them were injured (see above)—the record is therefore very one-sided regarding assaults on Black crewmen.

In fact, the Navy's investigations into all the events described above focused almost entirely on the Black crewmen. This blind spot was perhaps most obvious in Captain Townsend who submitted a written statement to the congressional committee objecting to a December 1972 Time magazine article which reported "groups of both whites and blacks" rampaging through the ship. Townsend stated, "no whites were involved in any rampaging." There "was no mutual combat", he insisted, only groups of Black sailors assaulting "individual or smaller groups of white sailors." This falsehood played a significant role in the one sided investigation and the charges that followed, as well as much of the press coverage and historical accounts. For example, a 2017 Navy Times retrospective reported that "marauding bands of five to 25 [Black] sailors continued to move about the ship, attacking whites," with no mention of the groups of white crewmen doing the same. Rarely did reporting or histories mention Commander Cloud's "collision" with a group of whites that tore his shirt open and knocked him to the floor, or many of the other white attacks on Black crewmen. More, when Townsend was questioned by the news media about possible racial discrimination aboard his ship, he insisted there was no evidence of that and that "things are fine the way they are." He also told the congressional committee that there "were no black resentments...and there was no unusual tenseness about the ship."

During the subsequent courts-martials, however, quite a bit of evidence of white assaults on Black crewmen came to light. Perhaps some of the most revealing came from an surprising source. During the court-martial of one of the Black crewmen, a white airman named Michael Laurie lied during his testimony. The defense knew this and, because he was a key government witness in more than one of the pending trials, decided to send someone undercover to befriend and record him. Among other admissions he said on tape,

We all went out there and stomped some ass.... I had a lead pipe about six feet long.... We were out there fighting with wrenches and stuff and then we worked our way over to a fire hose, broke out the fucking fire hose.... we did it without gettin', without getting caught.... They haven't even asked us if we fought back or anything.

When he was asked whether the legal officer had interviewed him, he said,

Yeah, he interviewed us.... He didn't even ask us if we fought back cuz he knows fucking well we did... If it happens again and I'm around when it happens I'll kill me some fucking niggers.

=== Deescalation ===
After midnight, Townsend and Cloud began moving through the ship calming sailors and persuading them to relinquish any weapons. By 2 a.m., things had quieted down considerably with only a few minor incidents still occurring. About forty sailors, both Black and white, had gathered in the aft mess deck to eat, play cards and listen to music. Cloud even came there for awhile and had a sandwich. A short time later, Townsend told Cloud he was "concerned about the congregation of blacks that were on the mess deck". He likened the gathering to a "victory celebration." Townsend dispersed the group and met with any sailors who were still upset in the forecastle until around 6 a.m.

In the morning, Cloud was told about a large group of around 150 white sailors gathering in the berthing compartment becoming increasingly angry. They were readying themselves for what they thought would be an outright racial battle for control of Kitty Hawk. He went to talk to them and was dismissed as being "nothing more than a nigger, just like all the rest of them". When Cloud reminded them he was the executive officer of the ship and threatened them with legal action if they proceeded, they backed down. Cloud reported the incident to Townsend and then continued to talk to concerned sailors, both white and Black, throughout the morning, reducing the threat of additional confrontations.

By midmorning, the confrontations had completely ended, and the Kitty Hawk resumed normal operations.

== "Extraordinary security measures" ==
In the afternoon of October 13, Townsend put the ship into "extraordinary security measures". He instituted Condition II, which was one step down from General Quarters, or battle stations, and one step above the ship's normal wartime cruising watch. He also doubled the master-at-arms force, placed an officer or petty officer in every berthing compartment all night, and ordered Condition Zebra, which meant "every other passageway" on the second deck was closed off, creating "kind of like a zigzag or a puzzle trying to get through the ship." Townsend described it as putting everyone "under complete surveillance." The same day he also made dapping an chargeable offense on his ship. As he put it, "You have to break up the solidarity, that is all. One thing I will never permit on my ship again is the so-called 'dap'". He called it "the major coercive method that the blacks use." More, he began banning any group meetings and made his reasoning clear in his congressional testimony. He said, "a group of 15 blacks...a large group of that size is an abnormal group. You don't see 15 whites get together in a group that size, so you can't say why don't you break up a group of 15 whites, because people don't congregate in groups of that size." "[W]ho could misconstrue what he meant when he said 'people' don't congregate in large groups like Black men do?" Townsend was so worried about Black sailors meeting he "even ordered his XO not to meet with Black sailors the evening after the incident."

== Courts-martial ==
By late October 1972, Townsend had charged 25 Black sailors with assaults, and 21 of them with rioting. He referred all but one of these to special courts-martial. This was the first time the Navy had tried such a large number of defendants, the first time sailors had ever been charged with rioting, and the first time a large group "of defendants were locked up in the brig for months before their trials."

=== One white sailor ===
No white crew members were charged until months later, and then only one who was quickly acquitted. Also, none of the white crewmen questioned during the investigations were given Article 31 warnings. Article 31 warnings are the Uniform Code of Military Justice (UCMJ) equivalent of Miranda warnings for civilians, providing service members with protection against self-incrimination. This meant that from the beginning of the investigations, "not a single white sailor was ever considered a potential suspect." Several months after the shipboard incidents, one white sailor was charged with assault and referred to a special court-martial. He was only charged after defense counsel had raised the issue in court of the "selective prosecution" of only Black crewmen. The white sailor was prosecuted by a newly arrived, inexperienced JAG (military) attorney, and acquitted "after only 23 minutes of deliberation" by "three white officers".

=== Black defendants ===
The first three Black defendants were tried onboard Kitty Hawk in early November. Two were charged with rioting, but acquitted. All were charged with assault, with two found guilty and the third acquitted. The two convicted of assault were confined to the brig for two months.

In late November the remaining defendants arrived in San Diego and many were immediately placed in a maximum security brig where they remained for months. The accused were all assigned JAG attorneys, and a number of them requested civilian counsel. The publicity and the controversy surrounding the cases convinced both the NAACP and the ACLU to become involved and they helped defend a number of the accused.

=== Evidence withheld, prejudice and perjury ===
As the trials progressed, the defense learned that a large number of "eyewitness statements were withheld from the outset, and never provided" by the Navy. The NAACP charged that "the Navy had withheld an 'exculpatory' investigation report that would have resulted in acquittal of the blacks tried so far." The executive directory of the NAACP, Roy Wilkins, called the Navy's handling of the cases a "despicable perversion of justice." A defense attorney explained to the San Diego Union, "The Navy has withheld statements made by witnesses as well as photographs".

There was also the racism and perjury admitted to by Seaman Laurie, as described above, which led to one conviction being overturned and another being dropped entirely. Laurie also alleged racial prejudice on the part of the Kitty Hawk's legal officer. According to Laurie, he never asked the white sailors if they fought back "because he knows we did".

=== Mainly lesser convictions ===
In April 1973, the courts-martial concluded with a total of 27 trials. Only four sailors were convicted of rioting, with two of those pleading guilty in exchange for lenient sentences. Fourteen were convicted of assault, four were found not guilty of all charges, and five had the charges dropped entirely. The New York Times reported that the Navy was "having difficulty" proving that Black crewmen "incited a racial riot aboard the aircraft carrier Kitty Hawk". "Navy prosecutors", the article continued, "have had to be content with convictions on lesser charges of simple assault, breach of the peace and insubordination."

== Classification as a riot ==
From the beginning, debate ensued around the classification of the incident as a riot. A Black Navy official observed, "Anytime you have a so-called race riot and you lock up 25 blacks, that has to raise some questions." A Navy attorney "acknowledged that it had been difficult...to establish a pattern of concerted, deliberate action on the part of the black crew members that would meet the uniform military code's definition of a riot." The UCMJ defines a riot as, "a public disturbance by three or more people assembled with a common purpose to act against opposition, committing acts of violence in a turbulent manner to cause public terror, and disturbing the peace of the military community." In short, it requires a group effort designed to incite terror. As one of the military defense attorneys put it during an early pretrial hearing onboard Kitty Hawk, "no evidence has been submitted by the government of a furtherance of a common purpose.... What went on seemed so disorganized, so randomized around the different parts of the ship, it seemed to really be more of a reaction to confrontations". The testimony in most of the courts-martials "described individuals or small groups of blacks and whites clashing in scattered encounters, with highly contradictory identifications as to the aggressors."

If anything resembling a riot did take place, it involved the provocative actions of some of the white crewmembers on the ship's mezzanine described above. JAG attorney and military judge Marv Truhe argued in his book Against All Tides: The Untold Story of the USS Kitty Hawk Race Riot that those actions by the white petty officer and the sailors with him were, in fact, "a textbook violation of the UCMJ offense of inciting a riot." He quotes Commander Cloud's testimony that a group of white sailors on the mezzanine "were 'taunting' the Black sailors, 'hurling verbal abuses," and 'egging the marines' on in the altercation below."

== Rush to judgement ==
From the morning after the events of October 12-13, Captain Townsend and the Navy's official onboard JAG inquiry, led by Captain Frank Haak, sought to prove that what took place consisted essentially of unprovoked attacks by Black crewmen against innocent whites. This uncritical assumption continued through the subsequent November-December 1972 hearings of the House Armed Services Committee, and was often reflected in news reporting of the incident.

As discussed above, Townsend testified that "no whites were involved in any rampaging", that there "was no mutual combat", and that only groups of Black sailors assaulted "individual or smaller groups of white sailors."

The Haak inquiry, which came to conclusions similar to Townsend's, interviewed almost exclusively white crewmen. Commander Cloud testified "that the preponderance of the witnesses...before Captain Haak's investigation were all white, in excess of a hundred, with only maybe two or three, at the most, blacks being allowed or invited to testify." Defense attorneys confirmed this when they received copies of onboard interviews and found only two from Black sailors. Black sailors interviewed by the press complained that "even though they knew the identity of assailants" they were not allowed to file charges against white crewmen who assaulted them.

Similarly, the House investigation, led by Representative Floyd V. Hicks, concluded that the riot had "consisted of unprovoked assaults by a very few men...all of whom were black." It also argued that most of these men "were below‑average mental capacity". But, as pointed out by Representative Ronald F. Dellums and others, this investigation had also interviewed none of the Black crewmen involved. When Mr. Hicks was asked about this by the New York Times, he "acknowledged that his investigators had not talked to black defendants charged in the incidents because they had refused to be interviewed." He didn't mention the men's trials were pending and, therefore, had been advised not to talk to anyone but their lawyers. Dellums, by contrast, interviewed "lawyers, sailors and military defense counsel for the Kitty Hawk sailors, as well as...other San Diego naval base personnel", and charged that "the special committee did less than an adequate job". As for the allegation of low "mental capacity", it appears to be a complete fiction, with no testimony or evidence to substantiate it. In the only congressional testimony about this in relation to the Kitty Hawk's Black crew, a Boatswain's mate confirmed that the Black sailors working for him had above average military classification tests. Further, the defendants service record summaries compiled by the Haak investigation showed that most of the defendants were high school graduates with above average scores in their classification tests.

== See also ==
- 1941 Harvard–Navy lacrosse game—lacrosse game in which the Navy team would not play against an integrated team
- African American opposition to United States involvement in the Vietnam War
- Golden Thirteen—first African American commissioned and warranted officers in the U.S. Navy
- Military history of African Americans
- Port Chicago disaster—munitions explosion whose subsequent trial highlighted racial inequality in the Navy
- Racism against African Americans in the U.S. military
