= Archbishop Carroll High School (Washington, D.C.) =

Catholic high school in Washington, D.C.

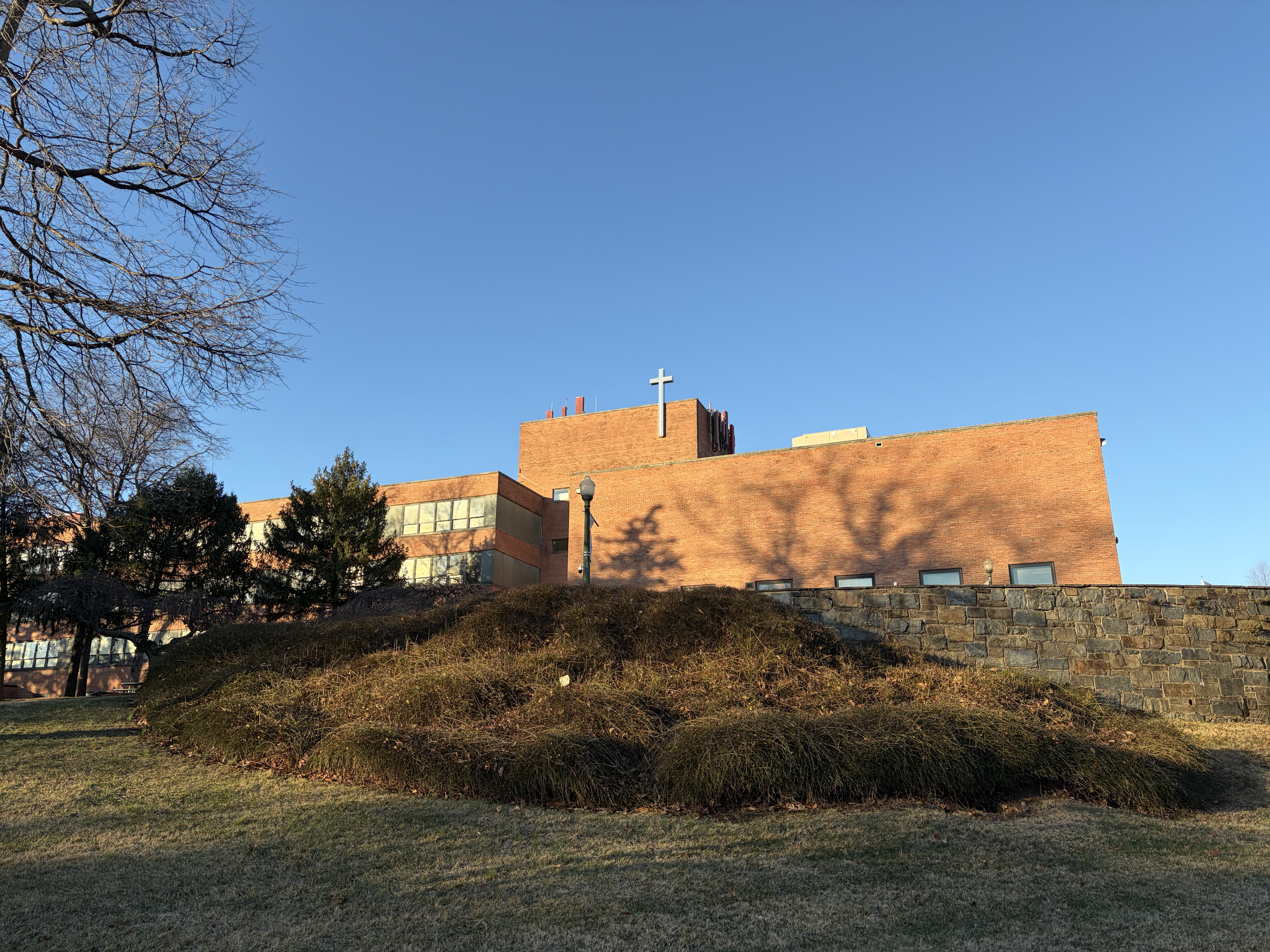

Location
- 4300 Harewood Road NE; Washington D.C. 20017; United States; 38°56′24″N 77°00′11″W

Information
- Former names: Mackin High School; All Saints High School; Holy Spirit High School
- School type: Private, Catholic, college preparatory
- Motto: Latin: Pro Deo et Patria (For God and Country)
- Denomination: Catholic Church
- Patron saint: Augustine of Hippo
- Established: 1951; 75 years ago
- Founder: Patrick O'Boyle (Archbishop of Washington)
- Educational authority: Archdiocese of Washington Catholic Schools
- CEEB code: 090010
- President: Larry Savoy
- Chair: Roger Fairfax
- Principal: Brandy Hawes
- Teaching staff: 40.5 (on an FTE basis)
- Grades: 9–12
- Gender: Co-educational
- Student to teacher ratio: 9.8:1
- Colors: Green and gold
- Athletics conference: Washington Catholic Athletic Conference
- Nickname: Lions
- Accreditation: MSA
- Publication: Green Notes
- Endowment: $525,000 (2010)
- School fees: $650
- Annual tuition: $16,791
- Revenue: $8.5 million (2010)
- Affiliation: Catholic University of America
- Website: www.archbishopcarroll.org

Archbishop Carroll High School is a four-year private, catholic, college-preparatory high school with an emphasis on social justice and civic engagement, located in the Brookland neighborhood of Northeast Washington, D.C. It is owned and operated by the Archdiocese of Washington, is part of the Washington Catholic Athletic Conference, and is affiliated with the Catholic University of America.

== History ==
Archbishop Carroll High School opened in 1951 and expressed the vision of Patrick A. O'Boyle, the first archbishop of the Archdiocese of Washington, who felt strongly that the Catholic Church should lead by example in the area of integration. Named in honor of John Carroll, the first Catholic archbishop in the United States, the school offered a college preparatory education for young men, regardless of race or ethnicity. For its first 40 years, the Augustinian Friars operated Archbishop Carroll.

In 1989, the Archdiocese of Washington closed three of its four high schools—the all boys' Mackin, and girls' schools All Saints and Holy Spirit—leaving one, Archbishop Carroll.

From 2009-2019, Archbishop Carroll High School participated as an International Baccalaureate World School and offered the IB Diploma Programme.

As of the 2019-2020 School Year, Archbishop Carroll High School has transitioned to pre-Advanced Placement (PreAP) and Advanced Placement (AP) coursework.

== Notable alumni ==
- Jeremiah Attaochu (2010), defensive end for the Denver Broncos
- Ruben Boumtje-Boumtje (1997), former Georgetown University and NBA basketball player and executive
- Michael A. Brown (Mackin, 1983), politician (at-large council member on the D.C. City Council) and convicted felon.
- Austin Carr (Mackin, 1967), former Notre Dame and NBA player
- Johnny Dawkins (Mackin, 1982), former Duke University and NBA player and current head coach at the University of Central Florida
- Roger Fairfax (1990), legal scholar, Dean of the American University Washington College of Law, and Chair of the Board of Directors of Archbishop Carroll High School in Washington, D.C.
- Marvin Graves (1989), former Syracuse University and CFL football player
- Bernard Griffith (Mackin), Dallas Mavericks assistant coach, head basketball coach at Dillard University, and national champion high school head coach
- Anton Harrison (2020), Offensive Tackle for the Jacksonville Jaguars
- Rich Harrison (1993), music producer
- Tom Hoover (1959), Villanova University and pro basketball player, first-round pick in 1963 NBA draft
- Joe Johnson (1981), played football for Washington Redskins, Minnesota Vikings (known as Joe Howard while in school)
- Eddie Jordan (1973), former National Basketball Association player, head coach
- Kris Joseph (2008), Boston Celtics basketball player
- Jevon Langford (1992), defensive end for Cincinnati Bengals
- Derrick Lewis (1984), professional basketball player
- Mike Lonergan (1984), Former basketball head coach Catholic University of America, University of Vermont, and George Washington University
- Edward Malloy (1959), 16th president of University of Notre Dame
- Rodney McGruder (2005-2008) professional basketball player for the Detroit Pistons. He played college basketball for Kansas State Wildcats.
- Lawrence Moten (1991), played basketball for Syracuse University
- Martin Puryear (1959), artist known for devotion to traditional craft
- Boyd Rutherford (1974), Republican Lieutenant Governor of Maryland
- Michael S. Steele (1977), former chairman of Republican National Committee, former Lieutenant Governor of Maryland
- John Thompson, Jr. (1960), Boston Celtics, Georgetown University basketball coach
- Troy Weaver (1991), NBA executive
- Robert White (2000), Democratic at-large seat on the Council of the District of Columbia
- Jamal Williams (1994), former defensive tackle for the San Diego Chargers and Denver Broncos
