= Wesley A. Brown =

American naval officer (1927–2012)

Wesley Brown
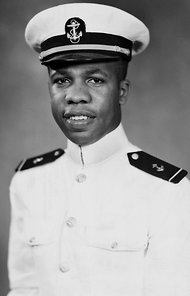
- Wesley Brown
- Born: April 3, 1927; Baltimore, Maryland
- Died: May 22, 2012 (aged 85); Silver Spring, Maryland
- Occupations: U.S. Navy Officer, civil engineer
- Known for: First African American to graduate from the United States Naval Academy

Wesley Anthony Brown (April 3, 1927 – May 22, 2012) was the first African-American graduate of the United States Naval Academy (USNA) in Annapolis, Maryland. He served in the United States Navy from May 2, 1949, until June 30, 1969. He was involved in both the Korean and Vietnam wars.

== Early life ==
Wesley Brown was born on April 3, 1927, in Baltimore, Maryland. He was graduated from Dunbar High School in Washington, DC, where he was Cadet Corps Battalion Commander during his senior year. He became the first in his family to attend college, at Howard University, a historically black college.

== Naval career ==
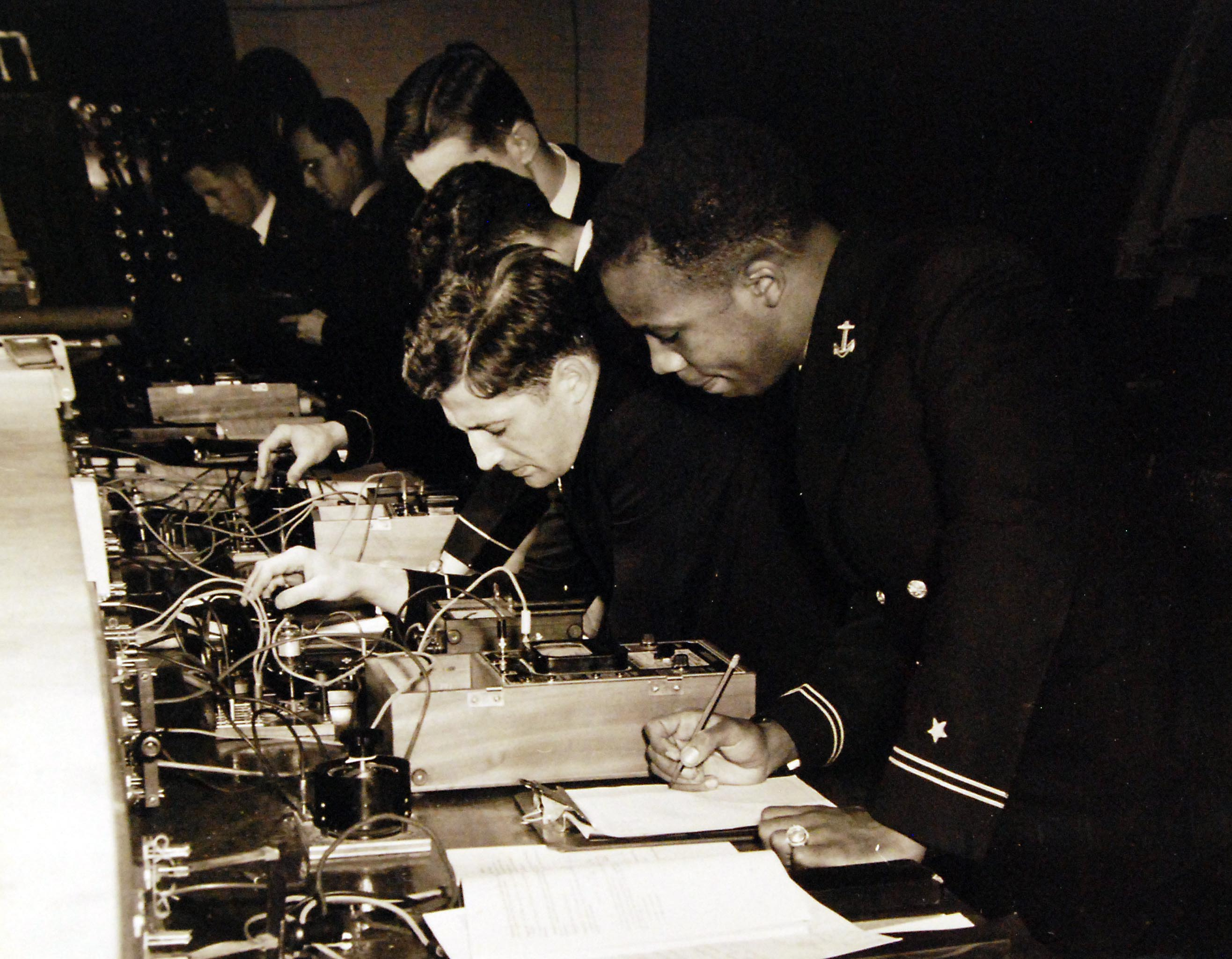
Midshipman Brown, laboratory exercise in electrical engineering, 1949.

Brown was nominated for admission and later appointed to the Naval Academy by New York Congressman Adam Clayton Powell Jr. Brown entered the Academy on June 30, 1945, as the sixth African American to be admitted. On June 3, 1949, he was the first to graduate from the institution. He was an accomplished athlete, running cross-country with fellow Academy Schoolmate- Jimmy Carter, who became the 39th president. The experiences of the first five African Americans admitted to the academy and the challenges Brown and the others faced are documented in the book Breaking the Color Barrier: The US Naval Academy's First Black Midshipmen and the Struggle for Racial Equality, written by Navy historian Robert J. Schneller Jr.

== Post-naval career ==
Brown retired as a lieutenant commander in June 1969 after serving 20 years in the Navy's Civil Engineer Corps. There Brown was responsible for building military service member homes in Hawaii, roads in Liberia, wharves in the Philippines, a nuclear power plant in Antarctica, and a desalination plant in Guantanamo Bay, Cuba. When he retired, Brown consulted on construction projects and joined the faculty at Howard University as a physical facilities analyst. He served as chairman of the Service Academy Selection Board of DC's Congressional Representative Eleanor Holmes Norton. He retired from the University .

== Personal life ==
Brown and his wife Crystal had four children and seven grandchildren. Their daughter Carol Jackson chairs the California Division of the American Cancer Society and heads the External Affairs and Diversity Management departments at Macy's West.

Brown was a volunteer motivational speaker; he spoke with Washington, DC high school students and midshipmen of the USNA Black Studies Club during Black History Month.

Brown's wife, Crystal Malone Brown, was the daughter of educator Lillian Skinker Malone. Crystal Malone made national headlines as a college student in Vermont in 1946, when the Alpha Xi Delta chapter was put on probation for accepting her, a Black pledge. The Vermont chapter refused to comply with national demands, and instead dissolved.

== Death ==
Brown died aged 85 on May 22, 2012, in Silver Spring, Maryland.

== Awards and honors ==
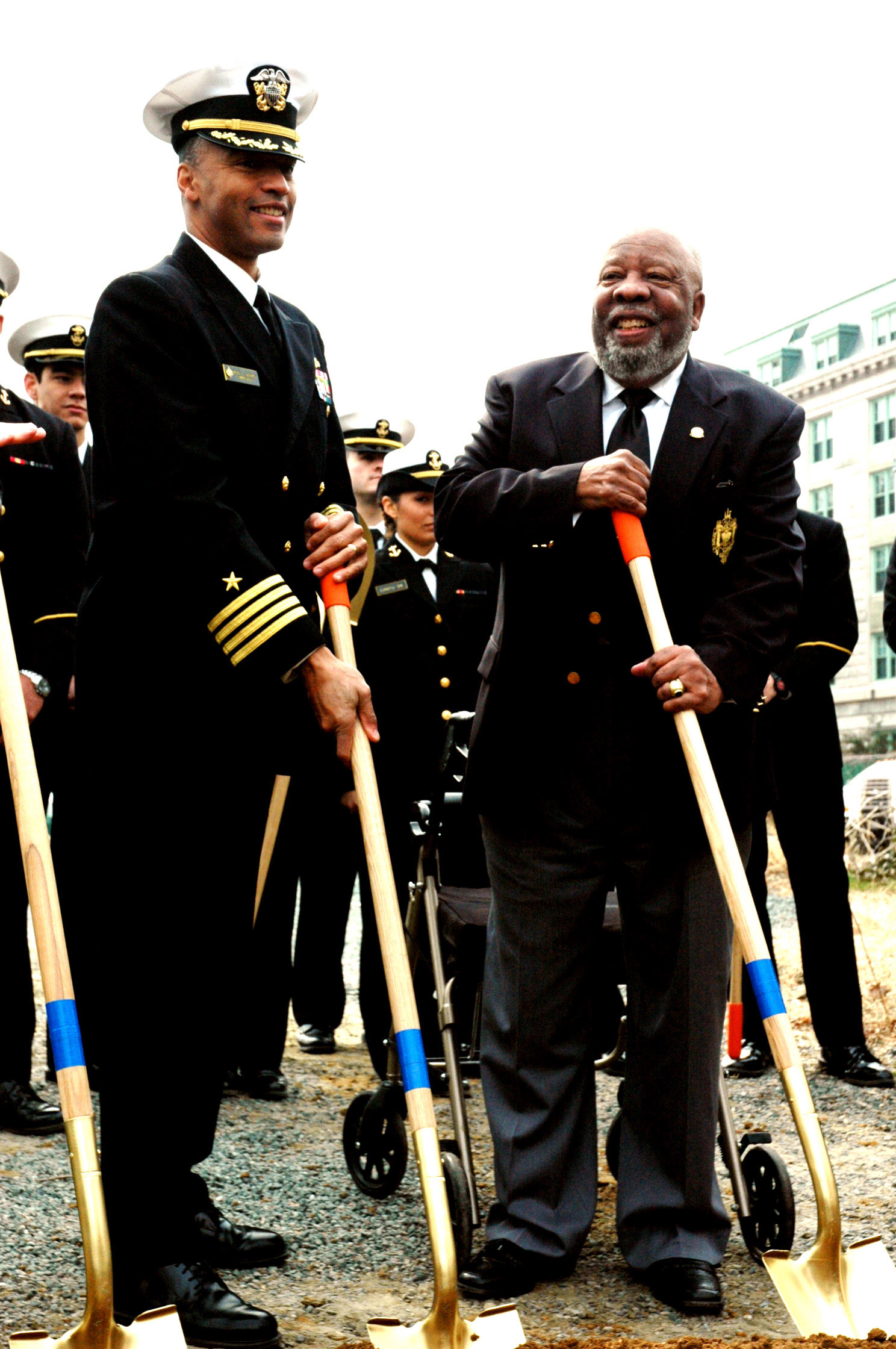
Then Captain, now Admiral, Bruce E. Grooms (left) and Wesley Brown (right) at the groundbreaking ceremony for the Wesley Brown Field House, March 25, 2006

Brown served in the Republic of the Philippines, Korea, Vietnam and Guantanamo Bay, Cuba.

Brown received the American Theater Ribbon and World War II Victory Medal. he was recognized with the 2009 National Society of Black Engineers Golden Torch Legacy Award-First Honoree.

The Wesley Brown Field House at the U.S. Naval Academy is named in his honor. Brown wielded a shovel in the groundbreaking on March 25, 2006. The building was completed in March 2008 and dedicated on May 10, 2008. Brown also participated in the ribbon-cutting ceremony with Chairman of the Joint Chiefs of Staff Adm. Mike Mullen, Naval Academy Superintendent Vice Adm. Jeffrey L. Fowler, and Maryland Governor Martin O'Malley.

Brown was a member of Alpha Phi Alpha fraternity.

== See also ==
- 1941 Harvard–Navy lacrosse game
- Lawrence Chambers, the second African American to graduate from the U.S. Naval Academy
- James H. Conyers, the first African American to attend the U.S. Naval Academy
- Janie L. Mines, the first African-American woman to graduate from the U.S. Naval Academy
- Charles V. Bush, the first African American to attend the U.S. Air Force Academy
- List of African-American pioneers in desegregation of higher education
