= 1941 Harvard–Navy lacrosse game =

Intercollegiate lacrosse game played in Annapolis, Maryland, US

The Harvard-Navy lacrosse game of 1941 was an intercollegiate lacrosse game played in Annapolis, Maryland, between the Harvard University Crimson and the United States Naval Academy Midshipmen on April 4, 1941. Before the game, the Naval Academy's superintendent told Harvard that the Navy team would not play against a racially integrated team. Harvard's one black player, Lucien Alexis Jr. of New Orleans, left of his own accord after Harvard's athletic director told Harvard's coach to send him home. Harvard's players, supported by their coach, Richard Snibbe, voted to forfeit the game rather than play without him. The game went on as scheduled. Both Harvard's and the Naval Academy's administrations were criticized for their actions.

== Game ==
On April 3, 1941, the Harvard lacrosse team's 18 players arrived at Annapolis, Maryland, to play the Naval Academy in a scheduled intercollegiate match. That day, the Naval Academy's superintendent, Rear Admiral Russell Willson discovered that Harvard's team included one black player, Lucien Alexis Jr. He informed Harvard's coach, Richard Snibbe, and athletic director, William J. Bingham, that Navy's squad would not play against a racially integrated team.

Angry at the Naval Academy's stance, Richard Snibbe and Alexis' teammates elected to forfeit the game and return to Harvard. Bingham intervened and ordered the Harvard coach to send Alexis home and play the game. Learning of Bingham's directive, Alexis voluntarily decided to depart and told his teammates that it was his idea. The game was played as scheduled the next day and Navy won 12–0.

== Reaction ==
Harvard's student newspaper, The Harvard Crimson, learned of the incident and sharply criticized Bingham and Harvard's administration. The newspaper said of the incident:

Those officials here who asked the negro to return to college should explain the reasons for their actions by which Harvard has kow-towed to Jim-Crowism. Navy bigwigs should also be taught that when this country, this college and the navy itself declare their faith in democratic equality, they mean to practice what they preach.

In response Bingham said: "We were guests of the Naval Academy and had no choice in the matter. Had the game been played at Cambridge, I would have insisted that he be allowed to participate."

Newspapers in Boston and New York City picked up the story and criticized Harvard's and the Naval Academy's administrations for their actions. The Harvard Council for Democracy in Education complained to U.S. President Franklin Delano Roosevelt about USNA's actions in the incident. The Harvard Corporation told Bingham and the Harvard Athletic Association to inform all future sports competitors that the school would not tolerate further racial discrimination against its student athletes.

One week after the incident, Alexis and the rest of Harvard's lacrosse team traveled to West Point, New York, to play a game against the United States Military Academy. In contrast to the reception the Navy had given Harvard's team, at West Point a cordon of cheering cadets, led by black cadets attending the academy, welcomed Alexis and his team.

Doris Kearns Goodwin counts this incident among several that pressured President Roosevelt, in June 1941, to sign Executive Order 8802 that prohibited racial discrimination in the defense industry.

== Later events ==
In 1949 Wesley A. Brown was the first black student to graduate from the Naval Academy. On May 10, 2008, a dedication ceremony was held on the Naval Academy campus for its newest building, the Wesley Brown Field House, named for him. Brown participated in the ribbon-cutting ceremony with Chairman of the Joint Chiefs of Staff Adm. Mike Mullen, Naval Academy Superintendent Vice Adm. Jeffrey L. Fowler, and Maryland Governor Martin O'Malley. Also present were almost one thousand guests.

Lucien Victor Alexis (1887-1981), Harvard '17, was commissioned as a first lieutenant in the US Army and later became the principal of the only black high school in New Orleans. His son Lucien Victor Alexis Jr. graduated from Harvard in turn and went into the service in World War II. After his return, he got a degree from Harvard Business School. He later served as head of a New Orleans business college for black students, segregated by state law. He married and had children. He died in 1975. His daughter Lurita Alexis Doan became an entrepreneur, owning her own business from 1990 to 2005, and approved as the first woman and second African American to serve as Administrator of the General Services Administration (2006 to 2008), during the administration of President George W. Bush.

== See also ==
- Golden Thirteen
- Port Chicago disaster
- USS Kitty Hawk riot
