= Wesley Brown Field House =

Sports arena at the United States Naval Academy in Annapolis, Maryland, US

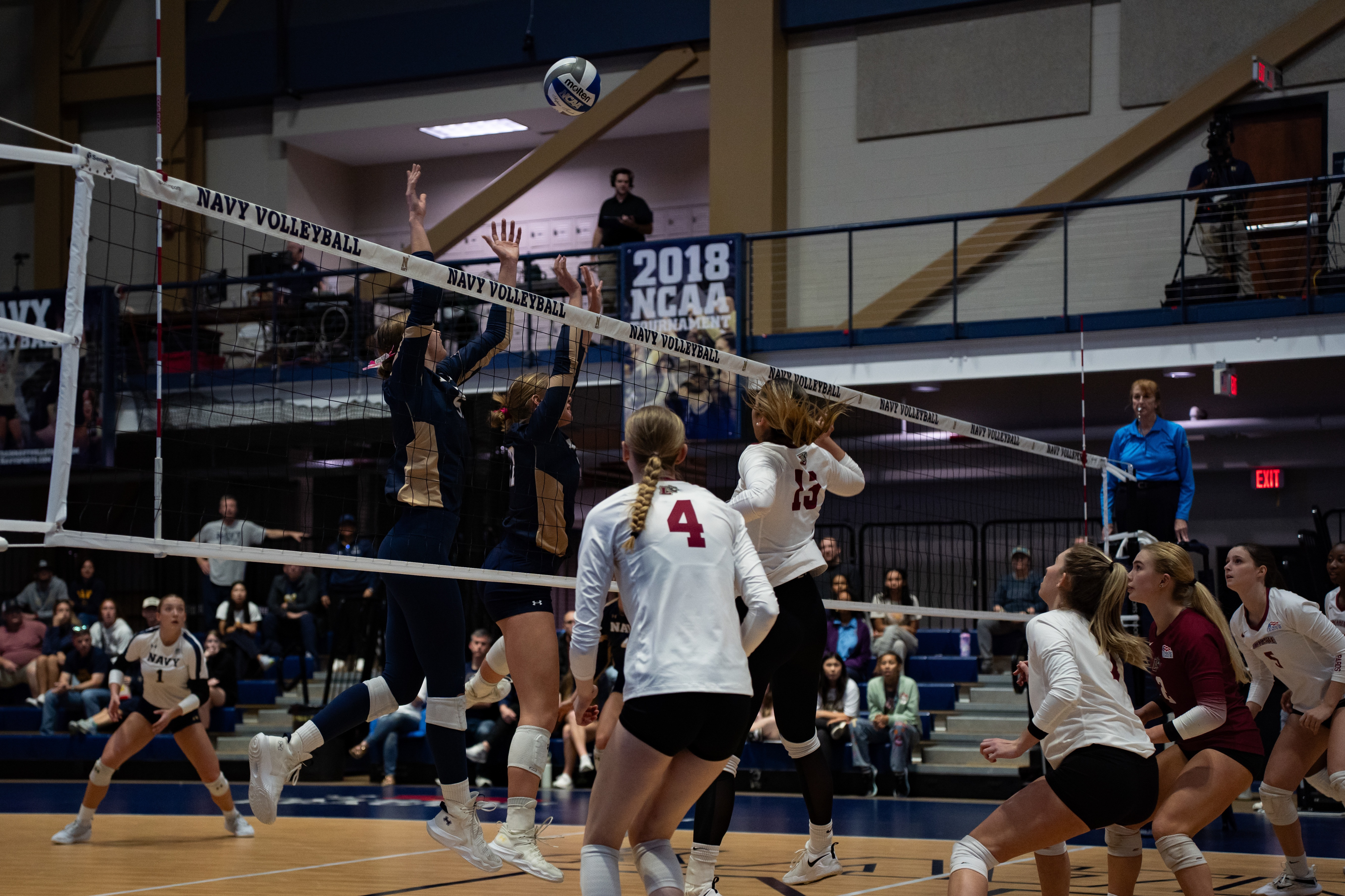
- Navy volleyball vs Lafayette
- Interactive map of Wesley Brown Field House
- Full name: Wesley Brown Field House
- Location: United States Naval Academy, Annapolis, Maryland
- Coordinates: 38°58′54″N 76°28′47″W
- Owner: United States Navy
- Operator: United States Naval Academy

Construction
- Groundbreaking: March 25, 2006
- Opened: 2008
- Cost: $50.0 million
- General contractor: Hensel Phelps Construction Company

Tenant
- Navy Midshipmen (PL) 2002–

The Wesley Brown Field House is a sports arena at the United States Naval Academy in Annapolis, Maryland. It is located between the 7th Wing of Bancroft Hall and Santee Basin. The 140,000-square-foot (13,000 m^{2}) facility houses physical education, varsity sports, club sports, and personal-fitness programs and equipment. It is home to the Midshipmen women's volleyball team, men's and women's indoor track and field teams, men's wrestling, women’s lacrosse team and sixteen club sports. It also serves as the practice space for the football and women's volleyball teams. There is also a centralized sports-medicine facility. The building has a total room area of 5,800 square feet (540 m^{2}), eight locker rooms, and 300 lockers.

The field house has a full-length, 76,000-square-foot (7,100 m^{2}), retractable Magic Carpet AstroTurf football field. When the field is retracted, students can then use the 200-meter AstroTurf track with a Mondo track surface and hydraulically-controlled banked curves and three permanent basketball courts. In four to six hours, the indoor track-and-field can be changed to an indoor football practice field, including target goalposts for placekicking practice. The synthetic playing surface (with football-field yard-lines) is stored on a spool at the field house's south end. The surface is put in place by nine winches and an 18-port air-blower that makes the turf float across the field-house floor while being deployed and retracted.

The weight room is one of three "strength and conditioning facilities" at the academy. With 6,500 square feet (600 m^{2}), it serves the members of the following teams: men's and women's cross country, men's and women's soccer, men's and women's track, golf, sprint football, volleyball, water polo, and women's lacrosse.

The facility is named for the first African American to graduate from the Academy, retired Lt. Cmdr. Wesley A. Brown, who graduated in 1949. The groundbreaking ceremony was held on March 25, 2006. Brown wielded a shovel in the groundbreaking. Hensel Phelps Construction Company constructed the field house, which was completed in March 2008. The U.S. Naval Facilities Engineering Command (NAVFAC) administered the contract for construction. The building was dedicated on May 10, 2008. Brown participated in the ribbon-cutting ceremony with Chairman of the Joint Chiefs of Staff Adm. Mike Mullen, Naval Academy Superintendent Vice Adm. Jeffrey L. Fowler, and Maryland Governor Martin O’Malley. Also present were almost one thousand guests.

== See also ==
- Navy Midshipmen § Facilities
- List of indoor arenas in the United States § Major college indoor arenas
- 1941 Harvard–Navy lacrosse game
