= Edward W. Jacko =

American civil rights attorney

Edward Willis Jacko Jr. (April 16, 1916 – January 30, 1979) was an American civil rights attorney. He represented the Nation of Islam as a client.

== Biography ==
Jacko graduated from Talladega College in 1938 and played football and was in Alpha Phi Alpha at the college. He applied to University of Arkansas Law School, the first African American applicant in the school's history, and went to Howard University School of Law. Charles Hamilton Houston was one of his law professors.

Jacko graduated from Howard University's law school in 1942, he passed the New York Bar exam and went to work there as a lawyer before enlisting in the Army. Upon his return to civilian life he established a law office on 125th Street in New York City, he shared with civil rights lawyer Jawn Sandifer.

Sandifer and Jacko worked together for the NAACP New York City office. Jacko represented clients discriminated against and on police brutality cases. His success brought him Malcolm X, the Nation of Islam and Muhammad Ali as clients. He represented a Nation of Islam mosque in Newark, New Jersey that was ransacked in a police raid. Jacko also represented Muslims seeking to practice their religion while in prison.

Jacko died January 30, 1979, at the age of 62, and a service in his honor was held at St. Albans Congregational Church in the neighborhood of Jamaica in Queens, New York. He was preceded in death by his wife Shirley, and survived by his two children Edward III and Candice.
