= Association of American Law Schools =

Organization of United States law schools

- Formation: 1900; 126 years ago
- Type: Learned society
- Headquarters: Washington, D.C.
- Location: U.S.
- Official language: English
- President: Danielle Conway (since January 2026)
- Executive Director and CEO: Kellye Y. Testy
- Key people: Austen Parrish; Kevin K. Washburn
- Website: www.aals.org

The Association of American Law Schools (AALS), formed in 1900, is a non-profit organization of 174 law schools in the United States. An additional 20 schools pay a fee to receive services but are not members. AALS incorporated as a 501(c)(3) non-profit educational organization in 1971. The association is a member of both the American Council on Education and the American Council of Learned Societies. Its headquarters are in Washington, D.C.

== History ==
AALS was founded in 1900 by 32 charter law schools with the express purpose of improving legal education in the United States. James Bradley Thayer, a member of the Harvard Law Faculty, served as the association's first president.

In August 1905, a new quarterly law publication was announced in the annual meeting held in Fort Wayne, Indiana. Henry Wade Rogers, dean of Yale Law School served as the president and 25 law schools were represented.

== Leadership ==
Austen Parrish, dean of University of California, Irvine School of Law, became president of AALS on January 11, 2025. The president-elect is Danielle Conway, dean of Penn State Dickinson Law, and Melanie D. Wilson, dean of Washington and Lee University School of Law, is the immediate past president.

Kellye Y. Testy was named executive director and chief executive officer in January 2024 and started in the role in July 2024. Prior to joining AALS, Testy served as president and CEO of Law School Admission Council, dean of University of Washington School of Law and dean of Seattle University School of Law.

Judith Areen served as executive director and chief executive officer of AALS from 2014 to 2024. Prior to coming to AALS, Areen was on the faculty of Georgetown University Law Center where she served as dean from 1989 to 2004 and as interim dean in 2010.

== Meetings ==
AALS hosts a number of events throughout the year. The AALS Conference on Clinical Legal Education is the association's second largest conference with the 2015 conference having approximately 700 clinicians in attendance. The conference's sessions focus on practice areas and common areas of concern for clinicians.

=== Annual meeting ===
Each year, AALS hosts a meeting for thousands of legal educators. The meeting location rotates between New Orleans, New York, San Diego, San Francisco, and Washington, D.C.. The theme of the meeting is chosen by the incoming President of AALS. Much of the event's programming is generated by the Association's Sections, which are volunteer groups of members with shared interests.

== Publication ==
AALS publishes The Journal of Legal Education, which focuses on teaching methods, scholarship, and other issues facing legal education and the profession.

== Involvement in the Solomon Amendment ==
The AALS requires its members to follow a nondiscrimination policy regarding "race, color, religion, national origin, sex, age, disability, or sexual orientation" and for member law schools to require this of any employer to which it gives access for recruitment.

The United States Armed Forces' "don't ask, don't tell" (DADT) policy was seen by the AALS as impermissible discrimination. However, the AALS excused its members from blocking access to the military since the passage of the Solomon Amendment, which denies federal funding to the parent university of a law school as well as the school itself if military recruiters are not given full campus access. However, the AALS at the time required schools to take "ameliorative" measures when allowing military recruiters on campus, including placing "warning" signs on campus when military recruiting takes place, scheduling interviews off campus away from "core" areas, "prohibit[ing] entirely the delivery of discretionary support services" to military recruiters, charging military employers who use law school resources "reasonable fees for use of law school staff, facilities and services," etc. The AALS at the time encouraged law schools to deny benefits to military recruiters that they would ordinarily provide employers, such as coffee and free parking. Specifically, the AALS wrote in a memo to all law school deans in the United States:

The main point of this Report therefore is that reasonable access does not dictate equal access. Though schools should conduct themselves professionally regarding the military on this issue, the language of the law does not obligate schools to do anything else beyond providing reasonable access; within the bounds of professional conduct, reasonable access does not in the Section's view imply that schools are obligated to provide other free services or amenities (such as, perhaps, scheduling appointment times, collecting and transmitting resumes, free parking, endless supplies of coffee, snacks or lunches and the like). Beyond providing the "reasonable access" mentioned in the law, schools should avoid entanglement with military on-campus activities and devote their energies and resources to maximizing amelioration.

The AALS engaged in litigation challenging the Solomon Amendment as violative of the First Amendment (see e.g., Rumsfeld v. Forum for Academic and Institutional Rights, Inc.). In an interesting coincidence, The Judge Advocate General's School of the United States Army is a fee-paying nonmember of AALS.

Although DADT has been ended, and although President Barack Obama called upon college campuses to welcome military recruiters during his 2011 State of the Union address, some law professors have questioned why the AALS has issued no statement declaring an end to its recommendations.

== See also ==
- American Bar Association
- Law School Admission Council
- Law School Admission Test
