= Janie L. Mines =

American former naval officer

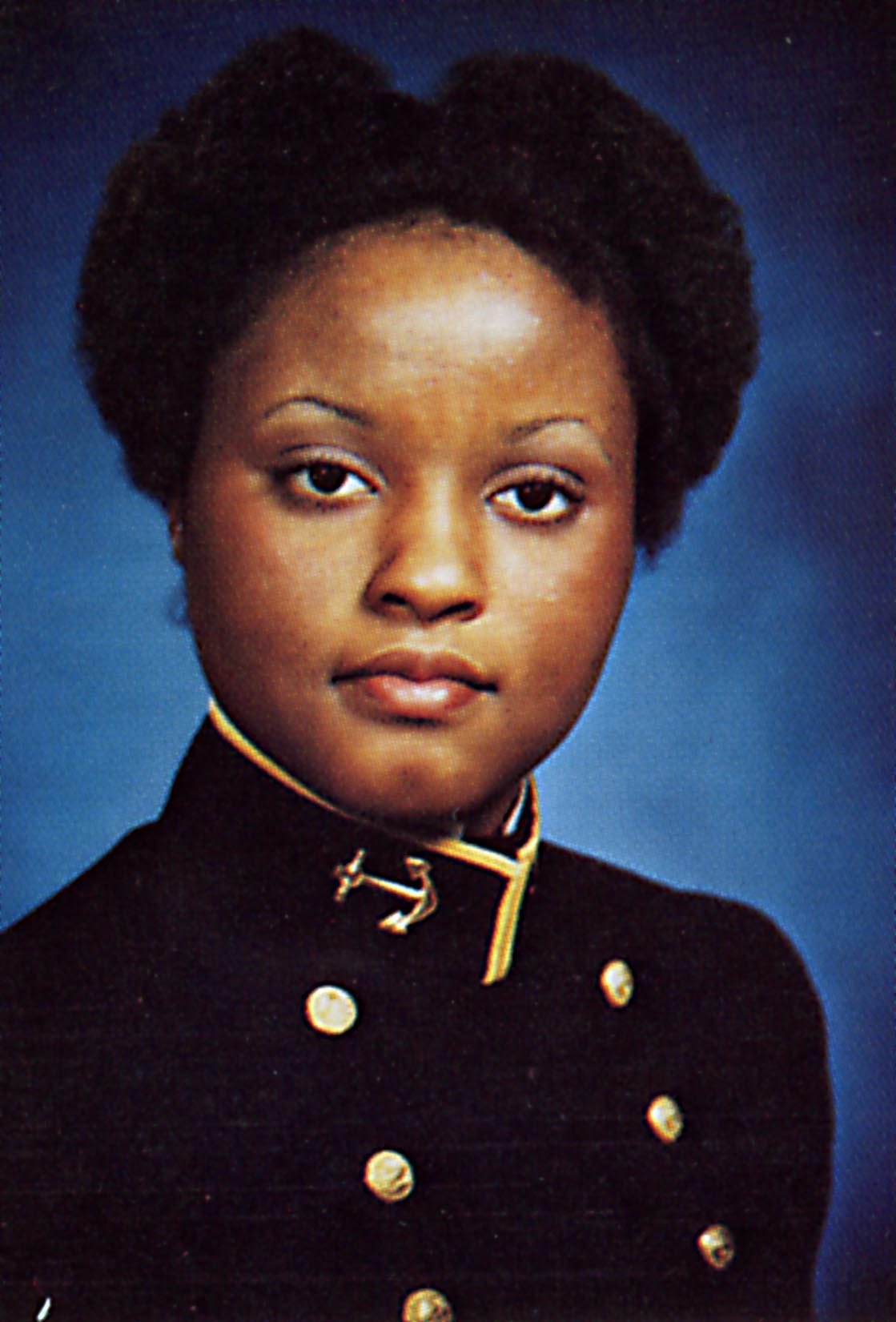
- Midshipman Janie L. Mines in 1980
- Born: 1958 (age 67–68); Aiken, South Carolina
- Occupations: U.S. Navy; Manager in various corporations; Management consultant
- Known for: First African-American woman to graduate from the U.S. Naval Academy (1980)

Janie L. Mines (born 1958) is an American former naval officer who was the first African-American woman to graduate from the United States Naval Academy, where she earned a Bachelor of Science in 1980. After serving in a variety of roles in the U.S. Navy, she held management positions in a variety of corporations and became a management consultant. In 2002, she was an Olympic torchbearer.

== Early life ==
Mines was born in 1958 in Aiken, South Carolina. Her mother is Daisy Sheppard Mines, her father is Reverend William L. Mines, a Baptist minister, and she has a younger sister, Gwen. She graduated from Aiken High School in 1976, where she had been a member of the Navy Junior Reserve Officers' Training Corps JROTC unit, a National Honor Society Student, and was her graduating Class Salutatorian.

== Naval career ==
In August 1975, the U.S. Congress authorized the admittance of women to its military service academies. Mines was the first and only African-American woman of the 81 women who entered the U.S. Naval Academy (USNA) in 1976. While at the Academy, Mines was a member of the fencing team, squad leader, midshipman drill officer, and regimental adjutant. She is reported to have found the experience hard and disillusioning, but valuable in learning how to deal with, and make progress in, the system.

In 1980, Mines became the first African-American woman to graduate from the USNA, and her sister graduated from USNA the following year. Mines graduated with the rank of Ensign, and a B.S. in general engineering.

A knee injury in 1978 had ended Mines' plans for a career in the Marines. After graduation, she trained as a supply officer and was assigned to a supervisor position at the Naval Training Center Orlando. She then served in the naval annex at The Pentagon, and aboard the USS Emory S. Land. Mines also served as a senior advisor on the staff of the Secretary of the Navy.

== Post-navy career ==
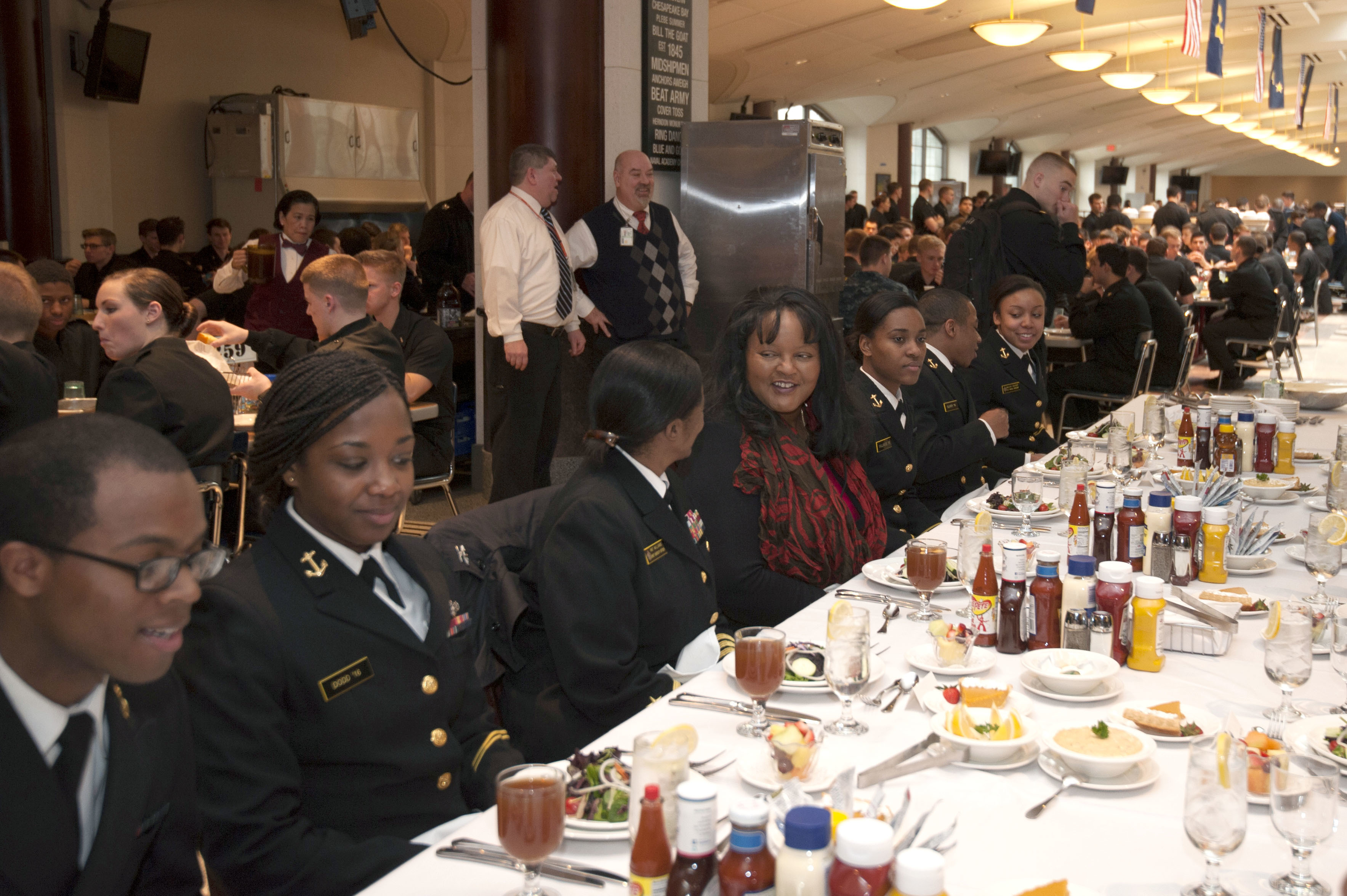
Janie Mines (red and black scarf), Black History Month 2015, lunch with the brigade of Midshipmen, U.S. Naval Academy

Mines left the Navy to earn a Masters of Business Administration from the Massachusetts Institute of Technology (MIT), with a 1998 thesis entitled "Integrated change management". She held positions in management in several corporations, including Procter & Gamble and Hershey Foods, and was Senior Vice President of Strategic Sourcing at Bank of America. She has been a management consultant and is a member of the Defense Advisory Committee on Women in the Services (DACOWITS).

== Honors ==
In 2002, Mines was a torchbearer in the Olympic Torch Relay, and has received local civic awards. She was honored by the Navy with a Business Achievement Award in 2010. She was also subject of a USNA video, Courage.

== See also ==
- List of African-American pioneers in desegregation of higher education
- Wesley Brown – first African-American graduate of the U.S. Naval Academy
