= W. J. Bingham =

American athletics coach and administrator

- Bingham in 1930

Biographical details
- Born: August 8, 1889
- Died: September 7, 1971 (aged 82); Delray Beach, Florida, U.S.

Playing career
- c. 1915: Harvard
- Positions: 440-yard, 880-yard

Coaching career (HC unless noted)
- 1921–1922: Harvard

Administrative career (AD unless noted)
- 1926–1951: Harvard

William John Bingham (August 8, 1889 – September 7, 1971) was an American college track and field athlete, coach, and athletics administrator.

Bingham attended Harvard University and set school records in track in the 440- and 880-yard runs.

After graduating from Harvard in 1916, Bingham moved to Texas. During World War I, he served in France with the American Field Service and later with the United States Army. He received the Croix de Guerre and attained the rank of captain.

After the war, he became the track coach at Harvard, a position he left in 1922 to work in the import business. In 1926, he was appointed as Harvard's first athletic director, a position he held for more than 25 years.

In 1941, during Bingham's tenure as athletic director, the U.S. Naval Academy refused to play a scheduled match against Harvard's racially integrated lacrosse team. Harvard's coach declined to remove the team's sole black player, Lucien Alexis Jr., from the game. Bingham intervened by ordering Alexis back to Cambridge and forcing the team to play without him. Students organized a wide-spread campaign to protest Bingham's actions and, soon thereafter, the Harvard Athletic Association announced the school would no longer withdraw players because of their race.

Bingham was forced from his position in 1951 after the 1949 and 1950 Harvard Crimson football teams compiled records of 1–8 and 1–7.

Bingham also served from 1933 to 1950 on the NCAA's football rules committee, many of those years as the committee's chairman. He also served on the United States Olympic Committee's executive committee.

Bingham later served with the Central Intelligence Agency in Indonesia. After retiring, he lived in Virginia and later in Florida. He died on September 7, 1971, in Delray Beach, Florida.
