= Jasmine Huggins =

Kittian and Nevisian diplomat

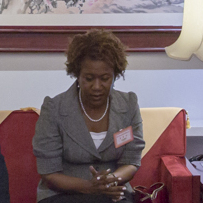
- Education: Howard University School of Law
- Occupation: diplomat
- Known for: long-serving ambassador to Taiwan
- Predecessor: new position

Jasmine Elise Huggins is a Kittian and Nevisian diplomat. She was the most long-serving ambassador to Taiwan during her twelve years at Taipei.

== Life ==
Huggins comes from the small city of Basseterre, the capital of St Kitts. When she was a small child her family moved to New York, where she was brought up.

Huggins studied in Washington and graduated with a law degree from the Howard University School of Law. She then worked for her country's embassy in Washington where she worked for the OAS, negotiating inter-American declarations, conventions and resolutions.

She was given the task of establishing an embassy in Taiwan and she went there as the Chargé d'affaires. After two years she was promoted to the position of Ambassador Extraordinary and Plenipotentiary of St. Kitts and Nevis to the Republic of China (Taiwan). She was welcomed in that position by President Ma Ying-jeou. Her embassy looks after her country's interests and the visitors from St Kitts which includes a good number of exchange students thanks to a special programme.

In 2022 there was a new government in St Kitts and Nevis ... Terrance Drew.. and an early decision was to ask Huggins to stand down as the ambassador to Taiwan in September. This decision caused controversy as there appeared to be no reason and Huggins thirteen year role as ambassador was described as "exemplorary". Huggins was thanked by Tsai Ing-wen the President of Taiwan for her twelve years of service as ambassador. She had been the most long-serving Taipei ambassador.
