= Roger Fairfax =

American lawyer

Dean of the Howard University School of Law
- Incumbent
- Assumed office July 1, 2024
- Preceded by: Lisa Crooms-Robinson

Personal details
- Born: Roger Anthony Fairfax Jr.
- Spouse: Lisa Fairfax
- Children: 3
- Relatives: Justin Fairfax (brother)
- Education: Harvard University (BA, JD); University of London (MA)
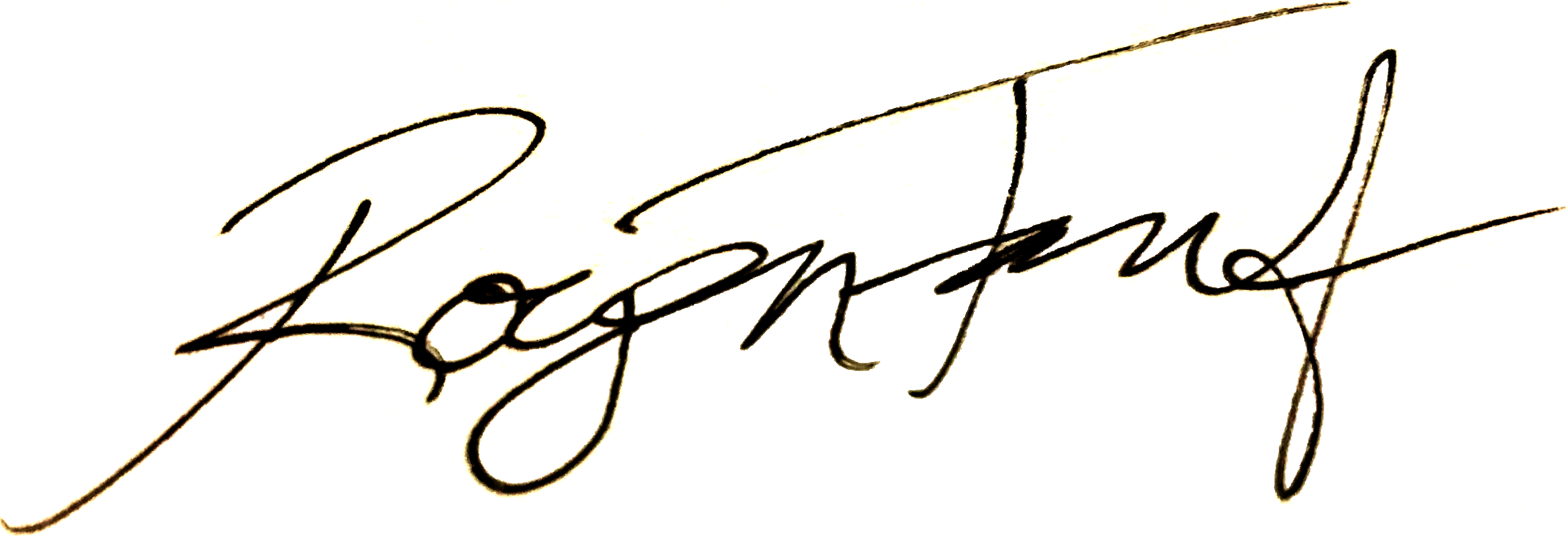
- Signature

Roger Anthony Fairfax Jr. is an American legal scholar who has been the dean of the Howard University School of Law since 2024.

== Education ==
Roger Fairfax Jr. attended Archbishop Carroll High School in Washington, D.C. He then attended Harvard College before completing a master's degree from the University of London. While a student at Harvard Law School, Fairfax edited the Harvard Law Review. He was a law clerk for Patti B. Saris and later Judith W. Rogers.

== Family ==
Roger Fairfax Jr. is the eldest son of Roger Sr. and Charlene Fairfax. Fairfax Jr.'s youngest brother, Justin Fairfax, served as lieutenant governor of Virginia from 2018 to 2022. The Fairfax family can trace its ancestry to Simon Fairfax, a slave freed by Thomas Fairfax, 9th Lord Fairfax of Cameron.

Roger Fairfax Jr. and his wife Lisa Fairfax raised three children.

== Career ==
Fairfax is an elected member of the American Law Institute. Fairfax was a federal prosecutor and worked for O'Melveny & Myers before joining the George Washington University Law School faculty, where he served as Patricia Roberts Harris Research Professor of Law until 2021, when he was appointed dean of the Washington College of Law at American University. In 2024, Fairfax became dean of the Howard University School of Law. Fairfax is also the chair of Archbishop Carroll High School's board of directors.
