= Zephyr Moore Ramsey =

American lawyer

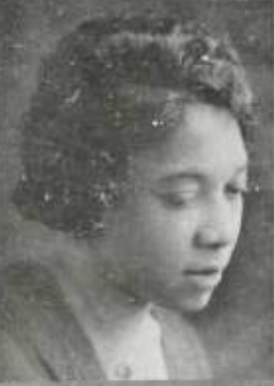
- Zephyr Moore (later Ramsey), from the 1922 yearbook of Howard University professional schools
- Born: Zephyr Abigail Moore; January 17, 1893; Tennessee
- Died: October 6, 1984 (aged 91); Los Angeles, California
- Occupation: Lawyer

Zephyr Abigail Moore Ramsey (January 17, 1893 – October 6, 1984) was an American lawyer. Her 1922 essay "Law and its Call to Women" has been reprinted and studied in recent years. She was one of the first Black women to be admitted to the bar in California.

== Early life and education ==
Zephyr Abigail Moore was born in Tennessee and raised in Southern California. She is the daughter of James C. Moore and Molly Catherine H. Stoner Moore. She graduated from Pasadena High School, attended Knoxville College (class of 1911) and Howard University Teachers' College. She earned a law degree from Howard University School of Law in 1922. She was a founding member of Epsilon Sigma Iota.

Moore wrote "Law and its Call to Women", an essay for the 1922 yearbook of Howard's professional schools. The essay continues to be printed and studied after nearly a century.

== Career ==
Moore taught at Livingston College in North Carolina as a young woman. During World War I, Moore worked in Washington, for the War Trade Board and for the Bureau of War Risk Insurance. She had a law practice in St. Louis, Missouri from 1925 to 1930. In widowhood she was one of the first Black women admitted to the bar in California, in September 1930. In 1934 she was one of the guests of honor at a "Negro Historical Program" in Pasadena. She worked for the Federal Emergency Relief Administration during the Depression. After World War II, she returned to Los Angeles to practice family law, and lived with her sister Elizabeth in Pasadena.

Ramsey was a member of the Blackstone Lawyers Club in Los Angeles. In 1949, she was legal advisor to the newly formed Crown City Real Estate Brokers' Exchange, an organization for Black real estate brokers in Pasadena. She supported Mary Durham in a run for a County Democratic Central Committee seat in 1952. She served on the executive board of the Pasadena branch of the NAACP.

== Personal life and legacy ==
Moore married Chicago lawyer Fred Douglas Ramsey. Her husband died in 1930. Zephyr Ramsey died in 1984, at the age of 91, in Los Angeles. Her grave is with those of her parents and siblings, in Angelus- Rosedale Cemetery. The Harriett Buhai Center for Family Law in Los Angeles gave an annual Zephyr M. Ramsey Award from 1995 to 2012.
