= Danielle Conway =

American legal scholar (born 1968)

Dean of Penn State Dickinson Law
- Incumbent
- Assumed office 2019

Personal details
- Born: Danielle Monique Conway; 26 April 1968 (age 58) Philadelphia, Pennsylvania, U.S.
- Spouse: Emmanuel Quainoo
- Education: New York University (BS); Howard University (JD); George Washington University (LLM)

Military service
- Branch/service: Maine Army National Guard; United States Army
- Years of service: c. 1989–2016
- Rank: Lieutenant Colonel
- Unit: Judge Advocate General Corps

Danielle Monique Conway (born April 26, 1968) is an American lawyer and academic. She has served as the Dean of Penn State Dickinson Law since 2019 and is an expert in government procurement law and intellectual property law. In late July 2026 the Law School announced that she would be leaving her post and returning to academia.

Some believe that the somewhat abrupt departure may have to do with the congressional task force hearings on law school accreditation. A former student testified against the mandatory first year course on Critical Race Theory and admission of continued and systemic racism.

== Background ==
Born in Pennsylvania, Conway is an African-American. She graduated with a B.S. in International Business and Finance from New York University in New York City in 1989, later earning a Juris Doctor, cum laude, from Howard University School of Law in Washington, D.C., in 1992 and a dual LL.M. from George Washington University Law School in Washington, D.C., in 1996, in Government Procurement Law and Environmental Law.

== Career ==
Her scholarship is focused on advancing the public interest through insights into technology and innovation and their impact on modern society. She is an advocate of "social entrepreneurism," with an emphasis on empowering Indigenous Peoples and minority groups to effectively and creatively use business, innovation, and intellectual property rights and protections to build capacity within those communities. Prior to her appointment at Penn State Dickinson Law, she served as the Dean of University of Maine School of Law She was also previously the Michael J. Marks Distinguished Professor of Business Law at the William S. Richardson School of Law at University of Hawaiʻi at Mānoa, where she served as Director of the Hawaiʻi Procurement Institute. Conway retired from the U.S. Army in 2016 with the rank of lieutenant colonel after 27 years of combined active, reserve, and national guard service.

She is also the President of the Association of American Law Schools.

== Scholarship ==
Among other writings, Conway is the author and coauthor of several books:

- Survey of United States Government Contracts Law: Policy, Principles, and Practice
- State and Local Government Procurement
- Intellectual Property in Government Transactions
- Transnational Intellectual Property Law
- Intellectual Property, Software, and Information Licensing: Law and Practice
- Licensing Intellectual Property: Theory and Application
- Intellectual Property, Entrepreneurship and Social Justice: From Swords to Ploughshares
