= Howard University School of Law =

Law school in Washington, DC

Coordinates: 38.9437°N 77.0584°W

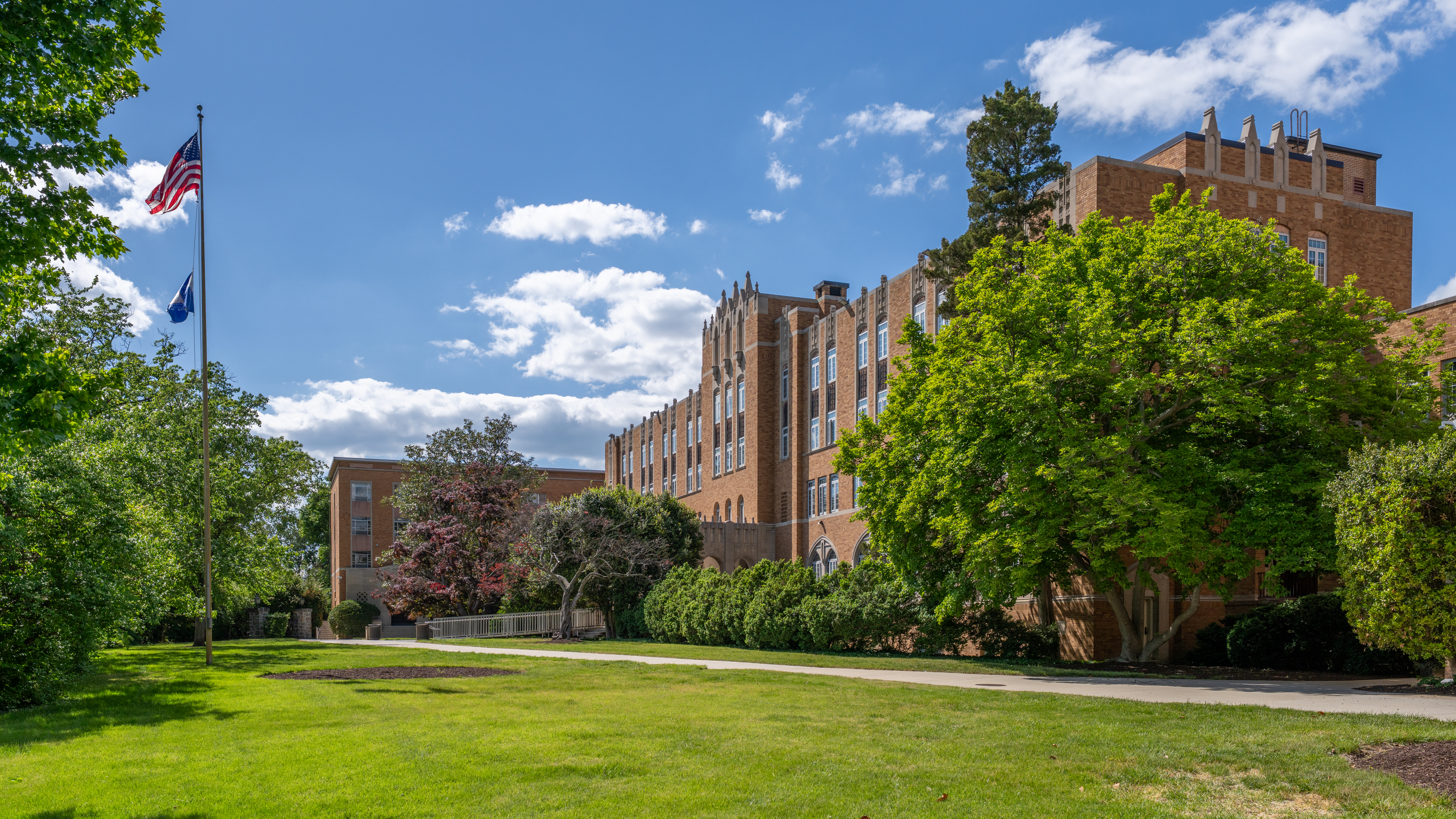
- Motto: Veritas et Utilitas
- Parent school: Howard University
- Established: 1869
- School type: Private law school
- Dean: Roger Fairfax
- Location: Washington, D.C., U.S.
- Enrollment: 464
- Faculty: 37 full-time, 63 part-time
- USNWR ranking: 130th (2024)
- Bar pass rate: 82% (2023)
- Website: law.howard.edu

Howard University School of Law (Howard Law or HUSL) is the law school of Howard University, a private, federally chartered historically black research university in Washington, D.C. It is one of the oldest law schools in the country and the oldest historically black law school in the United States.

Howard University School of Law confers about 185 Juris Doctor and Master of Law degrees annually to students from the United States and countries in South America, the Caribbean, Africa, and Asia. The school was accredited by the American Bar Association and the Association of American Law Schools in 1931.

== History ==
Howard University opened its legal department, led by John Mercer Langston, on January 6, 1869. The founders of Howard Law recognized "a great need to train lawyers who would have a strong commitment to helping black Americans secure and protect their newly established rights" during the country's tumultuous Reconstruction era.

The first class consisted of six students who met three evenings a week in the homes and offices of the department's four teachers. Classes were held in various locations throughout the years before the law school settled into its current location at 2900 Van Ness Street N.W. in 1974. At the time, the LL.B program required only two years of study. Ten students were awarded degrees at the first commencement ceremony, which was held on February 3, 1871.

The school was accredited by the American Bar Association and the Association of American Law Schools in 1931.

=== Women at Howard Law ===
Howard Law was the first school in the nation to have a non-discriminatory admissions policy. From its founding, it admitted white male and female students along with black students. It was a progressive policy at the time to admit women, but only eight women graduated from Howard Law during the first 30 years of its existence.

An 1890 review of women lawyers in the United States published in The Green Bag, found that many women had difficulty being admitted to law school, or gaining admission to the bar, and practice, even at Howard.

Charlotte E. Ray was admitted to Howard's law program in 1869 and graduated in 1872, becoming its first black female lawyer. It is reported that Ray applied for admission to the bar using initials for her given and middle names, in order to disguise her gender, because she was "[a]ware of the school's reluctant commitment to the principle of sexual equality."

Mary Ann Shadd Cary was among four women enrolled in the law school in 1880. She said in 1890 that she had actually been admitted to Howard's law program in September 1869, prior to Ray. However, Cary claims she was barred from graduating on time because of her gender and did not graduate until 1883.

Eliza A. Chambers, an early white female graduate of Howard's law program, was admitted in 1885 and successfully completed the three-year course of study, earning two diplomas. But, "the Law School faculty refused to hand in [Eliza's] name to the examiners, for admission to practice, omitting her from the list of her male classmates whom they recommended, simply because she was a woman." After that, she succeeded in entering practice.

=== Ties to the civil rights movement ===
Howard University School of Law has significant ties to the civil rights movement. Former HUSL Dean Charles Hamilton Houston's work for the NAACP earned him the title of "The Man Who Killed Jim Crow." Thurgood Marshall, a 1933 graduate of Howard Law, successfully argued the landmark Brown v. Board of Education case before the U.S. Supreme Court and in 1967 became the first African-American Supreme Court Justice. In 1950, Howard law graduate Pauli Murray published States' Laws on Race and Color, an examination and critique of state segregation laws throughout the nation. Thurgood Marshall called the book the "bible" of the civil rights movement. In 1952 and again in 1953, two HUSL professors, James Nabrit Jr. and George E. C. Hayes, successfully argued the landmark Supreme Court case Bolling v. Sharpe, a companion case to Brown v. Board of Education.

== Academics ==
=== Curriculum ===
First year students at Howard Law are required to take courses on civil procedure; constitutional law; contracts; criminal law; legislation and regulation; legal reasoning, research, and writing; real property; and torts. Students must also take courses on evidence and professional responsibility and fulfill the school's scholarly writing requirement.

The school offered 126 courses beyond the first year curriculum in the 2021-22 academic year.

=== Degrees offered ===
Howard University School of Law offers the Juris Doctor (J.D.) and the Master of Laws (LL.M.). Additionally, students can enroll in the four-year J.D./M.B.A. dual degree program with the Howard University School of Business.

HUSL students can also earn a certificate in family law.

=== Faculty ===
As of 2022, Howard Law employed 37 full-time faculty and 63 non-full-time faculty. The school's student-faculty ratio accounting for full-time faculty was 12.5 to 1. Over 80 percent of faculty members are people of color.

==== Deans ====
Name	Took office	Left office
John Mercer Langston	1869	1875
William Bascom	1875	1877
John Hartwell Cook	1877	1878
Richard T. Greener	1878	1880
Warren C. Stone	1880	1881
Benjamin F. Leighton	1882	1921
Mason N. Richardson	1921	1921
Fenton W. Booth	1922	1930
Charles Hamilton Houston	1930	1935
William E. Taylor	1935	1939
William Henry Hastie	1939	1946
George M. Johnson, Jr.	1946	1958
James Nabrit, Jr.	1958	1960
Spottswood Robinson III	1960	1963
Clarence Clyde Ferguson, Jr.	1963	1969
Patricia Roberts Harris	1969	1969
James A. Worthington, Jr. (interim)	1969	1970
Paul E. Miller	1970	1972
Herbert O. Reid (interim)	1972	1974
Charles T. Duncan, Jr.	1974	1977
Wiley A. Branton	1978	1983
Oliver Morse (interim)	1983	1985
John T. Baker	1985	1986
J. Clay Smith, Jr.	1986	1988
Daniel O. Bernstine (interim)	1988	1990
Alice Bullock (interim)	1990	1990
Henry T. Ramsey, Jr.	1990	1996
Alice Bullock	1997	2002
Patricia M. Worthy (interim)	2002	2002
Kurt L. Schmoke	2003	2012
Okianer Dark	2012	2014
Danielle R. Holley-Walker	2014	2023
Lisa Crooms-Robinson	2023	2024
Roger Fairfax	2024	present

=== Programs and clinics ===
Howard Law boasts three institutes and centers: the Education Rights Center, the Institute of Intellectual Property and Social Justice, and the World Food Law Institute.

The school's Clinical Law Center also offers eight in-house legal clinics that provide students with first-hand legal experience as well as an Externship and Equal Justice Program. These clinics are:

- Alternative Dispute Resolution Clinic
- Child Welfare Clinic
- Civil Rights Clinic
- Criminal Justice Clinic
- Fair Housing Clinic
- Intellectual Property and Trademark Clinic
- Investor Justice and Education Clinic
- Movement Lawyering Clinic

=== Publications ===
Howard Law has published the student-managed Howard Law Journal since 1955. The school also publishes the Howard Human & Civil Rights Law Review, formerly known as the Human Rights & Globalization Law Review and the successor to the Howard Scroll: Social Justice Law Review.

The Barrister is the HUSL student-edited newspaper.

The school publishes a news journal, The Jurist, and the Howard Docket newsletter. For the school's 140th anniversary, the school published A Legacy of Defending the Constitution: A Pictorial History Book of Howard University School of Law (1869-2009).

== Student life ==
Howard Law enrolled 464 J.D. students for the 2021-2022 academic year, 100% of whom were enrolled full-time. The student body is two-thirds women, and just over three-fourths of J.D. students identify as Black or African-American. About 15% identify as multiracial, with small numbers of students who are Hispanic, Asian, White, or another group. As of 2022, the law school admitted 31 percent of applicants. HUSL students may participate in 26 extra-curricular groups, including the moot court team, associations focused on specific areas of law, law fraternities, and political, ethnic, and religious affiliation groups.

== Campus ==
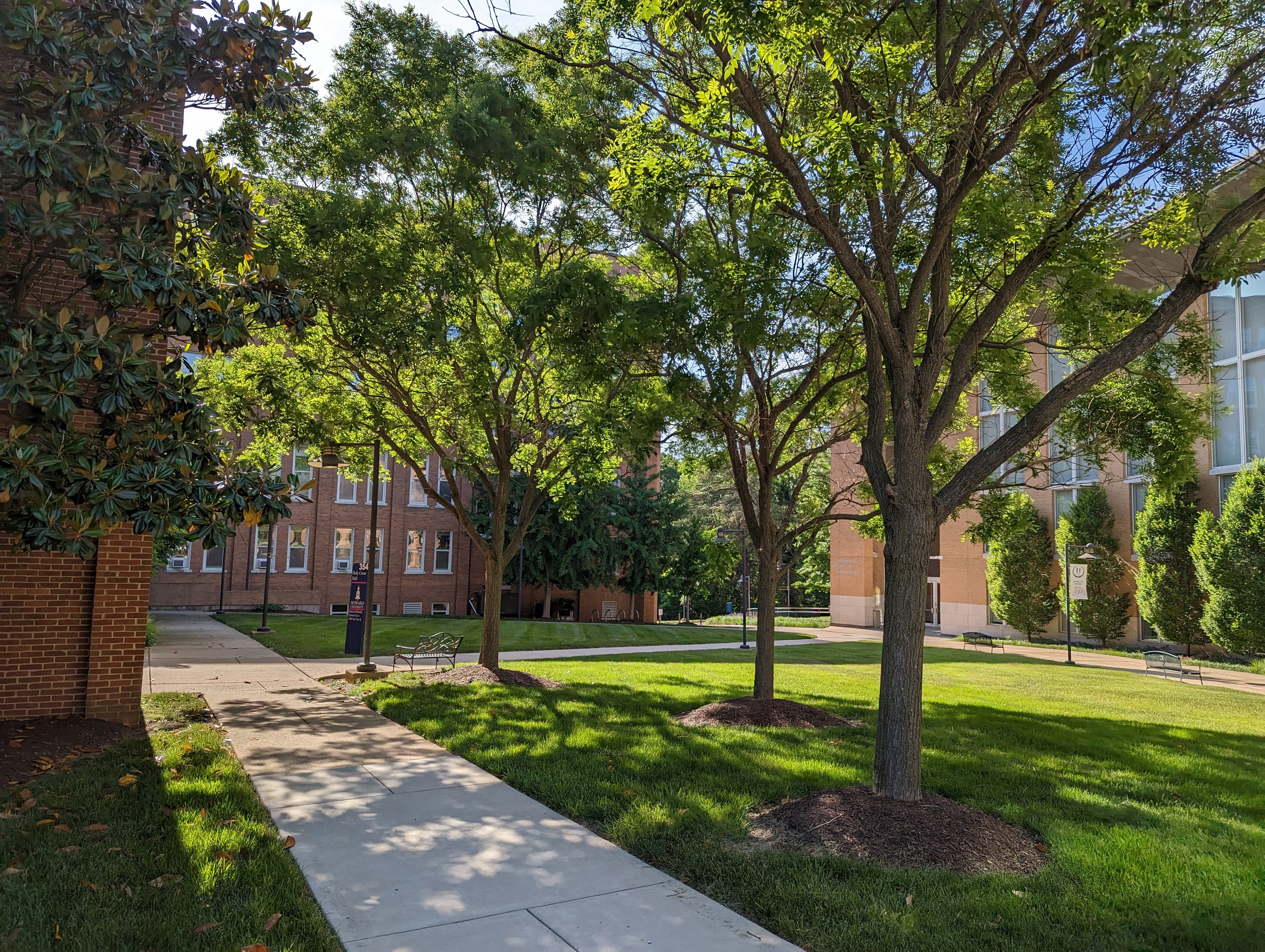
The campus

The campus is located at 2900 Van Ness St NW, Washington, DC 20008 in the upper Northwest quadrant of Washington, D.C., in the Forest Hills area of the city. It is a few blocks from the University of the District of Columbia, the former headquarters of Intelsat and the Van Ness–UDC station on the Washington Metro. The law school is located on its own 22-acre (89,000 m^{2}) campus approximately five miles from the main campus.

The campus was built by Dunbarton College of the Holy Cross, which built it in the 1930s and occupied it until the school closed in 1973. Howard purchased the campus in 1974 and moved its law school to it the same year. The law school shares the campus with Howard's School of Divinity.

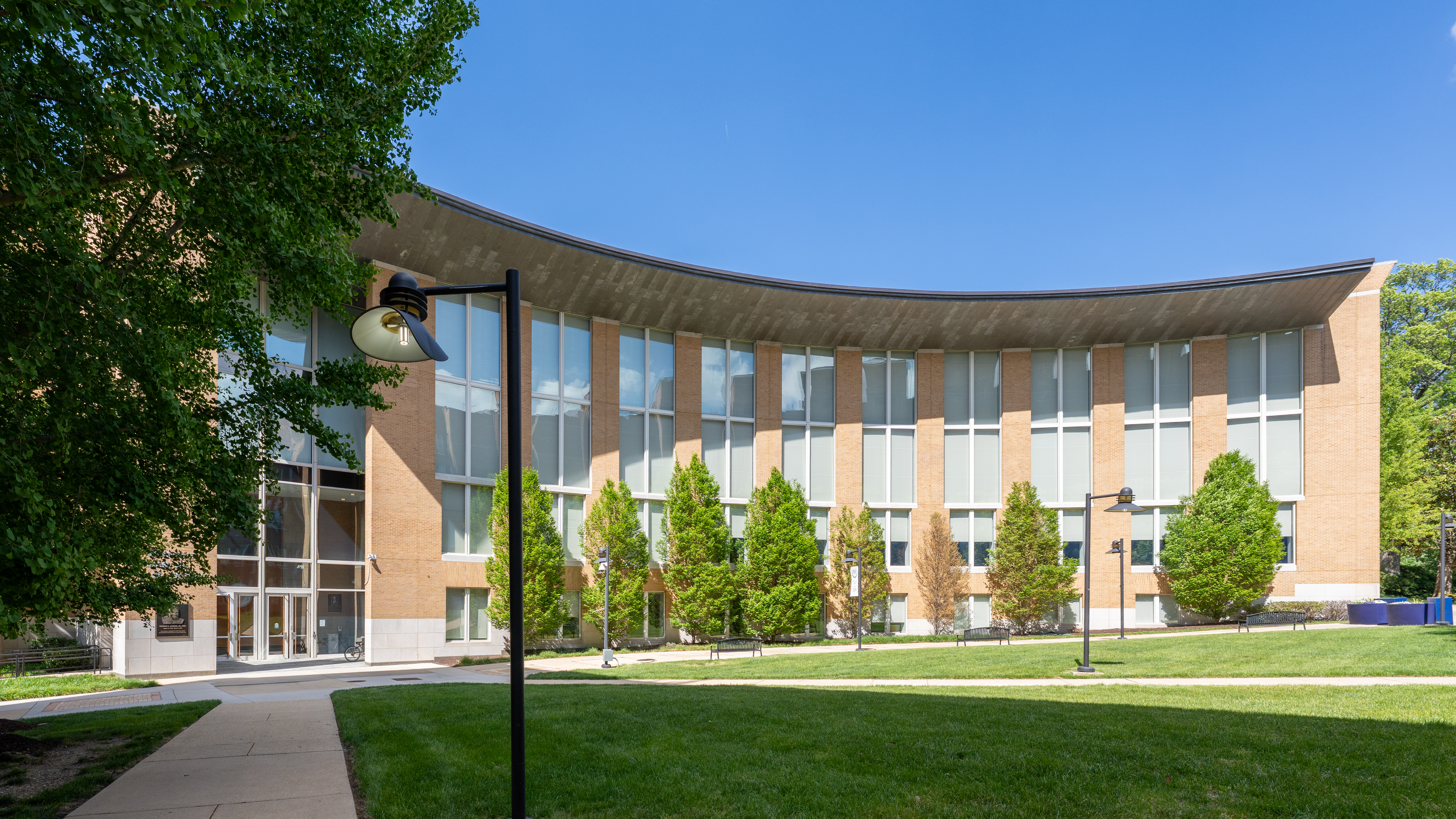
Vernon E. Jordan, Jr. Law Library

The school's main building, Houston Hall, is named after Charles Hamilton Houston. The library was named after Vernon Jordan after his death in March 2021.

== Admissions ==
Howard Law had a 31% acceptance rate in 2022 with the school receiving 1,813 applications. The school's matriculation rate was 28% with 160 of the 565 admits enrolling. The median LSAT score for students enrolling in HUSL in 2022 was 154 (60th percentile) and the median GPA was 3.49.

== Employment ==
According to Howard Law's official 2022 ABA-required disclosures, 78% of the Class of 2022 obtained full-time, long-term, bar passage-required employment nine months after graduation. HUSL's full-time long-term bar passage-required employment rate for 2022 graduates was similar to the national average of 77% for ABA-approved law schools, estimated ten months after graduation.

According to the National Directory of Legal Employers, 128 firms conduct on-campus interviews at Howard Law and includes elite firms like Debevoise & Plimpton, which only conducts interviews at 25 law schools. In terms of elite placement as of 2013, while more than 60% students who graduated from Yale Law School and Cornell Law School in 2013 were hired for federal clerkships or at law firms with more than 250 employees, only 13% of 2013 Howard Law graduates secured such positions.

Howard Law's Law School Transparency under-employment score is 10%, indicating the percentage of the Class of 2022 unemployed, pursuing an additional degree, or working in a non-professional, short-term, or part-time job nine months after graduation. Of the 160 graduates of the Class of 2022, 84.4% had some full time job, and 77.5% had a full-time job requiring a JD.

Howard Law placed 45th on the 2014 National Law Journal "Top 50 Go-To" list, climbed to No. 22 on the 2015 list, fell to 37th for the 2016 list, and climbed back to 32nd for the 2017 list. The list ranks the top 50 schools by the percentage of JDs who accept first-year associate positions at the 100 largest firms.

== Costs ==
The cost of tuition and fees at Howard Law for the 2022-2023 academic year is $37,160, and estimated cost of attendance is $68,620 when estimated living expenses are included. The $68,620 total cost of attendance at Howard Law is lower than some schools in the D.C. area — for example George Washington University Law School's total cost of attendance was $100,000 for the 2023-2024 academic year — but higher than others, such as the University of the District of Columbia's David A. Clarke School of Law where the total cost of attendance for D.C. residents for the 2023-2024 school year was $45,731 (and $58,665 for non-residents).

The Law School Transparency estimated debt-financed cost of attendance for three years is $248,300 as of 2022.

== Rankings ==
U.S. News & World Report ranked Howard Law 98th out of 192 schools in its 2023 rankings. Its ranking fell to 125th in the 2024 rankings, as the ranking methodology changed dramatically from the prior year.

== Notable alumni ==
=== Civil rights activism ===
- Louis Berry, civil rights activist in Louisiana
- Mary Ann Shad Cary, first black woman to cast a vote in a national election
- Danielle Conway, first African-American dean of Maine Law School
- Mahala Ashley Dickerson, first African-American elected as president of the National Association of Women Lawyers
- Emma Gillett, co-founder of American University's Washington College of Law and the first woman to be appointed notary public by the president of the United States
- Letitia James, New York State Attorney General and first African American woman to hold citywide office in New York City.
- Edward W. Jacko (1916–1979) American Civil Rights attorney, defended Nation of Islam.
- Pauli Murray, was an American civil rights activist, women's rights activist, lawyer, and author. She was also the first black woman ordained an Episcopal priest.
- Zephyr Moore Ramsey (1893–1984), lawyer based in Southern California
- Charlotte E. Ray, first African American female lawyer
- Dovey Johnson Roundtree, Army officer, civil rights lawyer, and A.M.E. Church minister

=== Judges ===
- Henry Lee Adams Jr., United States District Court Judge
- Loretta Copeland Biggs, United States District Court Judge
- William Bryant, United States District Court Judge
- Robert L. Carter, United States District Court Judge
- Wiley Young Daniel, United States District Court Judge
- James Dean, county judge and first African-American judge in Florida
- Leland DeGrasse, New York Supreme Court (Appellate Division) Judge
- George W. Draper III, Supreme Court of Missouri Judge
- Richard Erwin, United States District Court Judge
- Wilkie D. Ferguson, United States District Court Judge
- William P. Greene, Judge to the United States Court of Appeals for Veteran Claims
- LaShann Moutique DeArcy Hall, United States District Court Judge
- Joseph Woodrow Hatchett, Chief Judge of the United States Court of Appeals for the Eleventh Circuit
- Odell Horton, former United States District Court Judge
- J. Curtis Joyner, United States District Court Judge
- Damon Keith, United States Court of Appeals Judge
- Consuelo Bland Marshall, United States District Court Judge
- Thurgood Marshall, first African American United States Supreme Court Justice and first African American Solicitor General of the United States
- Vicki Miles-LaGrange, United States District Court Judge
- Gabrielle Kirk McDonald, United States District Court Judge and International Criminal Tribunal
- Tanya Walton Pratt, United States District Court Judge
- Scovel Richardson, United States Court of International Trade Judge
- Spottswood William Robinson III, United States Court of Appeals Judge
- William M. Skretny, United States District Court Judge
- Emmet G. Sullivan, United States District Court Judge
- Fiti A. Sunia, Associate Justice of the High Court of American Samoa and former Attorney General of American Samoa
- Anne Elise Thompson, United States District Court Judge
- Joseph Cornelius Waddy, United States District Court Judge
- Alexander Williams Jr., United States District Court Judge
- Carolyn Wright, American lawyer, jurist and the Chief Justice of the Fifth Court of Appeals of Texas
- John Milton Younge, United States District Court Judge

=== Politicians ===
- Aisha N. Braveboy, former Member of Maryland House of Delegates and current Prince George's County State's Attorney
- Roland Burris, former Illinois United States Senator
- Evandro Carvalho, former Representative, Massachusetts House of Representatives
- Kevin P. Chavous, Council of the District of Columbia Representative
- Darcel D. Clark, District Attorney, Bronx County, New York
- James Felder, first Black member of the South Carolina Legislature since Reconstruction
- Adrian Fenty, former mayor of Washington, DC
- Earl Hilliard, United States House of Representatives
- Letitia James, Attorney General of New York
- Sharon Pratt Kelly, former mayor of Washington, DC
- Annie Brown Kennedy, first Black woman to serve in the North Carolina House of Representatives
- Summer Lee, Pennsylvania House of Representatives
- Janeese Lewis George, member of the Council of the District of Columbia
- Henry L. Marsh, former mayor of Richmond, Virginia and Virginia State Senator
- Gregory Meeks, United States House of Representatives
- James E. O'Hara, United States House of Representatives
- Vincent Orange, former Member of the Council of the District of Columbia
- Kasim Reed, former mayor of Atlanta, Georgia
- Hugh Shearer, former prime minister of Jamaica
- Walter Washington, first mayor of Washington, DC
- Togo D. West Jr., former United States Secretary of Veteran Affairs under Bill Clinton.
- L. Douglas Wilder, first African-American United States governor since Reconstruction and former mayor of Richmond, Virginia
- C. T. Wilson, Member, Maryland House of Delegates
- Harris Wofford, United States Senate

=== Other ===
- Denise George, former Attorney General of the United States Virgin Islands
- Prince Joel Dawit Makonnen, Ethiopian prince
- Cheryl L. Johnson, 36th Clerk of the United States House of Representatives
- Vernon Jordan, former president of the National Urban League and Senior Managing Director with Lazard Freres
- Kellis Parker, Columbia Law School professor
- Gladys Tignor Peterson, educator in Washington, D.C.
- Willie L. Phillips, chair of the Federal Energy Regulatory Commission
- Leigh Whipper, actor
