= Debbie Gibson discography =

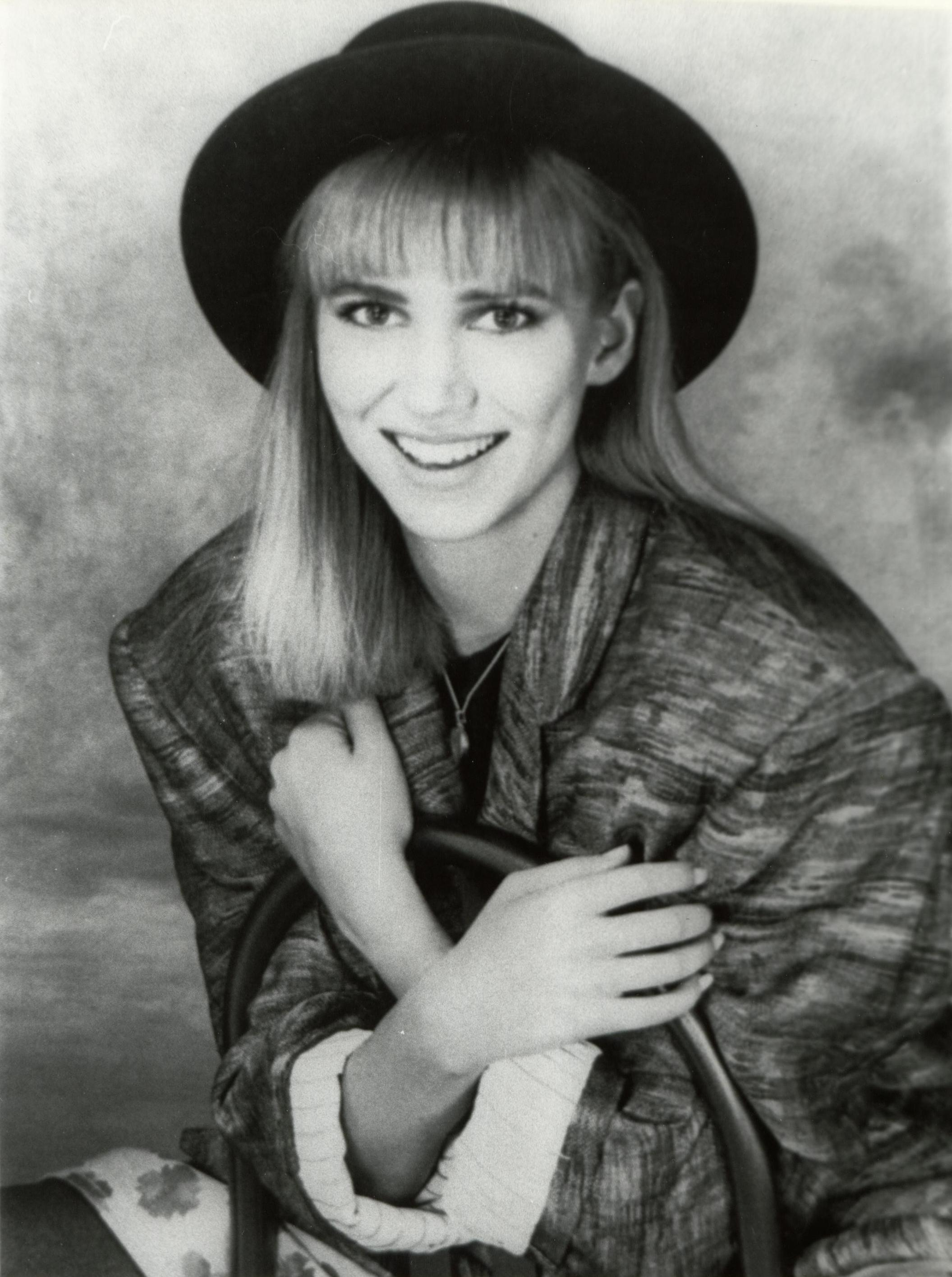
- Studio albums: 10
- Compilation albums: 6
- Singles: 44
- Video albums: 3
- Music videos: 31
- As featured artist: 2
- Box sets: 1

American singer-songwriter Debbie Gibson has released ten studio albums, six compilation albums, one box set, 46 singles (44 as lead artist and two as featured artist), three video albums, and 31 music videos.

== Albums ==
=== Studio albums ===
Year	Title and details	Chart positions								Certifications
Year	Title and details	US	AUS	CAN	JPN	NED	SWE	SWI	UK	Certifications
1987	Out of the Blue: Released: August 18, 1987; Label: Atlantic; Formats: LP, CD, cassette	7	66	22	75	48	34	—	26	RIAA: 3× Platinum; BPI: Gold
1989	Electric Youth: Released: January 24, 1989; Label: Atlantic; Formats: LP, CD, cassette	1	10	11	15	—	43	21	8	RIAA: 2× Platinum; AUS: Platinum; RIAJ: Platinum; BPI: Gold
1990	Anything Is Possible: Released: November 20, 1990; Label: Atlantic; Formats: LP, CD, cassette	41	80	85	5	—	—	—	69	RIAA: Gold; RIAJ: Gold
1993	Body, Mind, Soul: Released: January 19, 1993; Label: Atlantic; Formats: CD, cassette	109	180	—	13	—	—	—	—	
1995	Think with Your Heart: Released: July 3, 1995; Label: SBK, EMI; Formats: CD, cassette	—	—	—	46	—	—	—	—	
1997	Deborah: Released: June 11, 1997; Label: Espiritu; Formats: CD	—	—	—	—	—	—	—	—	
2001	M.Y.O.B.: Released: March 6, 2001; Label: Golden Egg; Formats: CD	—	—	—	—	—	—	—	—	
2003	Colored Lights: The Broadway Album: Released: October 28, 2003; Label: Fynsworth Alley; Formats: CD	—	—	—	—	—	—	—	—	
2010	Ms. Vocalist: Released: November 3, 2010; Label: Sony (Japan); Formats: CD, CD + DVD	—	—	—	71	—	—	—	—	
2021	The Body Remembers: Released: August 20, 2021; Label: Stargirl; Formats: CD, digital, streaming, LP	— (Note: The Body Remembers did not enter the US Billboard 200, but did peak at number 86 on the Top Album Sales chart.)	—	—	—	—	—	—	—	

=== Christmas albums ===
Title	Album details
Winterlicious	Released: October 21, 2022; Label: Stargirl; Formats: CD, digital, streaming, LP

=== Compilations ===
Title and details	Chart positions	
Title and details	US	JPN
Greatest Hits: Released: September 1, 1995; Label: Atlantic; Formats: Cassette, CD	— (Note: "Greatest Hits" did not enter the Billboard 200, but did peak at number 92 on the Cash Box Chart)	63
Lost in Your Eyes and Other Hits: Released: October 1999; Label: Flashback; Formats: CD	—	—
Memory Lane, Volume 1: Released: January 2005; Label: Golden Egg; Formats: CD	—	—
Memory Lane, Volume 2: Released: October 2005; Label: Golden Egg; Formats: CD	—	—
Rhino Hi-Five: Debbie Gibson: Released: 2006; Label: Rhino; Formats: Digital	—	—
The Singles A's & B's: Released: 2017; Label: Wounded Bird; Formats: CD	—	—

=== Box sets ===
Title and details
We Could Be Together
- Released: October 20, 2017
- Label: Edsel
- Formats: CDs, DVDs

=== Remix albums ===
Title and details
The Remixes
- Released: April 17, 2024
- Label: Stargirl
- Formats: LP

=== Soundtracks ===
Title and details	Chart positions	Certifications
Title and details	UK	Certifications
Grease London Cast Recording: Released: 1993; Label: Epic; Formats: LP, CD, Cassette	20	BPI: Gold

== Singles ==
=== As lead artist ===
List of singles, with selected chart positions
Year	Title	Peak chart positions										Certifications	Album
Year	Title	US	US AC	US Dance	AUS	CAN	IRE	JPN	NED	SWI	UK	Certifications	Album
1987	"Only in My Dreams"	4	31	12	—	6	20	—	46	—	11	RIAA: Gold	Out of the Blue
1987	"Shake Your Love"	4	—	6	27	15	3	—	35	19	7	RIAA: Gold	Out of the Blue
1988	"Out of the Blue"	3	16	44	68	15	19	—	88	—	19		Out of the Blue
1988	"Foolish Beat"	1	8	—	60	2	5	—	7	10	9		Out of the Blue
1988	"Staying Together"	22	—	—	—	27	15	—	—	—	53		Out of the Blue
1988	"Red Hot"^{1}	—	—	—	—	—	—	—	—	—	—		Out of the Blue
1989	"Lost in Your Eyes"	1	3	—	7	1	18	—	45	—	34	RIAA: Gold; ARIA: Gold	Electric Youth
1989	"Electric Youth"	11	—	3	21	15	13	—	35	—	14	RIAA: Gold	Electric Youth
1989	"No More Rhyme"	17	13	—	58	25	—	—	—	—	—		Electric Youth
1989	"We Could Be Together"	71	—	—	57	—	23	—	—	—	22		Electric Youth
1990	"Without You"^{2}	—	—	—	—	—	—	26	—	—	—	RIAJ: Gold	Non-album single
1990	"Anything Is Possible"	26	48	—	60	17	—	—	—	—	51		Anything Is Possible
1991	"This So-Called Miracle"	—	—	—	—	—	—	—	—	—	—		Anything Is Possible
1991	"One Hand, One Heart"	— (Note: Although One Hand, One Heart did not enter the US Billboard 100 or the Cash Box Top 100 singles in the U.S., it did peak at number 5 on the Cash Box 'Looking Ahead' Chart – essentially #105)	—	—	—	—	—	—	—	—	—		Anything Is Possible
1991	"One Step Ahead"	—	—	18	—	—	—	—	—	—	80		Anything Is Possible
1991	"Sure"^{1}	—	—	—	—	—	—	—	—	—	—		Anything Is Possible
1992	"In His Mind"^{2}	—	—	—	—	—	—	90	—	—	—		Anything Is Possible
1993	"Losin' Myself"	86	49	46	126	73	—	—	—	—	—		Body Mind Soul
1993	"Eyes of the Child"^{2}	—	—	—	—	—	—	—	—	—	—		Non-album single
1993	"Shock Your Mama"	—	—	—	139	—	—	—	—	—	74		Body Mind Soul
1993	"How Can This Be?"^{2}	—	—	—	—	—	—	—	—	—	—		Body Mind Soul
1993	"Free Me"^{2,} ^{3}	—	—	—	—	—	—	—	—	—	—		Body Mind Soul
1993	"You're the One That I Want" ^{4} (with Craig McLachlan)	—	—	—	—	—	24	—	—	—	13		Grease – The Original London Cast Recording
1995	"For Better or Worse"^{2,} ^{3}	—	—	—	—	—	—	—	—	—	—		Think with Your Heart
1995	"Didn't Have the Heart"^{3}	—	—	—	—	—	—	—	—	—	—		Think with Your Heart
1997	"Only Words"	—	—	38	—	—	—	—	—	—	—		Deborah
1997	"Moonchild"^{2}	—	—	—	—	—	—	—	—	—	—		Deborah
1998	"Only in My Dreams 1998"	—	—	—	—	—	—	—	—	—	—		Deborah
2000	"What You Want"	—	—	—	—	—	—	—	—	—	—		M.Y.O.B.
2001	"Your Secret"	—	—	— (Note: Although Your Secret did not enter the US Billboard Dance Club Songs chart, it did peak at number 2 on the Billboard Hot Dance Breakouts Chart.)	—	—	—	—	—	—	—		M.Y.O.B.
2005	"Naked"	—	—	—	—	—	—	—	—	—	—		Non-album singles
2009	"Already Gone"	—	—	—	—	—	—	—	—	—	—		Non-album singles
2010	"I Love You"	—	—	—	—	—	—	—	—	—	—		Ms. Vocalist
2018	"Your Forever Girl"	—	—	—	—	—	—	—	—	—	—		Non-album singles
2018	"Boys in the Band" (with NKOTB)	—	—	—	—	—	—	—	—	—	—		Non-album singles
2018	"80s Baby" (with NKOTB)	—	—	—	—	—	—	—	—	—	—		Non-album singles
2020	"Girls Night Out" (Tracy Young Remix)	—	—	4	—	—	—	—	—	—	—		The Body Remembers
2021	"Lost in Your Eyes, the Duet" (with Joey McIntyre)	—	—	—	—	—	—	—	—	—	—		The Body Remembers
2021	"One Step Closer"	—	—	—	—	—	—	—	—	—	—		The Body Remembers
2021	"Christmas Star"	—	—	—	—	—	—	—	—	—	—		Winterlicious
2022	"Me Not Loving You"	—	—	—	—	—	—	—	—	—	—		The Body Remembers
2022	"Heartbreak Holiday" (with Joey McIntyre)	—	—	—	—	—	—	—	—	—	—		Winterlicious
2023	"Love Don't Care"	—	—	—	—	—	—	—	—	—	—		The Body Remembers
2024	"Electric Youth" (Newstalgia Radio Mix by Tracy Young)	—	—	—	—	—	—	—	—	—	—		The Remixes
2025	"Legendary"	—	—	—	—	—	—	—	—	—	—		The Body Remembers
"—" denotes a title that did not chart, or was not released in that territory.

Notes:

- ^{1} Only released in the Philippines.
- ^{2} Only released in Japan.
- ^{3} Promo single.
- ^{4} Only released in the United Kingdom.

=== As featured artist ===
List of singles, with selected chart positions
Year	Single	Peak positions		Album
Year	Single	US AC	US Dance	Album
2006	"Say Goodbye" (with Jordan Knight)	24	—	Love Songs
2017	"I Am Peaceman" (Sir Ivan featuring Debbie Gibson)	—	26	Non-album single
"—" denotes a title that did not chart, or was not released in that territory.

== Other recordings ==
- 1988 "Super Mix Club", Pioneer Records CD5 #25XD-996 (Japan-only compilation of maxi-single tracks).
- 1990 "Whose World Is It?" (written for, and performed live at, Earth 90: Children and the Environment, a UNICEF benefit telecast), unreleased.
- 1990 "Come Home (Wonder Years)", Atlantic Soundtrack 82032 The Wonder Years: Music from the Emmy Award-Winning Show & Its Era.
- 1990 "In the Still of the Night (I'll Remember)", Atlantic Soundtrack 82032 The Wonder Years: Music from the Emmy Award-Winning Show & Its Era.
- 1991 "A Medley of Rhymes", album track on For Our Children (Walt Disney 6061).
- 1992 "Sleigh Ride", album track on A Very Special Christmas 2 (A&M Records).
- 1993 Grease – The Original London Cast Recording, Epic Records (UK-only).
- 1998 Z – The Masked Musical, Get Z'd Productions LLC.
- 1999 "Light the World" (Duet with Peabo Bryson), Unconditional Love (Windham Hill #01005-82169).
- 2000 "You Belong to Me", a website-only download.
- 2003 "Portrait in Loneliness", compilation album track, Universal Japan (Japan only).
- 2006 "Someone You Love", O'Neill Brothers – Someone You Love (private label).
- 2006 "Lost in Your Eyes" (acoustic version), O'Neill Brothers – Someone You Love (private label).
- 2006 "Say Goodbye" (Duet with Jordan Knight), Jordan Knight – Love Songs, (Billboard Adult Contemporary Chart #24)
- 2017 "I Am Peaceman" (Duet with Sir Ivan) (Billboard Dance Club Chart #26)

== Other artists ==
- 1987 "Speed of Light", Reimy, A&M SP 12268 (Composer).
- 1989 "Lost Love" and "Yume dake ja Kanashī: Another Saturday Night", Fuyuko Kurihara, Warner Pioneer 09L3-4065 (Composer).
- 1990 "Ton of Bricks", The Party, Hollywood 60980 (Composer).
- 1990 "Everytime We Say Goodbye", "Friendly", Ana – Body Language, Parc/Epic ZK 45355 (Composer, Producer, Arranger, keyboards, backing vocals).
- 1991 "Voices That Care", all-star single, Giant 19350 (Choir).
- 1991 Five songs for Jo Beth Taylor, Melodian Records (Australia/New Zealand only) (Composer, Producer/Co-Producer, programming and sequencing, backing vocals).
- 1991 "Hip Hop", Chris Cuevas – Somehow, Someway, Atlantic LP 82187 (Co-composer, for help on the vocals).
- 1991 "Someday", Chris Cuevas – Somehow, Someway, Atlantic LP 82187 (Co-lead vocal).
- 1992 "Bedtime Stories", Jennifer Love Hewitt – Love Songs, Meldac (Co-writer, backing vocals).
- 1995 "I Wanna Destroy You", Circle Jerks – Oddities, Abnormalities and Curiosities, Mercury/PolyGram 314 526 948 (backing vocals).
- 2002 "Fever", w-inds. – The System of Alive, Pony Canyon FPCCA-01824 (Japan only) (Co-Composer).
- 2006 "Say Goodbye", Jordan Knight – Love Songs, Trans Continental TC-1-003 (Co-lead vocal).

== Videography ==
=== Music videos ===
Year	Video	Director	Notes
1987	"Only in My Dreams"	Simeon Soffer	Single Version Used
1987	"Shake Your Love"	Jay Brown	Single Version Used
1988	"Out of the Blue"	Nick Willing	Album Version Used
1988	"Foolish Beat"	Nick Willing	Album Version Used
1988	"Staying Together"	Jim Yukich	Extended Version Used
1989	"Lost in Your Eyes"	Jim Yukich	Extended Version Used
1989	"Electric Youth"	Jim Yukich	Extended Version Used
1989	"No More Rhyme"	Jim Yukich	Extended Version Used
1989	"We Could Be Together"	Jim Yukich & Deborah Gibson	Extended Version Used
1990	"Anything Is Possible"	Jay Brown	Album Version Used
1991	"This So-Called Miracle"	Jim Yukich	Single Version Used
1991	"One Hand, One Heart"		Single Version Used
1992	"Someday" (with Chris Cuevas)	Jim Yukich	Single Version Used
1993	"Losin' Myself"	Matthew Rolston	Single Version Used
1993	"Shock Your Mama"	Lydie Callier	Album Version Used
1993	"You're the One That I Want" (with Craig McLachlan)		Single Version Used
1995	"For Better or Worse"	Jim Yukich	Album Version Used
1995	"Didn't Have the Heart"		Single Version Used
1997	"Only Words"		Single Version Used
1997	"Only Words" (Remix video)		Dance Mix Used
2000	"What You Want"		Album Version Used
2009	"Already Gone"		Single Version Used
2010	"I Love You"		Single Version Used
2012	"Electric Youth Reloaded"		Single Version Used
2017	"I Am Peaceman"		Single Version Used
2018	"Your Forever Girl"		Single Version Used
2020	"Girls Night Out"	John Asher	Vegas Vibe Mix Version Used
2021	"Lost in Your Eyes, the Duet" (with Joey McIntyre)	Patrick Anthony	Single Version Used
2021	"One Step Closer"	Nick Spanos	Single Version Used
2022	"Me Not Loving You"	Nick Spanos	Single Version Used
2023	"Love Don't Care"	Nick Spanos / Debbie Gibson	Single Version Used

=== Video albums ===
List of media, with selected chart positions
Title	Album details	Chart	Certifications
Title	Album details	US	Certifications
Out of the Blue	Released: 1988; Label: Atlantic; Formats: VHS, LD	4	RIAA: Platinum
Live in Concert: The "Out of the Blue" Tour	Released: 1989; Label: Atlantic; Formats: VHS, LD	3	RIAA: Platinum
Live Around the World	Released: 1990; Label: A*Vision; Formats: VHS, LD	11	RIAA: Platinum
