= We Could Be Together (album) =

Box set by Debbie Gibson
- Released: October 20, 2017
- Recorded: 1986–2016
- Genres: Pop; bubblegum pop; dance-pop; pop rock; soul; freestyle; adult contemporary; musicals; standards
- Label: Edsel

Debbie Gibson chronology
The Singles A's & B's (2017)	We Could Be Together (2017)	The Body Remembers (2021)

We Could Be Together is a career-spanning box set by American singer-songwriter Debbie Gibson. Named after Gibson's 1989 single of the same name, it was released on October 20, 2017 by Edsel Records, celebrating her 30th anniversary in the music industry. The 12" x 12" box set consists of eight of her studio albums appended with bonus tracks (excluding her 2003 covers album Colored Lights: The Broadway Album), a remix album, and a bonus album of rare tracks, plus three DVDs and a 32-page coffee table book. An Amazon exclusive release included a signed 12" x 12" frameable print and was limited to 750 copies.

The box set was named "Best Reissue" on Pop Dose's Best of 2017: 10 Albums for the Buy Curious.

== Track listing ==
All tracks are written by Deborah Gibson, except where indicated.

CD 1: Out of the Blue (1987)
No.	Title	Length
1.	"Out of the Blue"	3:55
2.	"Staying Together"	4:05
3.	"Only in My Dreams"	3:54
4.	"Foolish Beat"	4:23
5.	"Red Hot"	3:53
6.	"Wake Up to Love"	3:42
7.	"Shake Your Love"	3:44
8.	"Fallen Angel"	4:44
9.	"Play the Field"	4:37
10.	"Between the Lines"	4:42
11.	"Only in My Dreams" (Extended Club Mix)	6:32
12.	"Shake Your Love" (Club Mix)	5:54
13.	"Out of the Blue" (Club Mix)	5:52
14.	"Staying Together" (Remix)	5:57
15.	"Foolish Beat" (Extended Mix)	6:44
16.	"Medley: Out of the Blue/Shake Your Love/Only in My Dreams" (Debbie Gibson Mega Mix)	7:13
Total length:		79:00

CD 2: Electric Youth (1989)
No.	Title	Length
1.	"Who Loves Ya Baby?"	3:59
2.	"Lost in Your Eyes"	3:33
3.	"Love in Disguise"	4:18
4.	"Helplessly in Love"	4:11
5.	"Silence Speaks (a Thousand Words)"	3:38
6.	"Should've Been the One"	5:09
7.	"Electric Youth"	4:56
8.	"No More Rhyme"	4:14
9.	"Over the Wall"	3:58
10.	"We Could Be Together"	5:34
11.	"Shades of the Past"	4:54
12.	"Lost in Your Eyes" (Piano & Vocal Mix)	3:33
13.	"Silence Speaks (a Thousand Words)" (Acoustic Mix)	3:38
14.	"No More Rhyme" (Acoustic Mix)	4:13
15.	"We Could Be Together" (Campfire Mix)	5:34
16.	"Electric Youth" (Latin Edit)	3:53
17.	"Over the Wall" (Dub Version)	4:25
18.	"We Could Be Together" (Remix)	5:36
Total length:		79:23

CD 3: Anything Is Possible (1990)
No.	Title	Writer(s)	Length
1.	"Another Brick Falls"		3:56
2.	"Anything Is Possible"	Gibson; Lamont Dozier	3:44
3.	"Reverse Psychology"	Gibson; Dozier	4:26
4.	"One Step Ahead"	Gibson; Dozier	4:51
5.	"Stand Your Ground"		3:48
6.	"Deep Down"		4:52
7.	"It Must've Been My Boy"	Gibson; Dozier	4:20
8.	"Lead Them Home My Dreams"		5:33
9.	"One Hand, One Heart"		4:36
10.	"Sure"		4:17
11.	"Negative Energy"		3:41
12.	"Mood Swings"		3:53
13.	"Try"		4:07
14.	"In His Mind"		3:33
15.	"Where Have You Been?"		6:08
16.	"This So-Called Miracle"		7:29
17.	"So Close to Forever"	Gibson; Dozier	3:01
18.	"The Most Beautiful Love Song"		3:13
Total length:			79:35

CD 4: Body, Mind, Soul (1993)
No.	Title	Writer(s)	Length
1.	"Love or Money?"	Gibson; Carl Sturken and Evan Rogers	4:06
2.	"Do You Have It in Your Heart"	Gibson; Sturken; Rogers	4:46
3.	"Free Me"	Gibson; Sturken; Rogers	4:25
4.	"Shock Your Mama"	Gibson; Sturken; Rogers	4:05
5.	"Losin' Myself"	Gibson; Sturken; Rogers	5:16
6.	"How Can This Be?"		3:57
7.	"When I Say No"		3:54
8.	"Little Birdie"		4:02
9.	"Kisses 4 One"		3:49
10.	"Tear Down These Walls"		4:17
11.	"Goodbye"	Gibson; Carole Bayer-Sager; Narada Michael Walden	4:47
12.	"Eyes of the Child"		2:20
13.	"Love or Lust"	Gibson; Sturken; Rogers	4:25
14.	"Kisses 4 One" (Percappella)		3:50
15.	"Losin' Myself" (T-Ray's Acoustic Mix)	Gibson; Sturken; Rogers	5:00
16.	"Free Me" (Extended Mix)	Gibson; Sturken; Rogers	7:22
Total length:			70:01

CD 5: Think with Your Heart (1995)
No.	Title	Writer(s)	Length
1.	"For Better or Worse"		3:24
2.	"Didn't Have the Heart"		4:45
3.	"Will You Love Me Tomorrow?"	Gerry Goffin; Carole King	3:25
4.	"Dancin' in My Mind"		3:30
5.	"Dontcha Want Me Now?"		4:18
6.	"Can't Do It Alone"		4:26
7.	"Think with Your Heart"		3:22
8.	"Too Fancy"		2:10
9.	"You Don't Have to See"		3:49
10.	"Two Young Kids"		3:16
11.	"Interlude/Tony's Rehearsal"		0:40
12.	"Let's Run Away"		5:24
13.	"Call Yourself a Lover"		3:09
14.	"You Know Me"		3:48
Total length:			49:33

CD 6: Deborah (1997)
No.	Title	Writer(s)	Length
1.	"Prelude"		0:18
2.	"Ode to a Would Be Lover"		4:09
3.	"Moonchild"	Gibson; Joy Swinea	4:39
4.	"Only Words"		3:22
5.	"Naturally"		3:54
6.	"Nobody's You"		3:44
7.	"Cry Tonight"	Gibson; Swinea	3:25
8.	"Where I Wanna Be"		4:52
9.	"Butterflies Are Free"		3:40
10.	"Give Me Your Love"		4:10
11.	"Just Wasn't Love"		4:06
12.	"I Can't"		4:12
13.	"People"	Jule Styne; Bob Merrill	3:02
14.	"Don't Rain on My Parade"	Styne; Merrill	2:57
15.	"I Will Let You Go"		3:14
16.	"My Girlfriend's Boyfriend"		4:02
17.	"You Belong to Me"		2:45
18.	"Only in My Dreams 1997" (Dance Edit)		4:37
19.	"Only Words" (Dance Edit)		3:54
20.	"My Girlfriend's Boyfriend" (Unplugged)		4:08
Total length:			73:22

CD 7: M.Y.O.B. (2001)
No.	Title	Writer(s)	Length
1.	"M.Y.O.B."	Billy and Bobby Alessi	4:00
2.	"Your Secret"	Gibson; Jerry Sharell	4:08
3.	"What You Want"	Gibson; Rudy Haeusermann	3:42
4.	"Down That Road"	Gibson; Gary Haase	4:49
5.	"The One"	Gibson; Chynna Phillips	4:13
6.	"Wishing You Were Here"	Gibson; Sharell	3:35
7.	"What Part of No"	Gibson; Haase	5:16
8.	"In Blue"		6:05
9.	"Jaded"		4:11
10.	"Knock Three Times" (Duet with Tony Orlando)	L. Russell Brown; Irwin Levine	5:11
11.	"The Last Word"		4:54
12.	"Light the World" (Featuring Peabo Bryson)		5:07
13.	"Comes Right Back" (Campfire Mix)	Gibson; Jamie Hartman; Marc Nelkin	2:52
14.	"M.Y.O.B." (Dance Mix)	Billy and Bobby Alessi	4:22
15.	"Your Secret" (Hot Vocal Radio Mix)	Gibson; Sharell	3:05
Total length:			65:35

CD 8: Ms. Vocalist (2010)
No.	Title	Writer(s)	Original artist	Length
1.	"Tsunami"	Keisuke Kuwata; Kaz Asonuma; Scantana	Southern All Stars	5:14
2.	"Say Yes"	Ryo Asuka; Stephanie Lewis	Chage and Aska	4:43
3.	"I Love You"	Yutaka Ozaki; Leo Imai	Yutaka Ozaki	4:19
4.	"Roman Hikō" ((浪漫飛行; "Romantic Flight"))	Kome Kome Club; Seiji Motoyama	Kome Kome Club	4:52
5.	"Suddenly ~Love Story wa Totsuzen ni~" (Sadenrī ~Rabu Sutōrī wa Totsuzen ni (Suddenly~ラブ・ストーリーは突然に~; "Sudden Love Story"))	Kazumasa Oda; Priscilla Coolidge	Kazumasa Oda	4:49
6.	"True Love"	Fumiya Fujii; Motoyama	Fumiya Fujii	3:38
7.	"Hitomi o Tojite" ((瞳をとじて; "Close My Eyes"))	Ken Hirai; Sierra	Ken Hirai	5:22
8.	"Sakura Zaka" ((桜坂; "Cherry Blossom Slope"))	Masaharu Fukuyama; Joe Inoue	Masaharu Fukuyama	4:51
9.	"However"	Takuro; Imai	Glay	5:26
10.	"Robinson" ((ロビンソン))	Masamune Kusano; Motoyama	Spitz	4:49
11.	"Lost in Your Eyes 2010 (Bonus Track)"			3:48
12.	"Sekaijū no Dare Yori Kitto (Ms. Vocalist Version) (with Eric Martin) (Bonus Track)" ((世界中の誰よりきっと (MSV ver.); "Surely More Than Anyone in the World (MSV ver.)"))	Show Wesugi; Miho Nakayama; Tetsurō Oda; Emi Komazaki	Miho Nakayama & Wands	4:53
13.	"Lost in Your Eyes 2010 (Japanese Version) (Bonus Track)"	Gibson; Inoue		3:48
Total length:				60:40

CD 9: The Remixes
No.	Title	Writer(s)	Length
1.	"Shake Your Love" (Luke Mornay Remix)		5:08
2.	"Electric Youth" (Deep House Mix)		7:34
3.	"We Could Be Together" (House Mix)		7:18
4.	"Anything Is Possible" (12" Remix)	Gibson; Dozier	7:20
5.	"One Step Ahead" (Club Mix)	Gibson; Dozier	7:24
6.	"Losin' Myself" (12" Masters at Work Version)	Gibson; Sturken; Rogers	5:48
7.	"Free Me" (Smoove Free Club Mix)	Gibson; Sturken; Rogers	7:37
8.	"Only Words" (Arena Club Vocal Mix)		6:46
9.	"Only in My Dreams 1998" (Club Mix)		7:32
10.	"Your Secret" (Secret Party Mix)	Gibson; Sharell	7:42
11.	"Electric Youth" (7th Heaven Club Mix)		6:49
Total length:			77:03

CD 10: Stage, Screen & Beyond
No.	Title	Writer(s)	Length
1.	"In the Still of the Night (I'll Remember)"	Fred Parris	3:54
2.	"Come Home" (The Wonder Years)		2:02
3.	"Without You"	Gibson; Tatsuro Yamashita	4:18
4.	"Someday" (with Chris Cuevas)	Chris Cuevas	4:04
5.	"Hopelessly Devoted to You"	John Farrar	2:54
6.	"You're the One That I Want" (with Craig McLachlan)	Farrar	3:02
7.	"With All My Heart"		3:18
8.	"Someone You Love" (with The O'Neill Brothers)	Gibson; Tim O'Neill; Ryan O'Neill	4:23
9.	"Sounds Like Love"		3:05
10.	"Say Goodbye" (with Jordan Knight)	Aaron Accetta; Jeff Timmons; Matt Fechter; Michael Goodman	3:36
11.	"Naked"		4:13
12.	"Already Gone"		3:27
13.	"Rise"	Gibson; Haeusermann	3:34
14.	"Promises"		3:16
15.	"Wonderland" (Cutting Room Floor Mix)		2:15
16.	"Snake Charmer"		3:40
17.	"Famous"		3:35
18.	"RCVR" (with Big Black Delta)	Jonathan Bates	4:06
19.	"Rise" (Revolution Mix)	Gibson; Haeusermann	3:18
20.	"Dance Dance"		3:54
21.	"Cougar" (featuring WalyO fka DP)	Gibson; Haeusermann; Dan Piccochi	3:39
22.	"Pop Circus"		3:16
23.	"Only in My Dreams 2016" (Acoustic Version)		2:55
Total length:			79:55

DVD 1 - The Videos

No.	Title	Writer(s)	Length
1.	"Only in My Dreams"
2.	"Shake Your Love"
3.	"Out of the Blue"
4.	"Foolish Beat"
5.	"Staying Together"
6.	"Lost in Your Eyes"
7.	"Electric Youth"
8.	"No More Rhyme"
9.	"We Could Be Together"
10.	"Anything Is Possible"	Gibson; Dozier
11.	"This So-Called Miracle"
12.	"One Hand, One Heart"
13.	"Someday" (with Chris Cuevas)	Cuevas
14.	"Losin' Myself"	Gibson; Sturken; Rogers
15.	"Shock Your Mama"	Gibson; Sturken; Rogers
16.	"You're the One That I Want" (with Craig McLachlan)	Farrar
17.	"For Better or Worse"
18.	"Didn't Have the Heart"
19.	"Only Words"
20.	"What You Want"	Gibson; Haeusermann
21.	"Already Gone"
22.	"I Love You"	Ozaki
23.	"Shake Your Love" (12" version)
24.	"Out of the Blue" (12" Version)
25.	"Electric Youth" (Long Version)
26.	"We Could Be Together" (Long Version)
27.	"Anything Is Possible" (UK Version)	Gibson; Dozier
28.	"Only Words" (Dance Version)
29.	"Electric Youth Reloaded" (with Jace Hall)

DVD 2

Live in Pittsburgh: The Out of the Blue Tour (A. J. Palumbo Center, 1988)
No.	Title	Writer(s)	Length
1.	"Staying Together"
2.	"Foolish Beat"
3.	"Shake Your Love"
4.	"In the Still of the Night (I'll Remember)"	Parris
5.	"Lost in Your Eyes"
6.	"Should've Been the One"
7.	"Out of the Blue"
8.	"Only in My Dreams"
9.	"We Could Be Together"
10.	"Crocodile Rock"	Bernie Taupin; Elton John

Live in Atlanta: The Electric Youth Tour (Omni Coliseum, 1989)
No.	Title	Writer(s)	Length
1.	"Who Loves Ya Baby?"
2.	"Over the Wall"
3.	"Lost in Your Eyes"
4.	"Don't Flirt with Me"
5.	"Dance to the Music"	Sly Stone
6.	"Love Under My Pillow"
7.	"Should've Been the One"
8.	"We Could Be Together"
9.	"No More Rhyme"
10.	"Electric Youth"

DVD 3

Live In Tokyo: The Possibilities World Tour (Nippon Budokan, 1991)
No.	Title	Writer(s)	Length
1.	"One Step Ahead"	Gibson; Dozier
2.	"Another Brick Falls"
3.	"Shake Your Love / Out of the Blue"
4.	"Electric Youth"
5.	"Only in My Dreams"
6.	"One Hand, One Heart"
7.	"Without You"	Gibson; Yamashita
8.	"Stand Your Ground"
9.	"Reverse Psychology"	Gibson; Dozier
10.	"Foolish Beat"
11.	"Motown Medley: Heat Wave / I Hear a Symphony / It's the Same Old Song / Invisible / How Sweet It Is (To Be Loved by You) / Heaven Must Have Sent You / I'll Be There"	Holland–Dozier–Holland; Iva Davies; Berry Gordy; Bob West; Willie Hutch; Hal Davis
12.	"It Must've Been My Boy"	Gibson; Dozier
13.	"Anything Is Possible"	Gibson; Dozier
14.	"We Could Be Together"
15.	"Lost in Your Eyes"
16.	"This So-Called Miracle"

Live in Nashville: Tin Pan South (1995)
No.	Title	Writer(s)	Length
1.	"For Better or Worse"
2.	"Didn't Have the Heart"
3.	"Your Love Amazes Me"	Amanda Hunt-Taylor; Chuck Jones
4.	"Too Fancy"
5.	"Lost in Your Eyes"
6.	"Let's Run Away"
7.	"Will You Love Me Tomorrow?"	Goffin; King
