= Greatest Hits (Debbie Gibson album) =

Greatest hits album by Debbie Gibson
- Released: September 1, 1995
- Recorded: 1987–1994
- Length: 54:35
- Label: Atlantic
- Producers: Deborah Gibson; Fred Zarr; Lamont Dozier; Carl Sturken and Evan Rogers

Debbie Gibson chronology
| Think with Your Heart (1995) | Greatest Hits (1995) | Deborah (1997) |

Professional ratings
Review scores
| Source | Rating |
|---|---|
| Allmusic | 4.5/5 stars |

Greatest Hits is the first greatest hits album by American singer-songwriter Debbie Gibson. Released on September 1, 1995, the album compiles her Atlantic Records singles from 1987 to 1993.

As of December 1996, the album has sold more than 30,000 units.

== Track listing ==
All tracks are written by Deborah Gibson, except where indicated.

CD
| No. | Title | Writer(s) | Original album | Length |
|---|---|---|---|---|
| 1. | "Only in My Dreams" (LP Version) | | Out of the Blue (1987) | 3:55 |
| 2. | "Electric Youth" | | Electric Youth (1989) | 4:55 |
| 3. | "Foolish Beat" | | Out of the Blue | 4:25 |
| 4. | "Anything Is Possible" | Gibson; Lamont Dozier | Anything Is Possible (1990) | 3:44 |
| 5. | "Staying Together" | | Out of the Blue | 4:07 |
| 6. | "Lost in Your Eyes" | | Electric Youth | 3:34 |
| 7. | "Shake Your Love" | | Out of the Blue | 3:44 |
| 8. | "No More Rhyme" | | Electric Youth | 4:13 |
| 9. | "Out of the Blue" | | Out of the Blue | 3:55 |
| 10. | "Only in My Dreams" (Extended Club Mix) | | "Only in My Dreams" 12" single (1986) | 5:50 |
| 11. | "Shake Your Love" (Vocal/Club Mix) | | "Shake Your Love" 12" single (1987) | 5:56 |
| 12. | "Losin' Myself" (12" Masters at Work Version) | Gibson; Carl Sturken and Evan Rogers | Body, Mind, Soul (1993) | 5:47 |
| Total length: | | | | 54:35 |

Japan bonus tracks
| No. | Title | Writer(s) | Original album | Length |
|---|---|---|---|---|
| 13. | "Without You" | Gibson; Tatsuro Yamashita | Non-album single (1990) | 4:20 |
| 14. | "Eyes of the Child" | | Non-album single (1993) | 2:21 |

== Charts ==
| Year | Chart | Position |
|---|---|---|
| 1995 | US Cash Box Top 200 | 92 |
| 1995 | Japanese Albums (Oricon) | 63 |
