= Atlantic Records 40th anniversary =

1988 celebration held at Madison Square Garden in New York City

On May 14, 1988, the Atlantic Records label held its 40th-anniversary celebration by staging, at Madison Square Garden, New York, a non-stop concert lasting almost 13 hours starting at noon and ending just shortly before 1 am the following morning. The event was dubbed "It's Only Rock And Roll".

Only artists who had released material on the Atlantic label in the United States performed, spanning the company's forty-year existence. Lavern Baker and Ruth Brown were the longest tenured Atlantic acts to perform, while Debbie Gibson was the most recent.

Some Atlantic signings, who had either officially split up or not performed together for a number of years, re-formed especially to perform. These included The Rascals, Iron Butterfly, and the former members of Led Zeppelin. Other notable performers included Yes, Genesis, Crosby, Stills & Nash, Keith Emerson and Carl Palmer (representing Emerson, Lake & Palmer), Foreigner, Paul Rodgers, Bob Geldof, Booker T. Jones, Wilson Pickett, The Coasters, The Spinners, Phil Collins, Peabo Bryson, The Blues Brothers (featuring Dan Aykroyd and Sam Moore), Roberta Flack, The Manhattan Transfer, Bee Gees, Ben E. King, and Vanilla Fudge.

Plans to close the performance with a greatest hits all-star jam were shelved. Instead, the former members of Led Zeppelin were the last act. "No rehearsal and just shambling on," recalled guitarist Jimmy Page.

The concert was broadcast live in the US on FM radio and HBO television; commentary for the latter being provided backstage by comedian Robert Townsend. HBO commenced its live broadcast a few hours into the event and interspersed footage of the concert that had been taped earlier by the network. In so doing, some of the artists' sets were edited or omitted. An edited version aired later that year on ABC hosted by Robert Hays. The audio was recorded by David Hewitt and Stanley Johnston on the Record Plant Black Truck.

Banners heralding the reunion of Led Zeppelin were displayed like tapestry by excited fans – but, to the fans' dismay, were taken down before HBO went with their live feed.

In the United Kingdom, the event was broadcast over four weeks by BBC Two, presented as hour-long episodes. Atlantic issued this production on video as Atlantic Records 40th Anniversary: It's Only Rock 'n' Roll. The release intercut concert footage with highlights of earlier performances, and older footage from the Atlantic archives.

== Performances ==
Marv Albert

- Introduction

The Coasters

- "That Is Rock-N-Roll"
- "Charlie Brown"

Phil Collins

- "In the Air Tonight"

Phil Collins

- Introduction of LaVern Baker

Lavern Baker

- "Jim Dandy"
- "Saved"

Roberta Flack

- Introduction of Foreigner

Foreigner

- "Hot Blooded"
- "Juke Box Hero"
- "Urgent"
- "I Want To Know What Love Is"

Iron Butterfly

- "In-A-Gadda-Da-Vida"

Laura Branigan

- "Gloria"

Stephen Stills

- Introduction of Ben E. King

Ben E. King

- "Spanish Harlem"
- "There Goes My Baby"
- "Save the Last Dance for Me"

Roberta Flack

- "Killing Me Softly with His Song"

Roberta Flack and Peabo Bryson

- "The Closer I Get to You"

Michael Douglas

- Introduction of Crosby, Stills & Nash

Crosby, Stills & Nash

- "Wooden Ships"
- "Our House"
- "Suite: Judy Blue Eyes"

Bee Gees

- "To Love Somebody"
- "Lonely Days"
- "Jive Talkin'"

3 (as Emerson & Palmer with Robert Berry on bass)

- "America (including Rondo, Tocata, Tank)"

Yes

- "I've Seen All Good People"
- "Hold On"
- "Owner of a Lonely Heart"
- "Perpetual Change"
- "Roundabout"

Dan Aykroyd and Bill Murray

- Introduction of The Rascals

The Rascals

- "Good Lovin'"
- "Groovin'"
- "People Got to Be Free"

Vanilla Fudge

- "You Keep Me Hangin' On"
- "Take Me for a Little While"

Average White Band

- "Pick Up the Pieces"

Ruth Brown

- "Teardrops from My Eyes"
- "(Mama) He Treats Your Daughter Mean"

Lisa Bonet

- Introduction of Debbie Gibson

Debbie Gibson

- "Staying Together"
- "Foolish Beat"
- medley
  - "Out of the Blue"
  - "Shake Your Love"
  - "Only in My Dreams"
- "Happy Birthday to You"

Phil Collins

- Introduction of Robert Plant

Robert Plant

- "Heaven Knows"
- "Ship of Fools"
- "Tall Cool One"

Alan Paul & Tim Hauser of The Manhattan Transfer

- "Mack the Knife"

The Manhattan Transfer

- "Birdland"

The Spinners

- "Mighty Love"
- "Could It Be I'm Falling in Love"
- "Working My Way Back to You"

Dan Aykroyd

- Introduction of Steve Cropper and Duck Dunn

The MG's

- "Last Night"

Steve Cropper

- Introduction of Carla Thomas

Carla Thomas and the MG's

- "Gee Whiz"

Steve Cropper

- Introduction of Paul Rodgers

Paul Rodgers and the MG's

- "(Sittin' On) The Dock of the Bay"

Steve Cropper

- Introduction of Miki Howard

Miki Howard and the MG's

- "Try a Little Tenderness"

Carla Thomas, Paul Shaffer and the MG's

- "Tramp"

Dan Aykroyd (as Elwood Blues), Sam Moore and the MG's

- "Everybody Needs Somebody to Love"
- "Soul Man"
- "I've Been Loving You Too Long"

Dan Aykroyd (as Elwood Blues), Sam Moore, Phil Collins, and the MG's

- "You Don't Know Like I Know"
- "Knock on Wood"

Roberta Flack

- Introduction of Bob Geldof

Bob Geldof

- "You Can't Be Too Strong"

Wilson Pickett and the MG's

- "In the Midnight Hour"

Wilson Pickett, Dan Aykroyd (as Elwood Blues) and the MG's

- "Land of a Thousand Dances"

Mike Green

- Presentation to Ahmet Ertegun

Ahmet Ertegun

- Introduction of Genesis

Genesis

- medley
  - "Turn It On Again"
  - "Land of Confusion"
  - "Misunderstanding"
  - "Throwing It All Away"
  - "You Can't Hurry Love"
  - "Shortcut to Somewhere"
  - "All I Need Is a Miracle"
  - "That's All"
  - "Tonight, Tonight, Tonight"
  - "Invisible Touch"
  - "Turn It On Again (Reprise)"

Paul Shaffer

- Introduction of Rufus Thomas

Rufus Thomas

- "Walking the Dog"

Robert Townsend, Phil Collins, and Ahmet Ertegun

- Introduction of Led Zeppelin

Led Zeppelin (John Paul Jones, Jimmy Page and Robert Plant) with Jason Bonham on drums

- "Kashmir"
- "Heartbreaker"
- "Whole Lotta Love"
- "Misty Mountain Hop"
- "Stairway to Heaven"
