= List of Billboard Hot 100 top-ten singles in 1988 =

This is a list of singles that have peaked in the top 10 of the Billboard Hot 100 during 1988.

122 songs were in the top ten in 1988, only 113 of them peaked in 1988 (the other nine peaked in either 1987 or 1989). 33 singles hit number one that year, tying with 1989 with the second most number one songs in a year. Eleven songs reached a peak of number two that year. George Michael scored five top ten hits during the year with "Faith", "Father Figure", "One More Try", "Monkey", and "Kissing a Fool", the most among all other artists.

== Top-ten singles ==
- (#) – 1988 Year-end top 10 single position and rank ("Heaven Is a Place on Earth" by Belinda Carlisle reached #7 on the Year-end Hot 100 single chart of 1988.)

List of Billboard Hot 100 top ten singles which peaked in 1988
Top ten entry date	Single	Artist(s)	Peak	Peak date	Weeks in top ten
Singles from 1987
December 5	"So Emotional" (#6)	Whitney Houston	1	January 9	8
December 12	"Got My Mind Set on You" (#3)	George Harrison	1	January 16	8
December 26	"The Way You Make Me Feel"	Michael Jackson	1	January 23	6
December 26	"Cherry Bomb"	John Cougar Mellencamp	8	January 9	3
December 26	"Need You Tonight" (#2)	INXS	1	January 30	8
Singles from 1988
January 9	"Tell It to My Heart"	Taylor Dayne	7	January 23	4
January 16	"Could've Been" (#8)	Tiffany	1	February 6	6
January 16	"Hazy Shade of Winter"	The Bangles	2	February 6	5
January 16	"Candle in the Wind"	Elton John	6	January 23	3
January 23	"Seasons Change"	Exposé	1	February 20	6
January 23	"I Want to Be Your Man"	Roger	3	February 13	5
January 30	"Hungry Eyes"	Eric Carmen	4	February 13	5
February 6	"What Have I Done to Deserve This?"	Pet Shop Boys with Dusty Springfield	2	February 20	5
February 6	"Say You Will"	Foreigner	6	February 20	4
February 6	"Tunnel of Love"	Bruce Springsteen	9	February 6	1
February 6	"I Could Never Take the Place of Your Man"	Prince	10	February 6	1
February 13	"Don't Shed a Tear"	Paul Carrack	9	February 13	3
February 13	"She's Like the Wind"	Patrick Swayze featuring Wendy Fraser	3	February 27	6
February 20	"Father Figure"	George Michael	1	February 27	6
February 20	"Never Gonna Give You Up" (#4)	Rick Astley	1	March 12	7
February 27	"I Get Weak"	Belinda Carlisle	2	March 19	5
February 27	"Can't Stay Away from You"	Gloria Estefan and Miami Sound Machine	6	March 5	3
March 5	"Just Like Paradise"	David Lee Roth	6	March 12	3
March 5	"Endless Summer Nights"	Richard Marx	2	March 26	6
March 5	"Man in the Mirror"	Michael Jackson	1	March 26	7
March 5	"I Found Someone"	Cher	10	March 5	1
March 12	"Out of the Blue"	Debbie Gibson	3	April 9	5
March 12	"I Want Her"	Keith Sweat	5	April 2	5
March 19	"Get Outta My Dreams, Get into My Car"	Billy Ocean	1	April 9	7
March 26	"Rocket 2 U"	The Jets	6	April 2	4
March 26	"Hysteria"	Def Leppard	10	March 26	1
April 2	"Devil Inside"	INXS	2	April 16	5
April 2	"Girlfriend"	Pebbles	5	April 23	5
April 2	"Where Do Broken Hearts Go"	Whitney Houston	1	April 23	6
April 9	"Wishing Well"	Terence Trent D'Arby	1	May 7	6
April 16	"Angel"	Aerosmith	3	April 30	5
April 16	"I Saw Him Standing There"	Tiffany	7	April 23	3
April 16	"Some Kind of Lover"	Jody Watley	10	April 16	1
April 23	"Anything for You"	Gloria Estefan and Miami Sound Machine	1	May 14	7
April 23	"Pink Cadillac"	Natalie Cole	5	May 7	4
April 23	"Prove Your Love"	Taylor Dayne	7	May 7	3
May 7	"Always on My Mind"	Pet Shop Boys	4	May 21	4
May 7	"Shattered Dreams"	Johnny Hates Jazz	2	May 14	6
May 7	"Electric Blue"	Icehouse	7	May 21	3
May 7	"Naughty Girls (Need Love Too)"	Samantha Fox	3	June 4	6
May 14	"One More Try"	George Michael	1	May 28	7
May 14	"I Don't Want to Live Without You"	Foreigner	5	May 28	4
May 21	"Wait"	White Lion	8	May 21	2
May 21	"Everything Your Heart Desires"	Hall & Oates	3	June 11	5
May 21	"Two Occasions"	The Deele	10	May 21	1
May 28	"Together Forever"	Rick Astley	1	June 18	6
May 28	"Piano in the Dark"	Brenda Russell	6	June 4	2
June 4	"Foolish Beat"	Debbie Gibson	1	June 25	6
June 4	"Make It Real"	The Jets	4	June 25	5
June 11	"Dirty Diana"	Michael Jackson	1	July 2	5
June 11	"Circle in the Sand"	Belinda Carlisle	7	June 18	2
June 11	"The Valley Road"	Bruce Hornsby and the Range	5	July 2	5
June 18	"The Flame"	Cheap Trick	1	July 9	6
June 18	"Alphabet St."	Prince	8	June 25	2
June 25	"Mercedes Boy"	Pebbles	2	July 9	5
June 25	"Pour Some Sugar on Me"	Def Leppard	2	July 23	7
July 2	"Nothin' but a Good Time"	Poison	6	July 9	3
July 2	"New Sensation"	INXS	3	July 23	5
July 9	"Hold on to the Nights"	Richard Marx	1	July 23	6
July 9	"Nite and Day"	Al B. Sure!	7	July 16	2
July 16	"Roll with It" (#10)	Steve Winwood	1	July 30	7
July 16	"Hands to Heaven" (#9)	Breathe	2	August 6	6
July 16	"Make Me Lose Control"	Eric Carmen	3	August 13	6
July 23	"Sign Your Name"	Terence Trent D'Arby	4	August 13	5
July 23	"Rush Hour"	Jane Wiedlin	9	July 30	2
July 30	"1-2-3"	Gloria Estefan and Miami Sound Machine	3	August 20	5
July 30	"I Don't Wanna Go on with You Like That"	Elton John	2	August 27	6
August 6	"I Don't Wanna Live Without Your Love"	Chicago	3	August 27	5
August 6	"Monkey"	George Michael	1	August 27	6
August 13	"Just Got Paid"	Johnny Kemp	10	August 13	1
August 20	"Sweet Child o' Mine" (#5)	Guns N' Roses	1	September 10	7
August 20	"Fast Car"	Tracy Chapman	6	August 27	4
August 27	"Simply Irresistible"	Robert Palmer	2	September 10	6
August 27	"Perfect World"	Huey Lewis and the News	3	September 10	5
August 27	"Love Will Save the Day"	Whitney Houston	9	August 27	1
September 3	"When It's Love"	Van Halen	5	September 10	3
September 3	"If It Isn't Love"	New Edition	7	September 17	4
September 3	"I'll Always Love You"	Taylor Dayne	3	September 24	6
September 10	"Don't Worry, Be Happy"	Bobby McFerrin	1	September 24	6
September 10	"Nobody's Fool"	Kenny Loggins	8	September 17	3
September 17	"Love Bites"	Def Leppard	1	October 8	6
September 17	"It Would Take a Strong Strong Man"	Rick Astley	10	September 17	1
September 24	"One Good Woman"	Peter Cetera	4	October 1	3
September 24	"Don't Be Cruel"	Cheap Trick	4	October 8	5
October 1	"Red Red Wine"	UB40	1	October 15	6
October 1	"I Hate Myself for Loving You"	Joan Jett and the Blackhearts	8	October 1	3
October 1	"What's on Your Mind (Pure Energy)"	Information Society	3	October 22	6
October 8	"A Groovy Kind of Love"	Phil Collins	1	October 22	6
October 8	"Please Don't Go Girl"	New Kids on the Block	10	October 8	1
October 15	"Don't You Know What the Night Can Do?"	Steve Winwood	6	October 29	3
October 15	"Don't Be Cruel"	Bobby Brown	8	October 15	2
October 15	"Wild, Wild West"	The Escape Club	1	November 12	7
October 22	"Kokomo"	The Beach Boys	1	November 5	5
October 22	"The Loco-Motion"	Kylie Minogue	3	November 12	6
October 29	"Never Tear Us Apart"	INXS	7	November 5	3
October 29	"One Moment in Time"	Whitney Houston	5	November 12	4
October 29	"Bad Medicine"	Bon Jovi	1	November 19	6
November 5	"Desire"	U2	3	November 26	5
November 12	"Baby, I Love Your Way/Freebird Medley"	Will to Power	1	December 3	6
November 12	"Kissing a Fool"	George Michael	5	November 26	4
November 19	"How Can I Fall?"	Breathe	3	December 3	5
November 19	"Look Away"	Chicago	1	December 10	8
November 26	"I Don't Want Your Love"	Duran Duran	4	December 3	4
November 26	"Giving You the Best That I Got"	Anita Baker	3	December 17	7
December 3	"Waiting for a Star to Fall"	Boy Meets Girl	5	December 17	6
December 3	"Every Rose Has Its Thorn"	Poison	1	December 24	8
December 10	"Welcome to the Jungle"	Guns N' Roses	7	December 24	4
December 10	"Walk on Water"	Eddie Money	9	December 24	4

=== 1987 peaks ===
List of Billboard Hot 100 top ten singles in 1988 which peaked in 1987
Top ten entry date	Single	Artist(s)	Peak	Peak date	Weeks in top ten
November 21	"Faith" (#1)	George Michael	1	December 12	9
November 28	"Shake Your Love"	Debbie Gibson	4	December 19	7
December 5	"Is This Love"	Whitesnake	2	December 19	7
December 5	"Don't You Want Me"	Jody Watley	6	December 19	6
December 19	"Catch Me (I'm Falling)"	Pretty Poison	8	December 19	3

=== 1989 peaks ===
List of Billboard Hot 100 top ten singles in 1988 which peaked in 1989
Top ten entry date	Single	Artist(s)	Peak	Peak date	Weeks in top ten
December 10	"My Prerogative"	Bobby Brown	1	January 14	7
December 24	"Two Hearts"	Phil Collins	1	January 21	7
December 24	"In Your Room"	The Bangles	5	January 7	4
December 24	"Don't Rush Me"	Taylor Dayne	2	January 21	7

== See also ==
- 1988 in music
- List of Billboard Hot 100 number ones of 1988
- Billboard Year-End Hot 100 singles of 1988
