= Billboard Year-End Hot 100 singles of 1988 =

Ranking of recorded music

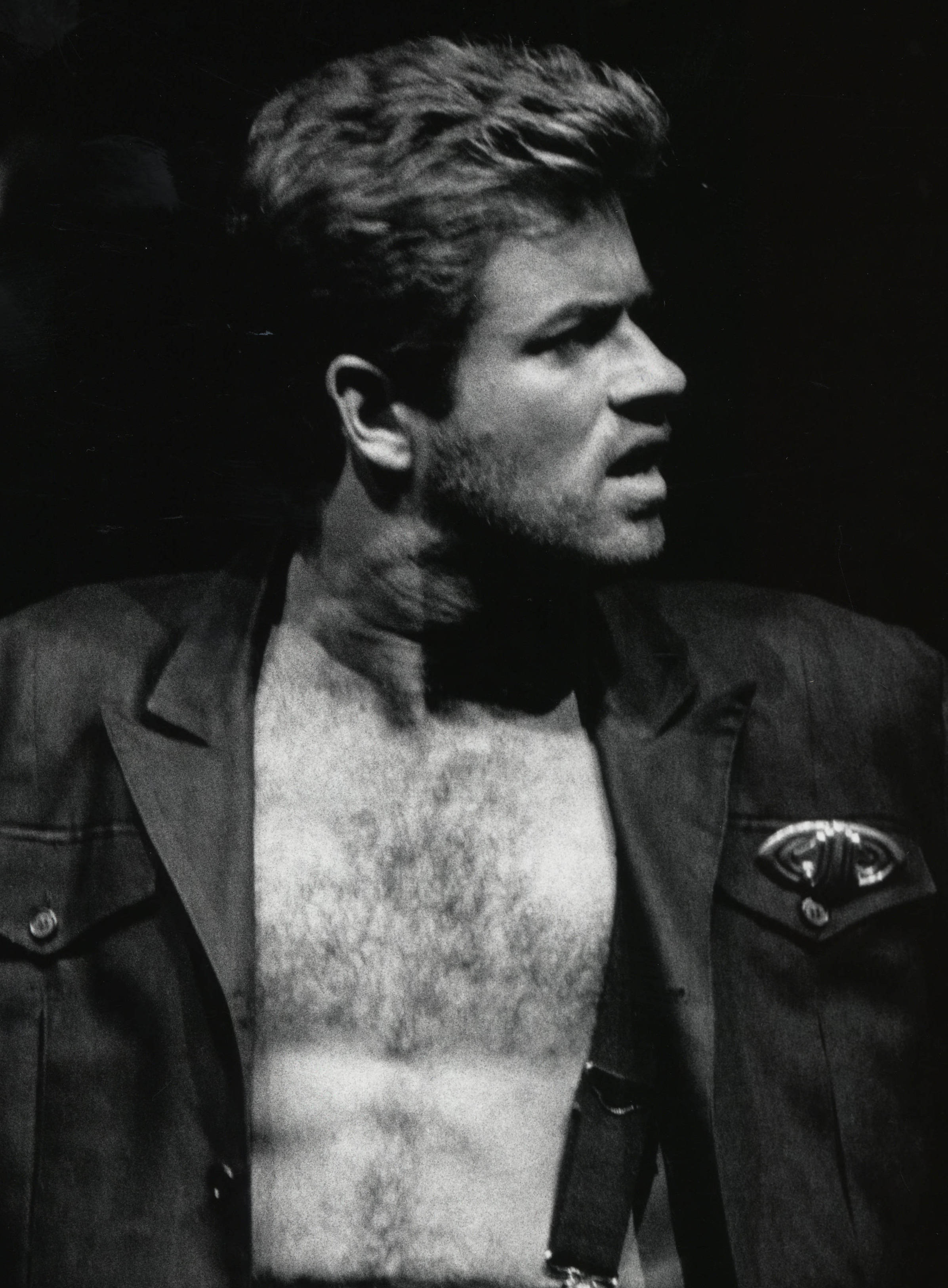
George Michael had the most songs on the Year-End Hot 100 for 1988 with five, including the year's number one song, "Faith".

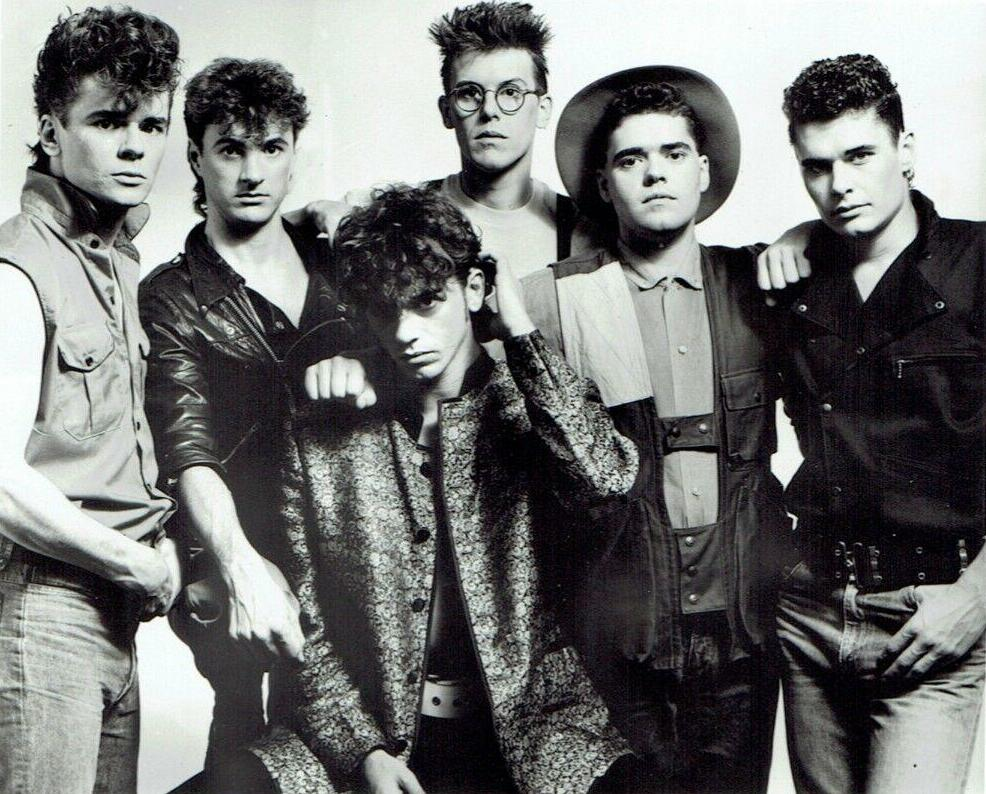
The Australian rock band INXS (pictured in 1983) had four songs on the year-end chart of 1988, including the number-two song of the year, "Need You Tonight".

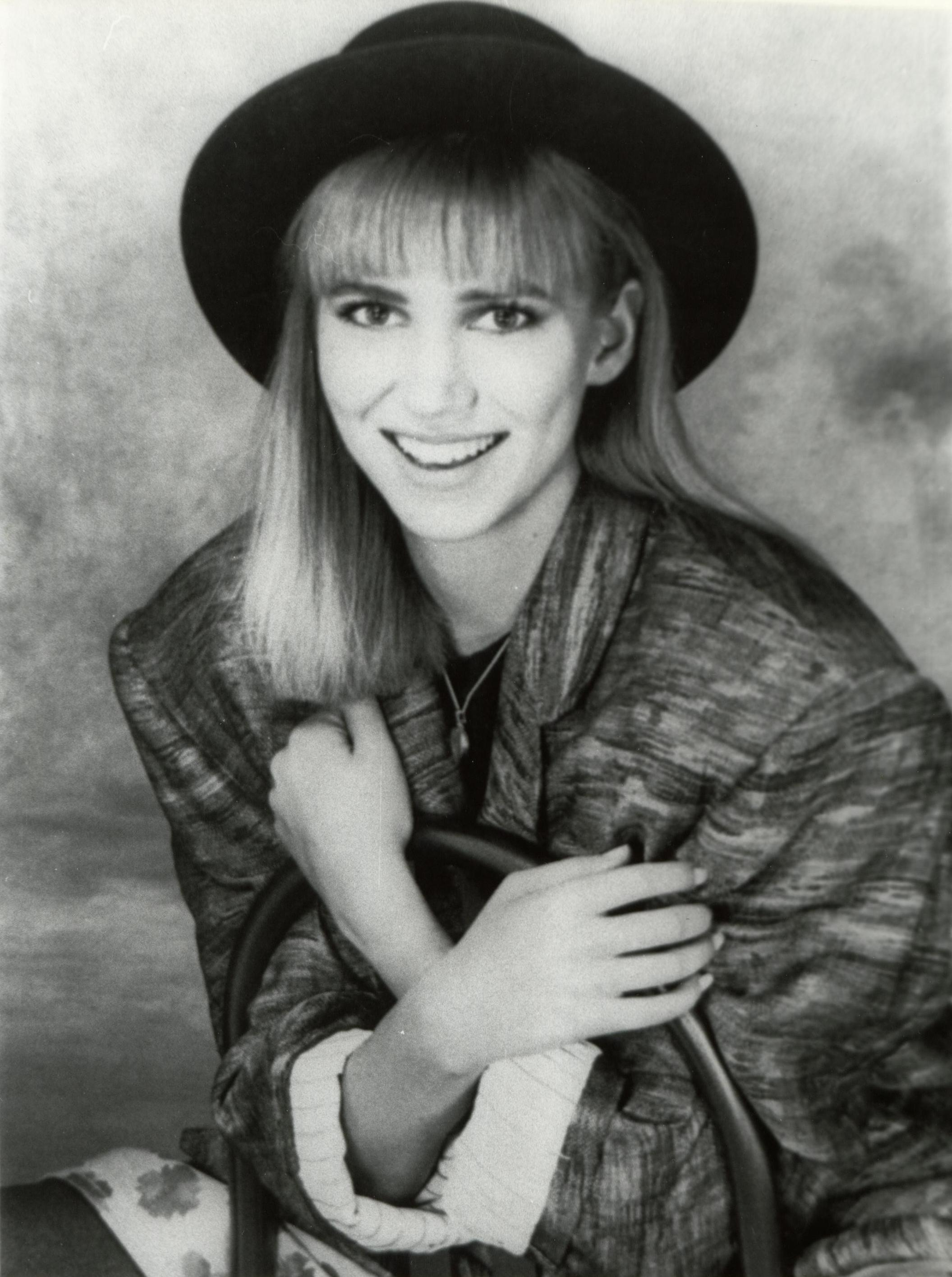
Debbie Gibson's songs "Shake Your Love", "Foolish Beat", and "Out of the Blue" all appeared on 1988's year-end chart.

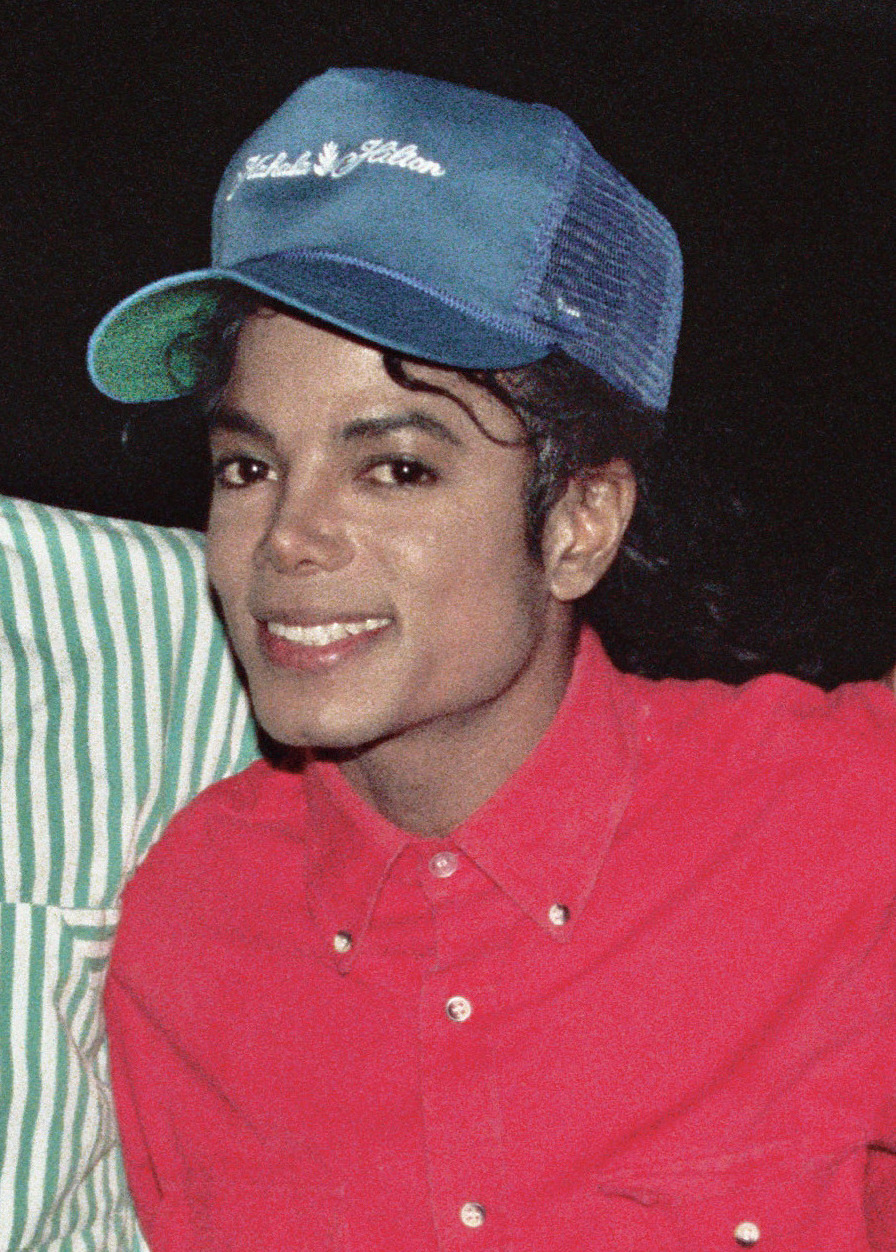
Three songs from Michael Jackson's 1987 album Bad appeared on the 1988 year-end chart: "Man in the Mirror" at number 21, "The Way You Make Me Feel" at number 36, and "Dirty Diana" at number 61.

This is a list of Billboard magazine's Top Hot 100 songs of 1988.

No.	Title	Artist(s)
1	"Faith"	George Michael
2	"Need You Tonight"	INXS
3	"Got My Mind Set on You"	George Harrison
4	"Never Gonna Give You Up"	Rick Astley
5	"Sweet Child o' Mine"	Guns N' Roses
6	"So Emotional"	Whitney Houston
7	"Heaven Is a Place on Earth"	Belinda Carlisle
8	"Could've Been"	Tiffany
9	"Hands to Heaven"	Breathe
10	"Roll with It"	Steve Winwood
11	"One More Try"	George Michael
12	"Wishing Well"	Terence Trent D'Arby
13	"Anything for You"	Gloria Estefan and Miami Sound Machine
14	"The Flame"	Cheap Trick
15	"Get Outta My Dreams, Get into My Car"	Billy Ocean
16	"Seasons Change"	Exposé
17	"Is This Love"	Whitesnake
18	"Wild, Wild West"	The Escape Club
19	"Pour Some Sugar on Me"	Def Leppard
20	"I'll Always Love You"	Taylor Dayne
21	"Man in the Mirror"	Michael Jackson
22	"Shake Your Love"	Debbie Gibson
23	"Simply Irresistible"	Robert Palmer
24	"Hold On to the Nights"	Richard Marx
25	"Hungry Eyes"	Eric Carmen
26	"Shattered Dreams"	Johnny Hates Jazz
27	"Father Figure"	George Michael
28	"Naughty Girls (Need Love Too)"	Samantha Fox
29	"A Groovy Kind of Love"	Phil Collins
30	"Love Bites"	Def Leppard
31	"Endless Summer Nights"	Richard Marx
32	"Foolish Beat"	Debbie Gibson
33	"Where Do Broken Hearts Go"	Whitney Houston
34	"Angel"	Aerosmith
35	"A Hazy Shade of Winter"	The Bangles
36	"The Way You Make Me Feel"	Michael Jackson
37	"Don't Worry, Be Happy"	Bobby McFerrin
38	"Make Me Lose Control"	Eric Carmen
39	"Red Red Wine"	UB40
40	"She's Like the Wind"	Patrick Swayze featuring Wendy Fraser
41	"Bad Medicine"	Bon Jovi
42	"Kokomo"	The Beach Boys
43	"I Don't Wanna Go on with You Like That"	Elton John
44	"Together Forever"	Rick Astley
45	"Monkey"	George Michael
46	"Devil Inside"	INXS
47	"Should've Known Better"	Richard Marx
48	"I Don't Wanna Live Without Your Love"	Chicago
49	"The Loco-Motion"	Kylie Minogue
50	"What Have I Done to Deserve This?"	Pet Shop Boys with Dusty Springfield
51	"Make It Real"	The Jets
52	"What's On Your Mind (Pure Energy)"	Information Society
53	"Tell It to My Heart"	Taylor Dayne
54	"Out of the Blue"	Debbie Gibson
55	"Don't You Want Me"	Jody Watley
56	"Desire"	U2
57	"I Get Weak"	Belinda Carlisle
58	"Sign Your Name"	Terence Trent D'Arby
59	"I Want to Be Your Man"	Roger
60	"Girlfriend"	Pebbles
61	"Dirty Diana"	Michael Jackson
62	"1-2-3"	Gloria Estefan and Miami Sound Machine
63	"Mercedes Boy"	Pebbles
64	"Perfect World"	Huey Lewis and the News
65	"New Sensation"	INXS
66	"Catch Me (I'm Falling)"	Pretty Poison
67	"If It Isn't Love"	New Edition
68	"Rocket 2 U"	The Jets
69	"One Good Woman"	Peter Cetera
70	"Don't Be Cruel"	Cheap Trick
71	"Candle in the Wind"	Elton John
72	"Everything Your Heart Desires"	Daryl Hall & John Oates
73	"Say You Will"	Foreigner
74	"I Want Her"	Keith Sweat
75	"Pink Cadillac"	Natalie Cole
76	"Fast Car"	Tracy Chapman
77	"Electric Blue"	Icehouse
78	"The Valley Road"	Bruce Hornsby and the Range
79	"Don't Be Cruel"	Bobby Brown
80	"Always on My Mind"	Pet Shop Boys
81	"Piano in the Dark"	Brenda Russell featuring Joe Esposito
82	"When It's Love"	Van Halen
83	"Don't Shed a Tear"	Paul Carrack
84	"We'll Be Together"	Sting
85	"I Hate Myself for Loving You"	Joan Jett and the Blackhearts
86	"I Don't Want to Live Without You"	Foreigner
87	"Nite and Day"	Al B. Sure!
88	"Don't You Know What the Night Can Do?"	Steve Winwood
89	"One Moment in Time"	Whitney Houston
90	"Can't Stay Away from You"	Gloria Estefan and Miami Sound Machine
91	"Kissing a Fool"	George Michael
92	"Cherry Bomb"	John Cougar Mellencamp
93	"I Still Believe"	Brenda K. Starr
94	"I Found Someone"	Cher
95	"Never Tear Us Apart"	INXS
96	"Valerie"	Steve Winwood
97	"Just Like Paradise"	David Lee Roth
98	"Nothin' But a Good Time"	Poison
99	"Wait"	White Lion
100	"Prove Your Love"	Taylor Dayne

== See also ==
- 1988 in music
- Billboard Year-End Hot Black Singles of 1988
- List of Billboard Hot 100 number-one singles of 1988
- List of Billboard Hot 100 top-ten singles in 1988
