= Ms. Vocalist =

Studio album by Debbie Gibson
- Released: November 3, 2010 (Standard Edition); January 26, 2011 (Deluxe Edition)
- Genre: Pop; standards
- Length: 59:32 (Standard Edition); 75:18 (Deluxe Edition)
- Label: Sony Music Japan
- Producer: Deborah Gibson; TATOO; Gavin MacKillop

Debbie Gibson chronology
Colored Lights: The Broadway Album (2003)	Ms. Vocalist (2010)	The Singles A's & B's (2017)

Ms. Vocalist is the ninth studio album by American singer-songwriter Debbie Gibson. Released on November 3, 2010, exclusively in Japan by Sony Music Japan, the album features Gibson's English-language covers of popular male-oriented Japanese songs. In addition, the album includes a duet with Mr. Big vocalist Eric Martin and two re-recordings of her number one hit "Lost in Your Eyes", with one version sung in Japanese. A deluxe edition release features four extra re-recordings of songs from her 1987 debut album Out of the Blue, plus a DVD featuring interviews and the music video for "I Love You".

Ms. Vocalist is the female counterpart of Eric Martin's Mr. Vocalist album series.

The album peaked at No. 71 on Oricon's Weekly Albums chart.

Ms. Vocalist was included in the 2017 box set We Could Be Together, making it the first time it was released in western markets.

== Track listing ==
(Deluxe version released on January 26, 2011)

No.	Title	Writer(s)	Original artist	Length
1.	"Tsunami"	Keisuke Kuwata; Kaz Asonuma; Scantana	Southern All Stars	5:14
2.	"Say Yes"	Ryo Asuka; Stephanie Lewis	Chage and Aska	4:44
3.	"I Love You"	Yutaka Ozaki; Leo Imai	Yutaka Ozaki	4:19
4.	"Roman Hikō" ((浪漫飛行; "Romantic Flight"))	Kome Kome Club; Seiji Motoyama	Kome Kome Club	4:52
5.	"Suddenly ~Love Story wa Totsuzen ni~" (Sadenrī ~Rabu Sutōrī wa Totsuzen ni (Suddenly~ラブ・ストーリーは突然に~; "Sudden Love Story"))	Kazumasa Oda; Priscilla Coolidge	Kazumasa Oda (Note: English version originally recorded by Rita Coolidge, from her 1991 cover album Dancing with an Angel.)	4:49
6.	"True Love"	Fumiya Fujii; Motoyama	Fumiya Fujii	3:38
7.	"Hitomi o Tojite" ((瞳をとじて; "Close My Eyes"))	Ken Hirai; Sierra	Ken Hirai	5:22
8.	"Sakura Zaka" ((桜坂; "Cherry Blossom Slope"))	Masaharu Fukuyama; Joe Inoue	Masaharu Fukuyama	4:51
9.	"However"	Takuro; Imai	Glay	5:26
10.	"Robinson" ((ロビンソン))	Masamune Kusano; Motoyama	Spitz	4:49
11.	"Lost in Your Eyes 2010 (Bonus Track)"	Deborah Gibson		3:49
12.	"Sekaijū no Dare Yori Kitto (Ms. Vocalist Version) (with Eric Martin) (Bonus Track)" ((世界中の誰よりきっと (MSV ver.); "Surely More Than Anyone in the World (MSV ver.)"))	Show Wesugi; Miho Nakayama; Tetsurō Oda; Emi Komazaki	Miho Nakayama & Wands	3:53
13.	"Lost in Your Eyes 2010 (Japanese Version) (Bonus Track)"	Gibson; Inoue		3:46
Total length:				59:32

Deluxe Edition bonus tracks
No.	Title	Writer(s)	Length
14.	"Only in My Dreams" (Re-recorded Ver.)	Gibson	3:45
15.	"Shake Your Love" (Re-recorded Ver.)	Gibson	3:39
16.	"Out of the Blue" (Re-recorded Ver.)	Gibson	3:56
17.	"Foolish Beat" (Re-recorded Ver.)	Gibson	4:26
Total length:			75:18

Deluxe Edition DVD
No.	Title	Length
1.	"Special Interview Part 1"
2.	"I Love You" (Music Video)
3.	"Special Interview Part 2"
4.	"Best Hit Cover Festival Digest Footage (Recorded on Nov. 4th 2010)"
5.	"Special Interview Part 3"

== Personnel ==
- Debbie Gibson – vocals (all tracks), piano (11, 13)
- Eric Martin – vocals (12)
- Tōru Meki – electric guitar, acoustic guitar (1, 3–4, 7, 9–10, 12)
- Tim Kobza – electric guitar, acoustic guitar (2, 5–6, 8)
- Takayuki Doi – bass (3)
- Curt Schneider – bass (6)
- Rudy Haeusermann – keyboards, programming (8)
- Tomoyuki Yamada – drums, percussion (1, 3–4, 7, 9–10, 12)
- Ryan Hoyle – drums, percussion (2)
- Victor Indrizzo – drums, percussion (5–6)
- Chica Strings – strings (3)

== Charts ==
Chart (2010)	Peak position
Japanese Albums (Oricon)	71
