= Behind the Eyes =

Behind the Eyes may refer to:

- Behind the Eyes (Tim Moore album)
- Behind the Eyes (Amy Grant album)
- "Behind the Eyes", a song by Deborah Gibson from Memory Lane, Volume 2
- "Behind the Eyes" (Prison Break), a season 5 episode
