= Staying Together =

Staying Together may refer to:

- "Staying Together" (song), a 1988 single from American singer-songwriter-actress Debbie Gibson
- Staying Together (film), a 1989 American comedy-drama film
