= M.Y.O.B. (album) =

Studio album by Deborah Gibson
- Released: March 6, 2001
- Recorded: 2000
- Studios: Eden Roc Studios; Bogart Studios, Miami; Sound Barrier Studios, NYC; JSM Studios, NYC
- Genres: Pop; dance-pop; pop rock; soul
- Length: 49:44; 54:53 (Japan release)
- Labels: Golden Egg; Portazul (Japan)
- Producers: Deborah Gibson; Alessi Brothers; Vibe Patrol; Tony Moran

Deborah Gibson chronology
Deborah (1997)	M.Y.O.B. (2001)	Colored Lights: The Broadway Album (2003)

Singles from M.Y.O.B.
- 1. "What You Want" Released: September 2000; 2. "Your Secret" Released: October 2001

Japan release cover

Professional ratings
Review scores
Source	Rating
Allmusic	3/5 stars

M.Y.O.B. (a.k.a. Mind Your Own Business) is the seventh studio album by American singer-songwriter Debbie Gibson, released on March 6, 2001 on her own Golden Egg record label. It was released in Japan by Nippon Columbia under the Portazul label with the bonus track "Light the World" featuring Peabo Bryson.

The album was included in the 2017 box set We Could Be Together, with two additional songs and two remixes as bonus tracks.

== Singles ==
- "M.Y.O.B." was the first track released as a promotional single in 2000.
- "What Your Want" was the first official single released, complete with an accompanying music video.
- "Your Secret" was the third single released from the album in 2001 on both CD and vinyl.
- "The One" was later released as a promo single exclusively in Japan.

== Reception ==
AllMusic were mostly favorable in their review of the album, commenting that "the music here is proof positive that Gibson is living in a self-contained fantasy world; for that reason it is a lot more intriguing than the standard pop of today. In fact, if anyone other than Gibson were singing this material, exactly as she sings it here, it would make the Top Ten... Deborah Gibson has nothing to prove to anyone. She knows the music industry like the palm of her hand. With M.Y.O.B. she has placed herself in the realm of top trends, something she has not done so perfectly for quite some time." Billboard said the album "showcases her skills as a singer/songwriter, producer/arranger, and record company honcho with her own Golden Egg Records."

Billboard praised the first single, "What Your Want", declaring that "the indefatigable Deborah Gibson is one of those rare, highly driven artists and businesswomen who refuses to shut down shop just because top 40 trends changed and radio moved in a different direction...fans and radio alike will find the sensuous, dance-injected "What You Want" a cutting-edge moment, featuring the recognizable vocals of this old friend and soul-saturating production from never failing maestro Tony Moran. Time to let go of any lingering prejudices you may have and let your audience realize that this artist remains a vital part of the scene. Could be the secret weapon hit of the season. The single received light airplay in Spring 2001 but did not chart.

In their review of the next single, "Your Secret" Billboard stated that "'Your Secret' is a joyous dancefloor throwdown that sports all the elements that her fan base counts on: rich layers of harmonies, creative, current-day production, and a chorus that just won't quit...There's something for everybody here, including forward-thinking rhythmic-oriented top 40 outlets." "Your Secret" was released as a single with remixes by Mike Rizzo; the song did not chart.

Gibson's company, Golden Egg Records, coordinated a set of remixes of "Jaded" from remixer Musica Technica but shut down before the remixes were released.

== Track listing ==
All tracks are produced by Deborah Ann Gibson and Vibe Patrol, except where indicated.

North American release
No.	Title	Writer(s)	Producer(s)	Length
1.	"M.Y.O.B."	Billy and Bobby Alessi	Alessi Brothers	4:00
2.	"Your Secret"	Gibson; Jerry Sharell		4:08
3.	"What You Want"	Gibson; Rudy Haeusermann	Tony Moran	3:42
4.	"Down That Road"	Gibson; Gary Haase		4:49
5.	"The One"	Gibson; Chynna Phillips		4:13
6.	"Wishing You Were Here"	Gibson; Sharell		3:35
7.	"What Part of No"	Gibson; Haase		5:16
8.	"In Blue"	Gibson		6:05
9.	"Jaded"	Gibson		4:11
10.	"Knock Three Times" (Duet with Tony Orlando)	L. Russell Brown; Irwin Levine		5:11
11.	"M.Y.O.B." (Dance Mix)	Billy and Bobby Alessi	Alessi Brothers	4:23
Total length:				49:44

Japan bonus track
No.	Title	Writer(s)	Producer(s)	Length
12.	"Light the World" (Featuring Peabo Bryson)	Gibson	Masaru Nishiyama; Michael T. Martin	5:07
Total length:				54:53

== Personnel ==
- Deborah Gibson – vocals, rhythm arrangements (2, 4, 6, 8), vocal arrangements (2–8, 10), acoustic piano (6)
- Billy Alessi – programming (1), arrangements (1), backing vocals (1)
- Bobby Alessi – programming (1), arrangements (1), backing vocals (1)
- Gary Corbett – keyboards (2, 4–10), programming (2, 4–10), arrangements (2, 4–6, 8–10), vocal arrangements (9)
- Mike Lorello – keyboards (3), programming (3)
- Tom Keane – keyboards (12), programming (12), strings (12), arrangements (12)
- Ira Siegel – guitars (1)
- Paul Pesco – guitars (2, 4–10)
- Larry Saltzman – guitars (11)
- Michael Landau – guitars (12)
- Steve Lashley – bass (5, 6, 8)
- Zev Katz – bass (7, 9)
- Conrad Korsch – bass (10)
- David Simmons – drum programming (5), drums (6, 8)
- Shawn Pelton – drums (7, 9)
- Bashiri Johnson – percussion (2, 4–6, 8–10)
- Alex Elena – percussion (7)
- David Boruff – saxophone (12)
- Rudy Haeusermann – arrangements (2, 3, 6)
- Bob Rosa – arrangements (2, 10)
- Tony Moran – rhythm and vocal arrangements (3)
- Gary Hasse – arrangements (4)
- Jerry Sharell – vocal arrangements (6)
- "Z" Man – arrangements (8)
- Masaru Nishiyama – arrangements (12)
- Robin Clark – backing vocals (2, 5, 8)
- Cindy Mizelle – backing vocals (2, 4–10)
- Fonzi Thornton – backing vocals (2, 4–10), vocal arrangements (4, 8, 9)
- Nicki Richards – backing vocals (3)
- Zhana Saunders – backing vocals (3)
- Orfeh – backing vocals (4)
- Brenda White King – backing vocals (4, 6, 7, 9, 10)
- Tony Orlando – vocals (10), vocal arrangements (10)
- Curtis King – backing vocals (10)
- Frank Simms – backing vocals (10)
- Ken Williams – backing vocals (10)
- Rachele Cappelli – backing vocals (11)
- Vivian Cherry – backing vocals (11)
- Charisse Davis – backing vocals (11)
- Lani Groves – backing vocals (11)
- Mongo Slade – rap (11)
- Peabo Bryson – vocals (12)

Miami Symphonic Strings on "The One"

- Alfredo Oliva – concertmaster
- Christopher Giansdorp – cello
- Tim Barnes – viola
- Scott Flavin – violin
- Orlando J. Forte – violin
- Mei Mei Luo – violin

Kids chant on "M.Y.O.B"

- Blake Alessi, Darla Alessi, Diana Lampiasi, Rebecca Lampiasi, Erin Reilly and Lynley Reilly

=== Production ===
- Diane Gibson-Reichman – executive producer, management
- The Alessi Brothers – mixing (11)
- Jon Berman – recording (1), additional recording (6, 10)
- Dave Sarenson – recording (1, 3), mix engineer (1, 3)
- Michael Golub – mix engineer (1), producer (11), engineer (11), mixing (11)
- Bob Rosa – recording (2, 4–10)
- Mark Rubenstein – Pro Tools engineer (3)
- RJ Pirchinello – recording assistant (1, 10, 11)
- Tom Todia – assistant engineer (2, 4–10)
- Marc Algranti – recording assistant (2, 5, 8)
- Greg Calbi – mastering at Sterling Sound (New York, NY)
- Heather Moore – album coordinator
- Krista Vossen – album layout, artistic design
- Don Flood – photography
- Bruce Wayne – hair, make-up

Japan release

- Ken Komoguchi – A&R
- Thom Kidd – recording (12)
- Jeffrey "Woody" Woodruff – mixing (12)
- Hiroyuki Hasaka – mastering (12) at Nippon Columbia Studios (Tokyo, Japan)
- Jun Takagi – design
- Hiroshi Ajimoto – inner editing
- Yuji Muraoka – liner notes
