= Hitomi o Tojite =

Single by Ken Hirai

from the album Sentimentalovers
- Released: April 28, 2004
- Genre: Pop
- Length: 5:43
- Label: Defstar Records
- Songwriter: Ken Hirai
- Producer: Seiji Kameda

Ken Hirai singles chronology
"Style" (2004)	"Hitomi o Tojite" (2004)	"Kimi wa Tomodachi" (2004)

Audio sample
- "Hitomi o Tojite": file; help

Music video
- "Hitomi o Tojite" on YouTube

"Hitomi o Tojite" (瞳(ひとみ)をとじて; lit. 'Close My Eyes') is a song recorded by Japanese singer Ken Hirai, from his sixth studio album Sentimentalovers. It was released by Defstar Records as the album's second single on April 28, 2004. It is the theme song to the film Crying Out Love in the Center of the World. "Hitomi o Tojite" was the most successful song of 2004, topping the year-end Oricon Singles Chart with over 800,000 units sold. Hirai performed the song on his fourth appearance on Kōhaku Uta Gassen on December 31, 2004. "Hitomi o Tojite" was one of the eleven recipients of the Japan Gold Disc Award for Song of the Year. Although the song was considered for contention at the 46th Japan Record Awards, Hirai declined the Japan Record Award nomination.

== Cover versions ==
In 2005, Park Yong-ha recorded a Korean version of the song for his EP Sometime. The same year, the song was covered by Jung Jae Wook, dubbed "With My Eyes Closed" (가만히 눈을 감고), and subsequently included on the album 13th Month Love (13월의 사랑) (2006). In 2015, Jung collaborated with the vocal group Heart B on a remake of the song. In 2006, Chris Yu recorded a Mandarin Chinese version of the song, dubbed "Wo Ke Yi" (我可以), for his album The Poet's Tears (詩人的眼淚).

In 2007, G-Families recorded the first Japanese cover of the song for their cover album Paradox II: New COVER. In 2008, Ameji recorded a jazz version of the song for his cover album Love Stories. The same year, the song was covered by Ayumi Nakamura, Akira Fuse and Anri for their cover albums Voice, Ballade and Tears of Anri 2, respectively. Debbie Gibson covered the song in English on her 2010 cover album Ms. Vocalist. In 2012, 2AM recorded a cover of the song which was included as a B-side to their single "Denwa ni Denai Kimi ni" (電話に出ない君に), Beni covered the song in English for the cover album Cover' and Lisa recorded a version of the song featuring Kotaro Oshio for her fifth studio album Family. In 2013, Chris Hart and Ayaka recorded covers of the song for their respective cover albums Heart Song and Yūon Club: 1st Grade. In 2014, Mirei Touyama included a cover of the song as a B-side to her single "Memories". In 2015, Minami Kizuki recorded a cover of the song for her first cover album Sakuranagashi, released on January 21. The same day, Sumire Haruno released the Takarazuka cover album Reijin which included a cover of the song.

== Chart performance ==
"Hitomi o Tojite" debuted at number 2 on the Oricon Singles Chart with 77,000 units sold, short of the second-week total tallied by Hikaru Utada's "Dareka no Negai ga Kanau Koro". The song spent the following four weeks alternating between number 2 and 3, blocked from the top spot by new releases. The single stayed in the top five for an additional five weeks, bringing its ten-week total to just shy of the 600,000 mark. "Hitomi o Tojite" charted in and out of the top twenty until the end of October 2004. The single came back into the top twenty for a week in January 2005, following Hirai's performance on Kōhaku Uta Gassen. "Hitomi o Tojite" charted for fifty-nine weeks on the Oricon Singles Chart, selling a reported total of 893,000 copies during its run. The single topped the year-end chart and charted in the top ten of the monthly chart for three straight months.

== Track listing ==
All tracks are written by Ken Hirai, except 2 by Glenn Frey and Don Henley.

No.	Title	Arranger(s)	Length
1.	"Hitomi o Tojite" (瞳をとじて, "Close My Eyes")	Seiji Kameda	5:43
2.	"Desperado"	Masaru Suzuki	4:04
3.	"Hitomi o Tojite" (Less Vocal)	Kameda	5:41
Total length:			15:28

== Charts ==
Chart (2004)	Peak position
Japan Weekly Singles (Oricon)	2
Japan Monthly Singles (Oricon)	2
Japan Yearly Singles (Oricon)	1

== Certifications ==
Region	Certification	Certified units/sales
Japan (RIAJ) Physical single	3× Platinum	750,000^{^}
Japan (RIAJ) Digital single	2× Platinum	500,000^{*}
Japan (RIAJ) Ringtone	Million	1,000,000^{*}
^{*} Sales figures based on certification alone.^{^} Shipments figures based on certification alone.

== See also ==
- List of best-selling singles in Japan
