= Deborah (album) =

Studio album by Debbie Gibson
- Released: June 11, 1997
- Recorded: November 1996–March 1997
- Studios: The Hit Factory and Soundworks (New York City, New York); On the Mark Studios (Los Angeles, California); Cocoa Butt Studios (Culver City, California); The Enterprise (Burbank, California); Schnee Studios (North Hollywood, California); Studio 19 and Valley Studios (Nashville, Tennessee); Blue Studios (London, UK)
- Genres: Pop; dance-pop; pop rock
- Length: 56:41 (DGIF release); 56:34 (Standard release); 62:38 (Japan release)
- Labels: Espiritu; Portazul (Japan)
- Producers: Deborah Gibson; Richard Drummie; Mark Portmann; Steve Rosen; Tony Visconti; Junior Vasquez

Debbie Gibson chronology
Greatest Hits (1995)	Deborah (1997)	M.Y.O.B (2001)

Singles from Deborah
- 1. "Only Words" Released: April 1997; 2. "Moonchild" Released: November 1997; 3. "Naturally" Released: February 1998

Japan release cover

Professional ratings
Review scores
Source	Rating
Allmusic	3/5 stars

Deborah is the sixth studio album by American singer-songwriter Debbie Gibson. Released on June 11, 1997, under Gibson's own record label, Espiritu Records, this was the first release where the singer was credited with her full name. The original release sold to Debbie Gibson International Fan Club (DGIF) members includes her covers of "People" and "Don't Rain on My Parade" from Funny Girl, as she starred in the off-Broadway production tour of the musical the previous year. The second release for the general market replaced the Funny Girl covers with "Only Words" (Dance Edit) and a re-recording of Gibson's 1987 debut single "Only in My Dreams".

In Japan, the album was released as Moonchild on November 29, 1997, by Nippon Columbia under the Portazul label. It includes all tracks from both versions of the U.S. release.

The album was included in the 2017 box set We Could Be Together, with the track listing based on the original DGIF release and two additional songs and three remixes as bonus tracks.

== Singles ==
- "Only Words" is the first dance maxi-single from the album. Released in the U.S. in 1997 and peaking at #38 on the Hot Dance chart,
- "Moonchild" released in 1997.
- "Naturally" is the third and final single from Deborah Gibson's album, released in 1997. "Naturally" was released as a single exclusively in Japan in 1998.

== Reception ==
In their review of the first single, "Only Words" Billboard stated that "Gibson has decided to have a little fun again. She hits the dancefloor with exhausting energy, romping through this fast-paced anthem with an infectious grin and a sing-along chorus. This may be characteristic of Gibson's past club glories, but it sure isn't indicative of superstar remixer Junior Vasquez's past efforts. He momentarily eschews the tribal darkness of his previous recordings in favor of a sunny sound that is awash in delightful, pastel-like keyboards. Perfect for the tambourine-shaking tea-dance set."

AllMusic were favorable in their review of the album, commenting that "after a brief flirtation with both alternative rock and adult contemporary balladeering, Debbie Gibson decided it was time to return to her pop roots with her sixth album. The only difference is, this time she's in control. Forming her own label, Espiritu, and billing herself as Deborah Gibson (evidently to convey that she is indeed mature), she turns in a surprisingly winning effort with Deborah. Although the record still suffers from inconsistent material, it's nice to hear her play dance-pop again, and her ballads are generally more melodic and memorable than those on Think With Your Heart. It may not be a commercial success on the level of Out of the Blue, but Deborah is a considerable artistic comeback."

== Track listing ==
All tracks are written by Deborah Gibson, except where indicated.

Original DGIF release
No.	Title	Writer(s)	Producer(s)	Length
1.	"Prelude"		Gibson	0:19
2.	"Ode to a Would Be Lover"		Gibson	4:11
3.	"Moonchild"	Gibson; Joy Swinea	Richard Drummie	4:40
4.	"Only Words"		Mark Portmann	3:24
5.	"Naturally"		Portmann	3:55
6.	"Nobody's You"		Steve Rosen	3:45
7.	"Cry Tonight"	Gibson; Swinea	Drummie	3:25
8.	"Where I Wanna Be"		Portmann	4:53
9.	"Butterflies Are Free"		Portmann	3:41
10.	"Give Me Your Love"		Rosen	4:11
11.	"Just Wasn't Love"		Portmann	4:07
12.	"I Can't"		Rosen	4:14
13.	"People"	Jule Styne; Bob Merrill	Tony Visconti	3:03
14.	"Don't Rain on My Parade"	Styne; Merrill	Visconti	2:59
15.	"I Will Let You Go"		Portmann	3:13
Total length:				56:41

Standard release
No.	Title	Producer(s)	Length
13.	"I Will Let You Go"	Portmann	3:13
14.	"Only Words" (Dance Edit)	Junior Vasquez	3:56
15.	"Only in My Dreams" (1997 Dance Edit)	Vasquez	4:38
Total length:			56:34

Japan release
No.	Title	Writer(s)	Producer(s)	Length
13.	"I Will Let You Go"		Portmann	3:13
14.	"Only Words" (Dance Edit)		Vasquez	3:56
15.	"Only in My Dreams" (1997 Dance Edit)		Vasquez	4:38
16.	"People"	Styne; Merrill	Visconti	3:03
17.	"Don't Rain on My Parade"	Styne; Merrill	Visconti	2:59
Total length:				62:38

== Personnel ==
- Deborah Gibson – acoustic piano (1, 2), keyboards (1, 2), arrangements (1, 2), vocals (2–17), backing vocals (3, 4, 6, 8–10, 12, 14)
- Richard Cottle – keyboards (3, 7)
- Mark Portmann – keyboard programming (4, 5, 9, 11, 13, 14), arrangements (4, 5, 8, 9, 11, 13, 14)
- Steve Rosen – acoustic piano (6, 10, 12), keyboards (6, 10, 12), arrangements (6, 10, 12), drum programming (10, 12)
- Joe Moskowitz – programming (14)
- Tom Salta – keyboards (15), programming (15)
- Tony Visconti – arrangements (16, 17)
- Carlos Alomar – acoustic guitar (2), electric guitar (2)
- Richard Drummie – guitars (3, 7), mandolin (3), drum programming (3, 7), arrangements (3, 7), keyboards (7)
- Michael Thompson – electric guitar (4, 5, 9, 11, 13, 14), guitars (8), acoustic guitar (11)
- Dean Parks – acoustic guitar (5)
- Larry Knight – acoustic guitar (6, 10, 12), electric guitar (6, 10, 12)
- Conrad Korsch – bass (2)
- Chris Childs – bass (3)
- John Patitucci – bass samples (6, 10, 12)
- Richie Morales – drums (2, 16, 17))
- Mark "Tuffy" Evans – drum programming (3, 7)
- George Perilli – drums (6, 10, 12)
- Bashiri Johnson – percussion (2)
- Rafael Padilla – percussion (8)
- Reynaldo Andrews – handclaps (9)
- Beth Raven – percussion (16, 17)
- Robin Clark – backing vocals (3, 4, 9, 10, 14)
- B.J. Nelson – backing vocals (3, 4, 9, 10, 14)
- Fonzi Thornton – backing vocals (3, 4, 9, 10, 14)
- Dillon Dixon – backing vocals (6, 10, 12)
- Anna-Jane Casey – vocals (7)
- Andrea Robinson – backing vocals (8)
- Chris Bruno – French intro (12)
- Joanne Borts – backing vocals (15)
- Sally Ries – backing vocals (15)

=== Production ===
- Mark Portmann – recording (4, 5, 8, 9, 11, 13, 14)
- Junior Vasquez – post-production (14), mixing (14), remixing (14, 15)
- Tony Visconti – mixing (16, 17)
- Andy Grassi – engineer (2, 16, 17), mixing (2)
- Mark Evans – recording (3, 7), mix engineer (3, 7)
- Alex Rodriguez – mixing (4, 5, 8, 9, 11, 13, 14)
- Bill Schnee – mixing (6, 10, 12)
- David Matthews – drum recording (6, 10, 12)
- P. Dennis Mitchell – mix engineer (14, 15), recording (15)
- Marc Goodman – recording (15)
- Bob Biles – vocal recording (15)
- Dave Goodermuth – assistant engineer (2, 16, 17)
- Dave Hancock – mix assistant (4, 5, 8, 9, 11, 13, 14)
- Carlton Batts – mastering
