= Think with Your Heart =

Studio album by Debbie Gibson
- Released: July 4, 1995
- Recorded: December 1994–April 1995
- Studio: RPM Studios, Power Station, The Hit Factory and Sony Music Studios (New York City, New York); Garage Studios (Long Island, New York); Air Lyndhurst (London, UK)
- Genre: Adult contemporary; pop rock
- Length: 42:35
- Label: SBK
- Producer: Deborah Gibson

Debbie Gibson chronology
Body, Mind, Soul (1994)	Think with Your Heart (1995)	Greatest Hits (1996)

Singles from Think With Your Heart
- 1. "For Better or Worse" Released: June 1995; 2. "Didn't Have the Heart" Released: November 1996

Professional ratings
Review scores
Source	Rating
Allmusic	2/5 stars
People	Unfavorable

Think with Your Heart is the fifth studio album by American singer-songwriter Debbie Gibson. It was released on July 4, 1995 via SBK Records, a label under EMI, and was her first album not released under her long-time label Atlantic Records. This album mostly focused on the adult contemporary market and as such the majority of the content included are ballads. Gibson solely produced the record and wrote all but one song. She largely recorded the album with a live orchestra.

Receiving mixed reviews, the album was a commercial failure, failing to enter the Billboard 200 or Cashbox albums chart. It did enter the top-fifty of the Oricon Albums Chart in Japan, hitting number 46. The album was included in the 2017 box set We Could Be Together, with the Japan-only bonus tracks included.

== Singles ==
"For Better or Worse" was released as the lead single from the album in June 1995, receiving a positive review from Billboard magazine praising it as a "beautiful pop ballad that displays her marked maturity as both a singer and songwriter." It was then commercially released in Japan on August 26, 1995. The album's second and final single, "Didn't Have the Heart" was released in November 1995. Billboard also gave the single a positive review. Both singles notably failed to enter any Billboard charts, although "For Better or Worse" did chart on the Radio & Records Adult Contemporary chart, peaking at number 30.

== Reception ==
Billboard praised the album, nothing that "in her continuing efforts to establish herself as a credible, adult contemporary artist, onetime teen star Debbie Gibson delivers an album of well-written, passionately performed piano ballads and pop tunes. Despite the absence of a sure-fire smash, much of the material here stands a good shot of obtaining AC and Top 40 airplay."

Cashbox were mostly positive in their appraisal, stating that "unlike many pre-packaged teen stars, Gibson always held aspirations of being a musician, not just a product. Whether she succeeds or not, at least she tries. On her latest effort the now 21 year-old singer/songwriter wrote 11 of the 12 tracks... some of the tracks are over-produced, but so are most of today’s hits. In addition, her cover of “Will You Love Me Tomorrow” is lovely. Gibson will never be a major artistic force, but cut the girl some slack, she’s earned it."

AllMusic were more mixed in their review, commenting that the album was "a collection of soft, adult contemporary-oriented ballads that don't even have a hint of the dance-pop that sent her to the top of the charts. Perhaps that was intended as a sign of maturity, but it comes across as a lack of ideas - by the end of the record, she has stated all of her musical concepts at least twice. The first time around, they're pleasant but it gets a little monotonous after a while. Gibson remains a talented songwriter and arranger, but she needs to push herself a bit to come up with something a bit more melodic and varied to win back her old audience."

The Vindicator named it the fifth worst album of 1995.

== Track listing ==
All tracks are written by Deborah Gibson, except where indicated.

No.	Title	Writer(s)	Length
1.	"For Better or Worse"		3:24
2.	"Didn't Have the Heart"		4:45
3.	"Will You Love Me Tomorrow?"	Gerry Goffin; Carole King	3:26
4.	"Dancin' in My Mind"		3:31
5.	"Dontcha Want Me Now?"		4:19
6.	"Can't Do It Alone"		4:27
7.	"Think with Your Heart"		3:22
8.	"Too Fancy"		2:11
9.	"You Don't Have to See"		3:49
10.	"Two Young Kids"		3:15
11.	"Interlude/Tony's Rehearsal"		0:41
12.	"Let's Run Away"		5:25
Total length:			42:35

Japan bonus tracks
No.	Title	Length
13.	"Call Yourself a Lover"	3:09
14.	"You Know Me"	3:49

== Personnel ==
Musicians

- Deborah Gibson – vocals, acoustic piano (1–7, 9, 10, 12), keyboards (14)
- Steve Rosen – keyboards (2–6, 9, 10, 12–14), Hammond B3 organ (5, 9), acoustic piano (8, 13)
- Ira Siegel – guitars (1), acoustic guitar (3, 14), electric guitar (14)
- John Leventhal – guitars (6), mandolin (6), electric guitar (9, 12), acoustic guitar (9, 12)
- Bob Cranshaw – bass guitar (1)
- T-Bone Wolk – bass guitar (2–6, 8–10, 12–14)
- Steve Jordan – drums (1)
- Russ Kunkel – drums (2–6, 8–10, 13, 14), percussion (6, 9, 10, 14), congas (12)
- Bashiri Johnson – percussion (2–4, 10, 12, 13)
- Richie Cannata – tenor saxophone (4, 5, 8, 9, 13)
- Arno Hecht – baritone saxophone (5, 8, 13)
- Ozzie Melendez – trombone (5, 8, 13)
- Alan Chez – trumpet (5, 8, 13)
- Shelley Woodworth – oboe (10)
- May Pang – string contractor (1)
- Gavyn Wright – violin solo (2)
- The London Session Orchestra – strings (2–4, 6, 7, 10, 12)
- Robin Clark – backing vocals (3, 5, 6, 9, 13)
- Michelle Cobbs – backing vocals (3, 5, 6, 9, 13)
- B.J. Nelson – backing vocals (3, 5, 6, 9, 13)
- Diva Gray – backing vocals (3, 9, 13)
- Fonzi Thornton – backing vocals (3, 5, 6, 9, 13)

Production

- Brian Koppelman – A&R
- Deborah Gibson – producer
- Niko Bolas – engineer, mixing
- Nathaniel Kunkel – engineer
- Geoff Foster – engineer
- Jon Bailey – assistant engineer
- Suzanne Dyer – assistant engineer
- Andy Grassi – assistant engineer, mix assistant
- Danny Kadar – mix assistant
- David Kutch – assistant engineer
- Glen Marchese – assistant engineer
- Steve Orchard – assistant engineer
- Rory Romano – assistant engineer
- David Voigt – assistant engineer
- Dave Collins – mastering at A&M Mastering Studios (Hollywood, California)
- Jill Dell'Abate – production coordination
- Henry Marquez – art direction
- LuAnn Graffeo – art direction
- Etsuko Iseki – design
- Alberto Tolot – photography
- Diane Gibson – management
- Karen Gibson Lampiasi – management

== Charts ==
Chart (1995)	Peak position
Japanese Albums (Oricon)	46
