= For Better or Worse (song) =

Single by Debbie Gibson

from the album Think with Your Heart
- B-side: "Call Yourself a Lover"
- Released: June 1992
- Genre: Pop
- Length: 3:24
- Label: SBK
- Songwriter: Debbie Gibson
- Producer: Debbie Gibson

Debbie Gibson singles chronology
"You're the One That I Want" (1990)	"For Better or Worse" (1992)	"Didn't Have the Heart" (1992)

"For Better or Worse" is a song by American singer-songwriter and actress Debbie Gibson, written and produced entirely by her. It was her first single released under SBK Records following her departure from Atlantic Records. The track was released in June 1992 in the United States exclusively to adult contemporary radio and was later released commercially in Japan.

== Critical reception ==
Larry Flick of Billboard gave the track a positive review saying, "Gibson makes her SBK debut with a beautiful pop ballad that displays her marked maturity as both a singer and songwriter. She sounds quite comfortable amid the song's measured arrangement, which features delicate lead piano lines and a 44-piece orchestra. Although this single is aimed directly at AC radio, there is no denying the potential for impact among the prom-going youth set. A fine introduction to the forthcoming Think with Your Heart set."

== Chart performance ==
As a radio-exclusive single, "For Better or Worse" was ineligible to enter the US Billboard Hot 100. Nevertheless, the track failed to enter any Billboard charts upon its release. It did briefly chart on the adult contemporary charts of Radio & Records and the Gavin Report, hitting number 30 on both charts.

== Music video ==
A music video was filmed for the song, directed by James Yukich who Gibson has worked with multiple times before. The video opens with Gibson sitting on a stairwell. Shots span between a house and a city where Gibson and a male actor are holding hands and hugging.

== Track listing ==
Japanese CD single

1. "For Better or Worse" – 3:22
2. "Call Yourself a Lover" – 3:09

== Personnel ==
Taken from the Think with Your Heart booklet.

- Deborah Gibson – piano
- Bob Cranshaw – bass
- Steve Jordan – drums
- Ira Siegel – guitar

== Charts and release history ==
Weekly chart performance for "For Better or Worse"
Chart (1992)	Peak position
US Adult Contemporary (Radio & Records)	30
US Adult Contemporary (Gavin Report)	30

Release dates and format(s) for "For Better or Worse"
Region	Date	Format(s)	Label(s)	Ref.
United States	June 1992	Adult contemporary radio	SBK	
Japan	August 29, 1992	Mini CD single	SBK	
