= Out of the Blue (Debbie Gibson album) =

Studio album by Debbie Gibson
- Released: August 18, 1987
- Recorded: 1986–1987
- Studios: Z Studio, Brooklyn; Sorcerer Sound, NYC; Right Track, NYC; Quad Recording, NYC; International Sound, Miami
- Genres: Dance-pop; teen pop
- Length: 40:53
- Label: Atlantic
- Producers: Fred Zarr; Deborah Gibson; John Morales; Sergio Munzibai; Lewis A. Martineé

Debbie Gibson chronology
Out of the Blue (1987)	Electric Youth (1989)

Singles from Out of the Blue
- 1. "Only in My Dreams" Released: February 1987; 2. "Shake Your Love" Released: September 1987; 3. "Red Hot" Released: November 1987; 4. "Out of the Blue" Released: January 1988; 5. "Foolish Beat" Released: April 1988; 6. "Staying Together" Released: September 1988

Professional ratings
Review scores
Source	Rating
AllMusic	4.5/5 stars
Number One	4/5 stars
The Village Voice	C+

Out of the Blue is the debut studio album by American singer-songwriter Debbie Gibson, released on August 18, 1987, by Atlantic Records. The album received favorable reviews from music critics and sold more than three million copies in the United States (three times platinum by RIAA) and five million copies worldwide.

== Background ==
A 16-year-old Gibson wrote all ten songs on this album, which reveals her very early talent for composing. As executive producer, Douglas Breitbart of Broadbeard Productions, Inc. (whom Gibson's mother had hired as manager five years before), assembled a team of producers from both New York and Florida: Fred Zarr, John Morales, Sergio Munzibai and Lewis A. Martineé.

Zarr produced "Shake Your Love" and "Fallen Angel" in addition to "Only in My Dreams," and co-produced "Out of the Blue," "Staying Together" and "Wake Up to Love" with Gibson, sole producer for "Foolish Beat." Morales and Munzibai produced "Red Hot" and "Between the Lines." Martineé produced "Play the Field".

While posing for the album cover, the photographer told Gibson that her knee was pulling focus. She refused to change her pose so a compromise was reached with the makeup artist drawing a face on her knee. Consequently, this became a trend among her young female fans.

Out of the Blue made No. 7 on the U.S. Billboard 200 chart and No. 26 on the UK Albums Chart. The album sold over three million copies in the United States, and five million copies worldwide.

== Reception ==
In their review of the album, Billboard stated that the "sixteen- year-old singer's low profile is not commensurate with her talent or success. "Only in my Dreams" is a top 15 hit; title track should follow up handily. Both – along with rest of the album's material – were written by Gibson, portending much in the way of staying power."

Cashbox noted that the album was "a fond remembrance of pop idols of times past. This 16-year old Long Island native has leaped into the pop/dance arena with wide eyes and a penchant for writing flowing ballads and sizzling dance grooves."

Allmusic concedes that "while Out of the Blue does possess the slick, processed dance-pop production and squeaky-clean innocence of most '80s teen pop, it stands out from the competition due to Gibson's talent as a singer, musician, pop songwriter, arranger, and even producer...Gibson's youthful exuberance and energy shine through infectiously...it's some of the best teen pop you're likely to hear."

== Reissues ==
Out of the Blue was included in the 2017 box set We Could Be Together, with six remixes as bonus tracks.

A special four-disc digipack edition was released by Cherry Red Records on October 15, 2021. This release includes two remix CDs and a DVD containing the album's five music videos, the live video Live in Concert: The "Out of the Blue" Tour, and a special interview video.

== Track listing ==
All tracks are written by Deborah Gibson, except where indicated.

Side A
No.	Title	Producer(s)	Length
1.	"Out of the Blue"	Fred Zarr; Gibson	3:55
2.	"Staying Together"	Zarr; Gibson	4:07
3.	"Only in My Dreams"	Zarr	3:54
4.	"Foolish Beat"	Gibson	4:25
5.	"Red Hot"	John Morales; Sergio Munzibai	3:54
Total length:			20:16

Side B
No.	Title	Producer(s)	Length
6.	"Wake Up to Love"	Zarr; Gibson	3:42
7.	"Shake Your Love"	Zarr	3:44
8.	"Fallen Angel"	Zarr	3:43
9.	"Play the Field"	Lewis A. Martineé	4:37
10.	"Between the Lines"	Morales; Munzibai	4:42
Total length:			20:32

Deluxe Digipack Edition bonus tracks
No.	Title	Length
11.	"Only in My Dreams" (Vocal Mix)	3:56
12.	"Only in My Dreams" (Dreamix)	4:18
13.	"Shake Your Love" (Bad Dubb Version)	5:05
14.	"Foolish Beat" (Extended Mix)	6:47
15.	"Staying Together" (Dub Edit)	4:35
Total length:		24:43

Deluxe Digipack Edition Disc 2: The Remixes Part 1
No.	Title	Length
1.	"Only in My Dreams" (Extended Club Mix)	6:36
2.	"Only in My Dreams" (Dub)	4:44
3.	"Only in My Dreams" (Percapella/Vocal)	3:32
4.	"Only in My Dreams" (Heartthrob Beats)	4:18
5.	"Shake Your Love" (Vocal/Club Mix)	5:52
6.	"Shake Your Love" (Bonus Beats)	6:32
7.	"Shake Your Love" (Vocal/Bassapella)	3:35
8.	"Shake Your Love" (Shake the House Version)	5:49
9.	"Out of the Blue" (Vocal/Club Mix)	5:52
10.	"Out of the Blue" (Bonus Beats)	4:20
Total length:		51:15

Deluxe Digipack Edition Disc 3: The Remixes Part 2
No.	Title	Length
1.	"Out of the Blue" (Drumapella)	4:08
2.	"Out of the Blue" (Dub Version)	3:57
3.	"Shake Your Love" (Live)	7:47
4.	"Foolish Beat" (Instrumental Version)	4:28
5.	"Only in My Dreams" (Dream House Mix)	10:07
6.	"Medley" (Debbie Gibson Megamix)	7:17
7.	"Staying Together" (Remix)	5:59
8.	"Staying Together" (Dub Version)	5:46
9.	"Staying Together" (Bonus Beats)	1:36
10.	"Staying Together" (LP Version with Vocal Re-cut)	4:22
Total length:		55:32

Deluxe Digipack Edition DVD
No.	Title	Writer(s)	Length
1.	"Only in My Dreams" (Music Video)
2.	"Shake Your Love" (Music Video)
3.	"Out of the Blue" (Music Video)
4.	"Foolish Beat" (Music Video)
5.	"Staying Together" (Music Video)
6.	"Staying Together" (Live)
7.	"Foolish Beat" (Live)
8.	"Shake Your Love" (Live)
9.	"In the Still of the Night" (Live)	Fred Parris
10.	"Lost in Your Eyes" (Live)
11.	"Should've Been the One" (Live)
12.	"Out of the Blue" (Live)
13.	"Only in My Dreams" (Live)
14.	"We Could Be Together" (Live)
15.	"Crocodile Rock" (Live)	Bernie Taupin; Elton John
16.	"Up Close and Personal" (Bonus Interview Featurette)

== Personnel ==
Musicians

- Deborah Gibson – lead and backing vocals, rhythm programs, keyboard, synthesizer, additional keyboards
- Fred Zarr – rhythm programs, keyboards, synthesizer, additional keyboards (tracks 1–4, 6–8)
- John Morales – programming, sequencing (tracks 5, 10)
- David "Jaz" Grant – keyboard overdubs, guitar (tracks 5, 7–8, 10)
- Lewis A. Martineé – rhythm programs, keyboards, backing vocals (track 9)
- Mike Baskt – keyboards (track 9)
- Ira Siegel – guitar, acoustic guitar, electric guitar (tracks 1–4)
- Tommy Williams – guitar, electric guitar (tracks 1, 6)
- Nestor Gomez – guitar (track 9)
- Gary Down – bass (track 3)
- Bashiri Johnson – percussion (tracks 1–4, 6–8)
- Billy Amendola – Tom Tom overdubs (track 3)
- Jimmy Maelen – percussion overdubs (tracks 5, 10)
- Jeff Smith – saxophone, saxophone overdubs, backing vocals (tracks 2–8, 10)
- LaRita Gaskins – backing vocals (tracks 1–3, 6)
- Carrie Johnson – backing vocals (tracks 1–2, 4, 6–8)
- Libby Johnson – backing vocals (tracks 1–2, 6–8)
- Norma Jean Wright – backing vocals (track 3)
- Tim Lawless – backing vocals (track 4)
- Connie Harvey – backing vocals (tracks 5, 10)
- Janet Wright – backing vocals (tracks 5, 10)
- Wendell Morrison – backing vocals (tracks 5, 10)
- Haydee – backing vocals (track 9)

Production

- Debbie Gibson – arranger (tracks 1–4, 6–8); producer (1–2, 4–6)
- Fred Zarr – arranger, mixing (tracks 1–4, 6–8); produced (1–3, 6–8)
- John Morales – arranger, mix engineer, producer (tracks 5, 10)
- Sergio Munzibai – arranger (track 5); producer (5, 10)
- Lewis A. Martineé – arranger, engineer, producer (track 9)
- Don Feinberg – recording engineer (tracks 1–4, 6–8)
- Bernard Bullock – recording engineer (tracks 1–4, 6–8)
- Phil Castellano – recording engineer, mixing (tracks 1–4, 6–8)
- Peter Sturge – recording engineer (tracks 5, 10)
- Billy Esses – assistant engineer (tracks 1–4, 6–8)
- Jim Goatley – assistant mix engineer (tracks 1–2, 4, 6–8)
- Carlos Santos – assistant (track 9)
- Michael Hutchinson – mixing (tracks 2, 6)
- "Little" Louie Vega – mixing (track 3)
- Doc Dougherty – mixing (track 3)
- Douglas Breitbart – executive producer, management (Broadbeard Productions, Inc.)
- Greg Porto – art direction
- Adrian Buckmaster – photography
- Howie Weinberg – mastering (Masterdisk)

== Charts ==
=== Weekly charts ===
Weekly chart performance for Out of the Blue
Chart (1987–2021)	Peak position
Australian Albums (Kent Music Report)	66
Canada Top Albums/CDs (RPM)	22
Dutch Albums (Album Top 100)	41
European Albums (Music & Media)	84
Finnish Albums (Suomen virallinen albumilista)	27
Japanese Albums (Oricon)	75
New Zealand Albums (RMNZ)	23
Scottish Albums (Official Charts)	66
Swedish Albums (Sverigetopplistan)	34
UK Albums (Official Charts)	26
US Billboard 200	7
US Top 200 Albums (Cashbox)	10

=== Year-end charts ===
Chart (1988)	Peak position
US Billboard 200	7

== Certifications and sales ==
Region	Certification	Certified units/sales
Hong Kong (IFPI Hong Kong)	Gold	10,000^{*}
United Kingdom (BPI)	Gold	100,000^{^}
United States (RIAA)	3× Platinum	3,000,000^{^}
Summaries
Worldwide	—	5,000,000
^{*} Sales figures based on certification alone.^{^} Shipments figures based on certification alone.
