= Colored Lights: The Broadway Album =

Studio album by Deborah Gibson
- Released: October 28, 2003
- Studios: Westlake Audio (Los Angeles, California)
- Genres: Musicals; Standards
- Length: 49:38
- Labels: Fynsworth Alley, Varèse Sarabande
- Producers: Deborah Gibson; William Meade

Deborah Gibson chronology
M.Y.O.B. (2001)	Colored Lights: The Broadway Album (2003)	Memory Lane, Volume 1 (2005)

Professional ratings
Review scores
Source	Rating
Allmusic	3/5 stars

Colored Lights: The Broadway Album is the eighth studio album by American singer-songwriter Debbie Gibson. Released on October 28, 2003 on the Fynsworth Alley label, it includes songs from nine pre-existing theatre musicals and one from her own original theatre musical Skirts.

The album was later re-released to streaming services in 2024, under the titles Who Are You Now? and I'm the Greatest Star.

== Reception ==
AllMusic were favourable in their review of the album, commenting that "the track selections are wise, ranging from familiar ("On My Own") to obscure (the upbeat Latin pop song "Raise the Roof"), with traditional and modern imprints stamped according to her taste...The very fine orchestrations are secondary to her vocals, there are no duets, and backup singers are in limited supply. But it works. She is at ease, aims to please, and obviously enjoys every bit of what she's doing. The showstopper "They All Laughed" casts a sweet, frenetic spell and is vocally and instrumentally the highlight of the album—most particularly when she chuckles, rumbles, and squeaks at the finish. There are two things requested of listeners in order to fully enjoy this project: that they be fans of Gibson and fans of theater. If you fit the playbill, you're in luck."

== Track listing ==
No.	Title	Writer(s)	Original musical	Length
1.	"Let Me Entertain You"	Stephen Sondheim; Jule Styne	Gypsy: A Musical Fable	2:14
2.	"Blame It on the Summer Night"	Stephen Schwartz; Charles Strouse	Rags	4:39
3.	"Raise the Roof!"	Andrew Lippa	The Wild Party	3:28
4.	"I'd Rather Leave While I'm in Love"	Peter Allen; Carole Bayer Sager	The Boy from Oz	3:22
5.	"On My Own"	Alain Boublil; Jean-Marc Natel	Les Misérables	4:30
6.	"Colored Lights"	Fred Ebb; John Kander	The Rink	6:06
7.	"I'm the Greatest Star"	Bob Merrill; Styne	Funny Girl	4:09
8.	"Who Are You Now?"	Merrill; Styne	Funny Girl	3:29
9.	"They All Laughed"	Ira Gershwin; George Gershwin	Shall We Dance	2:22
10.	"Sex"	Deborah Gibson	Skirts	2:28
11.	"Maybe This Time"	Ebb; Kander	Cabaret	3:00
12.	"I Enjoy Being a Girl"	Oscar Hammerstein II; Richard Rodgers	Flower Drum Song	4:36
13.	"Anytime (I Am There)"	William Finn	Elegies: A Song Cycle	5:08
Total length:				49:38

== Personnel ==
- Deborah Gibson – lead vocals
- Ron Abel – keyboards, musical director, musical producer, conductor, orchestration (1, 2, 4, 8-10, 12, 13)
- Steve Orich – keyboards (3, 7), orchestration (3, 7)
- Grant Geissman – guitars
- Randy Landas – bass guitar
- Mark Converse – drums, percussion
- Phillip D. Feather – reeds
- Mark Hollingsworth – reeds
- David Stout – trombone
- Dan Fornero – trumpet
- John Fumo – trumpet
- Jean Marinelli – French horn
- John Krovozc – cello
- Alex Rannie – harp
- Novi Novog – viola
- Ruth Bruegger – violin
- Cheryl Ongaro – violin
- Vladimir Polimatidi – violin
- Lanny Meyers – orchestration (5, 6, 11)
- Debra Byrd – backing vocals
- Ray Garcia – backing vocals
- Sylvia MacCalla – backing vocals
- Jerry Sharell – backing vocals

=== Production ===
- Deborah Gibson – producer
- William Meade – producer
- Chris Tergesen – engineer
- Jesse Gorman – assistant engineer
- Gabe Sganga – assistant engineer
- Chris Gehringer – mastering
- Greg Arnold – mastering
- Mark Wilder – mastering
- Mike Brewer – production assistant to William Meade
- Michael Yuen – art direction, package design
- Kevin Merrill – photography
- Joan Marcus – additional photography
