= Only in My Dreams =

1986 single by Debbie Gibson

Single by Debbie Gibson

from the album Out of the Blue
- A-side: "Vocal (3:50)"
- B-side: Dub (4:42) (U.S., 89322; JPN, P-2305); Dreamix (4:18) (UK, A9322)
- Released: December 16, 1986
- Recorded: 1986
- Genre: Freestyle; electropop; bubblegum pop
- Length: 3:53 (Album Version); 3:42 (Single Version)
- Label: Atlantic
- Songwriter: Deborah Gibson
- Producer: Fred Zarr

Debbie Gibson singles chronology
"Only in My Dreams" (1986)	"Shake Your Love" (1987)

Music video
- Only in My Dreams on YouTube

Professional ratings
Review scores
Source	Rating
Number One	4/5 stars

"Only in My Dreams" is the debut single by American singer-songwriter and actress Debbie Gibson, who was 16 years old at the time of its release. The song was officially released by Atlantic Records on December 16, 1986. It was later remixed and re-released in February 1987. The song showcased Gibson's songwriting skills as she solely wrote it, with Fred Zarr producing it.

The song became a sleeper hit, eventually rising to the number four position on the Billboard Hot 100, making Gibson one of the few teenage singers to have a top five hit. While it did not enter the top fifty in the UK upon its original release, "Only in My Dreams" was re-issued in 1988 following the chart success of following single "Shake Your Love", which led it peaking at number eleven. Elsewhere, the song peaked at number five in Canada while entering the top twenty in New Zealand and Ireland.

Gibson has re-recorded the song twice following its release. She first re-recorded it in 1997 for her sixth studio album Deborah (1997), when it was released to clubs in February 1998. She later re-recorded it on her Japan-only ninth studio album Ms. Vocalist (2010), this time recorded in Japanese.

The song was voted 95th on VH1's 100 Greatest Songs of the 80s.

== History ==
The song was written by Gibson in 1984, two years before she recorded it. Produced by Fred Zarr and engineered by Don Feinberg for BiZarr Music, Inc., mixed by "Little" Louie Vega and mastered by Herb "Pump" Powers, the dance-pop song reached No. 4 on the U.S. Billboard Hot 100 singles chart in the summer of 1987. Douglas Breitbart for Broadbeard Productions, Inc. served as executive producer. The Extended Club Mix/Vocal track (6:34) from DM 86744 was excerpted for a dance medley, "Medley: Out of the Blue/Shake Your Love/Only in My Dreams" (Debbie Gibson Mega Mix), that became Track 4 on Atlantic DM 86556 "Foolish Beat." A different mix, "Only in My Dreams" (LP Version/3:54), mastered from the original multi-track for DM 86744, became track 3 on Gibson's debut album Out of the Blue (Atlantic LP 81780), and a further variation, "Only in My Dreams (Dream House Mix/10:03)", was Track 3 on Atlantic DM 86556 "Foolish Beat".

== Critical reception ==
Debbi Voller from Number One named "Only in My Dreams" Single of the Week, stating that "it should be a smasheroonie. I predict this girl to be around for a mighty long time. I mean, if she's writing hits like this now — what's she gonna be doing when she's my age?!"

Billboard stated "newcomer combines the Madonna and Lisa Lisa sounds with a '60s girl-group influence; hook-rich charm makes a natural for pop crossover"

== Music video ==
The accompanying music video for "Only in My Dreams" was recorded as a dream sequence at a beach in Asbury Park, New Jersey, the carousel in the Asbury Park casino (then still in use), and outside the Asbury Park Convention Center. Across the street from the beach is The Stone Pony, where Bruce Springsteen and Bon Jovi got their start. Gibson makes several wardrobe changes during the video, which shows the futility of a teenage girl attempting to get the man of her dreams to look at her, and when he does, she realizes that she was dreaming the whole event, thus causing her world to come crashing down around her.

== Track listing ==
All tracks are written by Deborah Gibson.

7" vinyl single
No.	Title	Length
1.	"Only in My Dreams" (Vocal Mix)	3:50
2.	"Only in My Dreams" (Dub Mix)	4:42

12" vinyl single
No.	Title	Length
1.	"Only in My Dreams" (Extended Club Mix/Vocal)	6:34
2.	"Only in My Dreams" (Percapella/Vocal)	3:29
3.	"Only in My Dreams" (Dreamix/Dub)	4:18
4.	"Only in My Dreams" (Heartthrob Beats)	4:14

== Versions ==
- "Only in my Dreams" [Album Version] – 3:46
- "Only in my Dreams" [97 Dance Remix] – 4:36
- "Only in my Dreams" [Club Dub] – 4:36
- "Only in my Dreams" [Club Mix with Rap] – 4:35
- "Only in my Dreams" [Debbie Dreams] – 4:38
- "Only in my Dreams" [Dream Dub] – 3:44
- "Only in my Dreams" [Extended Club Mix] – 5:55
- "Only in my Dreams" [Extended Dance Mix] – 6:27
- "Only in my Dreams" [Hot Tracks Mix] – 6:27
- "Only in my Dreams" [Rave Radio Version] – 3:44
- "Only in my Dreams" [Riff Dub] – 4:22
- "Only in my Dreams" [Vasquez Club Mix] – 7:30
- "Only in my Dreams" [Video Version] – 3:42

== Charts ==
=== Weekly charts ===
Chart (1987–1988)	Peak position
Canada Top Singles (RPM)	6
Europe (Eurochart Hot 100)	37
Ireland (IRMA)	20
Israel (Israeli Singles Chart)	8
Italy (Musica e dischi)	18
Italy Airplay (Music & Media)	8
Luxembourg (Radio Luxembourg)	11
Netherlands (Dutch Top 40)	46
New Zealand (Recorded Music NZ)	20
Quebec (ADISQ)	20
UK Singles (Official Charts)	11
UK Dance Chart (Music Week)	10
US Billboard Hot 100	4
US Dance Club Songs (Billboard)	12
US Dance Singles Sales (Billboard)	4
US Adult Contemporary (Billboard)	31
US Cash Box Top 100	6

=== Year-end charts ===
Chart (1987)	Rank
Canada	39
US Billboard Hot 100	26
US Cash Box Top 100	47

== Certifications ==
Region	Certification	Certified units/sales
United States (RIAA)	Gold	500,000^{^}
^{^} Shipments figures based on certification alone.

== 1997/98 re-recording ==
"Only in My Dreams 1998"

Single by Deborah Gibson

from the album Deborah Rev. 1.1
- Released: 1998
- Recorded: 1997
- Genre: Dance-pop
- Length: 37:53 overall
- Label: Jellybean Recordings
- Songwriter: Deborah Gibson
- Producers: John "Jellybean" Benitez; Deborah Gibson

Deborah Gibson singles chronology
"Moonchild" (1997)	"Only in My Dreams 1998" (1998)	"Naturally" (1998)

In 1997, Gibson re-recorded the song as "Only in My Dreams" (1997 Dance Edit/4:38), track 14 on her 1997 album Deborah, Revision 1.1 for June 1997. She later released this version in seven variations, including one with a retrofitted eight-measure rap, on Jellybean Recordings DM 2532 'Only in My Dreams 1998' (released February 1998). The basic rhythm is modified from the Dream House Version of the original song.

=== Track listing ===
No.	Title	Length
1.	"Only in My Dreams 1998" (Club Mix)	7:32
2.	"Only in My Dreams 1998" (Club Mix with Rap)	4:37
3.	"Only in My Dreams 1998" (Club Dub)	4:36
4.	"Only in My Dreams 1998" (Rave Vocal Mix)	4:37
5.	"Only in My Dreams 1998" (Rave Dub)	4:37
6.	"Only in My Dreams 1998" (Dream Dub)	3:45
7.	"Only in My Dreams 1998" (Rave Radio Edit)	3:46
8.	"Only in My Dreams 1998" (Riff Dub)	4:23
Total length:		37:53
