= Lost in Your Eyes =

1989 single by Debbie Gibson

Single by Debbie Gibson

from the album Electric Youth
- B-side: "Silence Speaks (a Thousand Words)"
- Released: January 6, 1989
- Recorded: 1988
- Genre: Pop
- Length: 3:34 (album version); 3:51 (video version)
- Label: Atlantic
- Songwriter: Deborah Gibson
- Producer: Deborah Gibson

Debbie Gibson singles chronology
"Staying Together" (1988)	"Lost in Your Eyes" (1989)	"Electric Youth" (1989)

Music video
- "Lost in Your Eyes" on YouTube

"Lost in Your Eyes" is a song by American singer-songwriter Debbie Gibson, released as the first single from her second album, Electric Youth (1989). It was first released to radio on January 3, 1989, before being officially released on January 6.

== Chart performance ==
Released on January 6, 1989, "Lost in Your Eyes" debuted at No. 42 on the US Billboard Hot 100 on the week of January 21. On March 4, the ballad climbed to number one and remained there for three weeks, becoming her most successful single and her fifth and last top 10 hit. In Canada, it also reached number one for three weeks, and outside North America, "Lost in Your Eyes" experienced moderate chart success, reaching number seven in Australia and the top 40 in Belgium, Ireland, Spain, and the United Kingdom.

== Critical reception ==
Bryan Buss from AllMusic complimented the song as "a pretty ballad that showcases her songwriting skills, her clear voice, and her talent on the piano." A reviewer from People Magazine stated that Gibson "fares well with torchy ballads" such as "Lost in Your Eyes". Betty Page from Record Mirror wrote, "Golden-larynxed Debs hits us with the big moodsome ballad, proving that she's shaping up to be the Barry Manilow of the Nineties. She's obviously trying to shed the popcorn and candyfloss image already, but she's a bit too Minnie Mouse to carry off the sweeping epic just yet. Still, we all had a bit of a weep over the tinkly piano." William Shaw from Smash Hits felt that "she is crooning along to this creaky ballad that some ageing songstress like Elaine Paige or Elkie Brooks would feel comfortable with."

== Music video ==
The music video opens with Gibson playing the piano. She sings while wearing a hat and looking at the camera. Clips of her dancing with a man play throughout. It was directed by James Yukich and debuted to VH1 on January 21, 1989.

== Re-recordings ==
In 2006, Gibson rearranged the song with Tim and Ryan O'Neill for the O'Neill Brothers album Someone You Love. In 2010, Gibson re-recorded the song in both English and Japanese as extra tracks for the Japan-exclusive album Ms. Vocalist. In 2018, Gibson re-recorded the song as "Lost in Your Eyes (Dream Wedding Mix)" for the Hallmark Channel original film Wedding of Dreams.

A duet version with Joey McIntyre is featured in Gibson's 2021 album The Body Remembers. This version was first performed live during New Kids on the Block's Mixtape Tour in 2019.

== Track listing ==
All tracks are written by Deborah Gibson.

No.	Title	Length
1.	"Lost in Your Eyes"	3:34
2.	"Silence Speaks (a Thousand Words)" (Acoustic Mix)	3:39

== Charts ==
=== Weekly charts ===
Chart (1989)	Peak position
Australia (ARIA)	7
Belgium (Ultratop 50 Flanders)	34
Brazil (ABPD)	3
Canada Retail Singles (The Record)	5
Canada Top Singles (RPM)	1
Europe (Eurochart Hot 100)	93
Finland (Suomen virallinen lista)	22
Iceland (Dagblaðið Vísir)	4
Ireland (IRMA)	18
Italy Airplay (Music & Media)	4
Japan (Tokio Hot 100)	1
Netherlands (Single Top 100)	45
New Zealand (Recorded Music NZ)	44
Spain (AFYVE)	34
UK Singles (Official Charts)	34
US Billboard Hot 100	1
US Adult Contemporary (Billboard)	3
US Cash Box Top 100	1
US Contemporary Hit Radio (Radio & Records)	1
US Adult Contemporary (Radio & Records)	3
Quebec (ADISQ)	1

=== Year-end charts ===
Chart (1989)	Position
Australia (ARIA)	27
Canada Top Singles (RPM)	7
US Billboard Hot 100	13
US Cash Box Top 100	14
US Contemporary Hit Radio (Radio & Records)	7
US Adult Contemporary (Radio & Records)	27
US Top 40 (Gavin Report)	4
US Adult Contemporary (Gavin Report)	11

== Certifications ==
Region	Certification	Certified units/sales
Australia (ARIA)	Gold	35,000^{^}
United States (RIAA)	Gold	500,000^{^}
^{^} Shipments figures based on certification alone.

== Covers ==
- Filipino acoustic band Nyoy Volante & The Mannos covered the song on their 2006 self-titled album.
- Filipina singer Sarah Geronimo did a cover of the song for her album Music and Me in 2009.
- Japanese singer Nana Mizuki did an acoustic rendition of the song on the January 29, 2017, episode of MTV Unplugged.
- Kelly Clarkson covered the song on an episode of The Kelly Clarkson Show in 2021.
