= Foolish Beat =

1988 single by Debbie Gibson

Single by Debbie Gibson

from the album Out of the Blue
- B-side: "Foolish Beat" (instrumental)
- Released: March 25, 1988
- Length: 4:22
- Label: Atlantic
- Songwriter: Deborah Gibson
- Producer: Deborah Gibson

Debbie Gibson singles chronology
"Out of the Blue" (1988)	"Foolish Beat" (1988)	"Staying Together" (1988)

Music video
- Foolish Beat on YouTube

"Foolish Beat" is a song by American singer-songwriter Debbie Gibson, released as the fourth single from her debut album, Out of the Blue (1987), in March 1988, by Atlantic Records. The single topped the US Billboard Hot 100 on June 25, 1988, giving Gibson the then-record for the youngest person to write, produce, and perform a number-one single entirely on her own, at age 17. The record was surpassed in 2007 by Soulja Boy with "Crank That (Soulja Boy)". Gibson, however, remains the youngest female artist to hold the mark.

In the United Kingdom, "Foolish Beat" reached number nine on the UK Singles Chart. The song also reached the top five in Canada and Ireland and the top 10 in the Netherlands and Switzerland. The single was released in Japan as the B-side to "Out of the Blue" on Atlantic Japan 10SW-15. In 2010, Gibson re-recorded the song as an extra track for the Deluxe Edition release of the Japan-exclusive album Ms. Vocalist.

== Critical reception ==
Cash Box praised the song, stating "here Debbie slows it down and delivers a heartfelt ballad that really builds and emotes. From her smash LP Out Of The Blue, she produces a very clean track that allows her to stretch out vocally without interference. This is a winner for Gibson, and should continue the phenomenal success of this very talented and winning young woman."

Pan-European magazine Music & Media described "Foolish Beat" as "a moody mid-tempo song, self written and self-produced in a classy, sophisticated style. After a few hearings it certainly sticks in your head."

== Music video ==
In the music video for "Foolish Beat", Gibson typecasts herself as a young performer who recently broke up with her boyfriend; although she now regrets jilting him and wants to make amends, he brushes off her efforts to do so. The video ends with him debating about seeing her show having brought a bouquet of flowers for her; he drops the flowers in a trash can deciding that he did not want to get hurt again, then walks off into the distance.

The music video was shot in New York City and directed by Nick Willing, who directed music videos for bands such as Eurythmics, Bob Geldof, Swing Out Sister, and others. Some scenes were shot at South Street Seaport during Saint Patrick's Day in March 1988. The outfit Gibson wore belonged to her elder sister Michele.

== Track listings ==
All tracks are written by Deborah Gibson.

7-inch and cassette single
No.	Title	Length
1.	"Foolish Beat"	4:20
2.	"Fallen Angel" (Vocal)	3:42

- The US 7-inch single sleeve lists the instrumental of "Foolish Beat" as the B-side, but "Fallen Angel" is on the label and pressed vinyl.

12-inch single
No.	Title	Length
1.	"Foolish Beat" (extended mix)	6:46
2.	"Foolish Beat" (instrumental)	4:28
3.	"Only in My Dreams" (Dream House mix)	10:03
4.	"Medley: Out of the Blue/Shake Your Love/Only in My Dreams" (Debbie Gibson mega mix)	7:13

== Charts ==
=== Weekly charts ===
Chart (1988)	Peak position
Australia (ARIA)	60
Belgium (Ultratop 50 Flanders)	20
Canada Retail Singles (The Record)	1
Canada Top Singles (RPM)	2
Canada Adult Contemporary (RPM)	8
Europe (Eurochart Hot 100)	28
Finland (Suomen virallinen lista)	16
Ireland (IRMA)	5
Israel (Israeli Singles Chart)	26
Italy Airplay (Music & Media)	12
Luxembourg (Radio Luxembourg)	6
Netherlands (Dutch Top 40)	8
Netherlands (Single Top 100)	7
New Zealand (Recorded Music NZ)	29
Quebec (ADISQ)	1
South Africa (Springbok Radio)	26
Spain (AFYVE)	36
Switzerland (Schweizer Hitparade)	10
UK Singles (Official Charts)	9
US Billboard Hot 100	1
US Adult Contemporary (Billboard)	8
US Dance Singles Sales (Billboard)	31
US Cash Box Top 100	1

=== Year-end charts ===
Chart (1988)	Position
Belgium (Ultratop 50 Flanders)	94
Canada Top Singles (RPM)	32
Netherlands (Dutch Top 40)	68
Netherlands (Single Top 100)	75
US Billboard Hot 100	32

== Release history ==
Region	Date	Format(s)	Label(s)	Ref.
Japan	March 25, 1988	Mini-CD	Atlantic	
United States	April 11, 1988	7-inch vinyl; 12-inch vinyl; cassette	Atlantic	
United Kingdom	June 27, 1988	7-inch vinyl; 12-inch vinyl	Atlantic	

== Cover versions ==
- Saho Nozaki recorded a Japanese-language cover of the song titled "Nemurenu Yoru wo Sugite" (眠れぬ夜を過ぎて; "After a Sleepless Night") in 1988.
- Voices of Extreme recorded a metal cover of the song, with the music video featuring Gibson herself.
