= Staying Together (song) =

1988 single by Debbie Gibson

Single by Debbie Gibson

from the album Out of the Blue
- B-side: "Red Hot"
- Released: September 25, 1988
- Genre: Hi-NRG
- Length: 4:07 (album version); 4:15 (single version)
- Label: Atlantic
- Songwriter: Deborah Gibson
- Producers: Deborah Gibson; Fred Zarr

Debbie Gibson singles chronology
"Foolish Beat" (1988)	"Staying Together" (1988)	"Lost in Your Eyes" (1988)

Music video
- Staying Together on YouTube

"Staying Together" is the fifth single from American singer-songwriter-actress Debbie Gibson, and the fifth released in support of her album Out of the Blue. However, it did not perform as well as any of the previous singles, stalling at No. 22 on the Billboard Hot 100. The single reached No. 53 in the UK in 1988. Written by Gibson and originally co-produced and co-arranged with Fred Zarr, this track was edited and co-produced for the single by then-BiZarr Music engineer-understudy Phil Castellano.

Cash Box said that Gibson "rocks out using a pulsating, throbbing base line under a bubble-pop, yet catchy tune."

== Track listing ==
All tracks are written by Deborah Gibson.

7" vinyl single/cassette single
No.	Title	Length
1.	"Staying Together" (Vocal Mix)	4:15
2.	"Staying Together" (Dub Edit)	4:30

12" vinyl single
No.	Title	Length
1.	"Staying Together" (Club Mix)	6:01
2.	"Staying Together" (Dub Version)	5:56
3.	"Staying Together" (Bonus Beats)	1:35

== Remixes ==
- Staying Together [LP Version] 4:07
- Staying Together [Video Version] 4:23
- Staying Together [Bonus Beats] 1:31
- Staying Together [Dub Version] 5:56
- Staying Together [LP Version With Vocal Re-Cut] 4:15
- Staying Together [Club Mix] 5:57

== Weekly charts ==
Chart (1988)	Peak position
Canada Top Singles (RPM)	27
Ireland (IRMA)	15
Spain Radio	40
UK Singles (Official Charts)	53
US Billboard Hot 100	22
US Cash Box Top 100	24
Quebec (ADISQ)	13

== Release history ==
Region	Date	Format(s)	Label(s)	Ref.
Japan	September 25, 1988	Mini-CD	Atlantic	
United Kingdom	October 3, 1988	—N/a	Atlantic	
