= Shake Your Love =

Single by Debbie Gibson

from the album Out of the Blue
- B-side: "Wake Up to Love" (UK)
- Released: September 1987
- Length: 3:43
- Label: Atlantic
- Songwriter: Deborah Gibson
- Producer: Fred Zarr

Debbie Gibson singles chronology
"Only in My Dreams" (1986)	"Shake Your Love" (1987)	"Out of the Blue" (1988)

Music video
- Shake Your Love on YouTube

"Shake Your Love" is a song by American singer-songwriter and actress Debbie Gibson. The song was released as the second single from her debut studio album, Out of the Blue (1987), and the first internationally by Atlantic Records in September 1987. Like the rest of the album, the song was solely written by Gibson and produced by Fred Zarr. The song features the Roland TR-808.

"Shake Your Love" reached number four on the US Billboard Hot 100 in December 1987, giving Gibson her second consecutive top-five hit. The song was also her breakthrough in the UK, peaking at number seven on the UK Singles Chart to become her highest-charting entry. "Shake Your Love" also entered the top 10 in Ireland, where it reached number three.

The music video to support this single, eventually included on Gibson's video album Out of the Blue, was set on a facsimile of a drive-in movie theater lot and choreographed by Paula Abdul. In 2010, Gibson re-recorded the song as an extra track for the deluxe release of the Japan-exclusive album Ms. Vocalist.

== Background ==
Originally recorded in early 1987, the song is written by Gibson and produced by Fred Zarr and engineered by Don Feinberg for BiZarr Music, Inc., with Douglas Breitbart as executive producer.

== Critical reception ==
Reviewer of American magazine Cash Box called Gibson "multi-talented teen" and expressed an assurance that "this upbeat, playful number" that "sounds like a smash" will "completely saturate" radio airwaves.

== Track listings ==
All tracks are written by Deborah Gibson.

7-inch vinyl single
No.	Title	Length
1.	"Shake Your Love" (vocal mix)	3:46
2.	"Shake Your Love" (Bad Dubb version)	5:03

12-inch vinyl single
No.	Title	Length
1.	"Shake Your Love" (Vocal club mix)	5:53
2.	"Shake Your Love" (Bonus Beats)	6:52
3.	"Shake Your Love" (vocal/LP version)	3:37
4.	"Shake Your Love" (Badd Dub version)	4:55
5.	"Shake Your Love" (Vocal/Bassapella)	3:25
6.	"Shake Your Love" (Shake the House Version)	5:48

== Charts ==
=== Weekly charts ===
Chart (1987–1988)	Peak position
Australia (Australian Music Report)	27
Belgium (Ultratop 50 Flanders)	20
Canada Top Singles (RPM)	15
Denmark (IFPI)	15
Europe (Eurochart Hot 100)	25
Ireland (IRMA)	3
Israel (Israeli Singles Chart)	14
Italy (Musica e dischi)	14
Luxembourg (Radio Luxembourg)	6
Netherlands (Dutch Top 40)	24
Netherlands (Single Top 100)	35
New Zealand (Recorded Music NZ)	36
Quebec (ADISQ)	19
Spain Radio (AFYVE)	39
Switzerland (Schweizer Hitparade)	19
UK Singles (Official Charts)	7
UK Dance Chart (Music Week)	5
US Billboard Hot 100	4
US Dance Club Songs (Billboard)	6
US Dance Singles Sales (Billboard)	1
US Cash Box Top 100	5

=== Year-end charts ===
Chart (1988)	Position
US Billboard Hot 100	22
US 12-inch Singles Sales (Billboard)	7

== Certifications ==
Region	Certification	Certified units/sales
United States (RIAA)	Gold	500,000^{^}
^{^} Shipments figures based on certification alone.
