= Out of the Blue (Debbie Gibson song) =

1988 single by Debbie Gibson

Single by Debbie Gibson

from the album Out of the Blue
- Released: April 25, 1988 (UK)
- Recorded: July 1987
- Genre: Pop; electropop; synthpop
- Length: 3:55
- Label: Atlantic
- Songwriter: Deborah Gibson
- Producers: Deborah Gibson; Fred Zarr

Debbie Gibson singles chronology
"Shake Your Love" (1987)	"Out of the Blue" (1988)	"Foolish Beat" (1988)

Music video
- "Out of the Blue" on YouTube

"Out of the Blue" is a song by American singer-songwriter-actress Debbie Gibson, and is the title track of her debut studio album Out of the Blue (1987). It was released on January 8, 1988 in the United States as the third single from the album. The song was written and co-produce by Gibson, with Fred Zarr providing extra production.

"Out of the Blue" gave Gibson her then-highest charting single in the United States, hitting number three on the Billboard Hot 100. The song did not do as well as her previous two singles in the United Kingdom however, stopping at number 19. Gibson re-recorded the song as an extra track for the deluxe edition release of her 2010 Japan-exclusive album Ms. Vocalist. In 2022, the song was featured in episode 2 of HBO's The Staircase.

== Critical reception ==
Cash Box called it a "catchy, hooky hit from one of the most exciting young (sweet sixteen) performers of pop music" that "is filled with the 'ear candy' that marks a great commercial record."

== Track listings ==
All songs written by Deborah Gibson

Standard vinyl single

1. "Out of the Blue" – 3:55
2. "Out of the Blue" (Dub Edit/Edited Dub) – 4:12

Filipino vinyl single

1. "Out of the Blue" – 3:55
2. "Wake Up to Love" – 3:42

US cassette maxi-single/maxi-vinyl single

1. "Out of the Blue" (Club Mix) – 5:50
2. "Out of the Blue" (Bonus Beats) – 4:20
3. "Out of the Blue" (Drumapella) – 4:05
4. "Out of the Blue" (Dub Version) – 3:54

European mini-CD single

1. "Out of the Blue" – 3:57
2. "Fallen Angel" – 3:46
3. "Shake Your Love" – 3:44
4. "Out of the Blue" (Extended Version) – 5:47

UK vinyl single

1. "Out of the Blue" – 3:55
2. "Fallen Angel" – 3:43

Japanese vinyl single

1. "Out of the Blue" – 3:55
2. "Foolish Beat" – 4:25

== Charts ==
=== Weekly charts ===
Chart (1988)	Peak position
Australia (ARIA)	68
Canada Top Singles (RPM)	15
Europe (Eurochart Hot 100)	62
Ireland (IRMA)	19
Israel (Israeli Singles Chart)	18
Netherlands (Dutch Top 40)	88
Panamá (UPI)	2
Spain (Spain Top 40 Radio)	32
UK Singles (Official Charts)	19
US Adult Contemporary (Billboard)	16
US Billboard Hot 100	3
US Dance Club Songs (Billboard)	44
US Dance Singles Sales (Billboard)	1
US Top 100 Pop Singles (Cashbox)	5
US Contemporary Hit Radio (Radio & Records)	3
US Top 40 (Gavin Report)	3
Luxembourg (Radio Luxembourg)	14
Quebec (ADISQ)	9

=== Year-end charts ===
Chart (1988)	Position
US Billboard Hot 100 (Billboard)	54
US Contemporary Hit Radio (Radio & Records)	33
US Top 40 (Gavin Report)	27
US Adult Contemporary (Gavin Report)	97
