= Village People discography =

Albums, singles, and other releases by American disco group Village People

- Studio albums: 10
- Compilation albums: 14
- Singles: 34
- Video albums: 5
- Music videos: 14
- Box sets: 1

This is the discography of American disco group Village People.

== Albums ==
=== Studio albums ===
Title	Album details	Peak chart positions										Certifications (sales thresholds)
Title	Album details	US	US R&B	AUS	CAN	JPN	NL	NZ	NOR	SWE	UK	Certifications (sales thresholds)
Village People	Released: July 11, 1977; Label: Casablanca; Formats: LP, MC, 8-track	54	36	21	70	88	—	—	—	29	—	AUS: Gold; CAN: Platinum; US: Gold
Macho Man	Released: February 27, 1978; Label: Casablanca; Formats: LP, MC, 8-track	24	31	5	21	—	—	—	—	37	—	AUS: Gold; CAN: 3× Platinum; US: Platinum
Cruisin'	Released: September 25, 1978; Label: Casablanca; Formats: LP, MC, 8-track	3	5	16	2	27	6	6	5	3	24	AUS: Gold; CAN: 4× Platinum; FRA: Gold; GER: Gold; NED: Gold; US: Platinum
Go West	Released: March 26, 1979; Label: Casablanca; Formats: LP, MC, 8-track	8	14	8	2	18	8	28	4	7	14	AUS: Gold; CAN: 3× Platinum; FRA: Gold; UK: Gold; US: Platinum
Live and Sleazy	Released: September 20, 1979; Label: Casablanca; Formats: 2xLP, 2xMC, 8-track	32	57	69	23	80	—	—	13	25	—	CAN: Platinum; US: Gold
Can't Stop the Music	Released: May 20, 1980; Label: Casablanca; Formats: LP, MC, 8-track	47	—	1	—	36	20	4	17	35	9	AUS: Platinum
Renaissance	Released: June 1981; Label: RCA (US), Casablanca (Japan)	138	—	12	—	—	—	34	—	—	—	
Fox on the Box	Released: July 1, 1982; Label: RCA (Australia), Metronome (Germany), Casablanca (Japan), No UK or US release; Formats: LP, MC	—	—	—	—	—	—	—	—	—	—	
Sex Over the Phone	Released: July 1985; Label: Black Scorpio, Record Shack; Formats: CD, LP, MC	—	—	—	—	—	—	—	—	47	—	
A Village People Christmas	Released: November 27, 2018; Label: Ceres; Formats: CD, digital download; Re-released in 2019 with two additional tracks as Magical Christmas	—	—	—	—	—	—	—	—	—	—	
"—" denotes releases that did not chart or were not released in that territory.

=== Compilation albums ===
Title	Album details	Peak chart positions			
Title	Album details	AUS	NZ	SWE	UK
I Am What I Am – The Best of Village People	Released: March 1979; Label: Telefunken; Formats: LP, MC; Germany and Sweden-only release	—	—	19	—
Non Stop	Released: November 1981; Label: RCA; Formats: LP, MC; Australia and New Zealand-only release	42	—	—	—
Greatest Hits Volume One and Two	Released: 1983; Label: J&B; Formats: 2xLP, 2xMC; Australia-only release	15	—	—	—
Greatest Hits	Released: November 1988; Label: Rhino; Formats: CD, LP, MC	—	—	—	—
Greatest Hits Remix	Released: 1989; Label: Groove & Move, BCM; Formats: CD, LP, MC	—	—	—	—
The Greatest Hits of Boney M and the Village People (with Boney M)	Released: October 1990; Label: Concept; Formats: CD, LP; Australia-only release	68	—	—	—
The Best of Village People	Released: November 1993; Label: Arista/BMG; Formats: CD, MC	31	13	12	72
The Best of Village People	Released: March 22, 1994; Label: Casablanca; Formats: CD	—	—	—	—
We Want You	Released: January 1998; Label: Scorpio Music, Columbia; Formats: CD	—	—	38	—
Greatest Hits	Released: November 1999; Label: Wrasse; Formats: CD, MC; UK-only release	—	—	—	118
20th Century Masters: The Millennium Collection: The Best of Village People	Released: August 21, 2001; Label: Mercury; Formats: CD	—	—	—	—
100%	Released: July 2002; Label: Mariann; Formats: CD; Scandinavia-only release	—	—	19	—
Icon	Released: June 3, 2014; Label: Mercury; Formats: CD	—	—	—	—
Gold	Released: November 15, 2019; Label: Crimson; Formats: 3xCD, LP	—	—	—	66
"—" denotes releases that did not chart or were not released in that territory.

=== Box sets ===
Title	Album details
The Album Collection 1977–1985	Released: March 20, 2020; Label: Edsel; Formats: 10xCD

== Singles ==
Title	Year	Peak chart positions										Certifications (sales thresholds)	Album
Title	Year	US	US Dance	AUS	BEL (FL)	CAN	GER	JPN	NL	NZ	UK	Certifications (sales thresholds)	Album
"San Francisco (You've Got Me)"	1977	102	1 (Note: "San Francisco" and "In Hollywood" jointly topped the National Disco Action Top 40 along with "Fire Island", as cuts from the album Village People.)	15	— (Note: "San Francisco" didn't enter the Ultratop Flanders Top 30, but it did peak at number 47 on the Ultratop Wallonia Top 50.)	—	—	40	—	—	45		Village People
"Macho Man"	1978	25	4 (Note: "Macho Man" and "I Am What I Am" jointly charted on the National Disco Action Top 40 along with "Key West", as cuts from the album Macho Man.)	3	—	16	—	41	—	7	—	AUS: Gold; US: Gold	Macho Man
"In Hollywood (Everybody Is a Star)" (Note: Only released in France and Mexico. However, it did chart in the Netherlands, which would have been likely due to import sales.)	1978	—	1	—	—	—	—	—	27	—	—		Village People
"Just a Gigolo/I Ain't Got Nobody" (medley) (Note: Only released in the UK)	1978	—	—	—	—	—	—	—	—	—	—		Macho Man
"Y.M.C.A."	1978	2	2 (Note: "Y.M.C.A." charted on the National Disco Action Top 40 with "Hot Cop", as cuts from the album Cruisin.)	1	1	1	1	10	1	1	1	GER: Gold; NED: Platinum; NZ: 2× Platinum; UK: Platinum; US: 3× Platinum	Cruisin'
"I Am What I Am" (Note: Only released in the UK, Germany and Turkey.)	1978	—	4	—	—	—	32	—	—	—	—		Macho Man
"In the Navy"	1979	3	14 (Note: "In the Navy" and "Go West" jointly charted on the National Disco Action Top 40 along with "Manhattan Woman", as cuts from the album Go West.)	7	1	1	3	10	1	7	2	UK: Silver; US: Gold	Go West
"Go West"	1979	45	14	—	12	41	—	43	29	—	15		Go West
"I Wanna Shake Your Hand" (Note: Only released in South Africa and Rhodesia.)	1979	—	—	—	—	—	—	—	—	—	—		Go West
"Sleazy"	1979	—	26	—	—	—	—	76	—	—	—		Live and Sleazy
"Ready for the 80's"	1979	52	26	—	—	—	—	—	—	—	—		Live and Sleazy
"Can't Stop the Music"	1980	—	27	1	7	—	10	36	—	2	11		Can't Stop the Music
"Magic Night"	1980	—	—	88	—	—	—	88	—	—	—		Can't Stop the Music
"Do You Wanna Spend the Night"	1981	—	—	48	—	—	—	—	—	—	—		Renaissance
"5 O'Clock in the Morning"	1981	—	—	—	—	—	—	—	—	—	—		Renaissance
"Fireman" (Note: Only released in Japan)	1981	—	—	—	—	—	—	—	—	—	—		Renaissance
"Action Man"	1981	—	—	—	—	—	—	—	—	—	—		Renaissance
"Fox on the Box"	1982	—	—	—	—	—	—	—	—	—	—		Fox on the Box
"Play Bach" (Note: Only released in Germany, France and Australia.)	1982	—	—	—	—	—	—	—	—	—	—		Fox on the Box
"America" (Note: Only released in Australia and New Zealand.)	1983	—	—	—	—	—	—	—	—	—	—		Non-album single
"Sex Over the Phone"	1985	—	—	—	—	—	40	—	—	—	59		Sex Over the Phone
"New York City"	1985	—	—	—	—	—	—	—	—	—	97		Sex Over the Phone
"Medley 1985" (Note: Only released in the UK, Greece and Sweden.)	1985	—	—	—	—	—	—	—	—	—	91		Non-album singles
"Livin' in the Wildlife" (Note: Only released in Australia.)	1988	—	—	—	—	—	—	—	—	—	—		Non-album singles
"Megamix"	1989	—	—	—	14	—	—	—	—	—	—		Greatest Hits Remix
"Y.M.C.A" ('93 remix)	1993	—	—	76	—	—	96	—	—	46	12		The Best of Village People
"In the Navy" ('94 remix)	1994	—	—	—	—	—	—	—	—	42	36		The Best of Village People
"Far Away in America" (with die Deutsche Fußballnationalmannschaft) (Note: Only released in Germany.)	1994	—	—	—	—	—	44	—	—	—	—		Far Away in America
"We Want You – The 1998 Megamix"	1998	—	—	92	—	—	—	—	—	—	—		We Want You
"Y.M.C.A." ('99 Millennium Mix)	1999	—	—	—	—	—	—	—	—	—	35		Greatest Hits
"Let's Go Back to the Dance Floor"	2013	—	—	—	—	—	—	—	—	—	—		Non-album single
"A Very Merry Christmas to You"	2018	—	—	—	—	—	—	—	—	—	—		A Village People Christmas
"If You Believe"	2020	— (Note: "If You Believe" didn't enter the Billboard Hot 100, but did peak at number 25 on the Adult Contemporary.)	—	—	—	—	—	—	—	—	—		A Village People Christmas
"My Agenda" (Dorian Electra featuring Village People and Pussy Riot)	2020	—	—	—	—	—	—	—	—	—	—		My Agenda
"—" denotes releases that did not chart or were not released in that territory.

== Videography ==
=== Video albums ===
Title	Album details
En concert	Released: 1989; Label: Proserpine; Formats: VHS; France-only release
The Best Of	Released: 1993; Label: Wienerworld Presentation; Formats: VHS; Australia-only release
Village People DVD	Released: 2002; Label: Brioche Edizioni Musicali; Formats: DVD; Italy-only release
Can't Stop the Music	Released: 2006; Label: Le Studio Canal+; Formats: DVD; France-only release
Les rois du disco	Released: April 29, 2008; Label: Scorpio Music; Formats: 2xDVD; France-only release

=== Music videos ===
Year	Title	Director	Album
1977	"In Hollywood (Everybody Is a Star)"	Unknown	Village People
1977	"San Francisco (You've Got Me)"	Julie Kavner	Village People
1978	"Macho Man"	Julie Kavner	Macho Man
1978	"Y.M.C.A."	Julie Kavner	Cruisin'
1979	"In the Navy"	Julie Kavner	Go West
1979	"Go West"	Julie Kavner	Go West
1979	"Ready for the 80's"	Unknown	Live and Sleazy
1979	"Sleazy"	Unknown	Live and Sleazy
1981	"5 O'Clock in the Morning"	Unknown	Renaissance
1981	"Do You Wanna Spend the Night"	Steve Kahn	Renaissance
1985	"Sex Over the Phone"	Julie Kavner	Sex Over the Phone
1996	"In the Navy" (from the movie Down Periscope)	Unknown	non-album
2013	"Let's Go Back to the Dance Floor"	Unknown	non-album
2022	"Magic Christmas"	Unknown	non-album
