= Electric Youth =

Electric Youth may refer to:

- Electric Youth (band), a Canadian synthpop duo
- Electric Youth (album), a 1989 album by Debbie Gibson
  - "Electric Youth" (song)
- Electric Youth (fragrance)
