= No More Rhyme =

Single by Debbie Gibson

from the album Electric Youth
- B-side: "Over the Wall (Dub Version)"
- Released: June 2, 1989
- Recorded: 1988
- Genre: Pop
- Length: 4:13
- Label: Atlantic
- Songwriter: Deborah Gibson
- Producer: Fred Zarr

Debbie Gibson singles chronology
| "Electric Youth" (1988) | "No More Rhyme" (1989) | "We Could Be Together" (1989) |

Music video
- "No More Rhyme" on YouTube

"No More Rhyme" is a song written and performed by American singer-songwriter and actress Debbie Gibson. It was released as the third single from her second studio album Electric Youth (1989) in North America, Australia, and Japan. It was produced by Fred Zarr.

The song had moderate success, peaking at number 17 on the Billboard Hot 100 and number 13 on the Adult Contemporary chart. Internationally, the song entered the charts in Canada, Australia, and the Flanders region in Belgium.

== Content ==
According to the sheet music published on Musicnotes.com, "No More Rhyme" is performed in the key of A major, with Gibson's vocals ranging from F#3–D5. Lyrically, the track is about a relationship's "first hurdle." Gibson stated that it was one of the few songs where "I can't remember where or when I wrote it."

== Critical reception ==
Oscar Wednesday of Cashbox gave the track a negative review writing, "This tender ballad makes me want to lean over into little Debbie’s ear and whisper, "How can I say doo-doo? Let me count the ways." In his review for Electric Youth, Harry Sumrall of the Lakeland Ledger called the track a "sappy paean to love." Dan Firestone of the Toledo Blade however, gave it a positive review, calling it the best song off the album.

== Music video ==
James Yukich directed the video for "No More Rhyme". It was filmed in Los Angeles in mid-May 1989. The music video features Danica McKellar from the hit TV show The Wonder Years playing a cello. In the original recording of "No More Rhyme", Bob Osman played the cello. It was first released to Night Tracks on July 1, 1989. At the time, "No More Rhyme" was the third most requested video on MTV.

== Track listing ==
7-inch and cassette single

1. "No More Rhyme" (LP Version) – 4:15
2. "Over the Wall" (Dub Version) – 4:24

== Charts ==
=== Weekly charts ===
Weekly chart performance for "No More Rhyme"
| Chart (1989) | Peak position |
|---|---|
| Australia (ARIA) | 58 |
| Belgium (Ultratop 50 Flanders) | 40 |
| Costa Rica (EFE) | 3 |
| Canada Top Singles (RPM) | 24 |
| Canada Adult Contemporary (RPM) | 8 |
| US Billboard Hot 100 | 17 |
| US Adult Contemporary (Billboard) | 13 |
| US Top 100 Pop Singles (Cashbox) | 20 |
| US Adult Contemporary (Gavin Report) | 6 |
| US Top 40 (Gavin Report) | 13 |
| US Adult Contemporary (Radio & Records) | 13 |
| US Contemporary Hit Radio (Radio & Records) | 16 |
| Quebec (ADISQ) | 1 |

=== Year-end charts ===
Year-end chart performance for "No More Rhyme"
| Chart (1989) | Position |
|---|---|
| US Adult Contemporary (Gavin Report) | 66 |
