= Ray Stephens =

Ray Stephens may refer to:

- Ray Stephens (baseball)
- Ray Stephens (singer) (1954–1990), American singer and actor

== See also ==
- Ray Stevens (born 1939), American country and pop singer-songwriter and comedian
