= Without You (Debbie Gibson song) =

1990 single by Debbie Gibson

Single by Debbie Gibson
- B-side: "Without You (Instrumental)"
- Released: November 1, 1990
- Recorded: 1990
- Genre: Pop
- Length: 4:20
- Label: Atlantic/Warner Pioneer
- Composer: Tatsuro Yamashita
- Lyricist: Deborah Gibson
- Producer: Andrew Zulla

Debbie Gibson singles chronology
"We Could Be Together" (1989)	"Without You" (1990)	"Anything Is Possible" (1990)

"Without You" (ウィズアウト・ユー, Uizuauto Yū) is a single by American singer-songwriter Debbie Gibson. Written by Gibson and Tatsuro Yamashita, the single was released exclusively in Japan in 1990 by Warner Pioneer under the Atlantic label. It was featured in the 1990 TBS drama series Otoko ni Tsuite (男について; About Men). Originally released as a stand-alone single, "Without You" was included as a bonus track in the Japanese releases of Gibson's 1990 album Anything Is Possible and 1995 Greatest Hits album. It was also included in her 2017 box set We Could Be Together and the 2021 Deluxe Edition release of her 1989 album Electric Youth.

The single peaked at No. 26 on the Oricon weekly singles chart and was certified Gold by the RIAJ.

== Track listing ==
All lyrics are written by Deborah Gibson; all music is composed by Tatsuro Yamashita.

No.	Title	Length
1.	"Without You"	4:20
2.	"Without You" (Instrumental)	4:17
Total length:		8:47

=== Weekly charts ===
Weekly chart performance for "Without You"
Chart (1990)	Peak position
Japan (Oricon)	26

=== Certifications ===
Region	Certification	Certified units/sales
Japan (RIAJ)	Gold	50,000^{^}
^{^} Shipments figures based on certification alone.

== Tatsuro Yamashita version ==
"Sayonara Natsu no Hi"

Single by Tatsuro Yamashita

from the album Artisan
- Language: Japanese
- English title: Goodbye, Summer Days
- B-side: "Morning Shine"
- Released: May 10, 1991
- Recorded: 1991
- Genre: J-pop
- Length: 4:39
- Label: Moon
- Songwriter: Tatsuro Yamashita
- Producer: Tatsuro Yamashita

Tatsuro Yamashita singles chronology
"Endless Game" (1990)	"Sayonara Natsu no Hi" (1991)	"Turner's Steamroller" (1991)

Music video
- "Sayonara Natsu no Hi" on YouTube

Six months after the release of "Without You", Yamashita rewrote the song as "Sayonara Natsu no Hi" (さよなら夏の日; lit. "Goodbye, Summer Days"), released as one of the lead singles for his 1991 album Artisan. The lyrics were based on Yamashita's memories during his high school years. The song was used by Dai-ichi Life for their corporate commercial.

The B-side, "Morning Shine", was used as the theme song of the TBS morning program Big Morning (ビッグモーニング, Biggu Mōningu).

The single peaked at No. 12 on Oricon's weekly singles chart and charted for 20 weeks, selling over 185,000 copies.

In 2021, Warner Music Japan released an animated music video of "Sayonara Natsu no Hi" to celebrate the 30th anniversary of Artisan.

=== Track listing ===
All tracks are written by Tatsuro Yamashita.

No.	Title	Length
1.	"Sayonara Natsu no Hi" ((さよなら夏の日; "Goodbye, Summer Days"))	4:39
2.	"Morning Shine" (Mōningu Shain (モーニング・シャイン))	4:19
Total length:		8:58

=== Charts ===
Year	Chart	Position
1991	Japanese Oricon Singles Chart (Top 100)	12
