= Kirk Powers =

American bassist

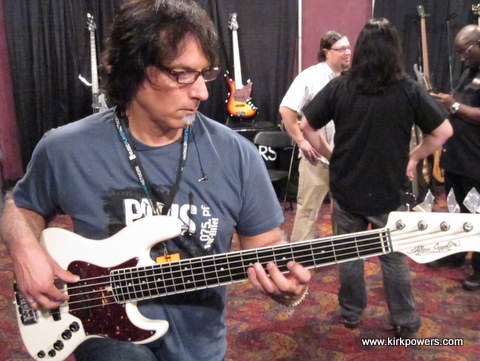
- Powers with his custom Alleva Coppolo LG5 Bass

Background information
- Born: November 24, 1957 (age 68)
- Origin: Queens, New York, U.S.
- Genres: Rock, pop, country, blues
- Instrument: Bass
- Years active: 1976–present
- Website: kirkpowers.com

Kirk Powers (born November 24, 1957) is an American bassist. In 1976, he joined American Tears, one of the first keyboard-oriented Heavy Ivory bands. He also played a key role in creating pre-production demos and masters with Touch.

Powers continued his professional career in the 1980s, touring and recording with other artists including Debbie Gibson on her Out of the Blue and Electric Youth world tours, earning multiple platinum and gold records along the way.

In July 2010 Kirk received a call to tour with the classic southern rock band Point Blank for an international tour.

Again in 2022–2025, Kirk continues touring with pop-princess Debbie Gibson on her EY35 "Electric Youth 35 Anniversary" tours.

Powers works with Alleva Coppolo Basses on his updated (KBP-4 and KBP-5) signature model custom basses and designs his own Musical Instrument Preamplifiers.

1976–present: Sessions, TV, jingles, theater, churches.

1987–1990: Touring bass player for pop star singer, actress Debbie Gibson. Out Of The Blue and Electric Youth World tours.

2017: Powers began to work with Texas musician and songwriter Casey James – formerly of American Idol.

2018: Special guest of Debbie Gibson on her Ladies of the 80s tour.

2019: Working with Grammy artists on a new Indie Film out of Austin, Texas.

2022: Touring bass player with the pop star, singer, and actress Debbie Gibson "The Body Remembers Tour" Summer '22

2024–2025: Debbie Gibson - Electric Youth 35th Anniversary International Tour

== Discography ==
- Deborah Gibson (Greatest Hits)
- Shake Your Love (Live in London, Atlantic A9059CD)
- Debbie Gibson Live In Japan
- Debbie Gibson "Electric Youth" (Atlantic Album78203)
- Point Blank "Volume 9" 2014
- Wonder Years TV Show "sound track" Atlantic
- Ana (Epic/ Park ZK45355)
- American Tears "Power House" Columbia
- Touch – "The Demos" Winter 1979
- Debbie Gibson - Electric Youth World Tour 1989-1990
- Debbie Gibson - Out Of The Blue World Tour1988
- Redd Volkaert (Grammy winner Guitar Virtuoso) Instructional Video Release 2015

Powers has worked with Debbie Gibson, Casey James, Dave Evans, Point Blank, Redd Volkaert, Roger Nichols, Otis Taylor, The Wonder Years, VooDoo Kings, Richard Gottehrer, Ana, American Tears, Pal Joey, Dave Lebolt, The Good Rats, Bruce Kulick, Lattanzi, JellyBean Benitez, Fred Norris from Howard Stern, Fred Zarr, George Lynch/Dokken, Derek St. Holmes/Ted Nugent, Guy Gelso w/ Zebra, David Baker.
