= Electric Youth (song) =

1989 single by Debbie Gibson

- North American single cover

Single by Debbie Gibson

from the album Electric Youth
- B-side: "We Could Be Together (Campfire Mix)"
- Released: March 17, 1989 (U.S.); April 24, 1989 (UK)
- Recorded: 1988
- Genre: Dance-pop; freestyle; Teen pop
- Length: 4:55
- Label: Atlantic
- Songwriter: Deborah Gibson
- Producer: Fred Zarr

Debbie Gibson singles chronology
"Lost in Your Eyes" (1989)	"Electric Youth" (1989)	"No More Rhyme" (1989)

Music video
- "Electric Youth" on YouTube

"Electric Youth" is a song by American singer-songwriter-actress Debbie Gibson. The song was solely written by Gibson and produced by Fred Zarr. It was released on March 17, 1989 as the second single from the album of the same name (1989) by Atlantic Records. Gibson had written the song as a statement about how young people of that era were seen and how their ideas were often ignored. As a teenager herself, she was a firm believer that the beliefs and ideas held by young people were just as important as those held by adults and the song reminded people of this. It also reminded them that the current youth would become the next generation of adults.

"Electric Youth" became one of Gibson's most famous singles of her career, peaking at number eleven on the US Billboard Hot 100, while also entering the top forty in twelve other countries including top ten positions in Israel, the Netherlands, and Panama. In 2012, Gibson re-recorded the song as "Electric Youth Reloaded", featuring arrangement and rap lyrics by American actor Jace Hall.

== Content ==
Unlike the majority of Gibson's songs at the time, which focused on finding or losing love, "Electric Youth" is an anthem with her calling for her generation to be heard.

== Critical reception ==
Bryan Buss from AllMusic described the song as "a bouncy, frenetic song that is ridiculously sing-alongable, but at the same it is time hard to really identify with it unless you're 12 (or at least young at heart)." The Daily Vault's Christopher Thelen noted that it "capture[s] the playfulness of Gibson's music and the carefree feeling of youth." Pop Rescue said it is "by far the best song" on the album. Meanwhile reviewer of British magazine Smash Hits took this single very critically: "Songs about one's generation are always a bit dodgy, aren't they? And, sadly, this is no exception. It's all about how great Ms. Gibson's generation is and how the sky is their limit and all that sort of twaddle. It is also finds Debbie at her squeakiest and, to add to the calamity, 'Electric Youth' screams the word 'bubbly' at you in no uncertain terms. It's got 'bubbly' lyric, a 'bubbly' beat and an infernally 'bubbly' tune! But it just ends up getting on your wick." Edem E. Ephraim and Dennis Fuller of London Boys, being host reviewers of singles column of Number One on 26 April 1989, considered that the song is too quick for dance and gave it a grade of 2 stars out of 5.

== Music video ==
The music video for the song was directed by Gibson and Jim Yukich and was nominated at the 1989 MTV Video Music Awards for Best Art Direction In A Video.

In 2006, elements of the music video (particularly the silhouette dance clips) were parodied by Cobie Smulders in the sitcom How I Met Your Mother for her character Robin Sparkles' own 1990s ("The 80's didn't come to Canada 'til like '93.") hit single, "Let's Go to the Mall."

== Track listing ==
All songs are written by Deborah Gibson

7" vinyl single/cassette single
No.	Title	Length
1.	"Electric Youth"	4:55
2.	"We Could Be Together" (Campfire Mix)	5:33

CD single/12" vinyl single
No.	Title	Length
1.	"Electric Youth" (Deep House Mix)	7:35
2.	"Electric Youth" (Shep's House Dub)	5:55
3.	"Electric Youth" (7" Version)	4:57
4.	"Electric Youth" (The Electro Mix)	6:35
5.	"Electric Youth" (The Electro Dub Gone Haywire)	6:32
6.	"We Could Be Together"	5:33

== Charts ==
=== Weekly charts ===
Chart (1989)	Peak position
Australia (ARIA)	21
Belgium (Ultratop 50 Flanders)	38
Canada Top Singles (RPM)	28
Canada Dance/Urban (RPM)	9
Colombia (Kelme)	10
Europe (Eurochart Hot 100)	27
Finland (Suomen virallinen lista)	13
Ireland (IRMA)	13
Israel (Israeli Singles Chart)	7
Japan (Tokio Hot 100)	16
Luxembourg (Radio Luxembourg)	12
Netherlands (Dutch Top 40)	5
Netherlands (Single Top 100)	35
Panama (UPI)	3
Spain (Spain Top 40 Radio)	40
UK Singles (Official Charts)	14
UK Dance Chart (Music Week)	10
US Billboard Hot 100	11
US Dance Club Songs (Billboard)	3
US Dance Singles Sales (Billboard)	2
US Cash Box Top 100	9
US Contemporary Hit Radio (Radio & Records)	9
US Top 40 (Gavin Report)	9
West Germany (GfK)	18
Quebec (ADISQ)	3

=== Year-end charts ===
Chart (1989)	Peak position
Australia (ARIA)	95

=== Certifications ===
Region	Certification	Certified units/sales
United States (RIAA)	Gold	500,000^{^}
^{^} Shipments figures based on certification alone.
