= Acoustic Control Corporation =

American amplifier manufacturer

Acoustic Control Corporation

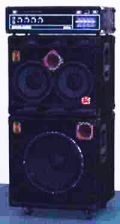
Acoustic 370 head on 2× David Eden bass cabinets

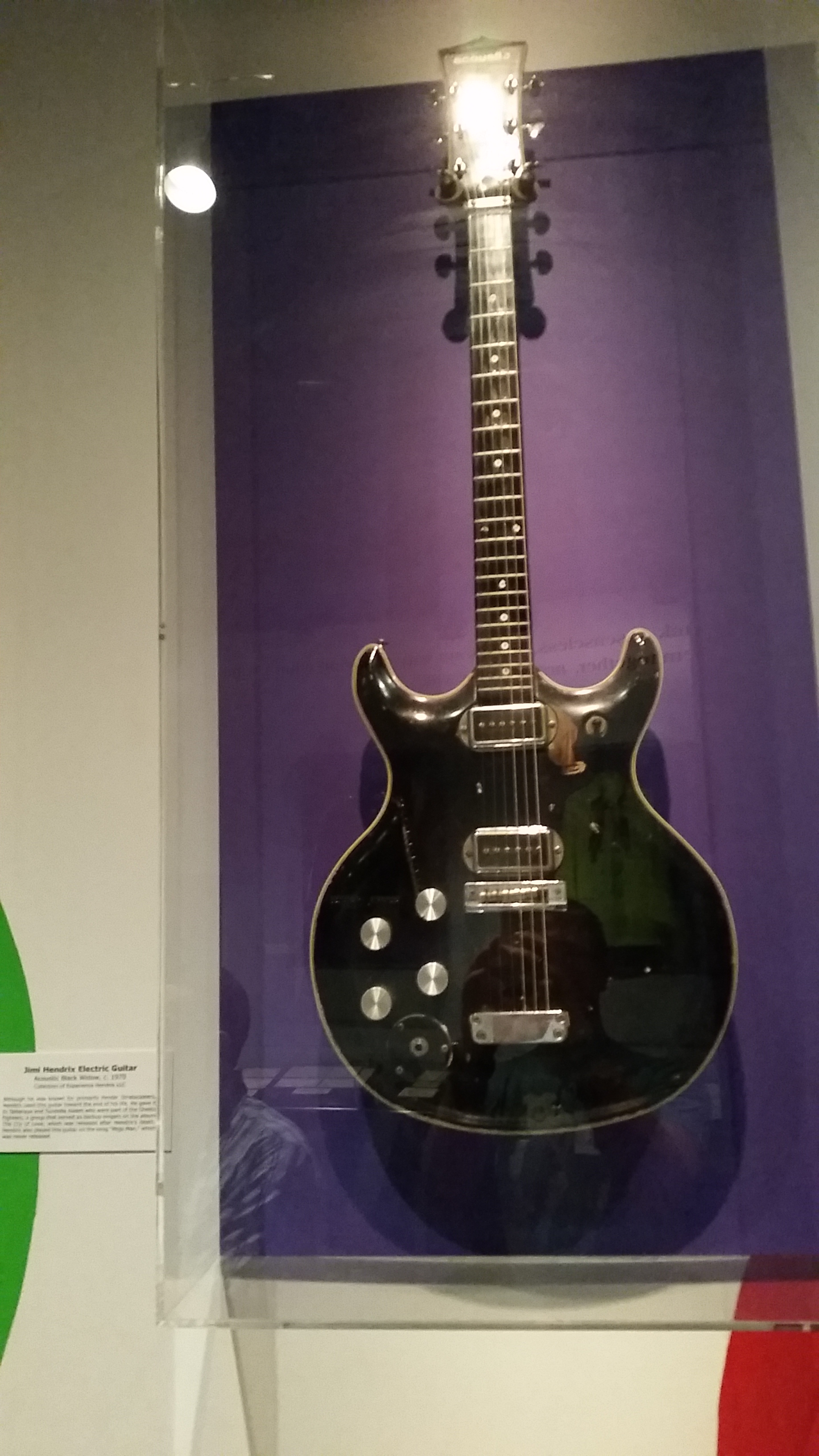
Black Widow (1970) of Jimi Hendrix

Acoustic Control Corporation was a manufacturer of instrument amplifiers, founded by Steve Marks (with the help of his father, record producer Larry Marks) and based in Van Nuys, California. Its original location was a shack on Sunset Boulevard in Los Angeles, California.

== History ==
Most of the amplifiers produced by ACC were solid-state, but a few models later in production were valve amps. The company is remembered in particular for its Acoustic 361 bass stack, consisting of an Acoustic 360 bass pre-amplifier and one or two Acoustic 361 W-bins, each featuring a built-in 200-watt RMS power amplifier and a rear-facing 18" Cerwin-Vega loudspeaker.

Acoustic also produced the "Black Widow" electric guitar and electric bass 1972 - 1975. The guitars and basses were based on designs used by Paul Barth for his Bartell guitars and basses. The majority of the guitars were built in Japan although Semi Moseley (of Mosrite fame) claimed to have built the last 200 guitars. One user associated with this guitar was jazz guitarist Larry Coryell who had an endorsement deal. Jimmy Nolen of James Brown's band was also a "Black Widow" user.

Robby Krieger of The Doors was the most high-profile early user of the Acoustic 260 head and 261 cabinet—the first models ever produced by ACC. Krieger's Acoustic amps were a major public-relations boost for the fledgling company. Albert King and Chuck Berry also used the 260 and 261. Canadian guitar virtuoso Frank Marino used the 270 model amplifier as did Frank Zappa, Pete Townshend and Ernie Isley. Pat Metheny used the Acoustic 134 model combo guitar amplifier. Bassist Jaco Pastorius was a famous user of Acoustic bass amplifiers, using two 360/361 units onstage. Other bass amp users included Gary Thain from Uriah Heep, Larry Graham, Jimmie Randall, John Paul Jones, Carl Radle, Kelly Groucutt, Ric Grech, John McVie, Tony Stevens, Peter "Overend" Watts, Danny Sheridan, Rod Ellicott (Cold Blood), Flea, John Deacon, and Kirk Powers, the last two using an Acoustic 371 (combination of the 370 amp & 301 bass cabinet). The Mahavishnu Orchestra members (bass, keyboards, violin excluding John McLaughlin) used Acoustic amplifiers. Verden Allen, organist with Mott the Hoople used a 260 head amp. In the early '70s the Dutch band Focus used the 271 and 371 models while on the tour following the release of their Focus II LP.

Acoustic Control Corporation went out of business in the 1980s, then returned under the name True Tone Audio as a manufacturer of P.A. amplifiers.

Latter-day employee and designer Steve Rabe went on to establish specialist bass amplifier manufacturer SWR (now owned by Fender Musical Instruments Corporation) in 1984, then Raven Labs in 1998.

Acoustic returned in 2007 under the name Acoustic Amplification, starting with the models B20 and AB50.

In 2011 another branch of Acoustic, Acoustic USA founded by George Grexa and manufactured by The G.P.G. Co, launched a new version of the 360/361 bass amplifier as well as various speaker cabinets and a power amplifier. The new re-designed version of the historic Acoustic 360/361 has immediately featured bassists like Flea, Antonio Iorio and many others.
