= Anything Is Possible (Debbie Gibson album) =

1990 studio album by Debbie Gibson

Studio album by Debbie Gibson
- Released: November 20, 1990
- Recorded: October 1989 – August 1990
- Studios: GPI/Electric Blue (Long Island, New York); The Hit Factory (New York City, New York); Innersanctum Sound System (Encino, California); Tyrell Music Studios (Los Angeles, California); Sunset Sound (Hollywood, California); Z Studios (Brooklyn, New York)
- Genres: Pop; dance-pop; bubblegum pop
- Length: 73:38
- Label: Atlantic
- Producers: Deborah Gibson; Lamont Dozier; John "Jellybean" Benitez; Fred Zarr

Debbie Gibson chronology
Electric Youth (1989)	Anything Is Possible (1990)	Body, Mind, Soul (1993)

Singles from Anything Is Possible
- 1. "Anything Is Possible" Released: November 13, 1990; 2. "(This So-Called) Miracle" Released: February 13, 1991; 3. "One Hand, One Heart" Released: April 17, 1991; 4. "One Step Ahead" Released: July 22, 1991; 5. "Sure" Released: November 1991; 6. "In His Mind" Released: February 25, 1992

Professional ratings
Review scores
Source	Rating
AllMusic	2/5 stars
Calgary Herald	C
Entertainment Weekly	B
The Rolling Stone Album Guide	1/5 stars

Anything Is Possible is the third studio album by American singer-songwriter Debbie Gibson, released on November 20, 1990, by Atlantic Records. The album features a collaboration between Gibson and veteran Motown songwriter Lamont Dozier, who co-wrote four of the album's tracks including the title single. "Stand Your Ground" marked Gibson's final collaboration with longtime producer Fred Zarr.

At the time of the album's release in late 1990, Gibson was 20 years old and the late-1980s teen pop wave was near its end. The album was Gibson's first to not reach the Top 10 on the Billboard 200 Albums chart, peaking at No. 41 in the United States. It made the top 40 of the Cashbox albums chart for one week, peaking at No. 38 on December 22, 1990, before descending down the chart. The album sold fewer copies than her previous two albums, Out of the Blue and Electric Youth, both of which had gone multi-platinum.

Anything Is Possible was certified Gold by the RIAA. In Japan, the album reached No. 5 on the Oricon weekly albums chart and was certified Gold by the RIAJ. The album was released in March 1991 in the United Kingdom but stalled at No. 69. The title single reached the top 30 of the Billboard Hot 100 chart.

== Critical reception ==
Billboard praised the album, stating that "much will be made about Gibson's more adult image and vocal style. What deserves more attention, however, is something that has always been found in her work: a true gift for crafting memorable pop songs."

Cashbox noted that "she's back, and with some pretty powerful ammunition. As if her own, still developing, songwriting skills aren't impressive enough, she has support from the great Lament Dozier. Divided into a ballad side and a dance side so you can enjoy either mood uninterrupted."

Entertainment Weekly also praised the album, noting that "it shouldn't come as any surprise that Debbie Gibson's third record, Anything Is Possible, is a more polished work than her vibrant debut, Out of the Blue, or her brasher follow-up, Electric Youth. What she's lost in raw teen energy she's gained in musical assurance," however conceding that "clearly Gibson means well; her advice just isn't very meaningful. But if she gets a little more emotional experience, a little more insight about life and how to live it — and a slightly bigger record collection — anything really may be possible."

The Los Angeles Times were more critical of the record, calling it a "redundant, overproduced, 72 minute sprawl," yet also stating that "Gibson does display a good knack with a melodic hook and a credible mastery of contemporary pop craft. When she combines those qualities with some sass and spunk on the deliciously catty, unabashedly adolescent "It Must've Been My Boy," the results are vibrant. Too often, though, Gibson uses her craftsmanship to dress up thin lyrics in overly elaborate garb."

AllMusic were also mixed in their review, commenting that "though some of the material is fairly decent (including "Another Brick Fall" and the Madonna-ish "It Must've Been My Boy"), most of it is pedestrian, homogenized and quite forgettable."

== Reissues ==
The album was included in the 2017 box set We Could Be Together, with two B-sides as bonus tracks. A special two-disc digipack edition was released by Cherry Red Records on March 18, 2022.

== Track listing ==
The LP and cassette releases have unique labels on their sides. Side A is labeled "NRG↑" (pronounced "energy up") for its upbeat songs while the ballad-oriented side B is "Mood Swings".

All tracks are written and produced by Deborah Gibson, except where indicated.

NRG↑
No.	Title	Writer(s)	Producer(s)	Length
1.	"Another Brick Falls"			3:55
2.	"Anything Is Possible"	Gibson; Lamont Dozier	Dozier	3:44
3.	"Reverse Psychology"	Gibson; Dozier	Dozier	4:25
4.	"One Step Ahead"	Gibson; Dozier	John "Jellybean" Benitez	4:51
5.	"Stand Your Ground∗"		Fred Zarr	3:48
6.	"Deep Down∗"			4:52
7.	"It Must've Been My Boy"	Gibson; Dozier	Dozier	4:19
8.	"Lead Them Home My Dreams"			5:32
Total length:				35:33

Mood Swings
No.	Title	Length
1.	"One Hand, One Heart"	4:35
2.	"Sure"	4:17
3.	"Negative Energy"	3:40
4.	"Mood Swings"	3:52
5.	"Try∗"	4:07
6.	"In His Mind∗"	3:33
7.	"Where Have You Been?"	6:07
8.	"This So-Called Miracle"	7:28
Total length:		37:46

Japan bonus track
No.	Title	Writer(s)	Producer(s)	Length
17.	"Without You"	Gibson; Tatsuro Yamashita	Andrew Zulla	4:17

Deluxe Digipack Edition bonus tracks
No.	Title	Length
17.	"So Close to Forever"
18.	"The Most Beautiful Love Song"

Deluxe Digipack Edition Disc 2: The Remixes
No.	Title	Writer(s)	Length
1.	"Anything Is Possible" (Remix Edit)	Gibson; Dozier
2.	"Anything Is Possible" (12″ Harding & Curnow Remix)	Gibson; Dozier
3.	"Anything Is Possible" (Jellybean Dance Mix)	Gibson; Dozier
4.	"Anything Is Possible" (Radio Edit of Dance Mix)	Gibson; Dozier
5.	"Anything Is Possible" (Dub Mix)	Gibson; Dozier
6.	"Anything Is Possible" (Instrumental)	Gibson; Dozier
7.	"(This So-Called) Miracle" (Edit)
8.	"One Step Ahead" (Hot Radio Mix)	Gibson; Dozier
9.	"One Step Ahead" (Club Mix)	Gibson; Dozier
10.	"One Step Ahead" (Masters at Work Mix)	Gibson; Dozier
11.	"One Step Ahead" (Underground Mix)	Gibson; Dozier
12.	"One Step Ahead" (Radio Mix with Rap)	Gibson; Dozier
13.	"One Step Ahead" (Bonus Beats)	Gibson; Dozier
14.	"One Step Ahead" (PWL 7″ Edit)	Gibson; Dozier
15.	"One Step Ahead" (PWL 12″ Remix)	Gibson; Dozier

∗ denotes track featured only on CD and cassette formats.

== Charts ==
=== Weekly charts ===
Weekly chart performance for Anything Is Possible
Chart (1990–1991)	Peak position
Australian Albums (ARIA)	80
Canada Top Albums/CDs (RPM)	85
Japanese Albums (Oricon)	5
UK Albums (Official Charts)	69
US Billboard 200	41
US Top 200 Albums (Cashbox)	38

Weekly chart performance for Anything Is Possible (Deluxe Edition)
Chart (2022)	Peak position
Scottish Albums (Official Charts)	79
UK Albums Sales (OCC)	65
UK Independent Albums (Official Charts)	27

== Certifications and sales ==
Region	Certification	Certified units/sales
Japan (RIAJ)	Gold	100,000^{^}
United States (RIAA)	Gold	500,000^{^}
^{^} Shipments figures based on certification alone.

== Personnel ==
Adapted credits from the liner notes of Anything Is Possible.

Musicians

- Debbie Gibson – vocals, keyboard programming (1, 3, 5, 6, 12), acoustic piano solo (1), drum programming (3, 5, 6, 12), backing vocals (7, 14, 15), all instruments (9, 11), acoustic piano (10, 13, 15, 16), keyboards (13)
- Lamont Dozier – keyboard programming (2, 3), rhythm track arrangements (2, 3, 7), backing vocals (2), drum programming (3)
- Hense Powell – keyboard programming (2), keyboards (7)
- Andrew Zulla – keyboard programming (3), drum programming (3)
- Ed Terry – synthesizers (4)
- Fred Zarr – keyboard programming (5), drum programming (5)
- Gary Corbett – keyboards (8, 16), Hammond B3 organ (13)
- Carlos Alomar – guitars (1, 2, 10, 15, 16), acoustic guitar (7, 8), electric guitar (8), synth guitar (8)
- Ira Siegel – guitars (3, 5, 13, 14), electric guitar (7), acoustic guitar (12)
- Paul Pesco – guitars (4, 6)
- Eluriel "Tinker" Barfield – bass guitar (6)
- Freddie Washington – bass guitar (7)
- Doug Stegmeyer – bass guitar (8, 10, 13, 15, 16)
- Fred Levine – drums (1, 8, 10, 13, 15, 16), drum overdubs (3, 12)
- John "Jellybean" Benitez – drum programming (4)
- Quentin Dennard – drums (7)
- Bashiri Johnson – percussion (1–5, 7, 10, 12–15)
- Adam Tese – percussion (6, 10), saxophone (6)
- Margaret Ross – harp (16)
- Paul Buckmaster – horn arrangements (3), string arrangements (3, 9, 10, 14, 15)
- Jerry Hey – horn arrangement (7, 10)
- Jocelyn Brown – backing vocals (1)
- Connie Harvey – backing vocals (1)
- Michelle Cobbs – backing vocals (3, 16)
- B.J. Nelson – backing vocals (3, 6, 8)
- Keith Stewart – backing vocals (3, 8, 15)
- Carrie Johnson – backing vocals (4, 8, 13)
- Libby Johnson – backing vocals (4, 8, 13)
- Robin Clark – backing vocals (5–8, 10, 16)
- Fonzi Thornton – backing vocals (5–8, 10, 16)
- Freddie Jackson – backing vocals (12)
- Yolanda Lee – backing vocals (12)
- Jesi Forte – backing vocals (track 15)
- Dennis Collins – backing vocals (track 16)

Production

- Diane Gibson – executive producer, management
- Debbie Gibson – arrangements (1–3, 6, 8–16)
- Lamont Dozier – arrangements (2, 7)
- Hense Powell – arrangements (3, 7)
- Jellybean Benitez – arrangements (4)
- Ed Terry – arrangements (4)
- Fred Zarr – arrangements (5)
- Phil Castellano – recording engineer (1–8, 10, 12–16), mix engineer (5, 13, 15)
- Andrew Zulla – recording engineer (1, 3, 4, 8, 9, 11), programming engineer (1, 6, 11)
- Bob Rosa – mix engineer (1–3, 7, 9, 11, 12, 14, 16)
- Reggie Dozier – recording engineer (2, 7)
- Hugo Dwyer – mix engineer (4, 6, 10)
- Bill Esses – recording engineer (5)
- Dave Sorenson – assistant mix engineer (1–3, 7, 9, 11, 12, 14, 16)
- Andy Grassi – assistant mix engineer (5, 8, 13, 15)
- Jay Ryan – assistant mix engineer (6, 10)
- Ted Jensen – mastering at Sterling Sound (New York, NY)
- John Karlquist – album coordinator
- Alberto Tolot – photography
- Paul Starr – makeup (Profile, Los Angeles)
- Victor Vidal – hair (Cloutier, Los Angeles)
- Derric Lowe – stylist
