= Ultrachrist! =

UltraChrist!
- Directed by: Kerry Douglas Dye
- Written by: Kerry Douglas Dye; Jordan Hoffman
- Starring: Jonathan C. Green; Celia A. Montgomery; Samuel Bruce Campbell; Dara Shindler; Jordan Hoffman; Danielle Langlois
- Music by: Howard Leshaw
- Production company: LeisureSuit Media
- Release date: April 24, 2003 (BlackPoint Film Festival)
- Running time: 92 minutes
- Language: English

Ultrachrist is a 2003 comedy film directed by Kerry Douglas Dye and starring Jonathan C. Green as Jesus/Ultrachrist. The film was produced by LeisureSuit Media and written by Kerry Douglas Dye and Jordan Hoffman.

== Premise ==
Jesus Christ returns to modern-day New York City to fulfill biblical prophecies and usher in 2000 years of godly peace. When he discovers that he is unable to relate to modern youth, he dons a superhero costume and appears to the world as Ultrachrist.
