= Far Away in America =

Single by Die Deutsche Fußballnationalmannschaft & Village People
- B-side: "United We'll Go"
- Released: 1994
- Genre: Pop
- Length: 3:40
- Label: Ariola
- Songwriters: Ralph Siegel; Bernd Meinunger
- Producer: Ralph Siegel

Die Deutsche Fußballnationalmannschaft & Village People singles chronology
"Sex Over the Phone" (1985)	"Far Away in America" (1994)	"A Very Merry Christmas to You" (2018)

Far Away in America is a song sung by the players of the Germany national football team featuring the American disco group Village People. It was the German team song for the 1994 FIFA World Cup that took place in the United States. They performed it on the TV show Wetten, dass..? in Hanover on May 28, 1994. The song peaked at number 44 in the German music chart in July 1994.

== Sources ==
- Article about Far Away in America on BR online (German)
- "Far Away in America". swisscharts.com.
