= Bartell (guitars) =

- Industry: Guitar-making
- Founded: 1964
- Founders: Paul Barth; Ted Peckels
- Defunct: 1969
- Headquarters: Riverside, California, United States

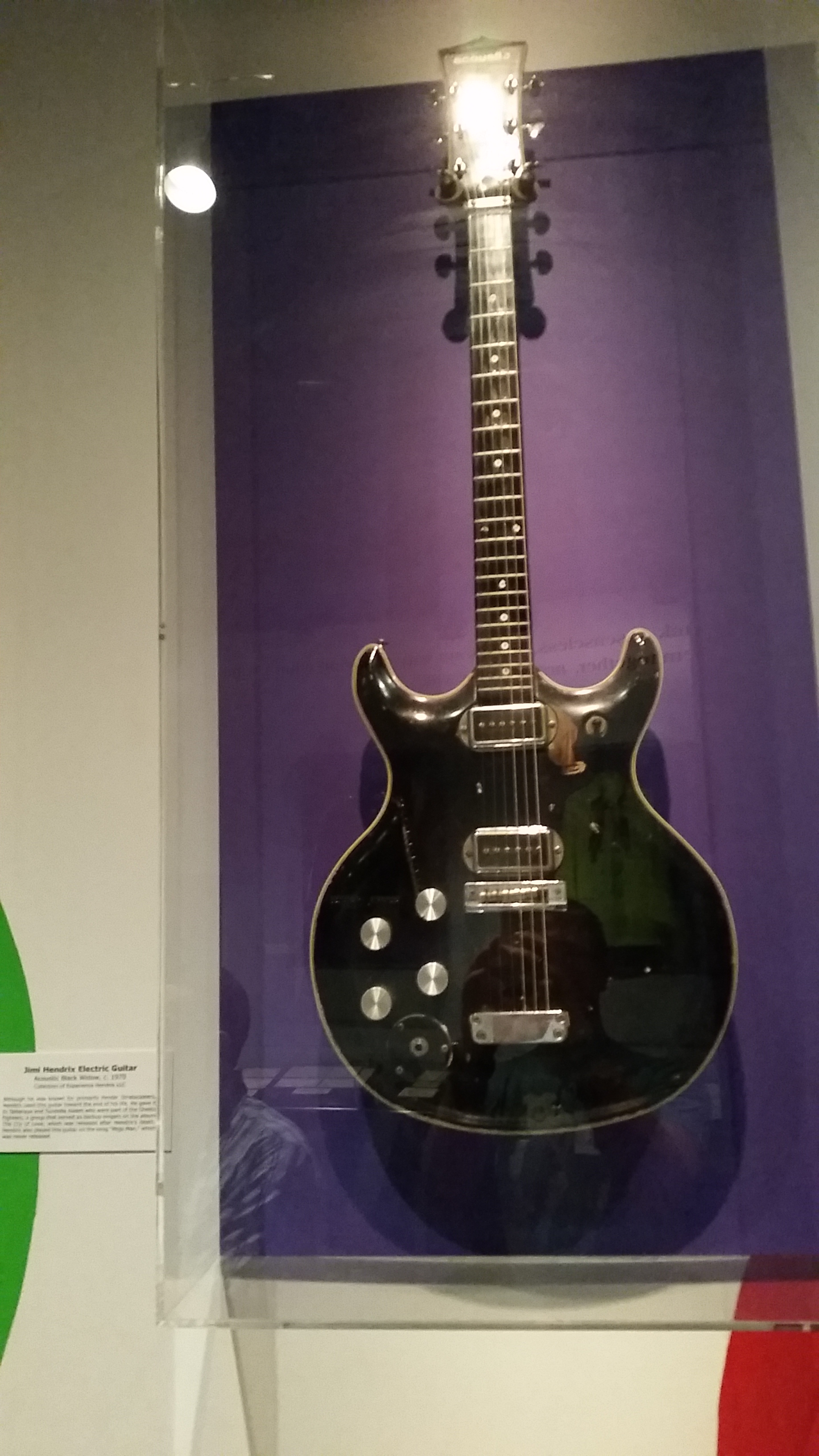
Acoustic Black Widow by Bartell (1970), played by Jimi Hendrix.

Bartell was a Riverside, California-based maker of guitars and basses, founded by Paul Barth and Ted Peckels. The company was active from 1964 to 1969. According to Peckels, approximately 2,000 instruments were made during this period. The company also made instruments for Hohner, St. George, and Lancer.

== George Harrison ==
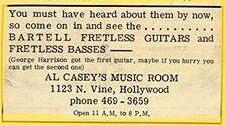
Bartell fretless guitars and basses advertised in the Los Angeles Free Press, 1 September 1967, mentioning "George Harrison got the first guitar..."

George Harrison was gifted a Bartell fretless guitar (the first prototype) by Hollywood session player and music shop owner Al Casey, whose wife Maxine on 1 August 1967 took it up to Blue Jay Way, where Harrison was staying. Harrison took the guitar back to the UK, where it ended up at Abbey Road Studios. John Lennon was intrigued by the Bartell, but he found it difficult to play. They passed it around, then put it in the studio locker in studio 2. In a 6 June 1968 radio interview with Kenny Everett, Harrison referred to it as 'the mad guitar'. Lennon was heard playing it while being interviewed by Everett.

The Beatles were recording The White Album at the time. Musicologists Kenny Jenkins, of Leeds Beckett University and Richard Perks, University of Kent, have expressed the opinion that the fretless was used on "Happiness Is a Warm Gun" and "Helter Skelter", with Perks also suggesting its use on Savoy Truffle. When the Beatles split up in 1969, Harrison took the guitar back to Friar Park, where it sat in his collection until 1985. The guitar was then given to its current owner, session musician Ray Russell, while recording the film Water.

In March 2020, this guitar was shown on the BBC Television programme Antiques Roadshow, where Jon Baddeley of Bonhams said "this is an incredibly rare Beatles guitar with an enviable history, which turns out to be one of the most valuable items ever seen on the show." It was valued at £300,000 - £400,000 by Baddeley. The programme included a picture of Harrison with his guitars, in which the Bartell is clearly visible.

Despite the higher valuation, the guitar was sold by Bonhams at an October 2020 auction for £237,562 (including buyer's premium).

== Other owners ==
A twelve-string electric Bartell, 'St. George XK12', was owned by John Frusciante. The company also made guitars for Jimi Hendrix.

John Paul Jones of Led Zeppelin played a Hohner-branded Bartell fretless bass during the band's 1972 Australian tour.
