= Anything Is Possible (Debbie Gibson song) =

Single by Debbie Gibson

from the album Anything Is Possible
- B-side: "So Close to Forever"
- Released: November 13, 1990; February 25, 1991 (UK)
- Genre: R&B; dance-pop
- Length: 3:39
- Label: Atlantic
- Songwriters: Deborah Gibson; Lamont Dozier
- Producers: Deborah Gibson; Lamont Dozier

Debbie Gibson singles chronology
"Without You" (1990)	"Anything Is Possible" (1990)	"This So-Called Miracle" (1990)

Music video
- "Anything Is Possible" on YouTube

"Anything Is Possible" is a song by American singer-songwriter Debbie Gibson. Entirely written, arranged, and produced by Gibson and Motown writer Lamont Dozier, it was released on November 13, 1990 by Atlantic Records, as the lead single and title track to her third studio album, Anything Is Possible (1990). In Europe, a version remixed by Harding and Curnow of PWL was released in place of the original. The track received favorable reviews, with the production being compared to the work of Madonna. It charted in Canada and peaked at number 26 on the US Billboard Hot 100. The accompanying music video was directed by Jay Brown.

== Content ==
Sheet music for "Anything Is Possible" is published in the key of A major, with the vocals ranging from G3 to E5. TimesDaily described the song as an anthem that "tells you that even though you might think you are living the 'perfect' life you should not limit yourself," and that "you can do anything in life when you put a little extra effort into it."

== Critical reception ==
Larry Flick from Billboard magazine wrote, "Grown-up teen diva offers the title track to her fab new album. Mature, understated vocals glide over a glistening pop/disco instrumental base. Remix by Jellybean on the 12-inch accentuates the tune's fun and funky tendencies." Gina Arnold from Entertainment Weekly named it a "high-energy" cut, adding that the song "come close" to being "as infectiously Madonna-esque" as Gibson's 1987 hit "Shake Your Love". Pan-European magazine Music & Media described it as "Madonna-inspired dance pop with a fashionable co-production by Motown veteran Lamont Dozier. Certainly a dancefloor filler, though EHR should pay close attention too."

== Chart performance ==
The song entered the US Billboard Hot 100 the week of November 17, 1990, at number 74. It peaked at number 26 on January 12, 1991, spending 12 weeks in total on the chart. The song was listed on the Canada RPM Top Tracks.

The track began receiving airplay in late November 1990 in Europe, first in Sweden.

== Music video ==
The music video for "Anything Is Possible" was directed by Jay Brown. In the video, Gibson sings atop an apartment building, while a choreographed dance is performed on the floor. The video features South African actress Musetta Vander. Lamont Dozier also appears in the video singing backup.

== Track listings ==
All tracks are written by Deborah Gibson and Lamont Dozier.

No.	Title	Length
1.	"Anything Is Possible"	3:43
2.	"So Close to Forever"	3:00

== Charts ==
Chart (1990–1991)	Peak position
Australia (ARIA)	60
Canada Top Singles (RPM)	32
Canada Adult Contemporary (RPM)	15
Quebec (ADISQ)	17
UK Singles (Official Charts)	51
UK Airplay (Music Week)	37
US Billboard Hot 100	26
US Adult Contemporary (Billboard)	48
US Cash Box Top 100	26
US Contemporary Hit Radio (Radio & Records)	21
US Top 40 (Gavin Report)	22
US Adult Contemporary (Gavin Report)	35

== Uses in pop culture ==
In 1992, the song was used in the Season One episode of the 1990s action crime drama TV series Street Justice in the episode "Backbeat" where Debbie Gibson made a guest appearance in that episode as a singer named Gabrielle.
