= SWR Sound Corporation =

Company

- Company type: Private
- Genre: Musical equipment
- Founded: Sylmar, California (1983)
- Founder: Steve W. Rabe
- Headquarters: Scottsdale, Arizona, U.S.
- Products: bass guitar amplifiers preamps speaker cabinets acoustic guitar amplifiers
- Website: http://www.swramps.com/

SWR Sound Corporation was a specialist manufacturer of bass guitar amplifiers, preamps, speaker cabinets, and acoustic guitar amplifiers.

== History ==
The company was founded as SWR Engineering, Inc. by its namesake, Steve W. Rabe. Rabe was known for his engineering work at Acoustic Control Corporation. After extensive research with top Los Angeles studio bassists, SWR released its first commercial product in 1984, the PB-200 hybrid tube/solid-state bass guitar amplifier. The first 5 units were manufactured by hand in a garage in the San Fernando Valley, and one was used on the recording of "[We Are the World]." This model soon became the Studio 220 with an amplifier section capable of 220 watts into 4 ohms. The SM-400 added a crossover and second amplifier channel to allow stereo or bi-amp mode. A preamp-only version was manufactured by SWR for neighbor GT Electronics (Groove Tubes) to market as their Studio Series Tube Preamp for Bass, STP-B1. SWR then pursued development of a speaker cabinet to accompany its amps. In 1986, SWR released the Goliath, a 4 x 10" full-range speaker cabinet with a built-in horn tweeter, a first for bass cabinets.

The company's name was changed to SWR Sound Corporation on 1 December 1997 as part of a restructuring plan. Rabe sold the company to accountant Daryl Paul Jamison and soon created a new company, Raven Labs. SWR was based in Sylmar, California until January 1999, when it moved to the former Cetec Gauss speaker factory in nearby Sun Valley, California.

SWR is now a brand in Fender's portfolio rather than an independent company. Its products were manufactured at Fender's facilities in Corona, California and Ensenada, Baja California. Fender is headquartered in Scottsdale, Arizona.

FMIC ceased all SWR production in early 2013.

== Products ==
The Workingman's Series of amplifiers was redesigned and upgraded to the WorkingPro Series - amplifier heads and speaker cabinets in 2005, and amplifier/speaker combos in 2006.

At the January 2007 NAMM Show, SWR introduced the SM-1500 head, which combined the hybrid tube/solid-state platform with some Fender-era innovations, including a tube-driven compressor. At 1500 watts (in bridged mode at 4 ohms), the SM-1500 was the most powerful toroidal-based amplifier on the market.

The July NAMM Summer Session featured the new Natural Blonde combo. Built on the platform of the Acoustic Series California Blonde, the Natural Blonde is a 2-channel 2X8" combo designed especially for acoustic bassists. Bass Player magazine gave it a very favorable review and Editor's Award in the August, 2007 issue.
