= Sex Over the Phone =

Studio album by Village People
- Released: June 30 1985
- Recorded: 1984
- Genre: Dance-pop, new wave
- Length: 37:09
- Label: Columbia, Black Scorpio
- Producer: Jacques Morali, Henri Belolo

Village People chronology
Fox on the Box (1982)	Sex Over the Phone (1985)	The Best of Village People (1994)

Singles from Sex Over the Phone
- 1. "Sex Over the Phone" Released: 1985; 2. "New York City" Released: 1985

Professional ratings
Review scores
Source	Rating
AllMusic	link

Sex Over the Phone is the ninth studio album by Village People. The title track, "Sex Over the Phone", had some airplay in Europe, but did not reach the height of the group's earlier releases. As gay subtexts are often found in Village People songs, some have suggested that themes in this album refer to safer sex due to the emergence of AIDS within the gay community during the 1980s. The album is also notable for the appearance of new lead singer, Ray Stephens, who also played Roy on the children's television show The Great Space Coaster during the same period.

The cover photo for the album sees the group donning updated versions of their iconic costumes, after having mostly dropped the imagery (on album covers, at least) several years earlier (see Renaissance).

The 1999 CD release includes the 1999 club mix of the title track. In 2009, the album was released in digital format through online music retailers.

== Track listing ==
1. "Sex Over the Phone" – 4:22
2. "New York City" – 6:00
3. "Just Give Me What I Want" – 6:12
4. "I Won't Take No for an Answer" – 4:28
5. "Power of the Night" – 5:58
6. "Sexual Education" – 5:32
7. "Sensual" – 4:37
8. "Sex Over the Phone" (New Recorded Club Mix) – 4:15 (bonus track on 1999 CD re-release)

== Personnel ==
- Ray Stephens (Police Officer) - lead vocals and backing vocals
- Felipe Rose (Native American) - tambourine and backing vocals
- Glenn Hughes (Leatherman) - backing vocals
- Alex Briley (Soldier) - backing vocals
- Mark Lee (Construction Worker) - backing vocals
- Jeff Olson (Cowboy) - backing vocals

Musicians

- Fred Zarr - synthesizers and drum machines
- Ira Siegel - electric guitar (uncredited)
- Michael Brecker - saxophone (uncredited)

== Charts ==
Chart (1985)	Peak position
Swedish Albums (Sverigetopplistan)	47
