= We Could Be Together =

Single by Debbie Gibson

from the album Electric Youth
- B-side: "No More Rhyme (Acoustic Version)"
- Released: August 7, 1989
- Genre: Bubblegum pop
- Length: 4:28
- Label: Atlantic
- Songwriter: Deborah Gibson
- Producers: Deborah Gibson; Fred Zarr

Debbie Gibson singles chronology
"No More Rhyme" (1989)	"We Could Be Together" (1989)	"Without You" (1990)

Music video
- We Could Be Together on YouTube

"We Could Be Together" is the ninth single by American singer-songwriter-actress Debbie Gibson, and the fourth from the 1989 album Electric Youth. Produced by Gibson and Fred Zarr, the single was edited from its original recording. This song features the talents of Matt Finders. The single performed better overseas than at home, peaking at No. 22 in the United Kingdom but stalling at No. 57 in Australia and No. 71 on the Billboard Hot 100 in the United States.

== Critical reception ==
Bryan Buss from AllMusic wrote, ""We Could Be Together", in which she basically tells her friends and family to go fly a kite, is practically anthemic in its joy at taking a risk on love: "I'll take this chance/I'll make this choice/I'll give up my security/for just the possibility/that we could be together/for a while." It's teen pop at its best: it makes you feel young, it makes you want to sing, it makes you want to fall in love."

== Track listing ==
All tracks are written by Deborah Gibson.

7" vinyl single/cassette single
No.	Title	Length
1.	"We Could Be Together"	4:38
2.	"No More Rhyme" (Acoustic Version)	4:13

3" CD single (Germany)
No.	Title	Length
1.	"We Could Be Together" (House Mix)	7:25
2.	"We Could Be Together" (House of Trix)	5:59
3.	"We Could Be Together" (Radio Mix)	4:32

== Chart history ==
=== Weekly charts ===
Chart (1989)	Peak position
Australia (ARIA)	57
Ireland (IRMA)	23
UK Singles (Official Charts)	22
US Cashbox	76
US Billboard Hot 100	71
Peru (UNIMPRO)	5
Europe (Eurochart Hot 100)	85
