= Body/Antibody =

- Directed by: Kerry Douglas Dye; Jordan Hoffman
- Written by: Kerry Douglas Dye
- Produced by: Jordan Hoffman
- Starring: Robert Gomes; Leslie Kendall Dye; Frank Deal
- Cinematography: Raoul Germain
- Edited by: Evan Gatica
- Music by: Charlie Schmid
- Production company: LeisureSuit Media
- Release date: 7 June 2007 (Brooklyn International Film Festival)
- Running time: 98 minutes
- Country: United States
- Language: English

Body/Antibody is a 2007 American comedy-drama film directed by Kerry Douglas Dye and Jordan Hoffman, starring Robert Gomes, Leslie Kendall Dye and Frank Deal.

== Cast ==
- Robert Gomes as Kip Polyard
- Leslie Kendall Dye as Celine
- Frank Deal as Andy
- Debbie Gibson as The Caseworker
- Saidah Arrika Ekulona as Dorothy
- Antony Hagopian as Tony
- Pamelyn Chee as 'Injustice!' Woman
- Irma St. Paule as Woman at Bus Stop

== Reception ==
Kurt Dahlke of DVD Talk rated the film three and a half out of five stars and wrote that "smart scripting and great performances make this rise above the straight-to-DVD ranks, begging to be on the big screen." Richard van Oosterom of See Magazine rated the film three and a half out of five stars and called the performances "understated and natural".

Elizabeth Chorney-Booth of Fast Forward Weekly called the performances "textured" and the atmosphere "sparse but tense". Dave Jaffer of Hour Community wrote that the film's "stark whiteness injects a palpable sense of order and cleanliness to the proceedings, which is of course sullied by a claustrophobic and bloody third act that exposes how base our darker desires really are."

Marya Summers of New Times Broward-Palm Beach wrote that the film "doesn't cut important corners and makes few mistakes".
