= One Step Ahead (Debbie Gibson song) =

Single by Debbie Gibson

from the album Anything Is Possible
- B-side: "One Step Ahead (LP Version)"
- Released: June 1991
- Genre: Dance-pop; new jack swing; freestyle; house
- Length: 4:18
- Label: Atlantic
- Songwriters: Deborah Gibson; Lamont Dozier
- Producer: John "Jellybean" Benitez

Debbie Gibson singles chronology
"One Hand, One Heart" (1991)	"One Step Ahead" (1991)	"Sure" (1991)

"One Step Ahead" is the fourth single by American singer-songwriter-actress Debbie Gibson, from her third album, Anything Is Possible (1990). The song was written by Gibson and Lamont Dozier and produced by John "Jellybean" Benitez. It was remixed for both the single and maxi single by "Little" Louie Vega and Kenny "Dope" Gonzales for Masters at Work Productions, Inc.

Although this single failed to chart on the US Billboard Hot 100, it scored on the Billboard Hot Maxi Singles and Hot Dance charts, peaking at No. 21 and No. 18, respectively. In the UK, as the follow-up single to "Anything Is Possible," it reached No. 80.

== Track listing ==
All tracks are written by Deborah Gibson and Lamont Dozier.

No.	Title	Length
1.	"One Step Ahead" (Hot Radio Mix)	4:18
2.	"One Step Ahead" (LP Version)	4:52

== Charts ==
Chart (1991)	Peak position
UK Singles chart	80
UK Airplay (Music Week)	54
UK Club Chart (Music Week)	22
US Dance Club Songs (Billboard)	18
US Dance Singles Sales (Billboard)	21
