= Jordan Hoffman =

American film critic

- Born: United States
- Occupations: Film critic, writer

Jordan Hoffman is an American freelance film critic and former actor, director, and producer. He is best known for his work with New York Daily News, The Guardian, Film.com, Vanity Fair, ScreenCrush, and The Times of Israel. He is also a contributor to Badass Digest and StarTrek.com. He is the host of Engage: The Official Star Trek Podcast. He is a member of the New York Film Critics Circle.

Previously he was the movies editor at UGO.com. He wrote, produced and appeared in films such as Ultrachrist! and Body/Antibody.

In 2004, he was named IFC's Ultimate Film Fanatic of the North East. In 2012, he appeared on episode 36 of the podcast On Cinema as a special guest to review the movie 300.

In June 2026, Annalee Newitz announced the resurrection of Starlog magazine as editor-in-chief, with its first issue set to arrive on newsstands November 13, 2026, in concert with the launch of a weekly podcast from Jordan Hoffman and Dave Gonzales that launched on June 24, 2026.
