= The O'Neill Brothers =

The O'Neill Brothers are an American instrumental piano duo from New Prague, Minnesota, comprising brothers Tim and Ryan O'Neill. They are also known as Pianissimo Brothers. Their most famous covered songs are Rainbow Connection, Tomorrow (The Sun Will Come Out), Moonlight Sonata, Unforgettable and As Time Goes By, shown on their own and Pianissimo Brothers albums, used for relaxing music for weddings, sleeping, bubble baths, doctor’s offices, winter, Earth Day, Thanksgiving and other stuff, and Silver and Gold, The Christmas Song (Chestnuts Roasting on an Open Fire), Have Yourself a Merry Little Christmas and Carol of the Bells for Christmas albums.

The brothers both began piano lessons at age five and attended the University of Notre Dame before deciding to pursue a career together in 1997. The pair began self-releasing albums, many based on themes such as marriage, Christmas, patriotism, and styles such as traditional Irish music. The group found success selling their music on the television station QVC in addition to making appearances on other networks. Their 2000 release From the Heart saw a resurgence in popularity in 2005, peaking at #21 on the Billboard Pop Catalog chart. The group has sold over one million albums total.

== Discography ==
- 2000 From the Heart [Box Set]
- 2002 A Day to Remember: Instrumental Music for Your Wedding
- 2002 Coming Home: An O'Neill Brothers Christmas
- 2002 Look Within
- 2002 Meeting of the Waters
- 2002 One
- 2002 P.S. I Love You
- 2002 Sweet Dreams
- 2002 Through the Years
- 2004 Here Come the Irish
- 2004 Inspiration
- 2004 Notre Dame Experience
- 2004 On Broadway with the O'Neill Brothers
- 2004 The Journey
- 2005 Holiday Music: Instrumental Songs for the Holiday Season, Vol. 1
- 2005 Holiday Music: Instrumental Songs for the Holiday Season, Vol. 2
- 2005 Holiday Music: Instrumental Songs for the Holiday Season, Vol. 3
- 2005 A Day To Remember: Music For Your Beach Wedding
- 2006 A Day to Remember, Vol. 2
- 2006 Celebrate America
- 2006 Someone You Love
- 2006 Reflections
- 2006 Holiday Home
- 2007 Day Break
- 2008 Autumn
- 2008 Harvest
- 2008 Songs of Faith
- 2009 Songs of Serenity - Quiet Time, A Spiritual Renewal, and Inspirational Music
- 2010 Lullabies by Request
- 2011 Christmas Lullabies
- 2012 Notre Dame Lullabies
- 2013 Spirit of Notre Dame [2 CD Set]
- 2013 Sunday Morning
- 2016 Instrumental Tribute to Prince
