= Electric Youth (album) =

1989 album by Debbie Gibson

Studio album by Debbie Gibson
- Released: January 24, 1989
- Recorded: 1988
- Studios: Z Studio, Brooklyn; Sorcerer Sound, NYC; The Hit Factory, NYC; Soundtrack, NYC
- Genres: Pop; dance-pop; bubblegum pop; pop rock
- Length: 58:17
- Label: Atlantic
- Producers: Deborah Gibson; Fred Zarr

Debbie Gibson chronology
| Out of the Blue (1987) | Electric Youth (1989) | Anything Is Possible (1990) |

Singles from Electric Youth
- 1. "Lost in Your Eyes" Released: January 6, 1989; 2. "Electric Youth" Released: March 17, 1989; 3. "No More Rhyme" Released: June 2, 1989; 4. "We Could Be Together" Released: August 7, 1989

Electric Youth is the second studio album by American singer-songwriter Debbie Gibson, released on January 24, 1989, by Atlantic Records. It is the highest-charting album of Gibson's career, staying at the top of the US Billboard 200 albums chart for five weeks, and reaching number 8 on the UK Albums Chart.

== Composition ==
As with her debut album, Out of the Blue, all tracks were written by Gibson, and she single-handedly produced six of the tracks. She was also given half of the production credits on one track alongside Fred Zarr who produced the other four. The album, like her first, contains mainly bubblegum-pop songs, though other, more mature styles are touched upon.

=== Singles ===
Electric Youth spawned four singles, the first being "Lost in Your Eyes," which became her second No. 1 on the Billboard Hot 100 and stayed there for three weeks. "Electric Youth", the album's title track, just missed the Top 10, reaching No. 11. "No More Rhyme" followed, ending its run at No. 17, and "We Could Be Together" charted at No. 71.

== Reception ==
Professional ratings
Review scores
| Source | Rating |
|---|---|
| AllMusic | 3.5/5 stars |
| Robert Christgau | C+ |
| Rolling Stone | 3/5 stars |

In their review of the album, Billboard stated that "some of the innocent charm of her triple -platinum debut has been replaced by slick sophistication, but Gibson's knack for churning out punchy, well-crafted tunes is stronger than ever. As indicated by the first single, "Lost In Your Eyes," the album concentrates more on ballads and midtempo tunes than the dance oriented debut did, but there are still plenty of toe- tappers here. Gibson leaves no doubt that her first-time success was not a fluke."

Cashbox noted that "it’s hard to fault Gibson here. She’s definitely evolving into a stronger, more mature artist. Her songs range from catchy musical romps with an edge of emotion and serious thought (“Electric Youth”), to outright teenaged sentimentality (“Lost In Your Eyes”). Throughout, however, you sense a young artist with the chance to hang tough as a pop star in the future. This record should continue her huge success."

Rolling Stone praised the album, stating that "Electric Youth sounds so bright and giddy that one could easily dismiss Debbie as just a kinder; gentler teen idol for the waning Eighties. That would be a mistake, if only because Gibson writes her own material. This eighteen-year-old New Yorker is heir to the great tradition of the Brill Building...the best pop music always mirrors its time, and anyone who's interested in a jolt of the here and now during this era of cultural nostalgia should plug into Electric Youth."

Spin commented that "hidden inside the chirpy, MIDI-ized backing tracks is an insurgent message that will have a greater emotional impact on current culture than a truckload of Tracy Chapman's...it would be impossible for radio to ignore Debbie. Either on her own, or in conjunction with arranger-producer Fred Zarr, she rings the cash register of mass-market radio, sounding sometimes like a young Olivia Newton-John and at other moments ("Lost In Your Eyes") like a hybrid of Karen Carpenter and Barbara Streisand."

AllMusic concedes that "the result is slickly produced teen pop, like her debut, but it's not as squeaky clean or as compulsively likeable. "Lost in Your Eyes" is a pretty ballad that showcases her songwriting skills, her clear voice, and her talent on the piano. "Electric Youth" is a bouncy, frenetic song that is ridiculously sing-alongable...It's teen pop at its best: it makes you feel young, it makes you want to sing, it makes you want to fall in love."

== Commercial success ==
In the US, the album was certified 2× Platinum by the RIAA and sold over 4 million copies worldwide. Gibson promoted the album with "The Electric Youth World Tour" in 1989. In parallel with the album, she created an Electric Youth perfume under Revlon, and various makeup essentials for young girls through Natural Wonder Cosmetics, one of her sponsors at the time, distributed throughout the U.S.

The album also inspired an original stage musical of the same name which premiered at the Starlight Dinner Theatre (formerly Mark Two Dinner Theatre) in Orlando, Florida. Dean Parker wrote the book and Gibson co-produced.

== Reissues ==
The album was included in the 2017 box set We Could Be Together, with seven remixes as bonus tracks.

A special four-disc digipack edition was released by Cherry Red Records on November 26, 2021. This release includes two remix CDs and a DVD containing the album's four music videos and the live video Live Around the World.

== Track listing ==
All tracks are written by and produced by Deborah Gibson, except where indicated.

This Side
| No. | Title | Producer(s) | Length |
|---|---|---|---|
| 1. | "Who Loves Ya Baby?" | Zarr | 4:00 |
| 2. | "Lost in Your Eyes" | | 3:32 |
| 3. | "Love in Disguise" | | 4:18 |
| 4. | "Helplessly in Love" | | 4:10 |
| 5. | "Silence Speaks (a Thousand Words)" | | 3:38 |
| 6. | "Should've Been the One" | | 5:09 |
| Total length: | | | 24:48 |

That Side
| No. | Title | Producer(s) | Length |
|---|---|---|---|
| 7. | "Electric Youth" | Zarr | 4:55 |
| 8. | "No More Rhyme" | Zarr | 4:13 |
| 9. | "Over the Wall" | | 3:57 |
| 10. | "We Could Be Together" | Gibson; Zarr | 5:34 |
| 11. | "Shades of the Past" | Zarr | 4:54 |
| Total length: | | | 23:36 48:27 |

CD bonus tracks
| No. | Title | Producer(s) | Length |
|---|---|---|---|
| 12. | "We Could Be Together" (Campfire Mix) | Gibson; Zarr | 5:33 |
| 13. | "No More Rhyme" (Acoustic Mix) | Zarr | 4:13 |
| Total length: | | | 58:16 |

Deluxe Digipack Edition bonus tracks
| No. | Title | Writer(s) | Producer(s) | Length |
|---|---|---|---|---|
| 14. | "Electric Youth" (Special DJ Edit) | | | 3:41 |
| 15. | "Electric Youth" (Latin Edit) | | | 3:54 |
| 16. | "We Could Be Together" (7" Mix) | | | 5:38 |
| 17. | "Without You" (Single Version) | Gibson; Tatsuro Yamashita | Andrew Zulla | 4:19 |
| Total length: | | | | 76:15 |

Deluxe Digipack Edition Disc 2: Electric Youth Remixes
| No. | Title | Length |
|---|---|---|
| 1. | "Electric Youth" (The Electro Mix) | 6:38 |
| 2. | "Electric Youth" (The Electric Dub Gone Haywire) | 6:34 |
| 3. | "Electric Youth" (The Electric Dub) | 6:33 |
| 4. | "Electric Youth" (Deep House Mix) | 7:36 |
| 5. | "Electric Youth" (Shep's House Dub) | 5:56 |
| 6. | "Electric Youth" (Shep's House Beats) | 6:03 |
| 7. | "Electric Youth" (House Edit) | 3:57 |
| 8. | "Electric Youth" (7" Alternative Latin Edit) | 3:54 |
| Total length: | | 47:15 |

Deluxe Digipack Edition Disc 3: Remixes & B-sides
| No. | Title | Writer(s) | Length |
|---|---|---|---|
| 1. | "Silence Speaks (a Thousand Words)" (Acoustic Mix) | | 3:41 |
| 2. | "Lost in Your Eyes" (Piano & Vocal Mix) | | 3:35 |
| 3. | "Over the Wall" (Dub) | | 4:27 |
| 4. | "We Could Be Together" (House Mix) | | 7:21 |
| 5. | "We Could Be Together" (House of Trix) | | 5:58 |
| 6. | "We Could Be Together" (Radio Mix) | | 4:33 |
| 7. | "We Could Be Together" (Live Mix - From Video) | | 7:48 |
| 8. | "We Could Be Together" (Edit) | | 4:41 |
| 9. | "Without You" (Instrumental) | Gibson; Yamashita | 4:19 |
| 10. | "In the Still of the Night (I'll Remember)" | Fred Parris | 3:54 |
| 11. | "Come Home" (The Wonder Years) | | 2:05 |
| 12. | "Love in Disguise" (Instrumental) | | 4:19 |
| Total length: | | | 56:45 |

Deluxe Digipack Edition DVD
| No. | Title | Writer(s) | Length |
|---|---|---|---|
| 1. | "Lost in Your Eyes" (Music Video) |
| 2. | "Electric Youth" (Music Video) |
| 3. | "No More Rhyme" (Music Video) |
| 4. | "We Could Be Together" (Music Video) |
| 5. | "Who Loves Ya Baby?" (Live) |
| 6. | "Over the Wall" (Live) |
| 7. | "Lost in Your Eyes" (Live) |
| 8. | "Don't Flirt with Me" (Live) |
| 9. | "Dance to the Music" (Live) | Sly Stone |
| 10. | "Love Under My Pillow" (Live) |
| 11. | "Should've Been the One" (Live) |
| 12. | "We Could Be Together" (Live) |
| 13. | "No More Rhyme" (Live) |
| 14. | "Electric Youth" (Live) |

== Charts ==
=== Weekly charts ===
Weekly chart performance for Electric Youth
| Chart (1989) | Peak position |
|---|---|
| Australian Albums (ARIA) | 10 |
| Canada Top Albums/CDs (RPM) | 11 |
| European Albums (European Top 100 Albums) | 31 |
| Finnish Albums (Suomen virallinen albumilista) | 32 |
| German Albums (Offizielle Top 100) | 48 |
| Icelandic Albums (Tónlist) | 10 |
| Japanese Albums (Oricon) | 15 |
| New Zealand Albums (RMNZ) | 47 |
| Swedish Albums (Sverigetopplistan) | 43 |
| Swiss Albums (Schweizer Hitparade) | 21 |
| UK Albums (Official Charts) | 8 |
| US Billboard 200 | 1 |
| US Top 200 Albums (Cashbox) | 1 |

=== Year-end charts ===
Year-end chart performance for Electric Youth
| Chart (1989) | Position |
|---|---|
| Australian Albums (ARIA) | 37 |
| Canada Top Albums/CDs (RPM) | 29 |
| US Billboard 200 | 16 |
| US Top 50 Pop Albums (Cashbox) | 12 |

Weekly chart performance for Electric Youth (Deluxe Edition)
| Chart (2021) | Peak position |
|---|---|
| UK Independent Albums (Official Charts) | 39 |

== Certifications and sales ==
| Region | Certification | Certified units/sales |
|---|---|---|
| Australia (ARIA) | Platinum | 70,000^{^} |
| Hong Kong (IFPI Hong Kong) | Gold | 10,000^{*} |
| Japan (RIAJ) | Platinum | 200,000^{^} |
| United Kingdom (BPI) | Gold | 100,000^{^} |
| United States (RIAA) | 2× Platinum | 2,000,000^{^} |
Summaries
| Worldwide | — | 4,000,000 |
^{*} Sales figures based on certification alone.^{^} Shipments figures based on certification alone.

== Personnel ==
Musicians

- Debbie Gibson - lead and backing vocals, piano, keyboards, additional keyboards, drum programming
- Fred Zarr - keyboards, drum programming, piano (tracks 1–3, 5, 7–8, 10–11)
- Greg Savino - keyboards (track 6)
- Leslie Ming - hi hat (tracks 1, 3, 8–9)
- Bashiri Johnson - percussion (tracks 1–5, 7–11)
- Adam Tese - percussion, saxophone (track 6)
- Lou Appel - drums (tracks 5–6)
- Ira Siegel - acoustic guitar, electric guitar (tracks 1, 4–5, 7–11)
- Tommy Williams - electric guitar, acoustic guitar (tracks 2–3, 6)
- Kirk Powers Burkhardt - bass (tracks 2–3, 5–6)
- Bob Osman - cello (track 8)
- Jeff Smith - saxophone (tracks 1, 8)
- Roger Rosenberg - flute solo (track 5)
- Ed Palermo - tenor saxophone (Cadillac Horns) (tracks 8, 10)
- Bud Burridge - trumpet (Cadillac Horns) (tracks 8, 10)
- Matt Finders - trombone (Cadillac Horns) (tracks 8, 10)
- Carrie Johnson - backing vocals (tracks 1, 3, 7–8, 10–11)
- Libby Johnson - backing vocals (tracks 1, 7, 10–11)
- Keeth Stewart - backing vocals (tracks 1, 9–10)
- Tim Lawless - backing vocals (tracks 8, 11)
- Sandra St. Victor - backing vocals (track 8)
- Linda Moran - backing vocals (track 10)

Production

- Debbie Gibson - arranger, mixing (tracks 1–7, 9–10)
- Fred Zarr - arranger, mixing (tracks 1–3, 5, 7–8, 10–11)
- Don Feinberg - recording engineer
- Phil Castellano - recording engineer, mix engineer, additional engineering, mixing (tracks 2–3, 5, 8, 11)
- Bill Scheniman - recording engineer (track 6)
- Mario Salvatti - additional engineering (track 6)
- Rich Travali - additional engineering (track 9)
- Matt Malles - assistant engineer
- Bill Esses - assistant engineer, additional engineering, programming engineer (tracks 1–10)
- Jim Goatley - assistant engineer, assistant mix engineer (tracks 2, 5–6, 8)
- Bob Rosa - mix engineer, mixing (tracks 1–2, 6–7, 9)
- Bob "Bassie" Brockmann - mix engineer, mixing (tracks 4, 10)
- Tom Vercillo - assistant mix engineer (tracks 1–3, 6–7, 9–11)
- Chris Floberg - assistant mix engineer (tracks 3, 10–11)
- David Lebowitz - assistant mix engineer (tracks 3–4, 10–11)
- Diane Gibson - management
- Douglas Breitbart - executive producer
- Albert Watson - photography
- Greg Porto - Logo Design
- Fran Cooper - makeup
- Kerry Warn - hair
- Freddie Leiba - stylist
- David Salidor - publicity
- Abbe Rosenfeld - session coordinator
- Howie Weinberg - mastering (Masterdisk)
