= Fox on the Box =

1982 album by Village People

Studio album by Village People
- Released: July 1, 1982
- Recorded: 1982
- Studio: Mediasound, New York City
- Genre: Dance-pop, disco, funk
- Length: 33:30
- Label: RCA, Casablanca (Japan)
- Producer: Jacques Morali, Henri Belolo

Village People chronology
Renaissance (1981)	Fox on the Box (1982)	Sex Over the Phone (1985)

Professional ratings
Review scores
Source	Rating
AllMusic	2/5 stars

Fox on the Box is the eighth studio album by Village People, released in 1982. It is the group's only album to not be released in the US, the UK or France. It was released in Australia on RCA Records, in South America, and in Germany, Scandinavia and Spain. In Japan, the album was released by Casablanca Records. The album sold poorly and failed to chart anywhere.

The album is most notable for the return of original lead singer Victor Willis, who once again also co-wrote the songs. Ray Simpson (who had replaced Willis) is featured on two tracks, "Everybody Loves the Funk" and "Radio Freak" and the G.I., Alex Briley sings lead on the ballad "Lonely Lady". Willis sang lead on all the other songs, which had an edgy funk-oriented feel (and included an early hip hop track, "Play Bach"). Another change of members was Mark Lee who replaced construction worker David Hodo. Willis did not resume live performances, however. Miles Jaye would take over as the "Cop" for the group after the departure of Ray Simpson, who was fired following a disagreement with Morali during the recording of this album.

The album was released on CD in 1997, now titled In the Street, and containing a bonus track, "America"—a stand-alone 1983 single featuring Miles Jaye (who replaced Ray Simpson), which had previously only been released in Australia.

Although Jeff Olson joined Village People in 1980, this was the first album that he appeared in a cowboy costume.

== Track listing ==
=== Side one ===
1. "Fox on the Box" (Belolo, Morali, Blake, Willis) – 3:43
2. "In the Street" (Belolo, Morali, Willis) – 4:47
3. "Lonely Lady" (Schmidt, Belolo, Morali, Willis) – 3:54
4. "Everybody Loves the Funk" (Belolo, Morali, Willis) – 4:28

=== Side two ===
1. "Success" (Belolo, Morali, Willis) – 5:58
2. "Spaced Out" (Belolo, Morali, Willis) – 5:32
3. "Play Bach" (Belolo, Morali, Willis) – 4:37
4. "Radio Freak" (Belolo, Morali, Blake, Willis) – 3:09
5. "America" (Zarr, Belolo, Morali, Hurtt) – 3:43 (only on CD release In the Street)
