= Renaissance (Village People album) =

Studio album by Village People
- Released: June 1981
- Recorded: 1981
- Studio: Record Plant (Los Angeles)
- Genre: New wave
- Length: 30:18
- Label: RCA
- Producer: Jacques Morali, Henri Belolo (executive)

Village People chronology
Can't Stop the Music (1980)	Renaissance (1981)	Fox on the Box (1982)

Singles from Renaissance
- 1. "Do You Wanna Spend the Night" Released: 1981; 2. "5 O'Clock in the Morning" Released: 1981; 3. "Action Man" Released: 1982; 4. "Jungle City" Released: 1982

Professional ratings
Review scores
Source	Rating
AllMusic	1/5 stars

Renaissance is the seventh studio album by American disco group Village People, released in 1981 by RCA Records. The album marked a departure for the group, with a more new wave-influenced sound and less of an emphasis on disco.

This would also be their last album to feature David Hodo and Ray Simpson.

== Background ==
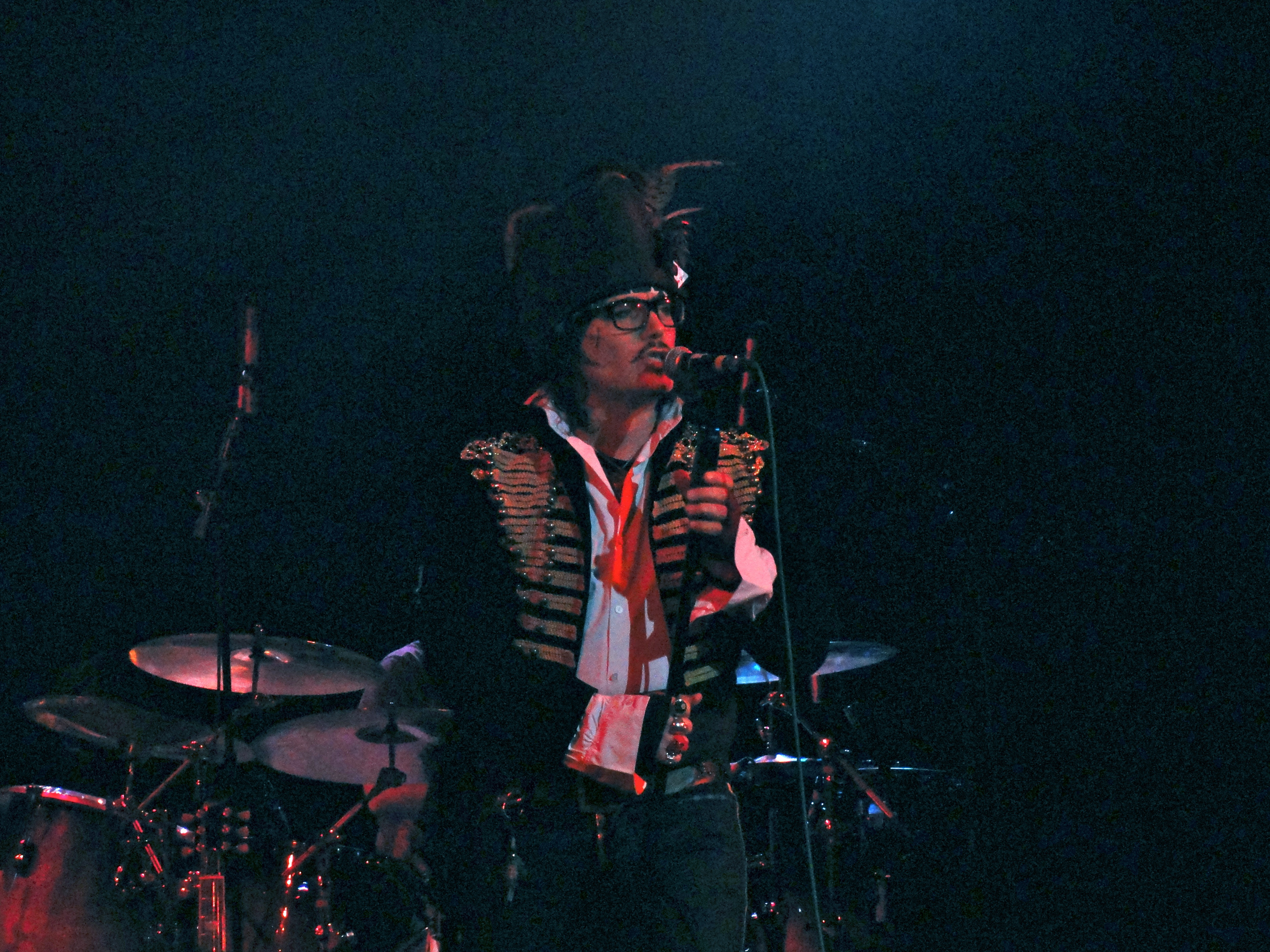
For Renaissance, the Village People abandoned their original costumes and changed their image to model that of New Romantics, such as Adam Ant (above).

In 1980, the Village People had starred in the motion picture Can't Stop the Music, but the film was released after disco's peak and was subsequently a box office flop, even winning the first ever Razzie Award for Worst Picture. The group was signed to Casablanca Records, but when the label went out of business, RCA signed the group in 1981 with plans to rebrand them as a new wave band. David Hodo, the "construction worker", recalled in a 2014 interview with PopMatters that the RCA executives were "passing around ideas" for how to re-style the group. One idea was for each member to wear a colorful, monochromatic fringed leather bodysuit, which Hodo deemed "awful". The second look that the label proposed, which the group agreed to, was a "New Romantic look, which was [like] Adam Ant and Spandau Ballet. That was the better of the two choices."

The group's former lead singer, Victor Willis, had departed two years before, and lead vocals were now performed by alternating members of the group.

== Writing credits ==
Renaissance was co-written by the Village People's producer Jacques Morali and the VP Band.

The VP Band included the following musicians:

- Dan Schmidt (keyboardist for Oingo Boingo)
- Howie Epstein (bassist for Tom Petty and the Heartbreakers)
- Dennis "Fergie" Frederiksen (singer for Toto)

== Reception ==
=== Critical ===
In a review for Billboard magazine, the editors praised the album's "mellifluous harmonies" and commended the lead single, "5 O'Clock in the Morning", as "an ethereal piece of work", but criticized the album as "not edifying".

In retrospective reviews, Stephen Thomas Erlewine of AllMusic gave the album one star out of five and deemed it an "embarrassment that never should have seen the light of day", further opining that the album, despite its age, "lacks kitsch value", but singling out "5 O'Clock in the Morning" as a highlight of the album. Christopher Bickel of Dangerous Minds retrospectively deemed "Food Fight" a "stupefying punk rock masterpiece", comparing its style to Devo and "Weird Al" Yankovic, and opined that, "had the Village People followed Renaissance with an album full of songs in the 'Food Fight' vein, they easily could have been the greatest fake punk band of all time."

=== Commercial ===
"5 O'Clock in the Morning" became the group's first hit single in Italy.

== Track listing ==
All tracks written by Jacques Morali, V.P. Band, Henri Belolo and Dennis Frederiksen.

Side one

1. "(Do You Wanna) Spend the Night" – 5:05
2. "5 O'Clock in the Morning" – 4:59
3. "Fireman" – 4:59
4. "Jungle City" – 3:50

Side two

1. "Action Man" – 3:08
2. "Big Mac" – 2:27
3. "Diet" – 3:19
4. "Food Fight" – 2:31

The tracklist above was used in all countries except on original pressings in the United States and Canada, where "5 O'Clock in the Morning" appeared before "(Do You Wanna) Spend the Night". Current versions of the album replace the full length version of "Spend the Night" with its radio edit, 3:32 in length.

== Charts ==
Chart performance for Renaissance
Chart (1981–82)	Peak position
Australian Albums (Kent Music Report)	12
Italian Albums (Musica e Dischi)	4
New Zealand Albums (RMNZ)	34
US Billboard 200	138

Annual chart rankings for Renaissance
Chart (1982)	Rank
Italian Albums (Musica e Dischi)	19
