= Christopher Bickel =

American filmmaker

- Citizenship: United States
- Occupations: Film director; screenwriter
- Organization: Films Colacitta
- Style: B-movies, Horror, Girl Gangs, Cult Films
- Website: cuttored.com

Christopher Bickel is an American underground filmmaker from West Columbia, South Carolina, where he films most of his movies. Bickel has directed films such as Pater Noster and the Mission of Light (2024), Bad Girls (2021), and The Theta Girl (2017). Bickel's films are "low-budget," being financed and produced independently. He has expressed frustration with distribution issues and competition with mainstream big-budget studio films. Bickel's films are available on Blu-Ray, and on streaming services such as Night Flight Plus.

Bickel was named the 2020 Free Times "Best Filmmaker in Columbia." His 2024 film Pater Noster and the Mission of Light was official selection at the 2024 film festivals: Another Hole in the Head Film Festival, South Carolina Underground Film Festival, and BizarroLand Film Festival. Bickel's filmmaking influences include George Romero, Gregg Araki, John Waters, HG Lewis, Russ Meyer, David Lynch, Kenneth Anger, and Jack Hill. He has hosted a "Lowbrow Cinema Explosion" at the Nickelodeon Theatre in Columbia.

Bickel has also directed music videos for artists such as Demiser, MNRVA, and Boo Hag. Prior to entering filmmaking, Bickel wrote and conducted interviews for the counterculture website Dangerous Minds and for the punk culture 'zine Maximum Rocknroll. In the 1990s and early 2000s, Bickel sang in the South Carolina punk bands In/Humanity and Guyana Punch Line, and released music for a solo project called Anakrid. He is an avid collector of vinyl records and has released vinyl soundtracks to certain of his films.

== Filmography ==
- Pater Noster and the Mission of Light (2024)
- Bad Girls (2021)
- The Theta Girl (2017)
- Teenage Caligula (short) (2016)
