= Ray Stephens (singer) =

American singer and actor (1954–1990)

- Born: December 14, 1954
- Died: October 4, 1990 (aged 35)
- Genres: Pop
- Occupations: Singer, actor
- Formerly of: Village People

Ray Stephens (December 14, 1954 – October 4, 1990) was an American singer and actor best known for starring in the 1980s TV series, The Great Space Coaster, as Roy. In 1985, Stephens became the lead singer of Village People and toured England with the group that year. His sole recording with the group was their album, Sex Over the Phone.

Stephens is heard singing the tune "Cat's Eye" during the closing credits of the 1985 Stephen King film of the same title; however, he is incorrectly listed in the closing credits as "Ray Stevens."

== Death ==
He died at age 35 on October 4, 1990, from AIDS.
