= Sex Over the Phone (song) =

Single by Village People

from the album Sex Over the Phone
- Released: 1985
- Recorded: 1984
- Genre: Dance pop
- Length: 4:22
- Label: Casablanca
- Songwriters: Jacques Morali, Bruce Vilanch, Fred Zarr
- Producer: Jacques Morali

Village People singles chronology
"Magic Night" (1980)	"Sex Over the Phone" (1985)	"New York City" (1985)

"Sex Over the Phone" is a song recorded by American disco group Village People, released as the first single from their ninth album, Sex Over the Phone (1985). It reached number 59 on the UK Singles Chart. The BBC banned the song because of its content - credit card dirty phone calls.

== Content ==
The lyrics deal with phone sex and the video for the song is about that. The song reflects the overall theme of the Village People album Sex Over the Phone, which are "safer sex" practices. There are two versions of this song: the original (4:22) version has a mid-tempo beat, and the club versions (4:15 and 6:25) have a faster beat.

== Charts ==
Chart (1985)	Peak position
Finland (Suomen virallinen lista)	25
UK Singles (OCC)	59
West Germany (Official German Charts)	40
