= Debbie Gibson =

American singer, songwriter, and actress (born 1970)

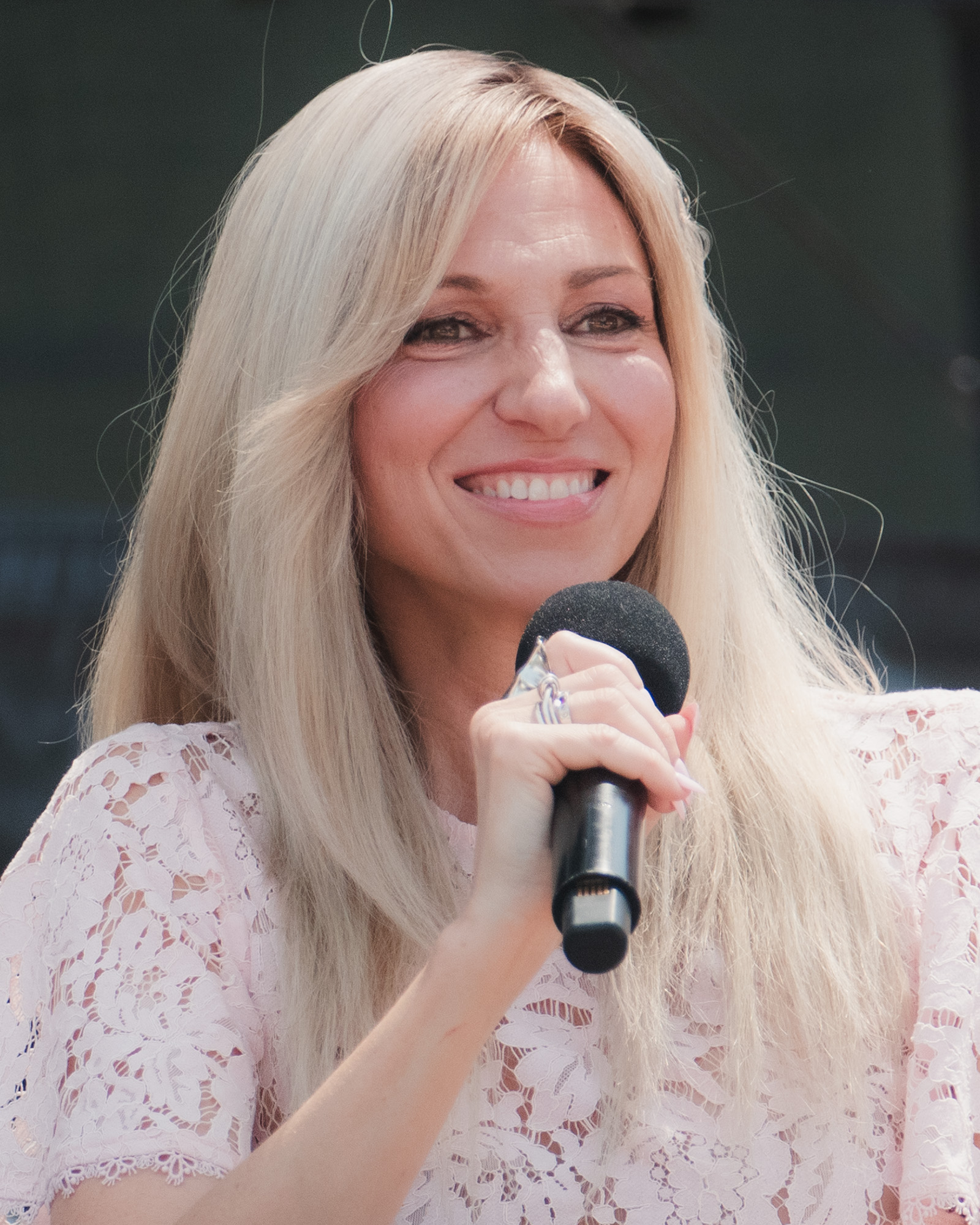
- Gibson in 2026

Background information
- Born: Deborah Ann Gibson; August 31, 1970 (age 56); New York City, U.S.
- Genres: Pop; dance-pop; pop rock; freestyle
- Occupations: Singer; songwriter; actress; television personality
- Instruments: Vocals; piano; guitar
- Years active: 1983–present
- Labels: Atlantic; SBK/EMI; SMEJ; Dauman Music; StarGirl
- Website: debbiegibsonofficial.com

Deborah Ann Gibson (born August 31, 1970) is an American singer, songwriter, and actress. She released her debut album Out of the Blue (1987) at age 16, writing and largely producing the material. The album spawned several international hits, later being certified triple platinum by the Recording Industry Association of America. One of those singles, "Foolish Beat", made Gibson the youngest female artist to write, produce, and perform a Billboard Hot 100 number-one single. Her double-platinum second album Electric Youth (1989) gave Gibson another U.S. number-one hit with "Lost in Your Eyes". Gibson is the sole songwriter on all of her singles to reach the top 20 of the Billboard Hot 100. She was recognized by ASCAP as Songwriter of the Year, along with Bruce Springsteen, in 1989. As of 2025, she has sold over 16 million albums worldwide.

Gibson continued to record and release music throughout the 1990s and 2000s. In 2006, she reached number 24 on the U.S. adult contemporary chart with "Say Goodbye", a duet with Jordan Knight, and in 2017 achieved her highest-charting appearance in more than 25 years in her duet with Sir Ivan, "I Am Peaceman". Gibson's 2020 single "Girls Night Out" became her first top five and highest-charting hit after 30 years. In addition to music, she then has had starring roles on Broadway and touring musicals including playing Eponine in Les Misérables and Sandy in Grease as well as television and independent film work.

== Early life ==
Gibson was born in Brooklyn, New York City, on August 31, 1970, the third of Diane (née Pustizzi) and Joseph Gibson's four daughters. Her father, who enjoyed singing, was originally named Joseph Schultz and was abandoned by his mother as a boy; his biological mother married a man with the surname Gibson before putting Joseph in an orphanage. Gibson grew up in suburban Merrick, New York, on Long Island. She describes herself as being of "Italian/Sicilian and part German and possibly some Russian" descent. She studied piano under American pianist Morton Estrin. She is a graduate of Sanford H. Calhoun High School in Merrick.

== Music career ==
In 1983, Gibson submitted a cassette recording of her original composition "I Come from America" to WOR for the station's song contest. After she won a cash prize of $1,000 from the contest, her mother convinced a relative to loan her $10,000 to convert the family garage into a recording studio.

=== 1986–1989 ===
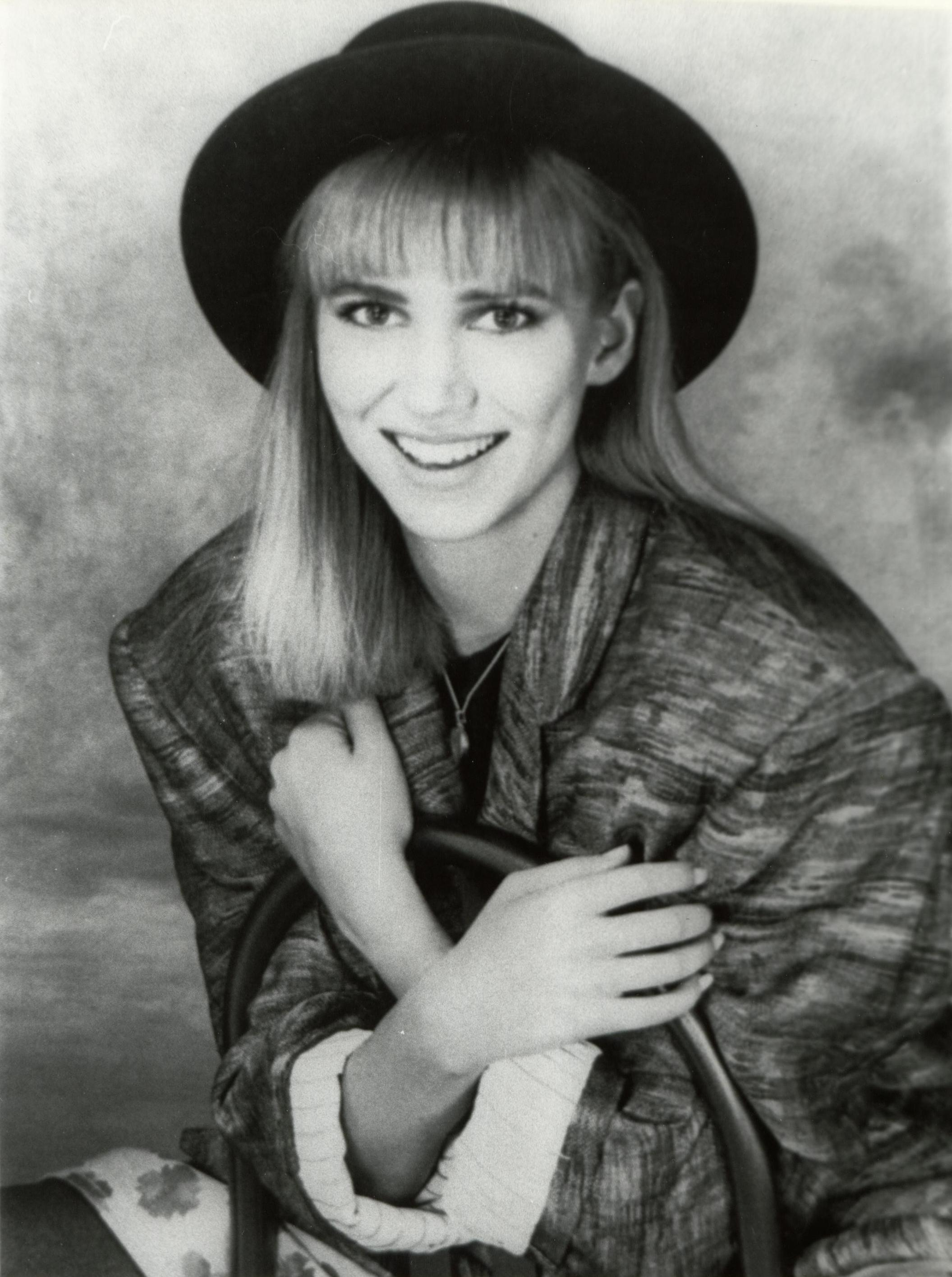
Debbie Gibson in the late 1980s, when her music career began

After Gibson had written and produced her own material for years, her demonstration tape that had been submitted to a radio personality was shared with an executive at Atlantic Records. Solely on the basis of Gibson's original song "Only in My Dreams", she was signed to a development deal and began a promotional tour of club venues throughout the United States.

For much of 1986 and the beginning of 1987, Gibson built a songwriting catalog while continuing to play club dates. During her promotional tour, she continued attending classes at Calhoun High School and later graduated as an honor student. Diane Gibson, Debbie's mother and manager, accompanied her daughter on many of these track dates. Diane said, "We played dance clubs, straight clubs, and gay clubs."

The single "Only in My Dreams" was released in December 1986 and landed in the Billboard Hot 100 chart in May 1987, peaking at number four that September. Atlantic Records and Gibson worked to complete her first album following the single's success. After the success of "Only in My Dreams", "Shake Your Love" was released as the follow-up single and reached the Billboard top five. The "Shake Your Love" video was choreographed by Paula Abdul, the first time that MTV visited Gibson on a video shoot.

In 1987, while performing at nightclubs throughout the United States, Gibson recorded her debut album, Out of the Blue. Along with producer Fred Zarr, Gibson wrote, recorded and produced it in four weeks. Four singles from the album reached the top five of the Hot 100 chart: "Only in My Dreams", "Shake Your Love", "Out of the Blue" and the number-one hit "Foolish Beat", followed by "Staying Together", which only reached number 22. "Foolish Beat" set a record, making Gibson at 16 the youngest artist to write, produce and perform a Billboard number-one single, as cited in the 1988 Guinness Book of World Records. She remains the youngest female artist to have done so. Out of the Blue became a hit album, and she had success in the UK and Southeast Asia, filling stadiums with her Out of the Blue Tour. By the end of 1988, Out of the Blue had gone triple platinum.

The music-video compilation Out of the Blue was certified platinum by the RIAA, and the concert tour video was certified double platinum. In October 1988, Gibson sang the national anthem for Game 1 of the Major League Baseball World Series. Electric Youth was released in early 1989 and spent five weeks at number one on the Billboard 200. The first single released, "Lost in Your Eyes", reached number one on the Hot 100 for three weeks, garnering her another achievement as the youngest female to have both an album and single simultaneously at number one. She shared the 1989 ASCAP Songwriter of the Year Award with Bruce Springsteen. Subsequent singles from the album were "Electric Youth" (number 11), "No More Rhyme" (number 17) and "We Could Be Together" (number 71). The Electric Youth album was certified double platinum by the RIAA. The successful Electric Youth Tour and Live Around the World VHS (double platinum) followed.

=== 1990–2001 ===
Gibson recorded two more albums for Atlantic Records: Anything Is Possible (1990) and Body, Mind, Soul (1993). The former's title song, cowritten with Motown mainstay Lamont Dozier, peaked at number 26 on Billboard's Hot 100 in 1991. Subsequent singles from Anything Is Possible failed to chart on the Hot 100, although "One Step Ahead" scored on the Hot Maxi Singles and Hot Dance charts, peaking at numbers 21 and 18, respectively. During that time, Gibson became a member of the supergroup that recorded the charity single "Voices That Care", which peaked at number 11 on the Hot 100 chart. In 1992, she contributed a version of "Sleigh Ride" to the charity album A Very Special Christmas 2, which hit number 7 on the Billboard album chart and was certified Double Platinum for shipment of two million copies.

In 1995, Gibson signed with EMI's SBK Records division and recorded her only album for the label, Think with Your Heart. It was an adult contemporary-heavy album consisting of piano and keyboard ballads recorded predominantly with the London Philharmonic Orchestra. The album's producer, Niko Bolas, Neil Young's frequent coproducer, was producing the reunion album for veteran punk band Circle Jerks and invited Gibson to a recording session for that band's album Oddities, Abnormalities and Curiosities. She sang background vocals on the song "I Wanna Destroy You", as well as appearing at and participating in the Circle Jerks' performance at the punk venue CBGB, wearing one of the band's T-shirts and sharing a microphone with frontman Keith Morris. In 1998, she sang the song "I Do", which is featured on the soundtrack to the film The Naked Man. The lyrics were composed by the film's cowriter Ethan Coen. The soundtrack has never been released.

After parting company with EMI, Gibson formed her own record label, Espiritu, to release her original material. Her sixth album, Deborah (1997), marked her full return to pop. Deborah includes the lead single "Only Words". The dance edit version of the song became a top 40 Hot Dance Music/Club Play hit. The album's other single, the ballad "Naturally", only sold 20,000 copies in the U.S.

In 2001, Gibson released her seventh album on her new record label, Golden Egg, titled M.Y.O.B. It featured three singles: the sensual pop song "What You Want", the Latin-infused dance-pop song "Your Secret" and the bass-heavy "M.Y.O.B." The album also included the sultry Latin-flavored smooth jazz song "In Blue", a vintage-style ballad "Wishing You Were Here", "Jaded" and a remix of "M.Y.O.B." with the background vocals of her two nieces.

=== 2005–2009 ===
In 2005, Gibson cowrote and recorded a song titled "Someone You Love" with the O'Neill Brothers, with whom she released an updated, acoustic version of her number-one hit "Lost in Your Eyes". An Emmy-nominated PBS special titled The O'Neill Brothers: Piano for Someone You Love aired in 2005.

The March 2005 issue of Playboy featured a nude pictorial of Gibson, coinciding with the release of her single, "Naked". She has said that the magazine had asked her five times to pose for them since she turned 18. She agreed to pose to revamp her image, describing how a casting representative had phoned her agent, not realizing that Gibson had long outgrown her teenager image. The single peaked at number 35 on the Billboard Hot Single Sales chart in March 2005. In 2006, Gibson embarked on a tour with the O'Neill Brothers for the Someone You Love Tour in 2006. "Lost in Your Eyes" was revamped with an acoustic sound and the song "Someone You Love" was written and performed by Gibson and the O'Neill Brothers. These two songs also appeared on the O'Neill Brothers album Someone You Love.

Gibson's single "Say Goodbye", featuring dance-pop artist Jordan Knight, found some success n in the Soft AC and Hot AC radio formats, becoming the third-most added single during the summer of 2006. It debuted at number 35 on the Hot Contemporary chart, peaking at number 24 in early September. The same year, Gibson appeared in the independent film Coffee Date with Wilson Cruz and Jonathan Silverman and provided the soundtrack song "Sounds Like Love".

On November 14, 2006, Gibson released the song "Famous" on her official website. The song was written by Gibson and Tiziano Lugli and was produced by Lugli.

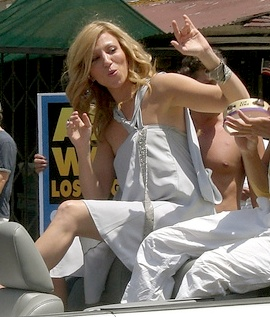
Gibson at LA Pride 2007

Gibson founded Camp Electric Youth, a children's summer day camp, which ran from July 7–18, 2008. It claims to be the first camp of its kind in the Los Angeles area. The camp was reportedly attended by "over 120 talented singers, actors, and dancers" from around the world.

Gibson served as a judge for the online talent competition Total Pop Star along with Andrew Van Slee (producer and judge) and Joey Lawrence. The first season ran from November 12, 2007, to May 30, 2008, although it was later extended to June. The show ended abruptly during its second season. In May 2008, Gibson performed her 1980s hits, along with her Broadway role songs, during a three-run week at Harrah's in Atlantic City, New Jersey. She hosted and performed for Spotlightlive '80s Karaoke Experience in New York, singing songs such as "Only in My Dreams", "Out of the Blue", "Love Shack" (an original hit for the B-52's) and "9 to 5". She performed with Samantha Fox, Tiffany and Rick Astley at the Colisée Pepsi in Quebec City, Canada on April 10, 2009.

On March 9, 2009, Gibson released a new song titled "Already Gone" on her official website and ReverbNation, written by Gibson and produced by Fred Coury. It was accompanied by a music video, released on March 13, 2009, produced by Guy Birtwhistle and directed by John Knowles, which starred Birtwhistle, Gibson and Steve Valentine.

=== 2010–present ===
Gibson became a spokesperson for Murad's Resurgence Skin Care and plays piano and sang a line of the song "Cougar". Gibson's song "Rise", from the documentary 3 Billion and Counting, was included on the shortlist for an Academy Award for Best Original Song in 2010. In the summer of 2011, she released Rise on iTunes and performed it on Good Morning America in New York. Gibson performed as Mother Nature in Cirque Dreams' Jungle Fantasy at Foxwoods Resort Casino from July 27 to September 1, 2010.

In 2010, the album Ms. Vocalist, released via Sony Japan, reached the Top 10 on the Billboard Japan chart. Gibson covered J-pop tunes for the album that were originally sung by Japanese artists such as Chage and Aska ("Say Yes"), Yutaka Ozaki ("I love you"), Miho Nakayama and WANDS (Sekaijū no Dare Yori Kitto), among others, plus a Japanese/English version of her number-one hit "Lost in Your Eyes" and a duet with Eric Martin. The first single from the album, "I Love You", hit number 1 on the international cable radio chart on November 3, 2010.

In January 2011, Gibson wrote, performed and produced the song "Snake Charmer" for the film Mega Python vs. Gatoroid. During the summer of 2011, Gibson toured with fellow 1980s pop princess Tiffany. In June 2011, Gibson appeared in Katy Perry's music video "Last Friday Night (T.G.I.F.)" alongside several other guest stars. On August 27, 2016, Gibson starred in an original Hallmark Channel film, Summer of Dreams, about a former pop star trying to make a comeback who finds herself better suited as a school's choir director. She also recorded a song titled "Wonderland" for the film.

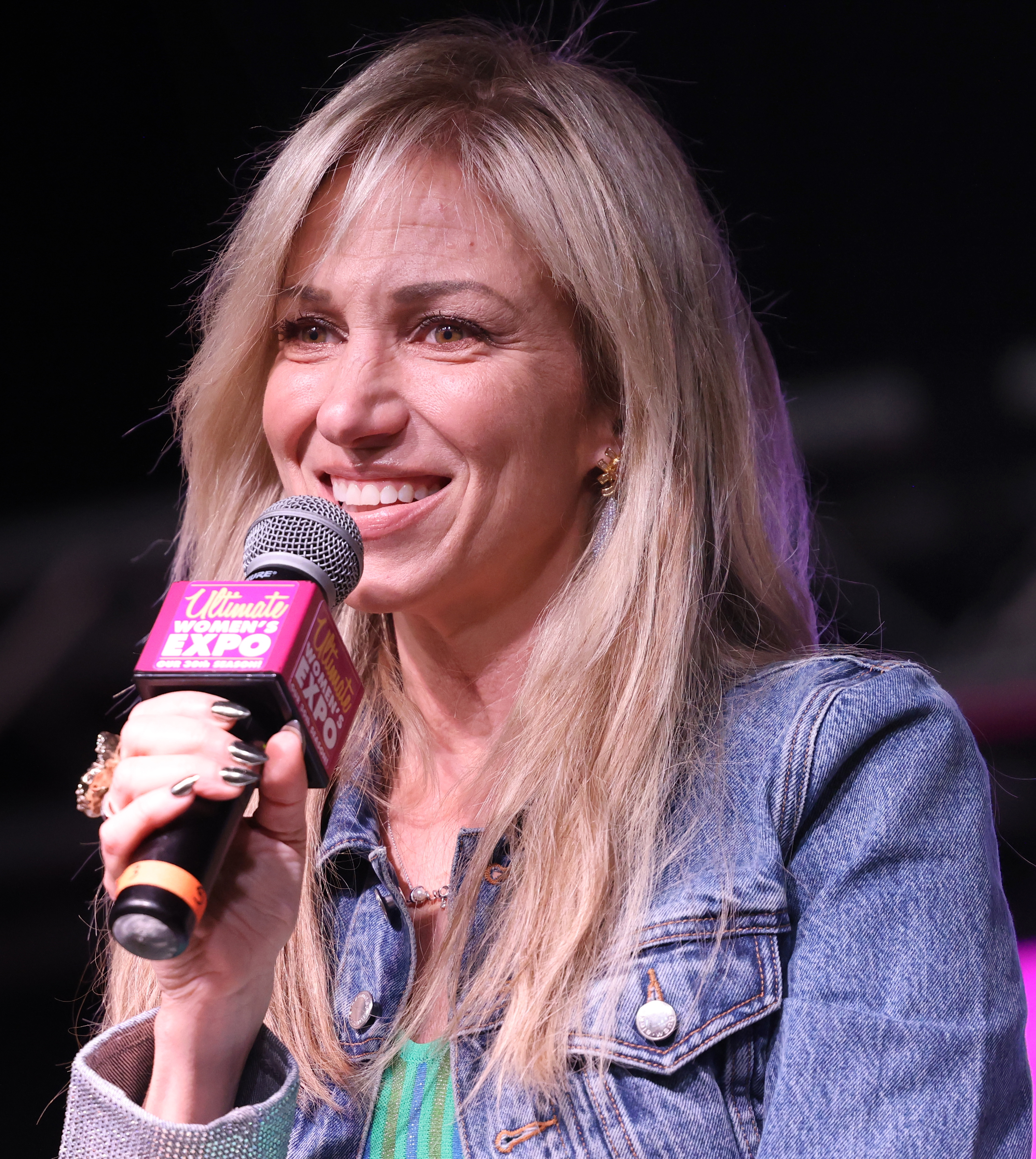
Gibson in 2025

In June 2017, Billboard Gibson achieved her highest-charting hit in more than 25 years in her duet with Sir Ivan on "I Am Peaceman", which hit number 26 on the Billboard Dance Club chart. In June 2018, Gibson appeared in the music video of American heavy-metal band Voices of Extreme's cover version of "Foolish Beat". In March 2019, Gibson hosted a special program on SiriusXM Radio's '80s on 8 channel to celebrate the 30th anniversary of her Electric Youth album, during which she played each song from the album in sequence, accompanied by personal stories surrounding each song.

On May 2, the Mixtape Tour commenced in Cincinnati, Ohio. Performers on the tour included Gibson, Tiffany, Salt-N-Pepa and Naughty by Nature, with New Kids on the Block billed as the headline performers. The tour grossed $53.2 million and sold 662,911 tickets over 55 dates. On June 7, 2019, Gibson released the new pop anthem "Girls Night Out", and its music video was shot in Las Vegas. The song peaked at number four on the Billboard Dance Club chart. On August 20, 2021, Gibson released the album The Body Remembers, her first studio recording of original songs since M.Y.O.B.. It contained a new version of "Lost in Your Eyes" with Joey McIntyre.

Gibson performed at the 2025 Rose Parade singing "Electric Youth" as part of the grand finale with Betty Who and the Debbie Allen Dance Academy dancers.

Gibson released her memoir, Eternally Electric: The Message in My Music, on September 9, 2025. The book debuted at number 22 on the Publishers Weekly Bestseller List, selling 4,478 units.

== Theatre ==
Gibson debuted on Broadway in 1992, playing Éponine Thénardier in Les Misérables. She then went to London and starred as Sandy Dombroski in Grease—a role for which 800 other people tried out before producers chose Gibson—in a West End production. The show broke box office sales records. The single version of "You're the One That I Want", a duet with Craig McLachlan, taken from the original cast recording, reached number 13 on the UK Singles Chart in 1993.

After returning to the United States, she appeared in the Broadway touring production, this time playing Rizzo. She played Fanny Brice in a revamped Funny Girl tour. She has had many successful theater credits; she was among the many actresses who took the starring role of Belle in the Broadway production of Beauty and the Beast. She replaced Kerry Butler in September 1997 and was in the show until June 1998, when Kim Huber then succeeded her. She also starred in the critically lauded production of Gypsy (in a production staged at the Paper Mill Playhouse). Gibson starred as Louise Hovick opposite Broadway legend Betty Buckley. She participated in the national tour of Joseph and the Amazing Technicolor Dreamcoat, where she played the Narrator, and starred as Cinderella in the national tour of Rodgers & Hammerstein's musical with Eartha Kitt as the Fairy Godmother. In October 2002, she starred as Velma Kelly in the Boston production of Chicago. In 2003, she played Sally Bowles in the Broadway revival of Cabaret. From March to April 2004, she played the role of Marta in the UCLA Reprise! production of Company.

Gibson starred as Anna Leonowens in Cabrillo Music Theatre's production of the Richard Rodgers and Oscar Hammerstein II musical The King and I, which began October 17, 2008, in the Kavli Theatre at the Thousand Oaks Civic Arts Plaza and ran through October 26.

== Film and television ==
Gibson made her big screen debut in the 1984 supernatural comedy Ghostbusters. Gibson co-hosted Nickelodeon's first Kids' Choice Awards in 1988, alongside Tony Danza, Brian Robbins, and Dan Schneider. She co-starred with actor Lorenzo Lamas in the low-budget action/adventure film Mega Shark Versus Giant Octopus, produced by The Asylum and released on May 19, 2009. The film drew in two million viewers on Syfy in 2009. Its trailer became a viral hit, scoring over one million hits on MTV.com and YouTube. The film premiered at the 2009 Cannes Film Festival. Gibson's former music rival Tiffany had her film Necrosis (or Blood Snow) premiere at Cannes that year as well. Gibson and Tiffany starred in a Syfy original movie entitled Mega Python vs. Gatoroid, aired on January 29, 2011. The pairing was suggested by Tiffany, who wanted to play-off their supposed rivalry. Gibson reprised her role as Emma McNeil in the 2014 film Mega Shark Versus Mecha Shark.

She starred in the Up TV movie The Music in Me alongside Gloria Reuben in 2015. The film also featured an original song called "Promises", written and performed by Gibson. In mid-2003, Gibson was a judge on the American Idol spin-off American Juniors, which lasted one season. In January 2006, she joined the cast of Skating with Celebrities on Fox Television, partnered with Canadian former world-champion figure skater Kurt Browning. She was voted out in the third episode. She competed on the fifth season of The Celebrity Apprentice, which began airing on February 19, 2012. On the fourth task, she won $50,000 for her charity, Children International, before being fired on April 1, 2012, after the seventh task.

In 2017, Gibson was one of the celebrities competing on the 25th season of Dancing with the Stars. She was paired with first-time pro-dancer, Alan Bersten. On September 26, 2017, Gibson and Bersten were the second couple eliminated coming in 12th place. In September 2018, Gibson starred in the Hallmark Channel film Wedding of Dreams, a sequel to 2016's Summer of Dreams. In 2019 and 2020, Gibson was a judge on Nickelodeon's America's Most Musical Family.

Gibson made a guest appearance on season 5 episode 10 of the Netflix series Lucifer, which premiered on May 28, 2021. In the episode titled "Bloody Celestial Karaoke Jam", she plays a mother who sings "Every Breath You Take" with Lucifer Morningstar (Tom Ellis) in an interrogation room. In 2023, she competed in season nine of The Masked Singer as "Night Owl". She was eliminated on "ABBA Night" alongside Howie Mandel as "Rock Lobster".

== Image and influence ==
In tandem with her second album Electric Youth (1989), she created a perfume called Electric Youth that was distributed by Revlon, as well as other makeup essentials for young girls that were distributed nationwide through Natural Wonder Cosmetics. The 1989 song "Debbie Gibson Is Pregnant with My Two-Headed Love Child" by Mojo Nixon and Skid Roper was released as a single; MTV refused to air the accompanying video, which starred Winona Ryder as Gibson. The song peaked at No. 16 on Billboard's Modern Rock Tracks chart.

Gibson's fashion trademark was her hats, usually a black pork-pie style. She also made popular wearing tight, rolled-up jeans, vests over a T-shirt, friendship bracelets and two Swatch watches as on the back cover of her album Electric Youth and in her music video "Staying Together". Her influences were Madonna and Olivia Newton-John, though she has often stated she admires Elton John and Billy Joel as favorite artists and was asked to sing and perform live with both at the former's Madison Square Garden concert in October 1988, which she did. Gibson appeared on the covers of numerous teen magazines such as Tiger Beat.

== Personal life ==
Gibson had a history of panic attacks beginning when she was 16.

Over the years, Gibson has been the target of stalkers. Robert Bardo, who was convicted of murdering actress Rebecca Schaeffer in 1989, had a wall in his house adorned with pictures of Gibson and Tiffany Darwish. In May 1998, Michael Falkner, a disgruntled fan from Eau Claire, Wisconsin, was arrested outside Manhattan's Palace Theatre, where Gibson was performing in the live-musical adaptation of Disney's Beauty and the Beast. That was after Gibson received threatening letters, emails, and faxes from Falkner who used the alias 'Starcade'. In 2008, Gibson filed for a restraining order against Spanish taxi driver Jordi Bassas Puigdollers, who had stalked her since 2002. However, a temporary restraining order was not issued and a court date was set to determine if a restraining order was appropriate. The proceeding was dismissed when Gibson failed to show up for the hearing.

Gibson was engaged to music executive Jonathan Kanterman, but it was called off in 2003. She was also in a relationship with Rutledge Taylor from 2008 to 2019. Gibson has never married and has no children, a choice she admitted to considering before being diagnosed with Lyme disease in 2013. The infectious disease made her lose substantial weight. In 2014, in response to fans' concern about her weight loss, Gibson said that she had developed symptoms of Lyme disease in early 2013.

In 2016, shortly after the death of singer Prince, she appeared on Oprah: Where Are They Now?, and spoke out about her past drug use.

"I really feel like I haven't fully articulated it till now and really spoke candidly till now... When I heard the news about Prince and the fact that it might have been prescription drug-related, I really had a moment of, like, 'That's awful and that's sad—and I can relate.' ...unfortunately, 90% of the entertainment community can relate. I remember being on the road at, like, 25, touring with theater and doing my own cocktail of Tylenol PM and Xanax. It's like, "Oh, I found a way to make the Xanax last longer with the Tylenol PM... it's as simple as that, and that is how performers get in so much trouble."

== Discography ==
Studio albums

- Out of the Blue (1987)
- Electric Youth (1989)
- Anything Is Possible (1990)
- Body, Mind, Soul (1993)
- Think with Your Heart (1995)
- Deborah (1997)
- M.Y.O.B. (2001)
- Colored Lights: The Broadway Album (2003)
- Ms. Vocalist (2010)
- The Body Remembers (2021)
- Winterlicious (2022)

== Filmography ==
=== Film ===
Year	Title	Role	Notes
1984	Ghostbusters	Birthday Girl in Tavern on the Green	
1986	Sweet Liberty	Girl at Amusement Park	
1986	The Manhattan Project	Extra	
1998	My Girlfriend's Boyfriend	Melissa Stevens	
1999	My X-Girlfriend's Wedding Reception	Lisa	
2001	Soulkeeper	Herself	
2004	Celeste in the City	Monica	TV movie
2006	Coffee Date	Melissa	
2007	Body/Antibody	The Caseworker	
2009	Mega Shark Versus Giant Octopus	Emma MacNeil	
2011	Mega Python vs. Gatoroid	Dr. Nikki Riley	TV movie
2012	U B Da Judge	Herself	Short
2012	Rock of Ages	Rocker	
2014	Mega Shark Versus Mecha Shark	Emma MacNeil	
2015	The Music in Me	Jessica	TV movie
2016	Summer of Dreams	Debbie Taylor	TV movie
2018	Wedding of Dreams	Debbie Taylor	TV movie
2022	The Class	Miranda	

=== Television ===
Year	Legacy	Role	Notes
1988	Kids' Choice Awards	Herself/Co-Host	Main Co-Host
1988	The New Hollywood Squares	Herself/Panelist	Episode: "Episode #2.76"
1989	American Music Awards	Herself/Co-Host	Main Co-Host
1991	Beverly Hills, 90210	Herself	Episode: "East Side Story"
1992	Street Justice	Gabrielle	Episode: "Backbeat"
1994	Win, Lose or Draw	Herself	Recurring Guest
1995	Kidsongs	Herself	Episode: "Fun With Manners"
1995	Step by Step	Christi Rose	Episode: "Roadie"
1998	The Unexplained	Herself	Episode: "Dangerous Obsessions"
1998	Celebrity Profile	Herself	Episode: "Jennifer Love Hewitt"
2000	Where Are They Now?	Herself	Episode: "Teen Idols"
2001	I Love the '80s	Herself	Episode: "I Love 1988"
2001	Top Ten	Herself	Episode: "Pop Princesses"
2001	The Test	Herself/Panelist	Episode: "The First Date Test"
2001	Mad TV	Herself	Episode: "Episode #7.1"
2002	Where Are They Now?	Herself	Episode: "80s Teen Idols"
2002	Weakest Link	Herself/Contestant	Episode: "Music Makers"
2002	That '80s Show	Janice	Episode: "Beach Party"
2003	American Juniors	Herself/Judge	Main Judge
2003	E! True Hollywood Story	Herself	Episode: "Paula Abdul"
2003	Hollywood Squares	Herself/Panelist	Recurring Guest
2003	I Love the '80s Strikes Back	Herself	Episode: "1983"
2005	Mad TV	Herself	Episode: "Episode #11.8"
2006	Skating with Celebrities	Herself	Episode: "Debut"
2006	Criss Angel Mindfreak	Herself	Episode: "Celebrity Seance"
2008	Deal or No Deal	Herself	Episode: "Episode #3.26"
2009	The Heyman Hustle	Herself	Episode: "The 80's Are Back as Debbie Gibson Does the Heyman Hustle"
2009	Rita Rocks	Cindy Schotz	Episode: "Old Friends"
2010	Celebrity Ghost Stories	Herself	Episode: "Pantoliano's Terror & Debbie Gibson's Idol"
2011	Nail Files	Herself	Episode: "The Queen of Nails"
2012	Celebrity House Hunting	Herself	Episode: "Debbie Gibson"
2012	The Celebrity Apprentice	Herself/Contestant	Contestant: Season 12
2014	Sing Your Face Off	Herself/Judge	Main Judge
2014	Acting Dead	Roberta	Recurring Cast
2015	The Meredith Vieira Show	Herself/Panelist	Episode: "Episode #1.175"
2016	Celebrity Name Game	Herself/Celebrity Player	Episode: "Debbie Gibson & Marg Helgenberger 1–3"
2017	Dancing with the Stars	Herself/Contestant	Contestant: Season 25
2019–20	Entertainment Tonight	Herself/Guest Co-Host	Recurring Guest Co-Host
2019–20	America's Most Musical Family	Herself/Judge	Main Judge
2020	Celebrity Show-Off	Herself	Episode: "The Stori Continues"
2020	Penn & Teller: Fool Us	Herself	Episode: "Penn's Stupid Rope Trick"
2021	I Can See Your Voice	Herself	Episode: "Episode #1.11"
2021	Lucifer	Mrs. Bitner	Episode: "Bloody Celestial Karaoke Jam"
2022	Greatest 80s Pop Videos	Herself	Episode: "1988"
2022	Secret Celebrity Renovation	Herself	Episode: "Debbie Gibson"
2022	#THEDISH	Herself	Episode: "Cake Bossy" & "Tattoo Far"
2022	Soundcheck	Herself	Episode: "Debbie Gibson"
2022	The Wheel	Herself/Piano Expert	Episode: "Fish N' Chips & Gold Medal Flips"
2023	Criss Angel's Magic with the Stars	Herself	Episode: "Enigma"
2023	The Masked Singer	Herself/Night Owl	Season 9 contestant; episode: "ABBA Night"
2023	Name That Tune	Herself/Contestant	Episode: "Girls Just Want to Have Fun"
2023	Celebrity Wheel of Fortune	Herself/Contestant	Episode: "Tim Gunn, Debbie Gibson, and Luis Guzman"

=== Music videos ===
Year	Song	Artist	Role
1989	"Liberian Girl"	Michael Jackson	Herself
1991	"Faces"	Run-D.M.C.	Herself
2011	"Last Friday Night (T.G.I.F.)"	Katy Perry	Tiffany Terry
2019	"Boys in the Band (Boy Band Anthem)"	New Kids on the Block	Herself

=== Documentary ===
Year	Song
1992	"Dying for a Smoke"
2005	"The Child Star Jinx"
2012	"A Child's Cry"
2022	"Worst to First"

== Bibliography ==
- Gibson, Debbie (September 9, 2025). Eternally Electric: The Message in My Music. New York: Gallery Books. ISBN 978-1668056769.

== Awards and nominations ==
- 1988: Billboard Year-End – Top Pop Album Artist Female
- 1989: Debut Album of the Year – Out of the Blue – New York Music Awards
- 1989: Debut Artist of the Year – New York Music Awards
- 1989: ASCAP Songwriter of the Year (tied with Bruce Springsteen)
- 1989: Nominated for Best Pop Female Vocalist – American Music Awards
- 1989: Billboard Year-End – Top Pop Album Artist Female (runner-up)
- 1990: Nominated for Favorite Female Music Performer – People's Choice Awards
- 1990: Rock Producer of the Year – American Songwriter Awards
- 1990: Artist of the Year – New York Music Awards
- 1990: Song of the Year – "Lost in Your Eyes" – New York Music Awards
- 1990: Best Pop Female Vocalist – New York Music Awards
- 2014: Inductee – Long Island Music Hall of Fame
- 2015: Nominated for Best Supporting Actress (Comedy) in Acting Dead – Indie Series Awards
- 2015: Lifetime Achievement Award – The PATH Fund's Rockers on Broadway
- 2018: 425th Golden Palm Star – Palm Springs Walk of Stars
- 2018: Named one of Billboard's Top 60 Female Artists of All-Time
- 2019: Recipient of the NGLCC/American Airlines ExtrAA Mile Award
- 2024: Honoree – Women's International Music Network She Rocks Awards
