= Fred Zarr =

- Born: Frederick I. Zarr; September 26, 1955 (age 71)
- Origin: Brooklyn, New York City, United States
- Genres: Hi-NRG; garage house; post-disco; dance-pop; electro; reggae
- Occupations: Musician; composer; record producer; synthesist; arranger
- Instruments: keyboards; synthesizers; piano; drum machine; Bass synthesizer

Frederick I. Zarr (born September 26, 1955) is an American musician, record producer, composer, synthesist and arranger based in Brooklyn, New York. The CEO of BiZarr Music, Inc., he works alongside numerous artists, singers, songwriters, musicians, & audio engineers at his Brooklyn recording studio - “Z Studio”.

== Production ==
Among notable artists with whom Zarr has collaborated musically include Madonna, on her self-titled début album; Village People, co-writing "Sex Over the Phone"; Debbie Gibson on various albums and songs including "Only in My Dreams"; Samantha Fox; Up Front; Pretty Poison; and Eartha Kitt's 1983 dance club hit, "Where Is My Man". Zarr's music is also heard on various radio and television commercials (which air in the United States and France).

He has also worked with the following artists:

=== Albums ===
Year	Work	Info
Written, co-written by Zarr
1983	Planet Patrol by Planet Patrol	with John Robie and Arthur Baker
1984	Break Dance Party by Break Machine	with Jacques Morali, Henri Belolo, Keith Rodgers
1985	Sex Over the Phone by Village People	with Bruce Vilanch, Jacques Morali and Ray Stephens
Produced, co-produced by Zarr
1987	Out of the Blue by Debbie Gibson	Keyboards & Programming
1988	I Wanna Have Some Fun by Samantha Fox	tracks "Ready For This Love" and "Walking On Air"
1988	Catch Me I'm Falling by Pretty Poison	tracks "Your Eyes" and "Shine"; also keyboards
1989	Electric Youth by Debbie Gibson	Keyboards & Programming
1989	Sheree by Sheree Jeacocke	four tracks
1990	Paintings in My Mind by Tommy Page	
1990	Anything Is Possible by Debbie Gibson	track "Stand Your Ground"; also keyboards and drum programming
Keyboards and synthesizers provided by Zarr
1983	Madonna by Madonna	all 8 tracks
1983	Wotupski!?! by John Benitez	four tracks
1986	Abstract Emotions by Randy Crawford	
1987	One from the Heart by Jocelyn Brown	three tracks
1989	One Bright Day by Ziggy Marley	four tracks

=== Singles ===
Year	Work	Info
Written, co-written by Zarr
1983	"Where Is My Man" by Eartha Kitt	with Jacques Morali and Bruce Vilanch; also producer and synthesizer player
1985	"Cat's Eye" by Ray Stephens	with Jacques Morali and Bruce Vilanch; also producer
1987	"My Only Want Is You" by Johnny Kemp	also Keyboards
1988	"Tell Me" by Kate Gengo	also producer
1991	"99 Reasons" by Jo Beth Taylor	also producer & Keyboards
1996	"Whatever You Want" by Tina Turner	single from the album Wildest Dreams
Produced, co-produced by Zarr
1988	"Extra Ordinary Love" by Regina	
1989	"R.O.I." by Tommy Page	
1989	"Take It Back" by Arthur Baker	also synthesizer
1989	"Count To Ten" by Arthur Baker	also synthesizer
Keyboards and synthesizers provided by Zarr
1981	"Out Come The Freaks" by Was (Not Was)	
1982	"I'll Do Anything for You" by Denroy Morgan	
1983	"Walking on Sunshine" by Rockers Revenge	
1983	"Body Work" by Hot Streak	from Breakin’
1983	"I.O.U." by Freeez	
1983	"Happiness Is Just Around the Bend" by Cuba Gooding, Sr.	
1983	"Sweet Talk" by Sheena Easton	from album Best Kept Secret
1985	"Interview" by Carly Simon	synthesizers; from album Spoiled Girl 1985 L L “Say You Love Me” By (Marla Adler)
1985	"All Hung Up" by Angela Cappelli	
1986	"Gotta See You Tonight" by Barbara Roy	
1986	"Nail It to the Wall" by Stacy Lattisaw	
1986	"Celebrate" by Subject	
1986	"Mercury Rising" by The Pointer Sisters	
1987	"Love Will Save The Day" by Whitney Houston	from album Whitney
1987	"For Everything You Are" by Dionne Warwick	from album Reservations for Two
1987	"Caught In The Act" by Jocelyn Brown	
1987	"Don't You Want Me?" by Jody Watley	
1987	"Space Balls" by The Spinners	from Spaceballs (The Soundtrack)
1987	"Who Found Who" by Jellybean featuring Elisa Fiorillo	
1987	"Scars of Love" by TKA	
1988	"Most Of All" by Jody Watley	
1988	"Inside Outside" by Cover Girls	

== Musical collaborations ==
- Phil Ramone
- Richard Perry
- Reggie Lucas
- Kashif
- Arthur Baker
- Jellybean
- Madonna
- Stephen Bray
- Shep Pettibone
- John Luongo
- Mark Kamins
- Johnny Kemp
- Stew Lane and the Untouchables
- Tina B
- Steve Thompson
- M & M Productions
- François Kevorkian
- Taylor Dayne
- Jacques Morali
- Mick Jagger
- The Rolling Stones
- Jerry Ragovoy
- Four Tops
- Toni Basil
- Fleetwood Mac
- Sheree Jeacocke
- Brenda K. Starr (Beat Street)
- Marshall Crenshaw
- Jon Batiste
- Ben E. King
- Herbie Hancock
- Eddie Money
- Taj Mahal
- Evelyn King
- Tee Scott
- Tom Moulton
- Bert Reid
- Raymond Reid
