= Milli Vanilli discography =

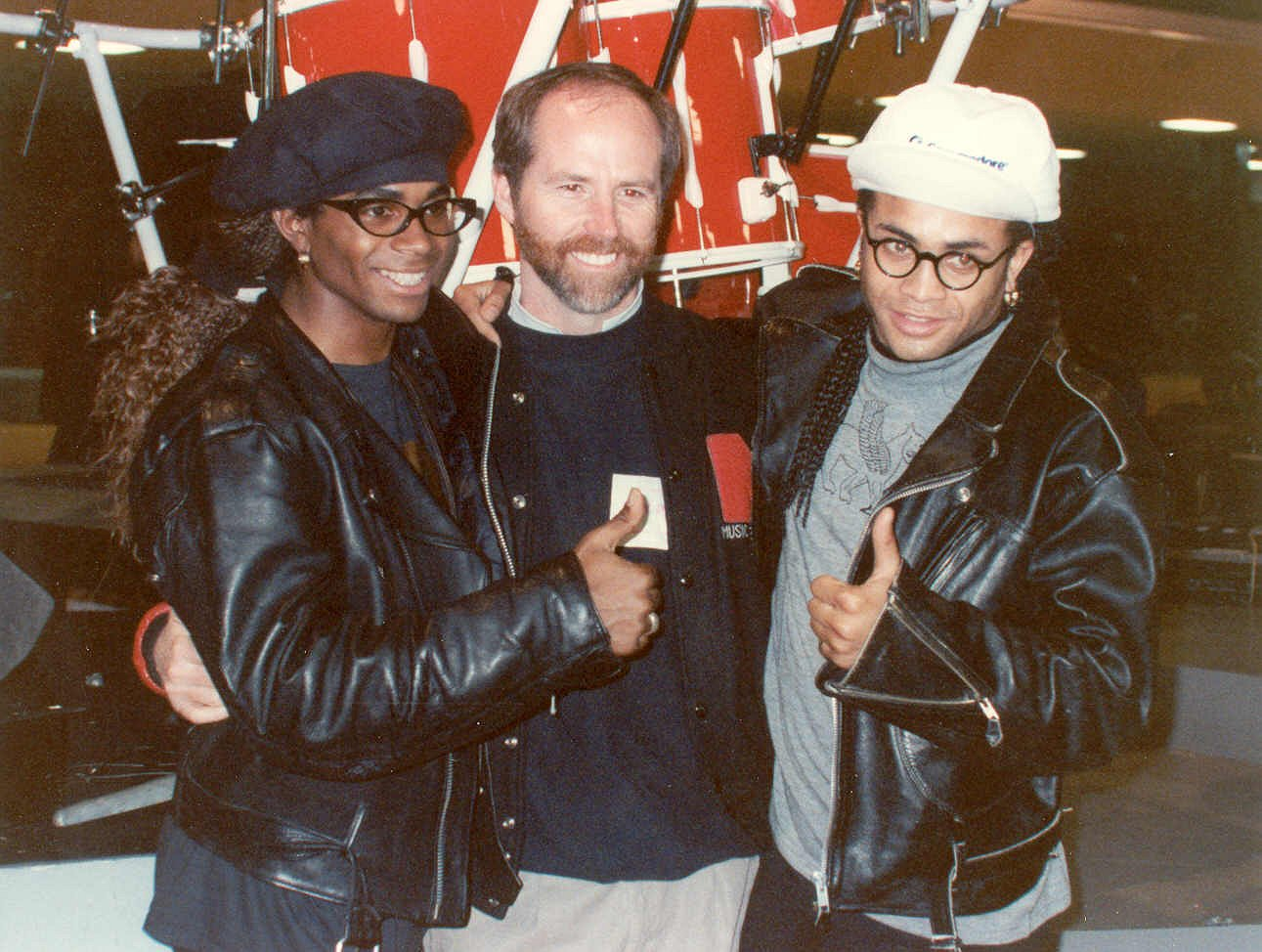
- Fab Morvan (left) and Rob Pilatus (right) pose with Grammy president C. Michael Greene at the 1990 Grammy Awards rehearsal in February 1990
- Studio albums: 3
- Compilation albums: 2
- Singles: 7
- Video albums: 1
- Music videos: 7

This is a discography of Milli Vanilli, a pop/dance music project formed by Frank Farian in Germany in 1988, fronted by Fab Morvan and Rob Pilatus.

The discography consists of two studio albums solely by Milli Vanilli released in different parts of the world, two remix albums released worldwide, an album by The Real Milli Vanilli released shortly after the exposure, an album by Rob & Fab, the two original members, and the singles.

Milli Vanilli's first album, All or Nothing, was released in Europe in mid-1988. The success of the record brought attention of Arista Records who signed the duo and released their album in the US with different name, Girl You Know It's True. In the United Kingdom, the double album 2 X 2 was released; the first CD being the original All or Nothing and the second the remix album.

All of the singles released from the album made it into Billboard Hot 100 top 5. The first single, "Girl You Know It's True", reached No. 2. The following single, "Baby Don't Forget My Number", became the duo's first number one song, with the next two singles—"Blame It on the Rain" and "Girl I'm Gonna Miss You"—topping the chart as well. The final single, "All or Nothing", reached No. 4.

== Albums ==
=== North American studio albums ===
List of albums, with selected chart positions and certifications
Title	Details	Peak chart positions									Certifications
Title	Details	GER	AUT	CAN	IRE	NLD	NZ	SWI	UK	US	Certifications
Girl You Know It's True	Released: 7 March 1989; Label: Arista; Formats: CD, cassette, vinyl	—	—	1	—	—	—	—	—	1	CAN: Diamond; US: 6× Platinum

=== International studio albums ===
List of albums, with selected chart positions and certifications
Title	Details	Peak chart positions									Certifications
Title	Details	GER	AUT	CAN	IRE	NLD	NZ	SWI	UK	US	Certifications
All or Nothing	Released: 14 November 1988; Label: Hansa; Formats: CD, cassette, vinyl	4	3	—	15	36	1	5	37 (Note: All or Nothing reached #37 in the UK when originally issued as a stand-alone release and The U.S.-Remix Album: All or Nothing was not issued as a stand-alone release in the country. A release titled 2×2 that packaged both albums together reached #6 in the UK.)	—	GER: Gold; NZ: Platinum; UK: Silver

=== Remix albums ===
List of albums, with selected chart positions and certifications
Title	Details	Peak chart positions								Certifications
Title	Details	GER	AUS	CAN	NLD	NZ	SWI	UK	US	Certifications
The U.S.-Remix Album: All or Nothing	Released: 26 June 1989; Label: Hansa; Formats: CD, cassette, vinyl	4	1	—	1	1	3	—	—	AUS: 2× Platinum; NZ: Platinum
2×2	Released: 1989 (UK and France only); Label: Cooltempo; Formats: CD, 2×cassette, 2×vinyl	—	—	—	—	—	—	6	—	UK: Platinum
The Remix Album (US remix album, titled Quick Moves in Canada)	Released: 15 May 1990; Label: Arista; Formats: CD, cassette, vinyl	—	68	43	—	—	—	—	32	US: Gold
"—" denotes a recording that did not chart or was not released in that territory.

=== Compilation albums ===
- Maximum Millli Vanilli: Hits That Shook the World (1990) (promotional album)
- Best of the Best/Greatest Hits (2006)
- Girl You Know It's True: The Best of Milli Vanill (2013)

=== Unreleased albums ===
- Keep On Running (1991)

=== Other related albums ===
- The Real Milli Vanilli - The Moment of Truth (1991)
- Try 'N' B – Try 'N' B (1992)
- Rob & Fab – Rob & Fab (1993)
- Fab Morvan – Love Revolution (2003)

== EPs ==
- 4 Hits: Milli Vanilli (2011) – reached No. 197 on the US Billboard 200 in 2024

== Singles ==
List of singles, with selected chart positions and certifications, showing year released and album name
Title	Year	Peak chart positions										Certifications	Album
Title	Year	GER	AUS	AUT	CAN	NLD	NZ	SPA	SWI	UK	US	Certifications	Album
"Girl You Know It's True"	1988	1	88	1	3	2	13	1	2	3	2	GER: Gold; CAN: Gold; FRA: Silver; SWE: Gold; UK: Silver; US: Platinum	All or Nothing / Girl You Know It's True
"Baby Don't Forget My Number"	1988	9	17	—	3	7	9	3	11	16	1	AUS: Gold; US: Gold	All or Nothing / Girl You Know It's True
"Blame It on the Rain"	1989	3	5	8	3	2	3	8	22	47	1	AUS: Gold; CAN: Gold; NZ: Gold; SWE: Gold; US: Platinum	All or Nothing / Girl You Know It's True
"Girl I'm Gonna Miss You"	1989	2	3	1	1	1	8	7	1	2	1	GER: Platinum; AUS: Platinum; AUT: Platinum; CAN: Gold; SWE: Gold; UK: Silver; US: Gold	All or Nothing / Girl You Know It's True
"All or Nothing"	1990	17	44	14	9	9	1	—	22	74	4		All or Nothing / Girl You Know It's True
"Keep on Running"	1990	4	62	2	—	7	—	—	8	76	—	GER: Gold; AUT: Gold	The Moment of Truth
"Too Late (True Love)"^{[A]}	1991	65	181	26	—	54	—	—	—	—	—		The Moment of Truth
"Nice 'n' Easy"^{[A]}	1991	—	—	—	—	—	—	—	—	—	—		The Moment of Truth
"We Can Get It On"^{[B]}	1993	—	—	—	—	—	—	—	—	—	—		Rob & Fab
"—" denotes album that did not chart or was not released.

Notes:

- A credited as "The Real Milli Vanilli"
- B credited as "Rob & Fab"

== Videography ==
Title	Details	Certifications
In Motion	Released: 1989; Band name: Milli Vanilli; Formats: VHS and Laserdisc; Label: 6 West	US: Multi-Platinum; CAN: Gold
Milli Vanilli	Released: 2023; Documentary	
Girl You Know It's True	Released: 2023; Biographical	
