= Milli Vanilli (film) =

2023 American documentary film by Luke Korem

- Film poster
- Directed by: Luke Korem
- Produced by: Bradley Jackson; Luke Korem
- Starring: Rob Pilatus; Fab Morvan
- Cinematography: Gabriel Patay
- Edited by: Patrick Berry
- Music by: Mondo Boys
- Production companies: MRC; Keep on Running Pictures; MTV Entertainment Studios
- Distributed by: Paramount+
- Release dates: June 10, 2023 (Tribeca Festival); October 24, 2023 (Paramount+)
- Running time: 106 minutes
- Country: United States
- Languages: English; German

Milli Vanilli is a 2023 American documentary film about the German-French pop music duo Milli Vanilli, consisting of Rob Pilatus and Fab Morvan. The film chronicles the circumstances surrounding the duo's meteoric rise to fame and devastating fall. It features rare archival footage, exclusive interviews with Pilatus and Morvan, and interviews with the real singers and record executives. It is directed by Luke Korem and produced by Korem, Bradley Jackson, MRC, Keep on Running Pictures, and Fulwell 73, in association with MTV Entertainment Studios.

== Plot ==
The film follows the rise to fame of Robert "Rob" Pilatus and Fabrice "Fab" Morvan as the duo Milli Vanilli, in the late 1980s. It features interviews with Morvan, Pilatus (through archival recordings), the real singers, record executives, and music celebrities such as Timbaland and Diane Warren.

Pilatus and Morvan, who both had difficult childhoods, first meet in Munich, Germany. With very few Black people in the area, they quickly develop a brotherly bond. The two young men work as dancers, start their own pop duo, and grow long braids as a signature hairstyle.

Record producer Frank Farian offers them a recording contract. According to Morvan, only after signing (and not reading) the contracts does the duo learn they are going to lip sync to pre-recorded tracks by other singers. They are upset by this but can't break their deal with Farian without paying back all the money he has advanced them. However, Ingrid Segieth (Farian's business partner and then-girlfriend) claims that Morvan and Pilatus did not need to be coerced into lip syncing, and they were happy to go along with the plan from the beginning.

The name Milli Vanilli is inspired by Segieth's nickname, "Milli". The group releases the album All or Nothing in Europe. After being signed to Arista Records in the United States, the album is reworked and reissued as Girl You Know It's True to American audiences. It goes 6× Platinum in 1989 and sells over 8 million copies worldwide.

Due to Pilatus and Morvan's strong accents and limited English in interviews, rumors arise that Milli Vanilli may be a fake band. They suffer an embarrassing incident when a vocal track skips at a concert. Arista tries to keep the event out of the public eye and dismisses any negative claims regarding the band's integrity.

Milli Vanilli wins Best New Artist at the 32nd Annual Grammy Awards in 1990. Morvan and Pilatus want to sing on the next album, but Farian refuses. As a result, they demand more money in the hope that a frustrated Farian will let them out of their contracts. Instead, he goes to the press and reveals the charade.

When this causes a scandal, Milli Vanilli must return their Grammy and are ostracized from the music industry. Pilatus and Morvan suffer the majority of the vitriol, while the producers and executives remain relatively unscathed. Record executive Clive Davis denies Arista had any knowledge of the lip syncing. However, the documentary's interviews reveal that Arista was aware of the situation six months before the awards ceremony, if not earlier.

In the aftermath, Farian releases the album The Moment of Truth by "the Real Milli Vanilli." This new lineup features some of the original studio singers and musicians, as well as new band members who have been hired only for sex appeal. Meanwhile, Pilatus and Morvan release the album Rob & Fab, which features their own vocals. It only sells 2,000 copies, and the duo stop working together.

Over the next several years, Pilatus struggles with poor mental health and substance abuse. He eventually dies of an overdose after mixing alcohol and pills. Segieth, who came to do a wellness check, finds him on the floor of his hotel room.

Morvan fares better, though he struggles to find respect as a musician. He moves to the Netherlands, marries, and has children. He says he no longer feels ashamed about his time in Milli Vanilli.

== Featured cast ==
Interviewees

- Fab Morvan, surviving member of Milli Vanilli
- Ingrid "Milli" Segieth, Frank Farian's former assistant and the inspiration for the name Milli Vanilli
- Brad Howell, vocalist and keyboardist of the Milli Vanilli studio band
- Charles Shaw, original rap vocalist of the Milli Vanilli studio band
- Linda Rocco, backing vocalist of the Milli Vanilli studio band
- Jodie Rocco, backing vocalist of the Milli Vanilli studio band
- Keith Yoni, bassist of the Milli Vanilli touring band
- Carmen Pilatus, Rob Pilatus' adoptive sister
- Hanif Abdurraqib, cultural critic
- Downtown Julie Brown, MTV VJ
- Mitchell Cohen, Arista Records A&R
- Toby Gad, songwriter and producer
- Tom Gordon, recording engineer of Rob & Fab's post-Milli Vanilli album
- Todd Headlee, Milli Vanilli's American assistant manager
- Stephen Hill, BET president
- Gil Kaufman, Billboard senior writer
- Ken Levy, Arista Records senior vice-president
- Rob Sheffield, Rolling Stone journalist
- Thomas Stein, Ariola executive
- Richard Sweret, Arista Records A&R
- Timbaland, music producer
- Tessa Vandersteen, Morvan's wife
- Diane Warren, songwriter behind Milli Vanilli's hit single "Blame It on the Rain"

Archive footage

- Rob Pilatus, the other half of Milli Vanilli, who died in 1998
- Frank Farian, producer and creator of Milli Vanilli
- John Davis, rap vocalist who replaced Charles Shaw in the Milli Vanilli studio band
- Clive Davis, president of Arista Records
- Michael Greene, head of the National Academy of Recording Arts and Sciences
- Bobby Farrell, the lead performer of Boney M.

== Release ==
Milli Vanilli had its world premiere at the Tribeca Festival on June 10, 2023, and was released globally by Paramount+ on October 24, 2023.

== Reception ==
Critical response

On the review aggregator website Rotten Tomatoes, 100% of 24 critics' reviews are positive, with an average rating of 7.8/10. The website's consensus reads: "With clarity and compassion, Milli Vanilli reframes one of pop's most infamous scandals as a sobering cautionary tale."

The documentary was selected as a critic's pick by both The New York Times and Variety. Both The Telegraph and The Times gave the film four out of five stars.

The film received three out of four stars from Christy Lemire of RogerEbert.com. She wrote, "The retelling of events that would become Milli Vanilli's ultimate undoing...emerges as a thrilling and stomach-turning adventure."

Owen Gleiberman of Variety called the film a "captivating and moving documentary", writing, "...where Milli Vanilli becomes a poignant experience is in making us realize that Fab Morvan and Rob Pilatus, while complicit, were not ultimately to blame. The pop music system was to blame".

Chris Azzopardi of The New York Times praised the film for interviewing "...the business side of Milli Vanilli, including officials at Arista Records", and stated that Fab Morvan "raises still-relevant questions about the way the music industry exploits vulnerable performers". Daniel Feinberg of The Hollywood Reporter gave the film a mixed review, writing, "Korem presents Milli Vanilli as puppets, but the most powerful of the people who might have pulled the strings aren't here", and "Maybe Korem's primary objective is simply to make you think more about Milli Vanilli than you ever have before. In that, it's a total success".

Accolades

Milli Vanilli was named Best Austin Film 2023 by the Austin Film Critics Association.

Variety named Milli Vanilli one of the best documentaries of 2023.

The International Documentary Association nominated the film for Best Music Documentary of 2023.

Milli Vanilli won Best Music Documentary at the 2024 Grierson Awards.
