= The U.S.-Remix Album: All or Nothing =

Remix album by Milli Vanilli
- Released: 26 June 1989
- Recorded: 1988
- Studios: Far Studios, Rosbach
- Genres: Dance; pop
- Length: 43:42
- Labels: Hansa; BMG
- Producer: Frank Farian

Milli Vanilli chronology
Girl You Know It's True (1989)	The U.S.-Remix Album: All or Nothing (1989)	The Remix Album (1990)

The U.S.-Remix Album: All or Nothing is a remix album by Milli Vanilli released in June 1989 outside of North America. It contains remixes of tracks from All or Nothing as well as tracks from the group's North American debut album Girl You Know It's True that did not appear on All or Nothing. In the United Kingdom, rather than being given a stand-alone release, the album was packaged together with All or Nothing under the title 2×2. 2×2 was also released in France, where the remix album was available on its own. After 1990, when it came to light the members of Milli Vanilli were lip-synching, a disclaimer sticker was added on the cover to explicitly name the singers who provided vocals on the album.

The U.S.-Remix Album/2×2 had more chart success than All or Nothing in most territories. It reached #1 in the Netherlands, Australia and New Zealand and the top ten in the UK, Germany and several other countries.

A conceptually similar album, The Remix Album, was released one year later in the U.S. in 1990. The Remix Album includes extended, remixed versions of the group's singles and tracks which were exclusive to the European studio album All or Nothing.

== Track listing ==
No.	Title	Writer(s)	Length
1.	"Blame It on the Rain" (Super Club Mix)	Diane Warren	6:44
2.	"More Than You'll Ever Know"	Ernesto Phillips	3:52
3.	"Take It as It Comes"	Climie Fisher; Dennis Morgan	4:12
4.	"It's Your Thing"	O'Kelly Isley; Ronald Isley; Rudolph Isley	4:06
5.	"Dreams to Remember" (Remix)	Frank Farian; Mary Applegate; Dietmar Kawohl	3:48
6.	"All or Nothing" (US Club Mix)	Farian; B. Nail; P. G. Wilder	4:31
7.	"Baby Don't Forget My Number" (N.Y. Subway Mix)	Farian; Nail	4:53
8.	"I'm Gonna Miss You" (Long Version Remix)	Farian; Kawohl; Peter Bischoff Fallenstein	5:07
9.	"Girl You Know It's True" (N.Y. Subway Mix)	Ky Adeyemo; Rodney Holloman; Kevin Liles; Bill Pettaway Jr.; Sean Spencer	6:28
Total length:			43:42

* Some editions list erroneous track lengths (for instance, the German CD release). Listed here are the lengths generally accepted as standard for all releases regardless of what is printed.

== Personnel ==
- Charles Shaw – vocals, backing vocals
- John Davis – vocals, backing vocals
- Brad Howell – vocals
- Frank Farian – producer
- Tobias Freund, Bernd Berwanger, Norbert Janicke, Jens Seekamp – mixing
- P.G. Wilder, Pit Loew, Toby Gad, Jens Gad – arrangements

== Charts ==
=== Weekly charts ===
Chart (1989–1990)	Peak position
Australian Albums (ARIA)	1
Austrian Albums (Ö3 Austria)	3
Dutch Albums (Album Top 100)	1
French Albums (SNEP)	18
German Albums (Offizielle Top 100)	4
New Zealand Albums (RMNZ)	1
Norwegian Albums (VG-lista)	10
Swedish Albums (Sverigetopplistan)	4
Swiss Albums (Schweizer Hitparade)	3
UK Albums (Official Charts) as 2×2	6

== Sales and certifications ==
Certifications for The U.S.-Remix Album: All or Nothing
Region	Certification	Certified units/sales
Australia (ARIA)	2× Platinum	140,000^{^}
Austria (IFPI Austria)	Platinum	50,000^{*}
France (SNEP)	Gold	100,000^{*}
Netherlands (NVPI)	Platinum	100,000^{^}
New Zealand (RMNZ)	Platinum	15,000^{^}
Spain (Promusicae)	2× Platinum	200,000^{^}
Sweden (GLF)	Gold	50,000^{^}
Switzerland (IFPI Switzerland)	Platinum	50,000^{^}
^{*} Sales figures based on certification alone.^{^} Shipments figures based on certification alone.
