= The Remix Album (Milli Vanilli album) =

Remix album by Milli Vanilli
- Released: May 15, 1990
- Recorded: 1988
- Studios: Far Studios, Rosbach
- Genres: Dance; pop
- Length: 46:08
- Label: Arista
- Producer: Frank Farian

Milli Vanilli chronology
2 X 2 (1989)	The Remix Album (1990)	The Moment Of Truth (1991)

Professional ratings
Review scores
Source	Rating
AllMusic	2/5 stars
Entertainment Weekly	C−
The Rolling Stone Album Guide	1/5 stars

The Remix Album is a remix album released in North America by Milli Vanilli in 1990. Due to the significant differences between the original Milli Vanilli debut album, All or Nothing, and the North America-only Girl You Know It's True release, producer Frank Farian decided to repackage these previously unreleased songs in a remix album. A conceptually similar album, The U.S.-Remix Album: All or Nothing had been released one year earlier in 1989 outside of North America which contained remixes of tracks from All or Nothing as well as tracks from the group's North American debut album Girl You Know It's True that did not appear on All or Nothing. The album peaked at number thirty-two in the US and was certified Gold by the RIAA in July 1990.

The songs that had been unreleased in the US are "Money", "Hush", "Can't You Feel My Love" and "Boy in the Tree". Most of the songs on this album are completely remixed from the original version included on the group's European debut album.

== Track listing ==
The Remix Album track listing
No.	Title	Length
1.	"Girl You Know It's True"	5:30
2.	"Baby Don't Forget My Number"	5:32
3.	"Blame It on the Rain"	5:49
4.	"All or Nothing"	5:38
5.	"Money"	5:33
6.	"Hush"	4:17
7.	"Can't You Feel My Love"	4:16
8.	"Boy in the Tree"	4:06
9.	"Girl I'm Gonna Miss You"	5:15
Total length:		46:08

== Personnel ==
- Charles Shaw – vocals, backing vocals
- John Davis – vocals, backing vocals
- Brad Howell – vocals
- Jodie Rocco – vocals
- Linda Rocco – vocals
- Frank Farian – producer

== Charts ==
Chart performance for The Remix Album
Chart (1990)	Peak position
Australian Albums (ARIA)	68
Canada Top Albums/CDs (RPM)	43
US Billboard 200	32
