= Girl You Know It's True (film) =

2023 biographical film

Girl You Know It’s True
- Theatrical release poster
- Directed by: Simon Verhoeven
- Screenplay by: Simon Verhoeven
- Produced by: Simon Verhoeven; Quirin Berg; Max Wiedemann; Kirstin Winkler
- Starring: Elan Ben Ali; Tijan Njie; Matthias Schweighöfer; Bella Dayne; Graham Rogers
- Cinematography: Jo Heim
- Edited by: Elena Schmidt; Felix Schmerbeck; Alexander Berner
- Music by: Segun Akinola
- Production companies: Leonine Productions; Wiedemann & Berg Film; Sentana Film; SevenPictures; Mediawan; Voltage Pictures
- Distributed by: Leonine Studios (Germany); Vertical (North America)
- Release dates: 21 December 2023 (Germany); 9 August 2024 (United States)
- Running time: 124 minutes
- Countries: Germany; South Africa; United States; France
- Languages: English; German; French
- Box office: $3.7 million

Girl You Know It's True is a 2023 biographical film about the late-1980s/early-1990s music duo Milli Vanilli, who caused one of the most infamous scandals in international pop music. Simon Verhoeven wrote, directed and co-produced the biopic, which was produced by Wiedemann & Berg Film, with Leonine as the theatrical distributor, released in cinemas on 21 December 2023. The movie stars Tijan Njie and Elan Ben Ali as the lip-synching stage artists Rob Pilatus and Fab Morvan, as well as Matthias Schweighöfer as the music producer Frank Farian.

== Plot ==
Robert "Rob" Pilatus–a mixed-race child adopted by a German couple in an all-white Munich neighbourhood–finds solace listening to Boney M., the pop group created by established music producer Frank Farian. Years later, following an argument with his adoptive father who disapproves of his son's career path, Rob leaves home and meets Fabrice "Fab" Morvan, an aspiring choreographer from France. In 1988, after revamping their image, they perform as podium dancers at a nightclub where music journalist Ingrid "Milli" Segeith scouts them. She introduces the pair to her partner Frank, who reveals that his future hit "Girl You Know It's True" is already recorded, and the duo are only required to mime, to which they unwittingly agree. Rob and Fab are concerned that the recording is a cover version but Frank and Milli assure them that re-recording original songs is common industry practice, and "Girl You Know It's True" climbs the charts across Europe.

In 1989, Rob and Fab–now known as Milli Vanilli–are signed to Arista Records in America where they are warmly welcomed, although executives arrange for a dialect coach to help refine their strong European accents. The duo accumulate a vast fan base after relocating to Los Angeles, but their lavish lifestyle, drug addiction, and reckless behaviour earn them a bad reputation. Meanwhile, Numarx, the original band behind "Girl You Know It's True", are furious to discover their record company sold their song without permission, but are unable to sue as they own no publishing rights. Rob is overjoyed when a man claiming to be his biological father contacts him, but cuts ties upon realising he is an imposter after monetary gain.

Back in Germany, Frank grows increasingly worried that his secret will be exposed and orders Milli Vanilli to return home, which they refuse. Apart from a technical glitch incident that causes their backing record to skip during a show, their Club MTV tour appearances are a success, with "Baby Don't Forget My Number", "Blame It On The Rain", and "Girl I'm Gonna Miss You" hitting No. 1 in America. The original session singers, Brad Howell and John Davis, are upset that Rob and Fab are receiving the recognition and accolades they believe are rightfully theirs, especially after Milli Vanilli are nominated for the 1990 Best New Artist Grammy, which they unexpectedly win. The duo insist on singing live during their performance at the ceremony, but their request is denied.

Realising he is now powerless against Milli Vanilli, Frank threatens legal action against the duo and Arista to prevent them from using their stage name for an upcoming tour after Rob and Fab threaten to reveal the truth, unless they use their own voices on the next album. Taking decisive action on his own terms, Frank holds a press conference in New York, where he publicly admits that Milli Vanilli had never sang on their album, igniting a major scandal. Overnight, the fans turn against Milli Vanilli, Arista deletes their music catalogue, and the duo's Grammy is revoked. While Numarx reacquire their publishing rights–now worth millions–and subsequently become successful music executives, Rob spirals deeper into addiction and Fab, unable to cope with his friend's situation, moves out of their shared apartment.

In 1998, following his release from jail, Rob returns to Germany where Frank offers to send him to rehab in Sri Lanka, but he dies of an overdose, leaving Fab devastated. At the funeral, Rob's sister Carmen is irritated to see Frank among the attendees, but Fab is unable to attend. However, at a Los Angeles beachside bar, Fab pays his respects by playing an acoustic rendition of "Blame It on the Rain", this time using his own voice. During the film's epilogue, it is revealed that Fab released a solo album in 2003 and currently lives in the Netherlands with his family; Frank relocated to Miami and continued to produce music until his death in January 2024; Milli married another musician, Frank's best friend; John Davis went on to form "Face Meets Voice – A Milli Vanilli Experience" with Fab until his death in 2021.

Fab–who is narrating the film with Rob–apologises to his friend for leaving him at the height of his drug problems, claiming he had to save himself first, and Rob assures him it was not his fault. The film ends with Milli Vanilli performing "Girl You Know It's True"–alongside Brad, John, backing singers the Rocco Twins, and young Rob–giving their audience the happy ending they expect.

== Cast ==
- Tijan Njie as Rob Pilatus, dancer and one half of Milli Vanilli
  - Romeo Guy Da Silva as Young Rob
- Elan Ben Ali as Fab Morvan, choreographer and other half of Milli Vanilli
- Matthias Schweighöfer as Frank Farian, music producer
  - David Verhoeven as young Frank
- Bella Dayne as Ingrid "Milli" Segeith, music journalist and Frank Farian's girlfriend
- Graham Rogers as Todd Headlee, Milli Vanilli's assistant manager
- Stevonte Hart as Kevin Liles, DJ crew Numarx's leader
- Ashley Dowds as Benny Dorn, Milli Vanilli's American manager, based on Sandy Gallin
- Michael Maertens as Markus Klein, Hansa Records executive
- Tijan Marei as Carmen Pilatus, Rob's adoptive sister
- Thomas Bading as Hans Pilatus, Rob's adoptive father
- Ulrike Arnold as Antonie Pilatus, Rob's adoptive mother
- David Mayonga as Brad Howell, session singer behind Milli Vanilli
- Samuel S. Franklin as John Davis, session singer behind Milli Vanilli
- Darlene Tejeiro as Denise Milan, Arista Records executive
- David Chevers as Tom Sacks
- Natasha Loring as Lisa
- Andrew Roux as Ricardo, music coach based on Seth Riggs
- James Flynn as Gary, manager of Club MTV tour
- Cornell Adams as Andrew Harrison
- Bonita Lubliner as Jody Rocco, Milli Vanilli backing vocalist
- Ramona Gianvecchio as Linda Rocco, Milli Vanilli backing vocalist
- Mitsou Jung as Melly
- Penelope Frego as Stefania, singer based on Sabrina Salerno
- Roxanne Rittmann as Emily
- Ivy Quainoo as Downtown Julie Brown, MTV VJ and Club MTV tour host

== Production ==
=== Development ===
Previous attempts to produce the film had failed. In 2007, it was announced that Universal Pictures was developing a motion picture based on Milli Vanilli's rise and fall. Jeff Nathanson, a screenwriter known for Catch Me If You Can, was to write and direct the film, with Morvan serving as a consultant, providing his and Pilatus's point of view. However, the project was never completed. In 2011, German director Florian Gallenberger announced that he was reviving the project and rewriting the script, but the project never materialised.

In August 2022, it was revealed that Leonine Studios were filming a biopic about the troubled musical duo Milli Vanilli. The project's writer and director, Simon Verhoeven, was named producer alongside Quirin Berg and Max Wiedemann, as well as Laura Mihajlovic of Wiedemann & Berg Film.

One of the executive producers of the biopic is R&B music producer and performer Kevin Liles, who composed the original version of "Girl You Know It's True" with Baltimore DJ crew Numarx in 1986. Kirstin Winkler and Frank Farian are also among several other producers. Associate producers are Jasmin Davis, daughter of John Davis, and Brad Howell. Carmen Pilatus, sister of Rob Pilatus, Milli Vanilli's former assistant Todd Headlee, and Ingrid Segieth a.k.a. Milli, are also attached as associate producers.

Since Morvan had previously sold his film rights to director and producer Brett Ratner, he initially couldn't be involved in Verhoeven's film. After Ratner was called out and sidelined during the #MeToo movement in Hollywood, which led to the cancellation of Ratner's competing Milli Vanilli biopic, Morvan eventually could join the team behind the camera as another co-producer.

Additional production was done by Sentana Film, SevenPictures and Mediawan. The film was picked up by Voltage Pictures.

=== Casting ===
Matthias Schweighöfer was confirmed as playing the group's producer Frank Farian, with Elan Ben Ali and Tijan Njie appearing as the Milli Vanilli frontmen Fabrice Morvan and Rob Pilatus. In September 2022, roles were announced for Graham Rogers and Bella Dayne.

=== Filming ===
Filming took place in Munich, Berlin, Cape Town, and Los Angeles in 2022, with filming continuing until the end of the year. Filming was confirmed to have wrapped in December 2022, and in February 2023 Voltage Pictures were announced to have acquired worldwide sales (excluding Germany) and were taking the film to the European Film Market.

== Release ==
The film was released in Germany on 21 December 2023, and in the United States on 9 August 2024. Its North American premiere took place at the 2024 Berlin & Beyond Film Festival in San Francisco with Morvan in attendance. In June 2024, Vertical acquired North American distribution rights to the film, planning a day-and-date release on 9 August 2024.

== Reception ==
On the review aggregator website Rotten Tomatoes, 85% of 34 critics' reviews are positive, with an average rating of 6.4/10. The website's consensus reads: "Girl You Know It's True is an inventive music biopic buoyed by charismatic leads, solid performances, and a clever mix of humor and sensitivity that offers a riveting look at the rise and fall of Milli Vanilli."

=== Awards ===
At the Bavarian Film Awards on 19 January 2024, Girl You Know It's True won for Best Film, as well as Best Newcomers for the main actor duo Tijan Njie and Elan Ben Ali.
