= Fab Morvan =

French singer, dancer, and model (born 1966)

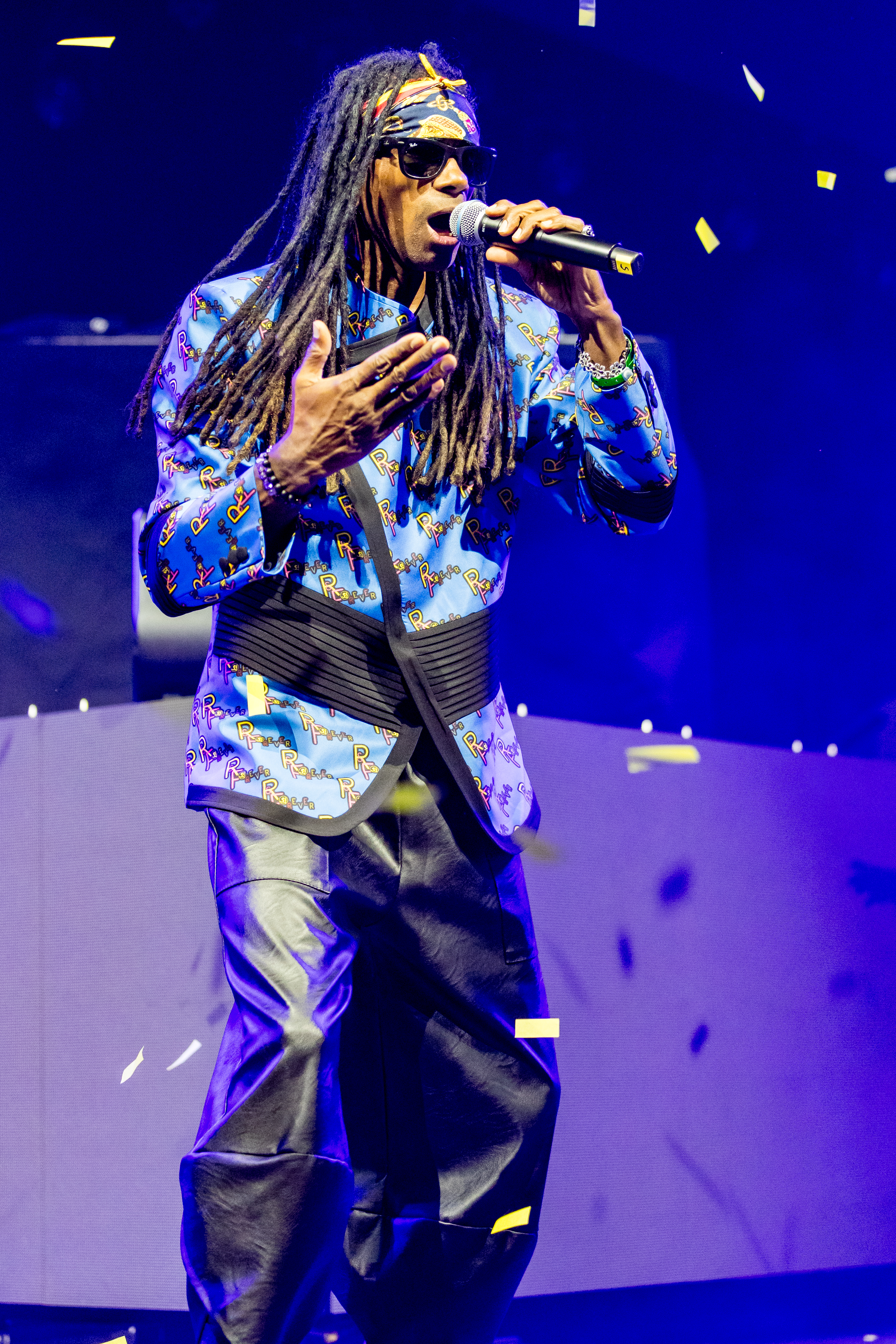
- Morvan performing in 2024

Background information
- Born: Fabrice Maxime Sylvain Morvan; 14 May 1966 (age 60); Paris, France
- Genres: Dance-pop; hip hop; new jack swing
- Occupations: Singer; songwriter; rapper; dancer; model
- Years active: 1988–present
- Labels: Arista; BMG; Elixir Records; Hansa; Joss Entertainment Group
- Formerly of: Milli Vanilli; Rob & Fab
- Website: fabmorvanofficial.com

Fabrice Maxime Sylvain Morvan (born 14 May 1966) is a French singer, dancer, rapper, and model who was half of the pop duo Milli Vanilli, along with Rob Pilatus. It was later revealed that the two had not actually sung on any of their recordings. After the scandal, the group reformed as Rob & Fab in the 1990s, with limited success. Morvan had a solo comeback in the 2000s, releasing the album Love Revolution in 2003.

== Biography ==
=== Early years ===
Morvan was born in 1966 in Paris, France, to parents from Pointe-à-Pitre, Guadeloupe. At 18, he moved to Germany, where he worked as a dancer and model and was influenced by funk, soul, hip hop, and pop music. He met Rob Pilatus in a nightclub in Munich, and they decided to form a rock/soul group.

=== Milli Vanilli ===
Morvan and Pilatus were noticed by music producer Frank Farian, who signed them as part of a musical act called Milli Vanilli. The duo served as the public faces for singers Charles Shaw, John Davis, and Brad Howell, who Farian thought were talented musicians but lacked a marketable image.

The first Milli Vanilli album, titled Girl You Know It's True, was released in 1989 and proved popular worldwide. It had four hit singles: the title track, "Girl I'm Gonna Miss You", "Baby Don't Forget My Number", and "Blame It on the Rain". The group won a Grammy Award for Best New Artist on 22 February 1990 for Girl You Know It's True.

Morvan and Pilatus were frequent targets of rumors and allegations of onstage lip-synching and not having sung on the album. The same year the group released their debut album, Shaw told a reporter the truth but recanted after Farian paid him $155,000 to do so.

When Morvan and Pilatus pressured Farian to let them sing on the next album, Farian then revealed the truth about their lip-synching to reporters on 15 November 1990. As a result, Milli Vanilli's Grammy was withdrawn four days later, while Arista Records dropped the act from its roster and deleted their album and its masters from their catalogue, thus making Girl You Know It's True the largest-selling album to ever be deleted. A court ruling allowed any American who bought the album to get a partial refund.

Farian later attempted a failed comeback for the group without Morvan and Pilatus, releasing the album The Moment of Truth in February 1991, with new cover art featuring the actual session musicians.

=== Aftermath ===
Months later, Morvan and Pilatus parodied the scandal in a commercial for Carefree sugarless gum. In it, the duo lip syncs to an opera recording. An announcer asks, "How long does the taste of Carefree sugarless gum last?" The record then begins to skip, and the announcer answers, "until these guys sing themselves".

Morvan and Pilatus moved to Los Angeles, where they released an eponymous album under the name Rob & Fab in 1993. Only around 2,000 copies were sold. On 26 March 2007, the Milli Vanilli compilation Best of the Best was released.

=== Solo comeback ===
In 2003, Morvan released his first solo album, Love Revolution, producing, recording, writing, and singing on all the tracks. On 14 April 2011, he issued the single "Anytime" to digital outlets. On 25 May 2012, he released the single "See the Light" with a new band, Fabulous Addiction.

In 2016, Morvan appeared in a documentary-style KFC commercial that focused on his life and music career after Milli Vanilli.

On 1 November 2022, he appeared in an ad/trailer for the Ryan Reynolds and Will Ferrell-led Christmas comedy Spirited. In it, Reynolds and Ferrell are trying to dispel rumors that they lip synched in the film. The audience, however, notices that the actors' voices don't sound quite right. The camera then cuts to a shot of Morvan in a recording studio booth, providing voiceovers.

In 2025, Morvan cowrote the memoir You Know It's True: The Real Story of Milli Vanilli with Parisa Rose. He was subsequently nominated for the upcoming 68th Annual Grammy Awards, in the category "Best Audio Book, Narration & Storytelling Recording".

=== Film projects ===
On 14 February 2007, it was announced that Universal Pictures was developing a film based on the true story of Milli Vanilli's rise and fall in the music industry. Jeff Nathanson, a screenwriter known for Catch Me If You Can, was to write and direct. Morvan was supposed to serve as a consultant, providing his and Pilatus's points of view. However, the project was never completed. In 2011 German director Florian Gallenberger declared that he was reviving it and would be rewriting the script. This ultimately didn't happen.

Director Brett Ratner attempted to make his version of a Milli Vanilli biopic, for which Morvan sold his exclusive life rights to Ratner's production company, RatPac Entertainment, but the project was cancelled in 2021, after numerous Time's Up sexual harassment allegations against Ratner became public.

Between 2021 and 2022, Simon Verhoeven directed and wrote the Milli Vanilli biopic Girl You Know It's True, which was filmed in Munich, Berlin, Cape Town, and Los Angeles. It was produced by Wiedemann & Berg Film, with Leonine as the theatrical distributor. The movie stars Tijan Njie and Elan Ben Ali as Pilatus and Morvan, as well as Matthias Schweighöfer as Farian. One of the executive producers is R&B music producer and performer Kevin Liles, who composed the original version of "Girl You Know It's True" in 1986. Associate producers are Jasmin Davis, daughter of John Davis, and Brad Howell. Carmen Pilatus, sister of Rob Pilatus, Milli Vanilli's former assistant Todd Headlee, and Ingrid Segieth a.k.a. Milli, are also attached as associate producers. After Ratner's project was officially cancelled, Morvan could also join the co-producers' ranks of Girl You Know It's True. He attended the world premiere in Munich on 4 December 2023 and even performed the title song at the Bavarian Film Awards on 19 January 2024 together with Tijan Njie and Elan Ben Ali. The feature won Best Film.

Milli Vanilli documentary

On 13 March 2021, Variety announced that a feature documentary was in the works, directed by Luke Korem and produced by Korem, Bradley Jackson, Keep on Running Pictures, and MRC.

On 1 June 2023, it was announced that Paramount+ had acquired the film, titled Milli Vanilli. The feature premiered at the Tribeca Festival on 10 June 2023. It received positive critical reviews, including Variety calling it a "captivating and moving documentary" and saying that it "brings off something at once strategic, artful, and humane". The Hollywood Reporter released a trailer on 13 September 2023, and announced the film would have a global release on 24 October.

== Personal life ==
Morvan married his manager, Kim Marlowe, in 1998. In January 2024, Marlowe filed for divorce at the Los Angeles Superior Court. Morvan has four children with his partner Tessa van der Steen, with whom he resides in Amsterdam.

== Discography ==
=== Solo ===
- Love Revolution (2003)

=== with Milli Vanilli ===
- All or Nothing (1988)
- Girl You Know It's True (1989)
- Best of the Best (2007)

=== with Rob & Fab ===
- Rob & Fab (1993)

=== with Fabulous Addiction ===
- "See the Light" (2012)

=== with NightAir ===
- "One of These Nights" (2014)

=== Grammy Awards ===
The Grammys are annual awards presented by the National Academy of Recording Arts & Sciences.

Year	Category	Nominated work	Result
2026	Best Audio Book, Narration & Storytelling Recording	You Know It's True: The Real Story of Milli Vanilli	Nominated
