= Girl You Know It's True =

Girl You Know It's True may refer to:

- "Girl You Know It's True" (song) (1988)
- Girl You Know It's True (album) (1989)
- Girl You Know It's True (film) (2023)
