= Simon Verhoeven =

German-Austrian multifaceted filmmaker (born 1972)

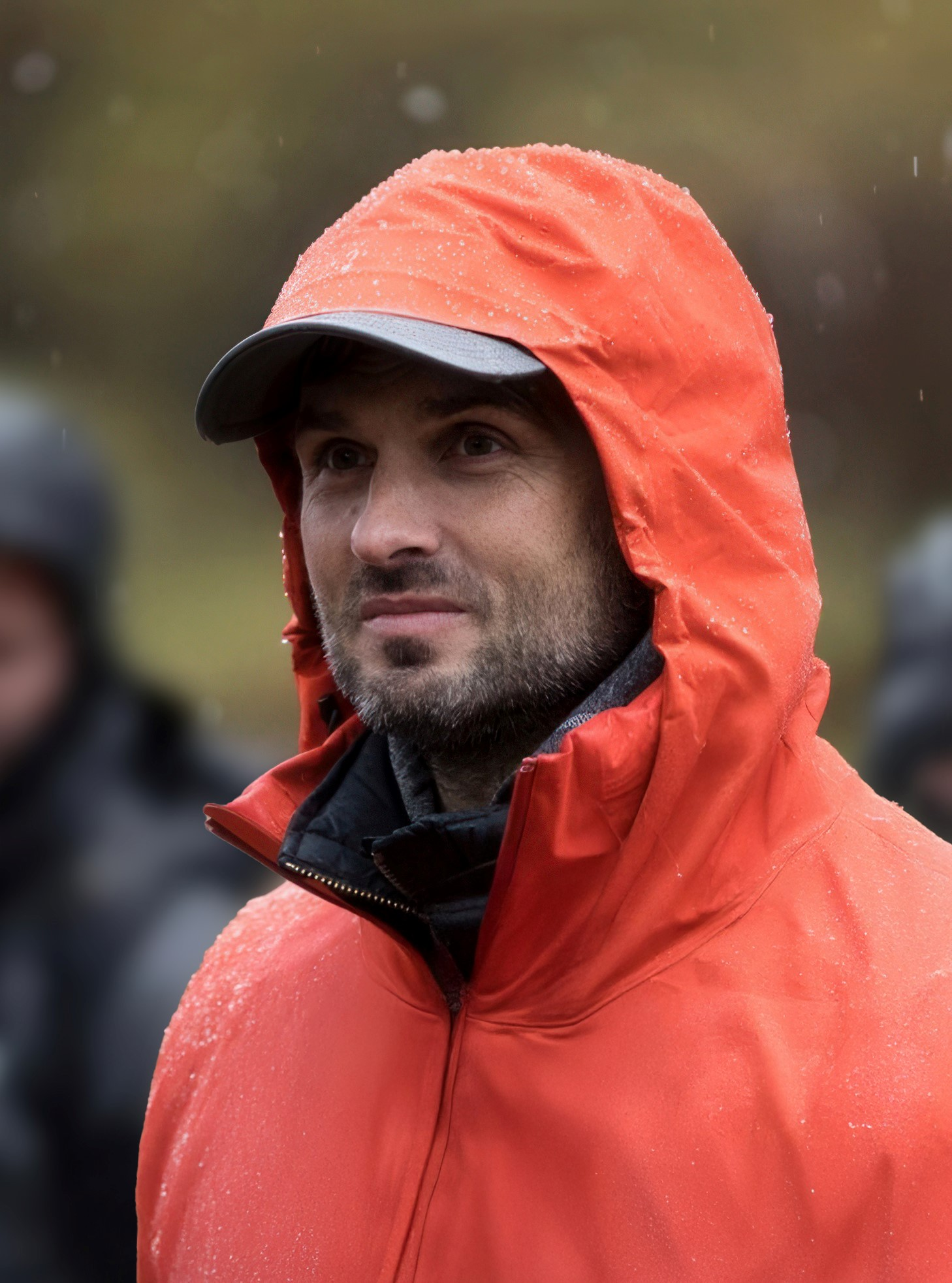
- Verhoeven in 2025 during production of Ach, diese Lücke, diese entsetzliche Lücke
- Born: 20 June 1972 (age 54); Munich, Bavaria, West Germany
- Occupations: Film director; screenwriter; film producer; actor; film composer
- Years active: 1995–present
- Parents: Michael Verhoeven (father); Senta Berger (mother)
- Relatives: Lis Verhoeven (aunt); Paul Verhoeven (grandfather)

Simon Verhoeven (born 20 June 1972) is a German-Austrian film director, screenwriter, film producer, former actor, and occasional film music composer.

== Life and family ==
Verhoeven is the son of international screen actress Senta Berger and BAFTA-winning, Oscar-nominated film director Michael Verhoeven.

The Verhoevens have been working in acting and directing for generations: Simon Verhoeven's grandfather Paul Verhoeven (not the Dutch filmmaker of the same name) ran the renowned Deutsches Theater in Berlin as well as the Munich Kammerspiele. Michael Verhoeven's sister Lis Verhoeven was a stage actress and director who was briefly married to international screen actor Mario Adorf. Simon Verhoeven's brother Luca is also an actor who debuted in Simon's first cinematic directorial effort 100 Pro (2001). The family legacy on stage and screen was captured in the documentary film The Verhoevens (2003).

Simon Verhoeven has been married to Nina since 2023. They have two sons.

Verhoeven and his father run their own production company, Sentana Filmproduktion, which Michael Verhoeven and Senta Berger founded already in 1965.

== Education ==
After finishing high school in Munich in 1991, Verhoeven moved to New York to study acting at the Lee Strasberg Theatre and Film Institute. In his New York years he also studied jazz composition under Don Friedman, and later took classes in film music scoring at the Berklee College of Music in Boston. In 1995, Verhoeven got accepted at the New York University Tisch School of the Arts to study screenwriting and film directing; he graduated as a Bachelor of Fine Arts in 1999.

== Directing and screenwriting career ==
Verhoeven belongs to the most bankable German film directors and screenwriters of the 2010s until today. His most successful film so far has been Welcome to Germany (Willkommen bei den Hartmanns), which became 2016's biggest domestic theatrical release in Germany with over 4 million tickets sold and a global box office of almost $50m. This comedy about the 2015 refugee crisis was screened at many international film festivals, and it won many German as well as international awards and nominations.

After making a few short films and music videos in the late 1990s, Verhoeven's screenwriting and directing career started in 2001 with the buddy comedy 100 Pro. He followed up with his 2009 ensemble comedy Men in the City (Männerherzen), which sold over 2 million tickets at the domestic box office. This success sparked the equally successful sequel Men in the City 2 in 2011 (also written and directed by Verhoeven), as well as a number of international remakes in the Netherlands, Belgium, and other countries.

With his first English-language feature film Friend Request (2014) starring Alycia Debnam Carrey, Verhoeven tried his hand in the horror genre. The film made a respectable $2m opening weekend gross at the US box office. Additionally the German production sold well at the international film markets and was screened in theaters worldwide.

Returning to his homeland, Verhoeven landed a huge hit with his aforementioned political comedy Welcome to Germany (2016) that convinced audiences as well as critics world-wide. The film marks also a special collaboration, since Verhoeven directed his mother for the first time, the international screen and TV actress Senta Berger. His film got adapted for the stage, premiering at the Akademietheater of the world-famous Viennese Burgtheater. Many travelling productions followed that tour the German-language stages until today.

In February 2020, Warner Bros. released his sixth theatrical feature Nightlife starring Elias M'Barek and Frederik Lau, which started as number 1 of the German box office. The comedy had sold over 1 million tickets within 10 days of release, when the COVID-19 crisis forced all cinemas to close down, stopping its success in the tracks. It then topped the drive-in charts when regular cinematic screenings weren't possible. Still, the comedy remained the most successful domestic film at the German box office 2020. On May 23, 2020 the comedy received the Austrian Romy Award for the Best Screenplay. At the Monte-Carlo Comedy Film Festival Nightlife received numerous accolades: The prizes for Best Film, Best Director, the Audience Award as well as a Special Mention for the cast. Due to the ongoing COVID-19 travel situation, Verhoeven didn't attend the ceremony on 10 October 2020. The renowned Berlin film critic society awarded Nightlife with the Ernst-Lubitsch-Preis for the best comedy 2020. Mario Adorf presented him the award in person 8 months later on 28 September 2021. Three days later, he also received another Lola German Film Award for the most successful theatrically released film in 2020 for Nightlife. The same night, the Deutsche Filmakademie also honoured his mother Senta Berger with a Lifetime Achievement Award for her works in German cinema.

On all his directorial works, Verhoeven collaborated with the director of photography Jo Heim.

Next to his feature works, Verhoeven also directs commercials, among them advertisements for Apple, Lufthansa, Beats by Dre, Deutsche Telekom, and many others.

In 2020/2021, Verhoeven created and co-directed the sports documentary series FC Bayern – Behind the Legend, produced by Wiedemann und Berg. The docu focuses on FC Bayern Munich's successful soccer/football 6-title-winning season 2020/2021 under manager Hansi Flick, as well as their legend-rich past. It's exclusively screened on Amazon Prime from 2 November 2021.

In 2021/2022, Verhoeven directed and wrote the Milli-Vanilli-Biopic Girl You Know It's True, which was filmed in Munich, Berlin, Cape Town, and Los Angeles. The film was again produced by Wiedemann & Berg Film, with Leonine as the theatrical distributor. The movie, stars Matthias Schweighöfer as music producer Frank Farian, and Tijan Njie and Elan Ben Ali as the infamous dancers / faux-singers Rob Pilatus and Fab Morvan. It will be released in cinemas 2023. Associate producers are Jasmin Davis, daughter of the late John Davis, and Brad Howell, the true voices behind Milli Vanilli. Carmen Pilatus, sister of the late Rob Pilatus, Milli Vanilli's former assistant Todd Headlee, and Ingrid Segieth aka Milli, are also attached as associate producers.

In 2024, Verhoeven wrote, directed, and co-produced the comedy Alter weißer Mann (English: Old white man), a commentary on the social trappings of staying politically correct. It won the Civis Cinema Award of the CIVIS Medienstiftung in 2025.

In 2025, Verhoeven adapted the best-selling novel Ach, diese Lücke, diese entsetzliche Lücke by Joachim Meyerhoff, as screenwriter and director. The international film title is Oh This Unspeakable Void. The female lead role is played again by Verhoeven's mother Senta Berger. The film is produced by Komplizenfilm and is distributed by Warner Bros.The film has been nominated for 7 LOLAs at the German Film Award: Best Director and Best Screenplay (both for Verhoeven), Best Film (for producers Janine Jackowitz, Jonas Dornbach and Maren Ade), Best Female Lead Actor (Senta Berger), Best Male Lead Actor (Bruno Alexander), Best Male Supporting Actor (Michael Wittenborn), and Best Sound Design (Eckhard Kuchenbecker, Dominik Schleier, Nico Krebs, Christoph Merkele und Hanse Warns). The awards were announced in Berlin on 29 May 2026. The film won 3 awards: Best Film in Bronze, Best Female Lead Actor, and Best Male Supporting Actor.

As his writing and directing idols, Verhoeven names the comedy legends Billy Wilder and Ernst Lubitsch – who both started their careers in Germany before moving to Hollywood.

== Acting career ==
Before following in his father Michael Verhoeven's filmmaking footsteps – an infamous political auteur of the New German Cinema who caused the shutdown of the Berlinale Competition in 1970 – Simon Verhoeven started out as a screen and TV actor like his mother Senta Berger, who in her 70-year-spanning career starred alongside international screen legends Dean Martin, Frank Sinatra, John Wayne, Kirk Douglas, Jeanne Moreau, Alain Delon, Yul Brynner, Charlton Heston, Albert Finney, Robert Vaughn, Robert Wagner, and many more.

Verhoeven landed his first film role while still studying in New York, playing in the 1995 indie comedy Party Girl next to Parker Posey and Liev Schreiber. The same year he was directed by his father in My Mother's Courage. In the Russian-German co-production Vasilia (2000) he worked alongside punk icon Nina Hagen.

Back in Germany, he acted in many made-for-TV romantic comedies, but Verhoeven also took on more substantial roles particularly in films based on true events: In Bruce Beresford's Bride of the Wind (2001) he plays Bauhaus director Walter Gropius, in Sönke Wortmann's The Miracle of Bern (2006) he embodies the 1954 football World Cup winner Ottmar Walter, in The Sinking of the Laconia (2010) he is the 1940s naval officer Harro Schacht, and in the multi-award-winning thriller Mogadischu (2008), he plays the Lufthansa flight 181 pilot Jürgen Vietor in this retelling of the 1977 Palestinian hostage crisis.

Verhoeven's most recent acting parts so far were cameos in his two Men in the City comedies and Nightlife, as well as playing a version of himself in the Curb Your Enthusiasm-style comedy series Jerks.

== Awards (selected) ==
- Bavarian Film Awards - (2009) Best Screenplay for Men in the City
- Bogey Awards - (2009) for 1 million tickets sold within 10 days of release for Men in the City
- Jupiter Award - (2010) Best German Film for Men in the City
- Lola German Film Awards - (2016) Most Successful Film for Welcome to Germany
- Bavarian Film Awards - (2016) Best Film + Audience Award for Welcome to Germany
- Bogey Awards - (2016) for 1 million tickets sold within 10 days of release for Welcome to Germany
- Goldene Leinwand - (2016) for over 3 million tickets sold within 18 months of release for Welcome to Germany
- AZ Stern des Jahres - (2016) for Welcome to Germany
- Peace Prize of German Film "The Bridge" (Friedenspreis des Deutschen Films "Die Brücke") - (2017) for Welcome to Germany
- Bambi - (2017) Best German Film for Welcome to Germany
- GQ Men of the Year Awards - (2017) Special Achievement Award for Welcome to Germany
- Jupiter Award - (2017) Best German Film for Welcome to Germany
- European Film Award - (2017) Best Comedy (nominated) for Welcome to Germany
- German Comedy Awards - (2017) Best Film Comedy for Welcome to Germany
- Günther Rohrbach Preis - (2017) Best Screenplay for Welcome to Germany
- European Union Film Festival Toronto - (2018) Audience Award
- Romy - (2020) Best Screenplay for Nightlife
- Monte-Carlo Comedy Film Festival - (2020) Best Film + Best Director + Audience Award + Special Mention: Cast for Nightlife
- Ernst-Lubitsch-Preis of the Berlin film critic society - (2020) Best Comedy for Nightlife
- Lola German Film Awards - (2021) Most Successful Film for Nightlife
- Civis Cinema Award - (2025) Audience Award for Alter weißer Mann
- German Film Award - (2026) Best Film in Bronze, Best Director and Best Screenplay (nominated) for Oh This Unspeakable Void

== Filmography ==
=== Director/screenwriter ===
- 100 Pro (2001), also music composer
- Men in the City (2009)
- Men in the City 2 (2011), also music composer
- Friend Request (2016)
- Welcome to Germany (2016), also producer
- Nightlife (2020)
- FC Bayern – Behind the Legend (2021), documentary series - also creator
- Girl You Know It's True (2022), also co-producer
- Alter weißer Mann (2024), also co-producer
- Ach diese Lücke, diese entsetzliche Lücke (2026)

=== Actor (selected) ===
- Party Girl (1995), with Parker Posey
- My Mother's Courage (1995), also music composer, directed by Michael Verhoeven
- Vasilisa (2000), with Nina Hagen
- Bride of the Wind (2001), with Jonathan Pryce
- The Miracle of Bern (2003)
- Girls on Top 2 (Mädchen, Mädchen 2 – Loft oder Liebe) (2004)
- The Fisherman and His Wife (2005)
- Mogadischu (2008)
- The Sinking of the Laconia (2010)
- Jerks, TV comedy series (2021)
