= Keep On Running (disambiguation) =

Keep On Running or Keep On Runnin' may refer to:

== Music ==
- "Keep On Running" (Jackie Edwards song), 1965
- "Keep On Running" (Milli Vanilli song), 1990
- "Keep On Running", a song by Stevie Wonder from Music of My Mind
- "Keep On Running", a song by Vanden Plas
- "Keep On Runnin'", a song by the band Journey from Escape
- "Keep On Runnin' (Crawlin' Black Spider)", a song by Cat Power (interpolating a song by John Lee Hooker) from You Are Free
- Keep On Running, original title of The Real Milli Vanilli album The Moment of Truth

== Television ==
- "Keep On Running" (The Green Green Grass), a 2005 television episode
- "Keep on Running" (Holby City), a television episode

== See also ==
- Keep Running
