= All or Nothing (Milli Vanilli song) =

1990 single by Milli Vanilli

- Continental European and Australasian cover

Single by Milli Vanilli

from the album All or Nothing and Girl You Know It's True
- B-side: "Dreams to Remember"
- Released: January 1990
- Length: 3:18 (album version); 4:05 (U.S. remix)
- Label: Hansa; Arista
- Songwriters: Frank Farian; Brad Howell; P. G. Wilder; David Clayton-Thomas (uncredited)
- Producer: Frank Farian

Milli Vanilli singles chronology
"Girl I'm Gonna Miss You" (1989)	"All or Nothing" (1990)	"Keep on Running" (1990)

Music video
- "All or Nothing" on YouTube

"All or Nothing" is a song by German dance-pop group Milli Vanilli. It was released in January 1990 and was their final top 10 single, peaking at number four in the United States. This was their second to final single before the lip syncing scandal. In November 1990, the duo's manager, Frank Farian, publicly announced that he had fired Fab Morvan and Rob Pilatus. He also confirmed long standing rumors that Morvan and Pilatus did not actually sing on any Milli Vanilli releases. Session singers had provided the lead vocals while Morvan and Pilatus lip synced to the recorded tracks when performing live.

In December 1990, singer-songwriter David Clayton-Thomas sued Milli Vanilli for copyright infringement, alleging that "All or Nothing" used the melody from his 1968 song "Spinning Wheel", a hit for his group Blood, Sweat & Tears. The lawsuit was apparently settled out of court. In a 2015 interview, Clayton-Thomas recalled, "I called my publishing lawyer and said, 'Hey! We've got an infringement here.' And sure enough, it was an infringement, and they had to pay me for it."

== Charts ==
=== Weekly charts ===
Chart (1990)	Peak position
Australia (ARIA)	44
Austria (Ö3 Austria Top 40)	14
Belgium (Ultratop 50 Flanders)	12
Canada Top Singles (RPM)	9
Europe (Eurochart Hot 100)	44
France (SNEP)	44
Netherlands (Dutch Top 40)	11
Netherlands (Single Top 100)	9
New Zealand (Recorded Music NZ)	1
Switzerland (Schweizer Hitparade)	22
UK Singles (Official Charts)	74
US Billboard Hot 100	4
US Dance Singles Sales (Billboard)	49
US Hot R&B/Hip-Hop Songs (Billboard)	54
West Germany (GfK)	17

=== Year-end charts ===
Chart (1990)	Position
Canada Top Singles (RPM)	75
US Billboard Hot 100	79
