= DJ Spen =

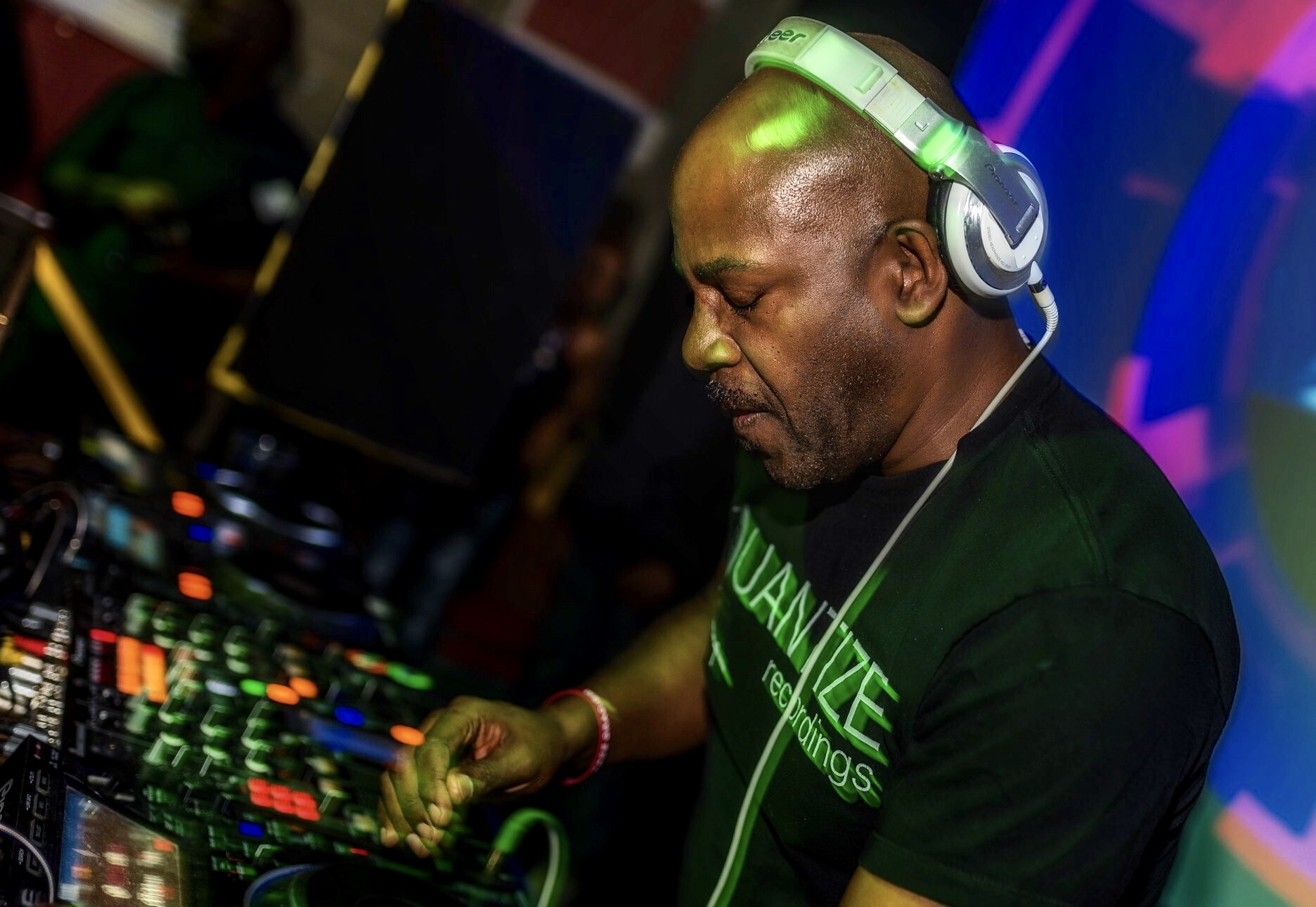
- DJ Spen in 2018

Background information
- Born: Sean Spencer; October 13, 1968 (age 57)
- Genres: Hip hop, dance music
- Occupations: DJ, record producer, record executive
- Years active: 1981–present

Sean Spencer (born October 13, 1968), better known by his stage name DJ Spen or Spen, is an American DJ, record producer, and record executive.

== Music career ==
Spencer got his start, at the age of 13, as a local DJ in Baltimore, Maryland, making mix tapes for local radio shows and playing parties. In 1983, Spencer started the hip hop group Numarx with Kevin Liles, Rodney "Kool Rod" Holloman, Darryl "Junie Jams" Mims, and Wayne Mallory. With Kool Rod and Junie Jams as the MCs, the group performed around Baltimore and the surrounding areas and opened for acts such as LL Cool J and Run-DMC. Numarx released the song "Buss It" on KMA Records in 1984.

Later Spencer, Liles, and Holloman (along with Bill Pettaway and Ky Adeyemo) wrote "Girl You Know It's True", which became a popular hit in German nightclubs and was eventually heard by Milli Vanilli producer Frank Farian. Milli Vanilli's version of the song was a major worldwide hit single. Numarx released the album Our Time Has Come, featuring their own version of "Girl You Know It's True", in 1988.

Spen also worked for several Baltimore-area-radio stations, including V-103, WERQ-FM "92Q", WKYS-FM, and WWIN-FM "Majic 95.9" (where he started the popular Flashback Saturday Night Dance Party). He eventually became the Mix Show Director at V-103.

In 1989, Spen moved away from hip hop and joined the dance music production team The Basement Boys, who remixed or produced artists such as Paula Abdul, Michael Jackson, Crystal Waters, and Ultra Nate. Karizma later joined the group and was DJ Spen's production partner. The two often produced under the alias Deepah Ones. Spen completed a full-length dance music production called A Feelin' in 1995.

Spen continued to work with the Basement Boys for several years before starting a business venture called Code Red Recordings in 2004. During this period he also founded a production team called the Muthafunkaz which released recordings on Code Red. In 2011 he founded Quantize Recordings and serves as the president and CEO.

Spen continues to perform internationally and has appeared at Ministry of Sound; Coachella, Southport, Weekender UK, and SunceBeat Festival Croatia. In 2018, Spen and Italian producer Michele Chiavarini scored a number 1 on Billboard's Dance Club Songs chart with their remix of Donna Summer's Hot Stuff. Also in 2018, Quantize Recordings had a #1 Billboard Dance Chart song with Barbara Tucker's cover of the Lyn Collins song "Think (About It)". In 2020, Spen produced the song "Party People" with Crystal Waters. In 2021, the Louie Vega remix of Spen's production “Praying For You” was nominated for a Grammy Award.

In December 2023, Spen released his Remix Masterclass educational course for music producers.
