= Chilly (band) =

German Eurodisco band

Chilly was a German Eurodisco and rock band from 1978 to 1983. The members of Chilly were Ute Weber (lead singer), Brad Howell (singer), Werner Suedhoff (dancer), Andrea Linz (dancer), Sofia Ejango (dancer), and Oscar Pearson (dancer).

They were created and produced by the producer, composer, and book author Bernt Möhrle. Their debut album "For Your Love" included a music melody of the title song "For Your Love", recorded with an arrangement by Christian Kolonovits and Bernt Möhrle. The original "For Your Love" song was a Yardbirds hit released in 1965, written by Graham Gouldman. Möhrle added new lyrics and composed additional music to the arrangement "I Walk Alone" and the nearly 12-minute suite became an international disco hit. It remained on the Billboard dance club songs charts for 7 weeks peaking at number 38 in April 1979. His version was used and remixed among others by DJ Hell on the album Munich Machine. It was also re-released in 2006 by the French label D-Classics in an edited version called "4 Love" made by Dylan Petit, and in 2011 by Chocolate Puma feat. Colonel Red.

== Discography ==
- For Your Love (1978)
- Come to L.A. (1979)
- Showbiz (1980)
- Johnny Loves Jenny (1981)
- Secret Lies (1982)
- Devils Dance (1983)
