= Girl You Know It's True (album) =

Studio album (reissue) by Milli Vanilli
- Released: 7 March 1989
- Recorded: 1988
- Studios: Far Studios, Rosbach
- Genres: R&B; hip hop; dance
- Length: 44:15 (first edition); 43:09 (second edition); 43:36 (third edition)
- Label: Arista
- Producer: Frank Farian

Milli Vanilli chronology
All or Nothing (1988)	Girl You Know It's True (1989)	All or Nothing: The U.S.-Remix Album (1989)

Singles from Girl You Know It's True
- 1. "Girl You Know It's True" Released: 24 November 1988; 2. "Baby Don't Forget My Number" Released: 9 April 1989; 3. "Girl I'm Gonna Miss You" Released: 10 July 1989; 4. "Blame It on the Rain" Released: 7 October 1989; 5. "All or Nothing" Released: 15 January 1990

Professional ratings
Review scores
Source	Rating
AllMusic	3/5 stars
Los Angeles Times	2.5/5 stars
The Rolling Stone Album Guide	2/5 stars

Girl You Know It's True is the reissue of All or Nothing (1988), the debut studio album by German R&B duo Milli Vanilli. Released in 1989, the reissue features several of the original album tracks replaced and/or remixed for the North American market. It served as the North American debut for the group and was a major success in the US, producing five singles that entered the top 5 of the Billboard Hot 100, three of which reached the top position.

In January 1990, Girl You Know It's True was certified 6× platinum by the RIAA after spending seven weeks atop the Billboard Top 200. Additionally, the album spent 41 weeks within the top 10 of the Billboard Top 200 and 78 weeks within the charts overall. The album was also certified Diamond in Canada, denoting shipments of over one million units. The success of the album earned the duo a Grammy Award for Best New Artist on 22 February 1990.

According to producer Frank Farian, the decision to repackage All or Nothing as Girl You Know It's True was made by Arista Records president Clive Davis. In addition to including five of the tracks that originally appeared on All or Nothing ("I'm Gonna Miss You", "All or Nothing", "Baby Don't Forget My Number", "Dreams to Remember" and "Girl You Know It's True"), Girl You Know It's True featured several new tracks, including "Blame It on the Rain", which would go on to be a worldwide hit single, reaching number one on the Billboard Hot 100. In Europe, the track later appeared in an extended version on the 1989 album All or Nothing - The U.S. Remix Album.

On 16 November 1990, Los Angeles Times reporter Chuck Philips reported that the group, which consisted of reputed vocalists Rob Pilatus and Fab Morvan, did not sing a single note on the album. Arista Records dropped the act from its roster and deleted their album and its masters from their catalog, making it one of the largest-selling albums to ever be deleted. In addition to this, their Grammy Award was revoked, marking the only time a Grammy was ever rescinded from an artist.

== Track listing ==
Side A
No.	Title	Writer(s)	Length
1.	"Girl You Know It's True"	Ky Adeyemo; Rodney Holloman; Kevin Liles; Bill Pettaway Jr.; Sean Spencer	4:13
2.	"Baby Don't Forget My Number"	Frank Farian; B. Nail	6:28/4:16
3.	"More Than You'll Ever Know"	Ernesto Phillips	4:00/4:32
4.	"Blame It on the Rain"	Diane Warren	4:19
5.	"Take It as It Comes"	Climie Fisher; Dennis Morgan	3:41/4:15

Side B
No.	Title	Writer(s)	Length
1.	"It's Your Thing"	O'Kelly Isley; Ronald Isley; Rudolph Isley	3:51
2.	"Dreams to Remember"	Farian; Mary Applegate; Dietmar Kawohl	3:54
3.	"All or Nothing"	Farian; Nail; P. G. Wilder	3:17
4.	"I'm Gonna Miss You"	Farian; Kawohl; Peter Bischoff Fallenstein	3:57/4:24
5.	"Girl You Know It's True" (N.Y. Subway Extended Mix)	Adeyemo; Halloway; Liles; Pettaway Jr.; Spencer	6:27

- Several variations of the album exist, featuring different mixes of tracks 2, 3, 5 and 9.

== Personnel ==
Credits adapted from CD liner notes, except where noted.

Milli Vanilli

- Rob Pilatus – visual performance (credited with "vocals")
- Fab Morvan – visual performance (credited with "vocals")

Musicians

- P. G. Wilder – keyboards
- Pit Loew – keyboards
- Volker Barber – keyboards
- Peter Weihe – guitars
- Jens Gad – guitars
- Bruce Ingram – guitars
- Curt Cress – drums
- Mel Collins – saxophone
- Dino Solera – horns
- Felice Civitareale – horns
- Franz Weyerer – horns
- Jodie Rocco – backing vocals
- Linda Rocco – backing vocals
- Joan Faulkner – backing vocals
- Felicia Taylor – backing vocals
- The Jackson Singers – backing vocals
- John Davis – lead vocals (credited with "backing vocals")
- Charles Shaw – lead vocals (credited with "backing vocals")
- Herbert Gebhard – backing vocals
- Birney Oberreit – backing vocals
- Peter Rishavy – backing vocals
- Brad Howell – lead vocals
- Gina Mohammed – backing vocals

Technical

- Frank Farian – producer
- P. G. Wilder – arranger
- Pit Loew – arranger
- Dino Solera – horn arranger
- Tobias Freund – engineer
- Bernd Berwanger – engineer
- Norbert Janicke – engineer
- Jens Seekamp – engineer
- Marlene Cohen – design
- Paul Cox – photography (front)
- M. Esser – photography (back)
- H. Strauss – photography (back)

== Charts ==
=== Weekly charts ===
Weekly chart performance for Girl You Know It's True
Chart (1989–1990)	Peak position
Canadian Albums (Billboard)	1
US Billboard 200	1

== Certifications ==
Certifications for Girl You Know It's True
Region	Certification	Certified units/sales
Canada (Music Canada)	Diamond	1,000,000^{^}
United States (RIAA)	6× Platinum	7,000,000
Summaries
Worldwide	—	10,000,000
^{^} Shipments figures based on certification alone.
