= All or Nothing (Milli Vanilli album) =

Studio album by Milli Vanilli
- Released: 14 November 1988
- Recorded: 1988
- Studio: Far Studios, Rosbach
- Genre: Dance-pop; new jack swing; R&B
- Length: 45:48
- Label: Hansa; BMG
- Producer: Frank Farian

Milli Vanilli chronology
All or Nothing (1988)	Girl You Know It's True (1989)

Singles from All Or Nothing
- 1. "Girl You Know It's True" Released: 27 June 1988; 2. "Baby Don't Forget My Number" Released: 12 December 1988; 3. "Girl I'm Gonna Miss You" Released: 10 July 1989; 4. "All or Nothing" Released: 15 January 1990

All or Nothing is the debut studio album by German dance pop duo Milli Vanilli, released only outside of North America in November 1988. All or Nothing was a moderate success, reaching the top 40 in several European countries and number 1 in New Zealand. It originally reached number 37 in the UK, but was packaged together with The U.S.-Remix Album: All or Nothing in 1989 under the name 2×2 and reached number 6.

All or Nothing was not issued in the U.S. and was replaced by the album Girl You Know It's True (1989), which had a different set of tracks but retained the songs "Baby Don't Forget My Number", "Girl You Know It's True", "I'm Gonna Miss You" and "All or Nothing", all of which would reach the top five in the U.S. charts. However, All or Nothing is available on Apple Music in the U.S.

In November 1990, it was revealed that Fab Morvan and Rob Pilatus of Milli Vanilli did not perform the vocals for any of their music and were lip-synching in concert. The 1991 reissue of All or Nothing would add a disclaimer sticker on the cover that explicitly named the singers who provided vocals on the album—namely John Davis, Brad Howell, Charles Shaw and Gina Mohammed—although it omitted the names of Jodie and Linda Rocco. Mohammed went on to garner a bigger role in the follow-up group, the Real Milli Vanilli.

In December, singer-songwriter David Clayton-Thomas sued Milli Vanilli for copyright infringement, alleging that "All or Nothing" used the melody from his 1968 composition "Spinning Wheel", a hit for his group Blood, Sweat & Tears.

All or Nothing was included in Q magazine's 2006 list of the 50 worst albums ever made.

== Track listing ==
Side A
No.	Title	Writer(s)	Length
1.	"Can't You Feel My Love"	Toby Gad; Jens Gad	3:32
2.	"Boy in the Tree"	T. Gad; J. Gad	3:10
3.	"Money"	Frank Farian; Michael Newman; Kerim Saka	4:09
4.	"Dance with a Devil"	Farian; P. G. Wilder; Newman; Jayne Collins	3:12
5.	"Girl I'm Gonna Miss You"	Farian; Dietmar Kawohl; Peter Bischoff Fallenstein	3:59
6.	"All or Nothing"	Farian; Wilder; Brad Nail	3:19

Side B
No.	Title	Writer(s)	Length
1.	"Baby Don't Forget My Number"	Farian; Nail	4:09
2.	"Dreams to Remember"	Farian; Kawohl; Mary Applegate	3:56
3.	"Is It Love"	T. Gad; J. Gad	3:22
4.	"Ma Baker"	Farian; Fred Jay; George Reyam	4:24
5.	"Girl You Know It's True" (Maxi Version - Super Club Mix)	Bill Pettaway; Sean Spencer; Kevin Lyles; Rodney Hollaman; Ky Adeyemo	8:48
6.	"Hush"	Joe South	3:12
Total length:			44:58

CD bonus track
No.	Title	Writer(s)	Length
13.	"Too Much Monkey Business" (Maxi Version)	Farian	1:48
Total length:			45:48

== Personnel ==
Credits adapted from CD liner notes, except where noted.

Milli Vanilli

- Rob Pilatus – visual performance
- Fab Morvan – visual performance

Musicians

- P.G. Wilder – keyboards
- Toby Gad – keyboards
- Pit Loew – keyboards
- Volker Barber – keyboards
- Peter Weihe – guitars
- Jens Gad – guitars
- Curt Cress – drums
- Mel Collins – saxophone
- Dino Solera – horns
- Felice Civitareale – horns
- Franz Weyerer – horns
- Jodie Rocco – backing vocals
- Linda Rocco – backing vocals
- Felicia Taylor – backing vocals
- The Jackson Singers – backing vocals
- Charles Shaw – lead vocals, backing vocals
- Herbert Gebhard – backing vocals
- Bimey Oberreit – backing vocals
- Peter Rishavy – backing vocals
- John Davis – lead vocals
- Brad Howell – lead vocals
- Gina Mohammed – backing vocals

Technical

- Frank Farian – producer
- P.G. Wilder – arranger
- Pit Loew – arranger
- Toby Gad – arranger
- Jens Gad – arranger
- Dino Solera – horn arranger
- Tobias Freund – engineer
- Bernd Berwanger – engineer
- Norbert Janicke – engineer
- Jens Seekamp – engineer
- Esser & Strauss – photos
- Mago-Design – styling
- Hans Wegner – cover

== Charts ==
=== Weekly charts ===
Chart (1988–1989)	Peak position
Austrian Albums (Ö3 Austria)	13
Dutch Albums (Album Top 100)	36
German Albums (Offizielle Top 100)	22
New Zealand Albums (RMNZ)	1
Swedish Albums (Sverigetopplistan)	29
Swiss Albums (Schweizer Hitparade)	5
UK Albums (OCC) as 2×2	6

=== Year-end charts ===
Chart (1989)	Position
New Zealand Albums (RMNZ)	16
Chart (1990)	Position
Austrian Albums (Ö3 Austria)	16

== Certifications ==
Region	Certification	Certified units/sales
Germany (BVMI)	Gold	250,000^{^}
New Zealand (RMNZ)	Platinum	15,000^{^}
Spain (Promusicae)	Gold	300,000
United Kingdom (BPI)	Silver	60,000^{^}
^{^} Shipments figures based on certification alone.
