= Too Late (True Love) =

Single by The Real Milli Vanilli

from the album The Moment of Truth
- B-side: "Dance with the Devil"
- Released: 1991
- Genre: Pop
- Length: 4:02
- Label: Hansa
- Songwriters: M. Wonder; K. Saka; T. Coogler; B. Pettaway; K. Adeyemo; G. Phillips
- Producer: Frank Farian

The Real Milli Vanilli singles chronology
"Keep On Running" (1990)	"Too Late (True Love)" (1991)	"Nice 'n' Easy" (1991)

"Too Late (True Love)" is a song by the Real Milli Vanilli. It was released as a single in 1991 and peaked at No. 26 in Austria and No. 65 in Germany. The song was also released in France, but failed to enter the singles chart.

== Track listing ==
CD maxi single
No.	Title	Length
1.	"Too Late (True Love)" (Club Mix)	6:00
2.	"Too Late (True Love)" (Radio Version)	4:09
3.	"Too Late (True Love)" (Saka Wonder Club Mix)	6:05
4.	"Dance with the Devil" (Remix)	3:09

== Charts ==
Chart performance for "Too Late (True Love)"
Chart (1991)	Peak position
Australia (ARIA)	181
Austria (Ö3 Austria Top 40)	26
Belgium (Ultratop 50 Flanders)	36
Germany (GfK)	65
Netherlands (Single Top 100)	54
