= Keep On Running (The Real Milli Vanilli song) =

Single by Milli Vanilli / the Real Milli Vanilli

from the album The Moment of Truth
- B-side: "The End of Good Times"
- Released: 5 November 1990
- Genre: Dance; reggae
- Length: 3:58
- Label: Hansa
- Songwriters: Chris Kindt; Frank Farian; Franz Reuther
- Producer: Frank Farian

Milli Vanilli / the Real Milli Vanilli singles chronology
"All or Nothing" (1989)	"Keep On Running" (1990)	"Too Late (True Love)" (1991)

Alternative cover
- With real voices of Milli Vanilli

"Keep on Running" is a song credited to German pop group Milli Vanilli before and during the lip-synching scandal and later credited to the Real Milli Vanilli after. It was co-written and produced by Frank Farian and released in November 1990, by Hansa Records. The song peaked at number two in Austria, number four in Germany, number six in Italy and number eight in Switzerland. It was also released in France, but failed to enter the singles chart, as did "Too Late (True Love)". "Keep on Running" would be the duo's final single as Milli Vanilli, and was the first single of the Real Milli Vanilli.

== Critical reception ==
Gary Crossing from Record Mirror wrote, "It's nice to see these boys back in the forefront of the dance music scene after having their reputations sallied by some unsavoury accusations with regards to their vocal talents. Here they're in someone else's fine voices with this busy stonker of a floor filler, which occasionally lapses into a 'Dreadlock Holiday' stylee reggae lilt. I'm speechless."

== Track listings ==
- CD maxi
1. "Keep on Running" (Club Mix) — 6:40
2. "The End of Good Times" — 4:09
3. "Keep on Running" (Running Man Mix) — 5:45
4. "Keep on Running" (Radio Version) — 4:04
- 7-inch single
1. "Keep on Running" — 3:58
2. "The End of Good Times" — 3:45
- 12-inch maxi
1. "Keep on Running" (Club Mix) — 6:15
2. "The End of Good Times" — 3:35
3. "Keep on Running" (Running Man Mix) — 5:45
4. "Keep on Running" (Radio Mix) — 3:58
- "Real Voices of Milli Vanilli" CD maxi
1. "Keep on Running" (Club Mix) — 7:50
2. "The End of Good Times" — 3:39
3. "Keep on Running" (Running Man Mix) — 5:45
4. "Keep on Running" (Radio Version) — 4:04

== Charts ==
=== Weekly charts ===
Weekly chart performance for "Keep On Running"
Chart (1990–1991)	Peak position
Australia (ARIA)	62
Austria (Ö3 Austria Top 40)	2
Belgium (Ultratop 50 Flanders)	14
Europe (Eurochart Hot 100)	9
Europe (European Hit Radio)	23
Finland (Suomen virallinen lista)	7
Germany (GfK)	4
Italy (Musica e dischi)	6
Netherlands (Dutch Top 40)	9
Netherlands (Single Top 100)	7
Portugal (AFP)	6
Spain (AFYVE)	3
Switzerland (Schweizer Hitparade)	8
UK Singles (Official Charts)	76
UK Airplay (Music Week)	48

=== Year-end charts ===
Annual chart rankings for "Keep On Running"
Chart (1990)	Position
Netherlands (Single Top 100)	65

Chart (1991)	Position
Austria (Ö3 Austria Top 40)	9
Europe (Eurochart Hot 100)	46
Germany (Media Control)	21
Italy (Musica e dischi)	50

=== Decade-end charts ===
Chart (1990–1999)	Rank
Austria (Ö3 Austria Top 40)	89

== Certifications ==
Certifications for Keep On Running
Region	Certification	Certified units/sales
Austria (IFPI Austria)	Gold	25,000^{*}
Germany (BVMI)	Gold	250,000^{^}
^{*} Sales figures based on certification alone.^{^} Shipments figures based on certification alone.
