= The Moment of Truth (The Real Milli Vanilli album) =

1991 studio album

Studio album by the Real Milli Vanilli
- Released: 1991
- Recorded: 1990
- Studios: Far Studios, Rosbach
- Genres: Dance; pop
- Length: 43:53
- Labels: Hansa; BMG
- Producer: Frank Farian

Milli Vanilli chronology
The Remix Album (1990)	The Moment of Truth (1991)	Rob & Fab (1992)

Singles from The Moment of Truth
- 1. "Keep on Running" Released: 24 November 1990; 2. "Too Late (True Love)" Released: 1991; 3. "Nice 'n' Easy" Released: 1991

The Moment of Truth is the only studio album by German pop group the Real Milli Vanilli, released in 1991.

== Background ==
The Real Milli Vanilli
- Also known as: Try 'N' B
- Origin: Munich, Germany
- Genres: Dance-pop; hip hop; new jack swing
- Years active: 1990–1992
- Spinoff of: Milli Vanilli
- Past members: Brad Howell; John Davis; Gina Mohammed; Ray Horton; Michael Byron

The original Milli Vanilli was a pop duo from Munich, Germany, that comprised Fab Morvan and Rob Pilatus. It was founded in 1988 by the producer Frank Farian. Farian hired the studio vocalists Brad Howell, John Davis, Charles Shaw, Jodie Rocco and Linda Rocco to sing on the records, and had Morvan and Pilatus dance and lip-sync for performances.

In November 1990, Farian confirmed that Morvan and Pilatus did not sing on their records, leading to a backlash. Farian defended Milli Vanilli as an art project combining musical and visual elements. Their second album and 1991 tour were canceled.

Farian repurposed songs planned for Milli Vanilli's second album as The Moment of Truth, released in 1991 under the name the Real Milli Vanilli, with Davis and Howell as the singers. It was never released in America.

== Track listing ==
No.	Title	Writer(s)	Length
1.	"Keep on Running"	Frank Farian; Franz Reuther; Chris Kindt	4:06
2.	"Tell Me Where It Hurts"	Diane Warren	4:05
3.	"Crazy Cane"	Mike Wonder; Kerim Saka; Leo Slater; Cab Calloway	3:55
4.	"When I Die"	Farian; Dietmar Kawohl; Peter Bischof-Fallenstein; Warren	4:00
5.	"Body Slam"	Farian; Wonder; Saka; Ralf Battle	2:22
6.	"Nice 'n' Easy"	Farian; P. G. Wylder; Robert Rayen; Diane Warren	3:40
7.	"Hard as Hell"	Farian; Saka; Slater; Warren	3:58
8.	"In My Life"	Clyde Lieberman; Jeff Pescetto; Richard James Burgess	3:50
9.	"Too Late (True Love)"	Wonder; Saka; Tanya Coogler; Bill Pettaway; Ky Adeyemo; George Phillips	3:45
10.	"The End of Good Times"	Farian; Wylder; Mary Susan Applegate	3:45
11.	"I'll Be Loving You"	Mike Sutton; Brenda Sutton	3:30
12.	"Big Brother"	Dino Fekaris; Nick Zesses	3:58
Total length:			43:53

== Personnel ==
=== The Real Milli Vanilli ===
- John Davis – vocals, backing vocals
- Brad Howell – vocals
- Gina Mohammed – vocals
- Ray Horton – vocals
- Linda Rocco – vocals
- Jodie Rocco-Hafner – vocals

=== Additional musicians ===
- Joan Faulkner – backing vocals
- Frank Farian – backing vocals, production
- Franco Dittman – backing vocals
- P.G. Wylder – keyboards, arrangements, programming
- Marc Dalton – guitars
- Peter Weihe – guitars
- Ed DeGenaro – guitars
- Mike Wonder – programming
- Kerim Saka – programming
- Tobias Freund – programming, engineering
- Mel Collins – saxophone
- Dino Solera – horns
- Felice Civitareale – horns
- Claus Reichstaller – horns
- Curt Cress – drums

=== Technical personnel ===
- Bernd Berwan – engineering
- Helmut Rulofs – engineering
- Michael Bestmann – engineering
- Norbert G. Yanicke – engineering
- Milli-Ingrid Segieth – production coordinator
- Hans Wegner – cover design
- Helge Strauß, Manfred Esser – photography

== Charts ==
=== Weekly charts ===
Chart (1991)	Peak position
Austrian Albums (Ö3 Austria)	6
Dutch Albums (Album Top 100)	56
German Albums (Offizielle Top 100)	19
Portugal (AFP)	8
Swiss Albums (Schweizer Hitparade)	19

== Certifications ==
Certifications for The Moment of Truth
Region	Certification	Certified units/sales
Austria (IFPI Austria)	Gold	25,000^{*}
^{*} Sales figures based on certification alone.

== Try 'N' B ==
Seven of the songs from The Moment of Truth were reworked and released by RCA in 1992 under the band name Try 'N' B, as an eponymous album, with the addition of Tracy Ganser and Kevin Weatherspoon on vocals. The album contained three additional songs: "Ding Dong", "Who Do You Love", and a cover version of Dr. Hook's "Sexy Eyes".

Try 'N' B

Studio album by Try 'N' B
- Released: 1992
- Recorded: 1990
- Genres: Dance, pop
- Label: RCA
- Producer: Frank Farian

=== Track listing ===
No.	Title	Writer(s)	Length
1.	"Tell Me Where It Hurts"	Diane Warren	4:09
2.	"Keep on Running"	Frank Farian; Franz Reuther; Chris Kindt	5:13
3.	"Ding Dong"	Kerim Saka; Mike Wonder	3:48
4.	"When I Die"	Farian; Dietmar Kawohl; Peter Bischof-Fallenstein; Warren	4:21
5.	"Body Slam"	Farian; Wonder; Saka; Ralf Battle	3:23
6.	"Sexy Eyes"	Chris Waters; Keith Stegall; R.J. Mather	4:04
7.	"In My Life"	Clyde Lieberman; Jeff Pescetto; Richard James Burgess	4:07
8.	"The End of Good Times"	Farian; P.G. Wylder; Mary Susan Applegate	4:18
9.	"Nice 'n' Easy"	Farian; Wylder; Robert Rayen; Warren	3:45
10.	"Who Do You Love"	John Davis	5:22

=== Personnel ===
- Frank Farian – production
- P.G. Wylder – keyboards, arrangements, programming
- Marc Dalton, Peter Weihe – guitars
- Mike Wonder – arrangements, programming
- Kerim Saka – arrangements, programming
- Tobias Freund – programming, engineering
- Mel Collins – saxophone
- Dino Solera, Felice Civitareale, Claus Reichstaller – horns
- Bernd Berwanger, Todd Canedy, Helmut Rulofs, Michael Bestmann, Norbert G. Yanicke – engineering
- Milli-Ingrid Segieth – production coordination
- Mike Schraft – photos
- Jacqueline Murphy – logo design
