= John Davis (singer) =

American singer (1954–2021)

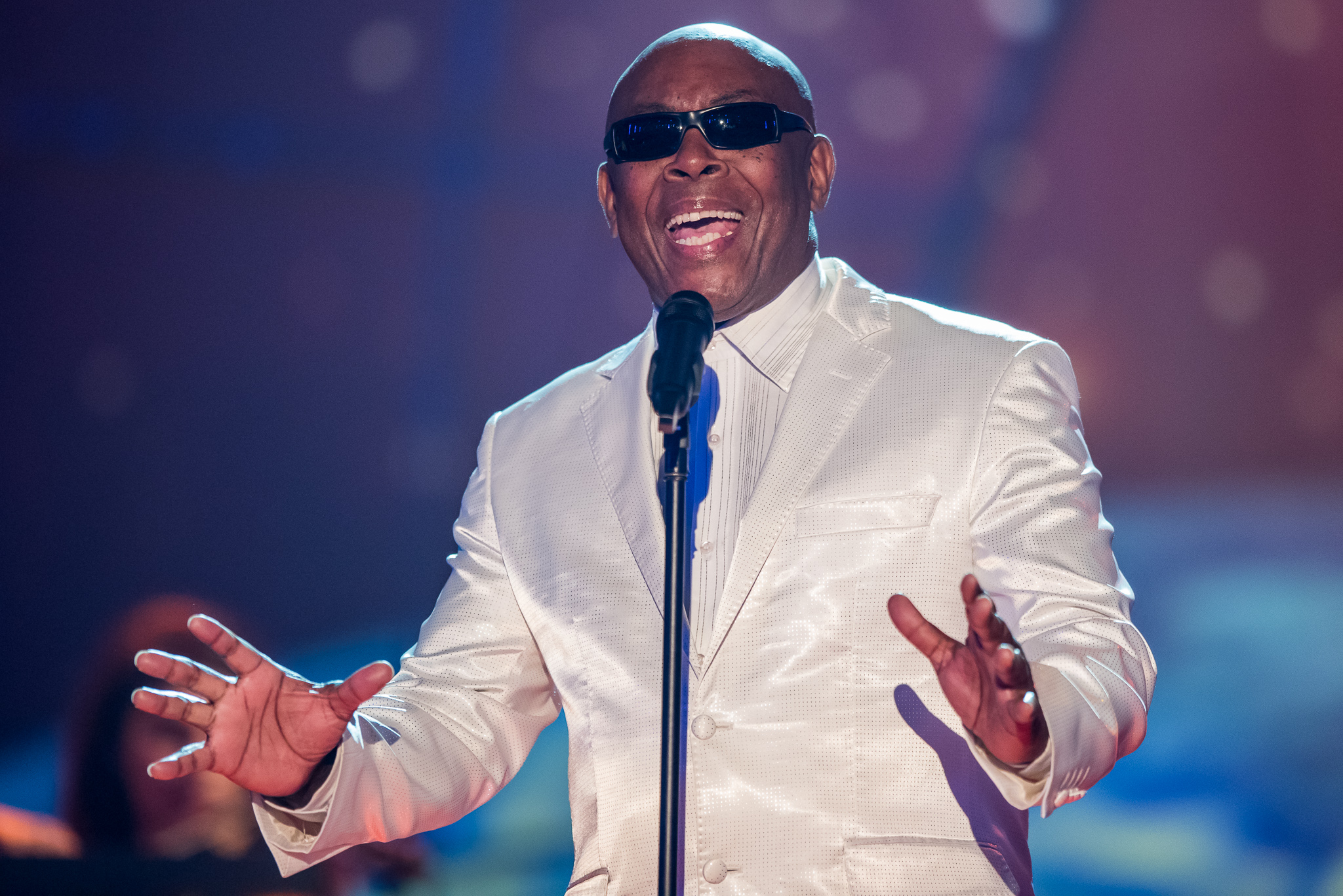
- Davis in 2016
- Born: August 31, 1954; Anderson, South Carolina, U.S.
- Died: May 24, 2021 (aged 66); Nuremberg, Germany
- Occupation: Singer

John Davis (August 31, 1954 – May 24, 2021) was an American singer based in Germany. He, along with Brad Howell, Charles Shaw and backup vocalists Linda Rocco & Jodie Rocco, provided the real vocals for Milli Vanilli.

== Early life ==
Davis was born on August 31, 1954, in Anderson, South Carolina. Davis lived most of his life in Germany after he was stationed there in the 1970s while serving in the US Army.

== Career ==
During the 1970s, Davis played his music in Army clubs in Germany. He began singing for Milli Vanilli in 1988 after meeting German music producer Frank Farian. Farian approached Davis to work on a project with him, but did not disclose the details of the project, which were that Davis's voice would be used for other performers to lip-sync. Davis realized only later that his voice was being used by Fab Morvan, one of two pretend singers of the duo Milli Vanilli, the other being Rob Pilatus. Morvan and Davis performed together on the project "Face Meets Voice" in later years, and they appeared together on German television in 2015.

=== Albums ===
In 1984, Davis released an electro album called Destination Earth. After it was revealed that Morvan and Pilatus were not the true singers for Milli Vanilli, Farian re-did the album that was already planned for the original duo which had been intended to be called Keep On Running which was renamed to the 1991 album The Moment of Truth, and the duo, Davis and Brad Howell, the Real Milli Vanilli. The album was the only one the pair made, and it was never released in the US. It made it to Germany's Top 20 albums.

== Personal life and death ==
Davis had a daughter, Jasmine Davis.

Davis died in Nuremberg, Germany, from COVID-19 on May 24, 2021, at the age of 66.
