= Charles Shaw (singer) =

American rapper and singer (born 1960)

Charles Shaw (born July 4, 1960, in Houston, Texas) is an American rapper and singer who, in 1988, performed on recordings credited to Milli Vanilli.

== Milli Vanilli ==
Shaw, a U.S. Army veteran, was reportedly paid $6,000 to perform the rap on Milli Vanilli's 1988 hit single "Girl You Know It's True". In December 1989, Shaw disclosed to New York Newsday writer John Leland that he was one of three singers on Milli Vanilli's hit debut album, and that Milli Vanilli frontmen Rob Pilatus and Fab Morvan were impostors. Milli Vanilli producer Frank Farian reportedly paid Shaw $150,000 to retract his statements and fired him, replacing him with John Davis, who became the new Milli Vanilli rapper.

Morvan and Pilatus went on to win the Grammy Award for Best New Artist on February 22, 1990, but rumors about Shaw's involvement persisted. Eventually, the true story of Milli Vanilli was exposed later that year, when Farian broke it himself, and the duo's Grammy was withdrawn.

Farian re-launched the group in 1991 as the Real Milli Vanilli, using Brad Howell and John Davis, the singers from the original studio sessions. This group lasted for one album, The Moment of Truth, which would have been the second Milli Vanilli record, before the scandal. A revised version of the album was later released in the United States, with the group renamed Try 'N' B.

== Other work ==
In 1986, Shaw collaborated with Czech composer Ondřej Soukup on the soundtrack to the 1988 Czechoslovak film Bony a klid.

In 1994, Shaw released the single "I'm Feeling", featuring the vocals of Sandra Chambers, and in 1995, he issued the single "Gotta Fever".
