= Blame It on the Rain =

1989 single by Milli Vanilli

- US cover

Single by Milli Vanilli

from the album Girl You Know It's True
- B-side: "Dance with a Devil"
- Released: July 1989
- Genre: Dance-pop
- Length: 4:19 (album version); 4:08 (single version)
- Label: Hansa; Arista
- Songwriter: Diane Warren
- Producer: Frank Farian

Milli Vanilli singles chronology
"Baby Don't Forget My Number" (1988)	"Blame It on the Rain" (1989)	"Girl I'm Gonna Miss You" (1989)

Music video
- "Blame It on the Rain" on YouTube

"Blame It on the Rain" is a song written by Diane Warren and performed by the German dance-pop group Milli Vanilli. It was released as a new track from the group's North American debut album, Girl You Know It's True (1989), and did not appear on All or Nothing (1988), their debut album in other regions. An extended remix of the song did appear on The U.S.-Remix Album: All or Nothing (1989), which served to release the new tracks included on Girl You Know It's True that did not appear on All or Nothing outside of North America.

The song is written in the second person, and the protagonist is advising the listener to "blame it on the rain" and other natural elements after leaving their lover and regretting it. The song topped the US Billboard Hot 100, becoming Milli Vanilli's third and final single to do so. It also reached the top 10 in Australia, Canada, and New Zealand, as well as in several European countries. In the United Kingdom, the song did not enter the top 40, originally peaking at number 52, but it would go on to peak at number 47 in October 2024.

== Background ==
The song had originally been intended for the sibling group the Jets. When the band did not record it, Arista Records president Clive Davis suggested to Warren that it would be a good fit for Milli Vanilli.

== Composition ==
The verses are in the key of B♭ major and modulate up a half step to B major for the main chorus and modulate once more to C major during the final repetition of the chorus. It is originally 98 beats per minute and features a sparse bass line and heavy handclaps. The second music video version of the song differs in a few ways, most noticeably in the longer length and brass synth introduction absent in the album and single variations.

== Chart performance ==
"Blame It on the Rain" debuted on the US Billboard Hot 100 on 7 October 1989, at number sixty-five. Seven weeks later, for the week ending 25 November 1989, it reached number one and occupied the spot for two weeks. It also spent a total of 23 weeks on the Hot 100. The song became Milli Vanilli's third number one single on the Hot 100 after "Baby Don't Forget My Number" and "Girl I'm Gonna Miss You". The song was ranked at number 21 on Billboard's Year-End Singles list for 1989 and at number 46 for 1990.

== Critical reception ==
Harriet Dell from Smash Hits wrote, "Like "Girl You Know It's True" the dreadlocked boys of the too-tight-trouser fame have come up with another pleasant pop hit. It smooches along at a George Michael type pace, with some topper backing singers and some fab electronic goings on. This is surprisingly good...mmm, I'd even go as far as to say...I like it!"

== Track listings ==
- CD maxi
1. "Blame It on the Rain" (club mix) – 7:02
2. "Baby Don't Forget My Number" (European mix) – 4:55
- 7-inch single
1. "Blame It on the Rain" – 4:08
- 12-inch maxi
1. "Blame It on the Rain" (club mix) – 7:15
2. "Blame It on the Rain" (radio version) – 4:08

== Charts ==
=== Weekly charts ===
Chart (1989–1990)	Peak position
Australia (ARIA)	5
Austria (Ö3 Austria Top 40)	8
Belgium (Ultratop 50 Flanders)	6
Canada Retail Singles (The Record)	1
Canada Top Singles (RPM)	3
Canada Adult Contemporary (RPM)	2
Canada Dance/Urban (RPM)	7
Denmark (IFPI)	11
Europe (Eurochart Hot 100)	7
Finland (Suomen virallinen lista)	11
Italy Airplay (Music & Media)	19
Netherlands (Dutch Top 40)	2
Netherlands (Single Top 100)	2
New Zealand (Recorded Music NZ)	3
Spain (AFYVE)	8
Sweden (Sverigetopplistan)	6
Switzerland (Schweizer Hitparade)	22
UK Singles (Official Charts)	52
US Billboard Hot 100	1
US Adult Contemporary (Billboard)	27
US Dance Singles Sales (Billboard)	13
US Hot R&B/Hip-Hop Songs (Billboard)	14
US Cash Box Top 100	1
West Germany (GfK)	3

Chart (2024)	Peak position
UK Singles (Official Charts)	47

=== Year-end charts ===
Chart (1989)	Position
Austria (Ö3 Austria Top 40)	28
Belgium (Ultratop)	52
Canada Top Singles (RPM)	86
Europe (Eurochart Hot 100)	51
Netherlands (Dutch Top 40)	42
Netherlands (Single Top 100)	30
US Billboard Hot 100	21
West Germany (Media Control)	28

Chart (1990)	Position
Australia (ARIA)	46
Canada Top Singles (RPM)	73
Canada Adult Contemporary (RPM)	86
US Billboard Hot 100	46

== Certifications ==
Region	Certification	Certified units/sales
Australia (ARIA)	Gold	35,000^{^}
Canada (Music Canada)	Gold	50,000^{^}
New Zealand (RMNZ)	Gold	5,000^{*}
Sweden (GLF)	Gold	25,000^{^}
United States (RIAA)	Platinum	1,000,000^{^}
^{*} Sales figures based on certification alone.^{^} Shipments figures based on certification alone.
