= Girl I'm Gonna Miss You =

1989 single by Milli Vanilli

- Continental European and Australasian cover

Single by Milli Vanilli

from the album All or Nothing and Girl You Know It's True
- B-side: "Can't You Feel My Love"; "All or Nothing"; "More Than You'll Ever Know"; "Baby Don't Forget My Number"
- Released: 1 July 1989
- Length: 3:57 (album version); 4:19 (single version)
- Label: Hansa
- Songwriters: Frank Farian; Peter Bischof-Fallenstein; Dietmar Kawohl
- Producer: Frank Farian

Milli Vanilli singles chronology
"Blame It on the Rain" (1989)	"Girl I'm Gonna Miss You" (1989)	"All or Nothing" (1989)

Music video
- "Girl I'm Gonna Miss You" on YouTube

"Girl I'm Gonna Miss You" (titled as "I'm Gonna Miss You" on the album track listing) is a song by German dance-pop group Milli Vanilli. It was released in July 1989 as the fourth single from their debut album, All or Nothing (1988), as well as its American counterpart, Girl You Know It's True (1989). The single was a success, reaching number one on the US Billboard Hot 100 chart and being certified gold by the Recording Industry Association of America (RIAA). The song also reached number one in Austria, Belgium, Canada, the Netherlands and Switzerland; number two in Ireland, the United Kingdom and West Germany; and number three in Australia. In 2024, it was featured in the biographical crime drama series Monsters: The Lyle and Erik Menendez Story, which led to its re-entry onto multiple music charts, including the UK singles chart.

== Critical reception ==
Richard Lowe from Smash Hits wrote, "The Nilli's song is quite sweet. It's got a nice melody, gently plopping synths and a tasteful horn solo. Why, one could almost forgive them their trousers."

== Charts ==
=== Weekly charts ===
Chart (1989–1990)	Peak position
Australia (ARIA)	3
Austria (Ö3 Austria Top 40)	1
Belgium (Ultratop 50 Flanders)	1
Canada Retail Singles (The Record)	1
Canada Top Singles (RPM)	1
Canada Adult Contemporary (RPM)	4
Denmark (IFPI)	8
Europe (Eurochart Hot 100)	2
Finland (Suomen virallinen lista)	5
France (SNEP)	3
Ireland (IRMA)	2
Netherlands (Dutch Top 40)	1
Netherlands (Single Top 100)	1
New Zealand (Recorded Music NZ)	8
Norway (VG-lista)	4
Spain (AFYVE)	7
Sweden (Sverigetopplistan)	2
Switzerland (Schweizer Hitparade)	1
UK Singles (Official Charts)	2
US Billboard Hot 100	1
US Adult Contemporary (Billboard)	21
US Hot R&B/Hip-Hop Songs (Billboard)	20
West Germany (GfK)	2

Chart (2018)	Peak position
Slovenia (SloTop50)	34

Chart (2019)	Peak position
Slovenia (SloTop50)	32

Chart (2020)	Peak position
Slovenia (SloTop50)	17

Chart (2021)	Peak position
Slovenia (SloTop50)	26

Chart (2024)	Peak position
Iceland (Tónlistinn)	30
Lithuania (AGATA)	95
UK Singles (Official Charts)	40

=== Year-end charts ===
Chart (1989)	Position
Belgium (Ultratop)	8
Canada Top Singles (RPM)	18
Europe (Eurochart Hot 100)	12
Netherlands (Dutch Top 40)	3
Netherlands (Single Top 100)	2
UK Singles (OCC)	15
US Billboard Hot 100	16
West Germany (Media Control)	33

Chart (1990)	Position
Australia (ARIA)	9
Europe (Eurochart Hot 100)	37
Germany (Media Control)	25
Switzerland (Schweizer Hitparade)	13

== Certifications ==
Region	Certification	Certified units/sales
Australia (ARIA)	Platinum	70,000^{^}
Austria (IFPI Austria)	Platinum	50,000^{*}
Canada (Music Canada)	Gold	50,000^{^}
Germany (BVMI)	Platinum	500,000^{^}
Netherlands (NVPI)	Platinum	100,000^{^}
New Zealand (RMNZ)	Gold	15,000^{‡}
Sweden (GLF)	Gold	25,000^{^}
United Kingdom (BPI)	Silver	200,000^{^}
United States (RIAA)	Gold	500,000^{^}
^{*} Sales figures based on certification alone.^{^} Shipments figures based on certification alone.^{‡} Sales+streaming figures based on certification alone.
