= Kevin Liles =

American record executive

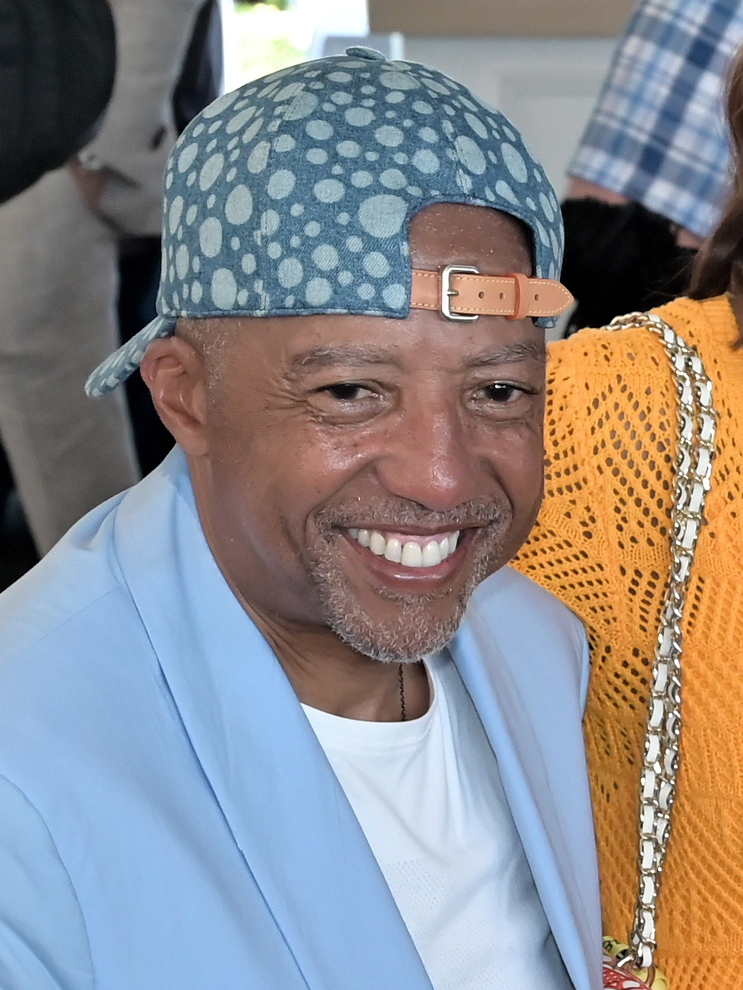
- Liles at the 2023 Preakness Stakes
- Born: February 27, 1968 (age 58); Baltimore, Maryland, U.S
- Education: Morgan State University (no degree)
- Occupation: Record executive
- Years active: 1986–present
- Spouse: Erika Liles (m. 2010)
- Children: 4

Signature
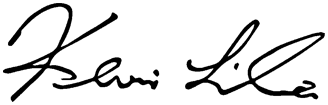

Kevin Liles (born February 27, 1968) is an American record executive who is the co-founder and CEO of 300 Entertainment. In 2020, Kevin was recognized by Billboard Magazine as R&B/Hip-Hop Executive of the Year for both his efforts in activism and the continued success of Megan Thee Stallion.

== Early life and education ==
Liles grew up near Baltimore, Maryland, and graduated from Woodlawn High School. He was raised by his mother, Alberta Fennoy, an accountant, and stepfather Jerome Fennoy, a railway conductor, along with three siblings. He attended Morgan State University, studying engineering on an electrical engineering scholarship from NASA, but left the program prior to graduating to pursue a musical career.

== Career ==
Liles began his music career as a member of the Baltimore-based DJ crew, Numarx. In 1986, the group co-wrote "Girl You Know It's True," which was first recorded by Numarx but later became a massive first hit for Milli Vanilli.

In 1992, Liles became an intern at Def Jam Recordings, working under the leadership of the company's president and CEO, Lyor Cohen. Two years later, he was promoted to general manager of promotions. In 1996, Liles was named general manager/vice president of promotions. By July 1998, Liles was named president of Def Jam Recordings, and was executive vice president of The Island Def Jam Music Group from 1999 to 2004. He served as executive vice president for Warner Music Group, working under his former Island Def Jam associate Lyor Cohen before stepping down as executive vice president of Warner Music Group to pursue entrepreneurial endeavors in September 2009.

In 2009, Liles launched New York City-based KWL Enterprises. In 2012, he co-founded 300 Entertainment with Lyor Cohen, Roger Gold and Todd Moscowitz. On September 17, 2024, Liles announced that he is stepping down at CEO of 300 Entertainment.

== Philanthropy ==
Liles' philanthropic activity has included serving as co-chair for the New Yorkers For Children Gala and his creation and ongoing participation in the Kevin Liles for a Better Baltimore Foundation.

== Personal life ==
Liles is married to Erika Liles. He and Erika have two daughters together.

In February 2025, a former Def Jam employee filed a lawsuit against Liles, alleging that he had sexually harassed and assaulted her while she was an executive assistant to the general manager at Def Jam. In the lawsuit, the former employee alleges that Liles had made "derogatory and degrading comments based on her gender regarding her body and appearance" starting soon after she began working at Def Jam around 1999 and escalating afterwards, with Liles pushing his body against her breasts and grabbing her behind up until 2002, when he allegedly made unwanted sexual advances toward the employee and later forcing himself on top of her and raping her despite continued protests.
