= Rob Pilatus =

German singer (1964/1965–1998)

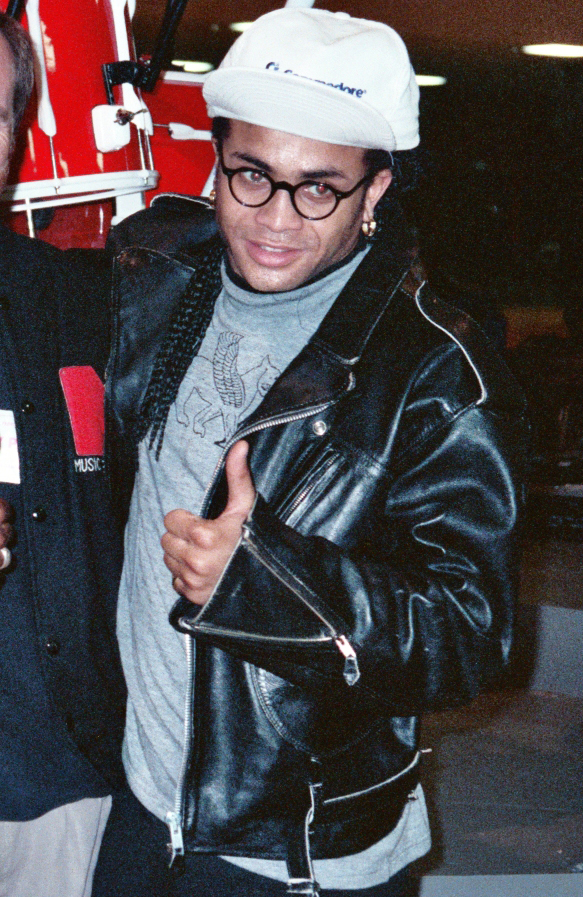
- Pilatus at the 1990 Grammy Awards rehearsal

Background information
- Born: Robert Pilatus; 8 June 1964 or 1965; Munich, West Germany
- Died: 3 April 1998 (aged 32 or 33) Friedrichsdorf, Germany
- Genres: Pop; dance; R&B; hip hop; funk
- Occupations: Singer; dancer; model; rapper
- Years active: 1988–1998
- Labels: Arista; BMG; Hansa; Taj

Robert Pilatus (8 June 1964 or 1965 – 3 April 1998) was a German singer, dancer, and model. He was a member of the pop music duo Milli Vanilli with Fab Morvan.

== Biography ==
=== Early life ===
Pilatus was born in Munich, West Germany, on 8 June 1964 or 1965. Sources differ on the year of his birth, with obituaries variously describing him as 32 or 33 years old at the time of his death in 1998. His father was an African-American serviceman and his mother was a German dancer. He spent his first four years in a Bavarian orphanage in Oberammergau before he was adopted by a Munich family. He stated he was bullied as a child in Germany, being called "Kunta Kinte" (the African hero in the film Roots) by his classmates. After leaving his adoptive home as a teen, Pilatus worked as a model and breakdancer, and appeared as a backing singer with the group Wind at the 1987 Eurovision Song Contest in Brussels. (The band finished in second place.) He met Fab Morvan on the dance scene in Munich in 1988, and after working as models, they formed a short-lived group "Empire Bizarre" which consisted of three members, Pilatus, Morvan, and Charliene, who released one single "Dansez" in 1988 and was performing locally with all members dancing and Rob singing lead while playing bass guitar.

=== Milli Vanilli ===
Pilatus and Morvan both continued moving into music and were subsequently noticed by German music producer Frank Farian, who signed them to be part of a musical act. They signed contracts with Farian without taking legal advice. After a trip to Turkey, where the duo reportedly took part of their name from a local advertising slogan, Milli Vanilli was born. Pilatus and Morvan were surprised to learn from Farian that they would not be singing on their records. They initially refused, but were unable to pay back the advance they had received, which they had used to change and promote their images by investing in clothes and their trademark hair extensions. They decided to continue with the agreement for a short time until they had made enough money to pay back the advance. This meant that they were to be only the public faces for songs that had been pre-recorded with singers Charles Shaw, John Davis, and Brad Howell, who Farian thought were vocally talented but lacked marketable images. Farian had a history of acts, such as Boney M, in which most of the actual singers (including Farian himself) were replaced by other performers on stage.

The first Milli Vanilli platinum album, Girl You Know It's True, became a worldwide hit. It produced five hit singles, including three number 1 hits: "Girl You Know It’s True", "Baby Don't Forget My Number" and "Blame It On The Rain". Milli Vanilli won the Grammy Award for Best New Artist on 21 February 1990.

Milli Vanilli quickly rose to fame and fortune, making it difficult for Pilatus and Morvan to withdraw from their agreement with Farian. Their attractiveness and appealing dance performances added to their huge on-stage success. After several years, Pilatus and Morvan became the subject of rumours of onstage lip-synching. Charles Shaw, one of their recordings' actual vocalists, told the media the truth, but retracted his statement when Farian paid him $150,000.

When Pilatus and Morvan pressured Farian to let them sing on their next album, Farian confessed to reporters on 15 November 1990 that the duo had not sung on the recordings. Milli Vanilli's Grammy Award was withdrawn four days later. Pilatus and Morvan said in an interview that they did the moral thing by initiating the withdrawal of the Grammy Award themselves. A United States court ruling allowed anyone who had bought the album to receive a refund.

Farian later attempted a comeback for the duo, but it was unsuccessful. Pilatus and Morvan decided to spend time apart to get their lives back on track. Months after the media backlash, they appeared in a commercial for Carefree Sugarless [chewing] Gum, where they jokingly lip-synched to an opera recording.

In 1992, Pilatus and Morvan signed with a new label, Taj, and released Rob & Fab, an album featuring their own voices, but it sold only 2,000 copies due to its limited release. The label went bankrupt shortly thereafter.

=== Later years ===
After Milli Vanilli attempted a comeback, Morvan and Pilatus spent time apart. In 1996, Pilatus was sentenced to three months in prison and six months in drug rehabilitation in Los Angeles for assault, vandalism and attempted robbery. He stayed in rehabilitation centres up to a dozen times, in the US and later in Germany.

=== Death ===
On 3 April 1998, on the eve of a promotional tour for a new Milli Vanilli album, Back and in Attack, featuring Pilatus and Morvan on lead vocals, Pilatus was found dead from an alcohol and prescription drug overdose in a hotel room at Friedrichsdorf, near Frankfurt. His death was ruled accidental. The album has never been released.

Pilatus is buried in the Munich Waldfriedhof.

== Discography ==
=== Rob and Fab ===
- Rob & Fab (1993)

== Film ==
German-Austrian film director Simon Verhoeven directed and wrote the 2023 Milli Vanilli biopic Girl You Know It's True, which was filmed in Munich, Berlin, Cape Town, and Los Angeles. The film was produced by Wiedemann & Berg Film, with Leonine as the theatrical distributor. The movie stars Tijan Njie and Elan Ben Ali as Rob Pilatus and Fab Morvan as well as Matthias Schweighöfer as music producer Frank Farian. Associate producers are Jasmin Davis, daughter of the late John Davis, and Brad Howell, the true voices behind Milli Vanilli. Carmen Pilatus, sister of the late Rob Pilatus, Milli Vanilli's former assistant Todd Headlee, and Ingrid Segieth aka Milli, are also attached as associate producers.

Previous attempts to produce a film about Milli Vanilli all had failed; on 14 February 2007, it was announced that Universal Pictures was developing a film based on the true story of Milli Vanilli's rise and fall in the music industry. Jeff Nathanson, a screenwriter known for Catch Me If You Can, was to write and direct the film. Morvan was supposed to serve as a consultant, providing his and Pilatus's point of view. However, the project was never completed. In 2011 German director Florian Gallenberger declared that he was reviving the project and would be rewriting the script, which also didn't eventually happen. Director Brett Ratner attempted to make his version of a Milli Vanilli biopic, but the project was eventually cancelled in 2021 after numerous Time's Up sexual harassment allegations against Ratner became public.
