= Brad Howell =

American keyboardist, pianist and singer

- Genres: Dance, pop, funk
- Occupations: Composer, musician, singer, drummer
- Years active: 1968–2003
- Label: Arista Records

Brad Howell is an American keyboardist, pianist, composer and singer, known as the singer who provided the vocals for German band Chilly and the actual vocals lip-synced by Rob Pilatus for the musical duo Milli Vanilli.

== Career ==
Howell was invited by RnB legend Wilson Pickett to join for his European Tour while the two met in his hometown of Washington, DC.

When Howell became a keyboardist and pianist, he appeared on chat shows and other programs featuring music. During one of these appearances, he came to the attention of producer Frank Farian, who wanted him to provide the vocals that would later be attributed to the duo Milli Vanilli. Howell did this work on all of the duo's albums until the truth became public, leading to a worldwide scandal. Subsequently, Farian decided to form a band using all of the vocalists who did the singing for the act, which he called The Real Milli Vanilli. However, they only released one album called The Moment of Truth and released four unsuccessful singles. They fared better on German charts, where the most successful was "Keep on Running", which peaked at no. 4. The Real Milli Vanilli appeared on many talk shows as performers, one award-winning ceremony in Germany and toured in America. Howell continued to play piano and keyboard after The Real Milli Vanilli.

== Albums ==
Chilly:

- For Your Love (1978)
- Come to L.A. (1979)
- Showbiz (1980)
- Secret Lies (1982)

Milli Vanilli:

- Girl You Know It's True (1988)
- All or Nothing (1988)

The Real Milli Vanilli:

- The Moment of Truth (1991)
