= Girl You Know It's True (song) =

1988 single by Milli Vanilli

Single by Milli Vanilli

from the album All or Nothing and Girl You Know It's True
- B-side: "Magic Touch"
- Released: 27 June 1988
- Recorded: 1988
- Genre: Dance
- Length: 4:14 (album version); 3:58 (single version)
- Label: Hansa
- Songwriters: Bill Pettaway, Jr.; Sean Spencer; Kevin Lyles; Rodney Holloman; Ky Adeyemo
- Producer: Frank Farian

Milli Vanilli singles chronology
| "Girl You Know It's True" (1988) | "Baby Don't Forget My Number" (1988) |

Music video
- "Girl You Know It's True" on YouTube

"Girl You Know It's True" is a song by Maryland-based group Numarx, later popularised by German dance-pop group Milli Vanilli. Released as the lead single from the latter's European debut album, All or Nothing (1988), and their American debut album, Girl You Know It's True (1989), the song peaked at number one on the German Singles Chart, number two in the United States and number three in the United Kingdom, becoming one of Milli Vanilli's most successful singles. The song samples "Ashley's Roachclip" by the Soul Searchers. It would become infamous for live performance skipping on tape.

== Background ==
The song was written by Bill Pettaway Jr., Sean "DJ Spen" Spencer, Kevin Liles, Rodney "Kool Rod" Holloman (often misspelled "Hollaman" on single/album credits) and Ky Adeyemo, most of whom were members of the Baltimore, Maryland-based group Numarx, who first recorded the song.

Started by DJ Spen and featuring Kool Rod as the original MC, Numarx was a collective of local DJs who formed a "crew" in the early 1980s, originally consisting of four members. The group expanded to five in the mid-1980s with the addition of Liles as fellow MC. In 1987, having already released material during their early years, Numarx released the single "Rhymes So Def", which received national airplay at the time. The follow-up single to this minor hit was "Girl You Know It's True".

The idea for the song began when the group wrote a rap to a track composed by local musician/songwriter Bill Pettaway. Liles and Holloman wrote the words and Spencer made the beat. The song was recorded at Studio Records in Oxon Hill, Maryland - just outside of Washington, DC. Bill Pettaway, an Annapolis resident was working as a gas station attendant at the time also wrote songs and played guitar on the side. Pettaway, along with Numarx members Spencer, Liles, and Holloman continued to craft the tune. In addition, then-current Starpoint member Kayode "Ky" Adeyemo joined in, co-writing and co-producing the song with Pettaway. Adeyemo played keyboards and wrote the infectious "Ooh Ooh Ooh" hook for the song. Kevin Liles and Kool Rod are the lead vocalists rhyming on the record with Spencer providing some background vocals. However, the most prominent vocalist on the hook and backing vocals of the song is Charles "Ooh Oh Ooh" Christopher. Charles was friends with Pettaway, Adeyemo, and Starpoint keyboardist George Phillips and became the voice that everyone was singing along with. Although the song did not match the success of "Rhymes So Def" in America, "Girl You Know It's True" did connect with audiences on the other side of the Atlantic, becoming a popular hit in the German clubs. It was here that Milli Vanilli producer Frank Farian likely first heard the tune.

Meanwhile, Numarx would later include their version of "Girl You Know It's True" on their lone album, Our Time Has Come, released in 1988. The group formed a small independent record label, the following year, called Marx Brothers Records releasing several regional hits including "Do It Good", which was later remixed by Basement Boys and became a dance music hit. The group disbanded in the early 90s. DJ Spen went on to become an on-air radio personality in Baltimore. He later joined the Baltimore-based powerhouse dance music production outfit Basement Boys that produced hit dance music numbers for Michael Jackson, Crystal Waters, Toni Braxton, and Ultra Naté. He is now a DJ that runs an independent dance music label and production company, Quantize Recordings. After working as a local music promoter on the east coast, Liles went on to work for Def Jam Recordings, where he eventually worked his way to the role of President. He is currently CEO of 300 Entertainment in New York, which produces and manages some of the biggest names in R&B and hip hop music. Pettaway was later credited with discovering multi-platinum-selling singer Toni Braxton and has gone on to prominence as a session guitarist for Timbaland and other artists.

== Chart performance ==
"Girl You Know It's True" was a big success in the United States, peaking at No. 2 on the Billboard Hot 100 for the week ending 1 April 1989. It became the first of five top 5 singles for Milli Vanilli and spent a total of 26 weeks on the chart.

== Critical reception ==
American magazine Cash Box called the song "an average quasi-rap that goes nowhere."

== Remixes ==
The New York City subway remix of the song features samples from several pop and R&B artists who were popular in the '80s. These include Flavor Flav's signature "Yeah, boyyy" phrase and a piece from Dennis Edwards' 1984 song "Don't Look Any Further".

== Track listings ==
- 12-inch maxi – Australia, New Zealand, UK
1. "Girl You Know It's True" (NY Subway mix) – 8:07
2. "Girl You Know It's True" (Balearic mix) – 6:24
3. "Magic Touch" – 3:47
- 12-inch maxi – Canada, U.S.
1. "Girl You Know It's True" (Super Club mix) – 8:33
2. "Girl You Know It's True" (G Spot remix beats) – 6:22
3. "Girl You Know It's True" (Single version) – 3:48
4. "Girl You Know It's True" (NYC Subway mix) – 8:07
5. "Magic Touch" — 3:47
- 12-inch maxi – Germany, UK
1. "Girl You Know It's True" (Super Club mix) – 8:49
2. "Girl You Know It's True" (Radio mix) – 4:14
3. "Magic Touch" – 3:47
- 7-inch single
1. "Girl You Know It's True" – 4:14
2. "Magic Touch" – 3:47
- 7-inch single – UK 2nd issue, Sweden
1. "Girl You Know It's True" (Summer '88 mix) – 4:12
2. "Magic Touch" – 3:47
- CD maxi-single – Germany
1. "Girl You Know It's True" (NY Subway mix) – 8:15 (8:12)
2. "Girl You Know It's True" (G Spot remix beats) – 6:15 (6:27)
3. "Girl You Know It's True" (Super Club mix) – 7:25 (6:31)

Track 3: Due to the 20 minute single limit the track is faded out early at 6:30, the full version is ~8:47.

== Charts ==
=== Weekly charts ===
| Chart (1988–1989) | Peak position |
|---|---|
| Australia (ARIA) | 88 |
| Austria (Ö3 Austria Top 40) | 1 |
| Belgium (Ultratop 50 Flanders) | 4 |
| Canada Retail Singles (The Record) | 1 |
| Canada Top Singles (RPM) | 3 |
| Canada Dance/Urban (RPM) | 2 |
| Europe (Eurochart Hot 100) | 1 |
| Finland (Suomen virallinen lista) | 3 |
| France (SNEP) | 2 |
| Greece (IFPI) | 1 |
| Iceland (Íslenski Listinn Topp 10) | 5 |
| Ireland (IRMA) | 3 |
| Italy Airplay (Music & Media) | 2 |
| Netherlands (Dutch Top 40) | 4 |
| Netherlands (Single Top 100) | 2 |
| New Zealand (Recorded Music NZ) | 13 |
| Norway (VG-lista) | 2 |
| Spain (AFYVE) | 1 |
| Sweden (Sverigetopplistan) | 2 |
| Switzerland (Schweizer Hitparade) | 2 |
| UK Singles (Official Charts) | 3 |
| US Billboard Hot 100 | 2 |
| US Dance Club Songs (Billboard) | 3 |
| US Dance Singles Sales (Billboard) | 1 |
| US Hot R&B/Hip-Hop Songs (Billboard) | 3 |
| US Hot Rap Songs (Billboard) | 2 |
| West Germany (GfK) | 1 |

=== Year-end charts ===
| Chart (1988) | Position |
|---|---|
| Austria (Ö3 Austria Top 40) | 5 |
| Belgium (Ultratop) | 51 |
| Europe (Eurochart Hot 100) | 7 |
| Netherlands (Dutch Top 40) | 24 |
| Netherlands (Single Top 100) | 16 |
| Switzerland (Schweizer Hitparade) | 14 |
| UK Singles (OCC) | 40 |
| West Germany (Media Control) | 1 |

| Chart (1989) | Position |
|---|---|
| Canada Top Singles (RPM) | 54 |
| Canada Dance/Urban (RPM) | 6 |
| New Zealand (RIANZ) | 20 |
| US Billboard Hot 100 | 8 |
| US 12-inch Single Sales (Billboard) | 11 |
| US Dance Club Play (Billboard) | 33 |
| US Hot Black Singles (Billboard) | 21 |
| US Hot Rap Singles (Billboard) | 19 |

== Certifications ==
Certifications and sales for "Girl You Know It's True"
| Region | Certification | Certified units/sales |
|---|---|---|
| Australia (ARIA) | Gold | 35,000^{^} |
| Canada (Music Canada) | Gold | 50,000^{^} |
| France (SNEP) | Silver | 250,000^{*} |
| Germany (BVMI) | Gold | 250,000^{^} |
| New Zealand (RMNZ) | Platinum | 10,000^{*} |
| Sweden (GLF) | Gold | 25,000^{^} |
| United Kingdom (BPI) | Silver | 250,000^{^} |
| United States (RIAA) | Platinum | 1,000,000^{^} |
^{*} Sales figures based on certification alone.^{^} Shipments figures based on certification alone.

== Other versions ==
- The song was covered by Centory featuring Trey D. in 1996 which reached No. 50 on the official German singles chart, and remaining on the chart for 10 weeks.
- A version was recorded by Keith Duffy and Shane Lynch (of Boyzone) as Keith 'N' Shane in 2000, with the rapped verses taking verbal shots at rival boybands Westlife and 5ive. It reached No. 36 on the UK Singles Chart.
- In 2001, Oli P. and Jan van der Toorn recorded a cover with an additional German-language rap section performed by van der Toorn. The release charted at No. 17 on the official German singles chart staying for 10 weeks. It also charted on the Ö3 Austria Top 40 peaking at No. 40.
- In 2007, a rap version was made by German R&B duo Lemon Ice made up of Gunther Göbbel (Geeno) and Jay Low. It reached No. 26 on the German singles chart.
- In 2009, Danish artist Burhan G had a hit with the Danish language single "Jeg vil ha' dig for mig selv" that largely samples "Girl You Know It's True". Taken from his self-titled album Burhan G, "Jeg vil ha' dig for mig selv" (translated as "I want you for myself") reached No. 8 on Tracklisten, the official Danish singles chart.

== In popular culture ==
In 2018, the song was featured in an advert for Fridge Raiders.

== See also ==
- List of European number-one hits of 1988
- List of number-one hits of 1988 (Germany)
