= Frank Farian =

German record producer and singer (1941–2024)

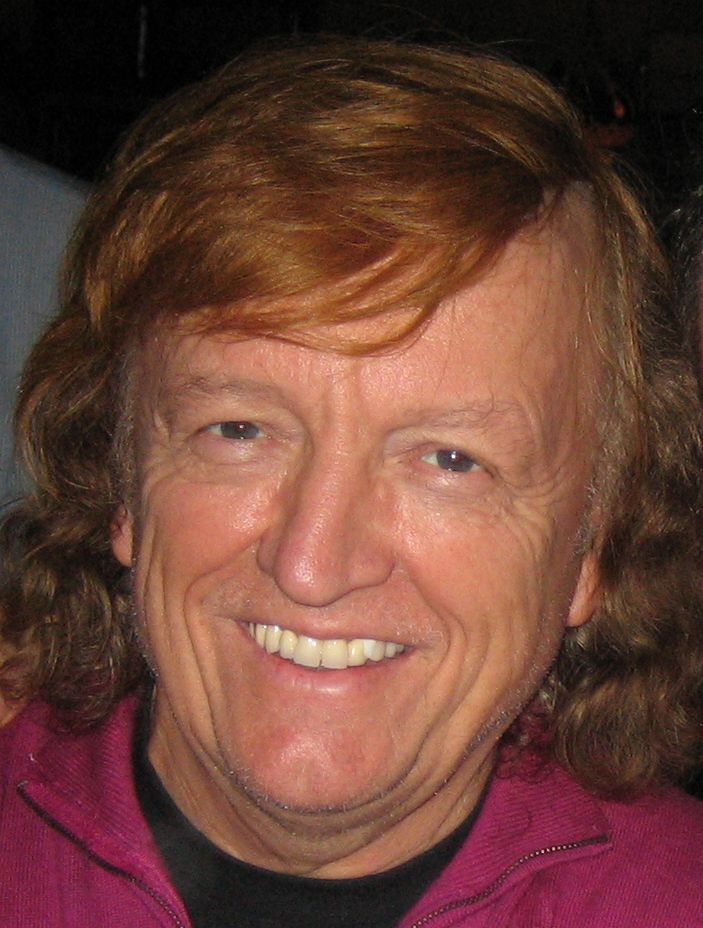
- Farian in 2008

Background information
- Also known as: Zambi; G. Mart; FMP
- Born: Franz Reuther; 18 July 1941; Kirn, Germany
- Died: 23 January 2024 (aged 82) Miami, Florida, U.S.
- Occupations: Record producer, singer
- Years active: 1958–2024

Franz Reuther (18 July 1941 – 23 January 2024), known professionally as Frank Farian, was a German record producer and singer who founded the 1970s disco-pop group Boney M., and the pop bands No Mercy and Milli Vanilli. He frequently created vocal groups in which the publicised members merely lip-synced to songs sung by himself and/or session performers. Farian owned the record label MCI and several subsidiaries.

== Early life ==
Farian was born in Kirn, Germany, on 18 July 1941. He and two siblings were raised by his mother, because his father was killed in World War II before his birth. He trained as a cook before discovering rock and roll, renaming himself Frank Farian, and forming a band called Frankie Boys Schatten. In 1964, they released their first single, "Shouting Ghost", which was a failure.

== Career ==
In April 1967, Farian released a cover of Otis Redding's "Mr. Pitiful" under the name 'Frankie Farian'. After signing a recording contract as a solo performer, he moved into pop and appeared on the TV programme Hitparade. In 1976, Farian's German-language cover of Austin Roberts' "Rocky" stayed at No. 1 in the German charts for four weeks. His 1973 single "Was kann schöner sein?" (a German-language cover of the Lynsey de Paul/Ron Roker song "When You've Gotta Go") was listed as one of the top 100 schlager songs of all time by German magazine Popkultur.

Working with composers Hans-Ulrich Weigel, Stefan Klinkhammer, and Roland Kaiser, he co-wrote and produced the song "Skateboard" for Copains which was released in 1977. It was a hit in both Germany and Sweden where it peaked at no. 38 and no. 17 respectively. It was also a hit for German singer Benny who got the song to no. 40 in the German charts. It was covered by Norwegian band Kjell Vidars and by the Swedish band Sten & Stanley. Years later it would be covered by German skate-punk band, Disaster Area.

=== Boney M. ===
In late 1974, he recorded "Baby Do You Wanna Bump" (a remake of Prince Buster's song "Al Capone" from 1967), first released in 1975 as a single and on the 1976 album Take the Heat off Me under the pseudonym Boney M. He recruited a line-up which included vocalists Liz Mitchell and Marcia Barrett along with a front-man, Bobby Farrell, and a female dancer, Maizie Williams. Under the name Boney M., he achieved his biggest success in Europe as well as world-wide with songs including "Daddy Cool", "Rivers of Babylon", "Rasputin", "Nightflight to Venus", and a remake of "Mary's Boy Child". As later with the purported vocalists of Milli Vanilli, Farrell did not actually sing; he lip-synced to Farian's own vocals.

=== Far Corporation ===
Farian also started the supergroup Far Corporation (named after the first syllable of his last name), which featured Steve Lukather, David Paich, Bobby Kimball, Simon Phillips (all from Toto fame), and Robin McAuley. Far Corporation were the first act to chart with a cover version of Led Zeppelin's "Stairway to Heaven"; their cover was a top 10 hit in the UK Singles Chart, reaching number 8 in October 1985.

=== Meat Loaf ===
In 1986, Farian produced and mixed the Meat Loaf album Blind Before I Stop. He also sang backing vocals on the album's lead single, "Rock 'n' Roll Mercenaries", which was credited to Meat Loaf featuring John Parr.

=== Milli Vanilli ===
In 1988, Farian began producing Milli Vanilli. He assembled a group of session musicians and fronted it with physically attractive dancers Robert Pilatus and Fabrice Morvan. During a 1989 performance a backing track error first revealed the singers had been lip-syncing. On 14 November 1990, Farian confirmed that others had sung on the albums. Milli Vanilli's 1990 Grammy Award for Best New Artist was revoked, and at least 26 lawsuits were filed in the United States under U.S. consumer fraud protection laws.

=== La Bouche, Le Click, Eruption, No Mercy ===
Following the Milli Vanilli controversy, Farian developed similar Eurodance groups La Bouche and Le Click. He also produced the 1997 version of "Tic, Tic Tac" by Chilli Feat. Carrapicho.

Some other groups and solo acts Farian was involved with are Eruption (whom he managed in 1977), singer Precious Wilson, and Latin pop band No Mercy, which was based in Germany.

=== Daddy Cool musical ===
On 15 August 2006, the musical Daddy Cool opened at the Shaftesbury Theatre in London's West End, featuring Michelle Collins, Michael Harvey, Javine Hylton, and singer/songwriter Darvina Plante. The £3 million show was produced by Farian and Robert Mackintosh. The story, written by Stephen Plaice with Amani Naphtali, is predominantly based on the songs of Boney M., but also has songs by Milli Vanilli, Eruption, La Bouche, and No Mercy. A second show opened on 23 April 2007 in Berlin, Germany, and toured in the Netherlands from August 2011 to February 2012, Spain (Palma de Mallorca) in July 2012, Switzerland from November 2015 to January 2016, and Germany in 2016.

=== Anti-Bohlen book ===
In 2004 Frank Farian wrote a book called Stupid dieser Bohlen: Die Wahrheit und Nichts als die Wahrheit über den Pop-Hochstapler. In the book he tried to expose Dieter Bohlen songwriter and producer most known for Modern Talking. In the book he criticized the music of Bohlen and his comments towards many people. He also claimed that it was unrighteous that Bohlen was registered to the GVL as a singer and musician, because he was not a singer and a musician. He claimed that Peter Weihe played the guitar for Modern Talking. Peter Weihe performed on guitar for the Milli Vanilli album All or Nothing which Farian produced. Farian and Bohlen also had known each other personally a long time before the book was published. The book was not a commercial success.

=== Other activities ===
In 2006, Farian was credited as co-writing the song "Doin' Fine" with British producers Nathan Thomas and Carl M. Cox. (Other writers involved in the song were Chris Rudall, Baz Qureshi, Peter Wilson, Chris Richards, and George Reyam). Described as paying tribute to the sound of Boney M., the song was essentially a new composition featuring the string arrangement from Boney M.'s 1976 number one hit "Daddy Cool". It was recorded by Australian pop singer Peter Wilson. It was initially released in the UK on 16 April 2007 in its extended format, entitled "Daddy's Cool 12" Mix", and reached number one on the EuroDanceHits EuroNRG Top 40 in May 2007. The original version of "Doin' Fine" was featured on Peter Wilson's debut album, Follow Me, released in the UK on 8 October 2007. It was also recorded in 2008 by Amanda Lear.

== Personal life ==
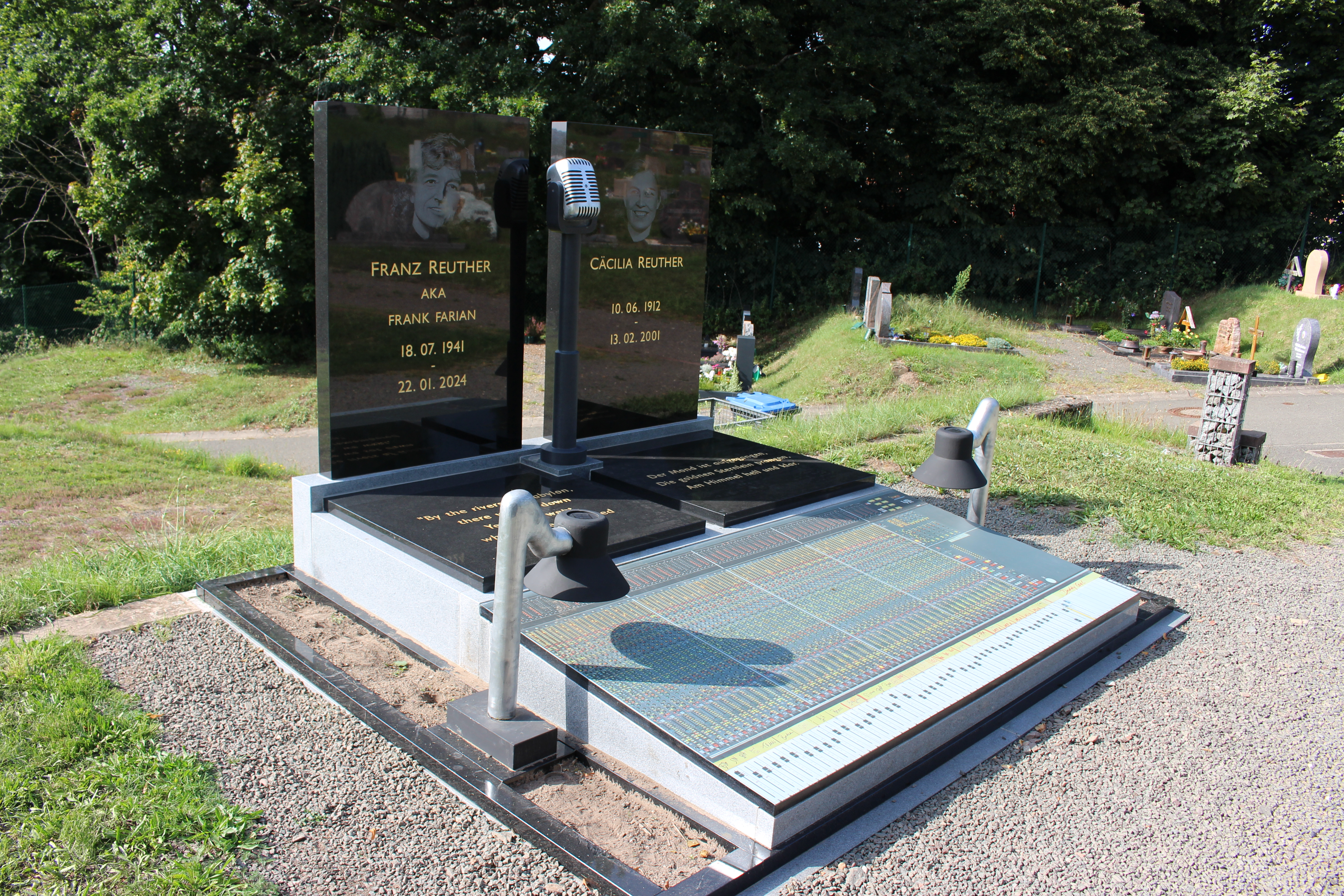
Farian's grave in the Gänsberg cemetery in Spiesen-Elversberg, Saarland, Germany

Later in life, Farian resided in Miami, Florida, United States. He had three daughters and a son with his former common-law wife, Chinya Onyewenjo. His daughter Yanina sang with him in 2021 on a cover of "Cherish" by Kool & the Gang. In 2022, he announced that his life had been saved by a surgery to replace an ailing heart valve with tissue from a pig's organ. Although the surgery was successful, Farian's health declined and he used a wheelchair and a breathing apparatus due to pulmonary issues. He had also lost a lot of weight.

Farian died in Miami on 23 January 2024 at the age of 82.

== In films ==
In 2023, Farian was portrayed by Matthias Schweighöfer in the film Girl You Know It's True.

On 3 September 2024, it was announced that a documentary series covering the life and career of Farian by Australian film producer Kaine Harling was in pre-production.

== Discography ==
=== Studio albums ===
- So ein Tag (1971)
- So muß Liebe sein (1973)
- Rocky (1976)
- Division One (1985)
- Solitude (1994)

=== Compilation albums ===
- Star Discothek (1978)
- The Hit Man – The Best of 25 Years (1994)
- The Hit Collection – The Best of 25 Years (1994)
- The Hit Man II (2000)
- Summer Hits (2001)
- Dieter Thomas Heck präsentiert: 40 Jahre ZDF Hitparade (2009)
- Produced by Frank Farian (2009)

=== Singles ===
- "Shouting Ghost" (1964)
- "Yakety Yak" (1964)
- "Under the Boardwalk" (1965)
- "Mr. Pitiful" (1967)
- "Gipsy" (1968)
- "Dana My Love" (1968)
- "Ein Kissen voller Träume" (1969)
- "Speedy Jack" (1970)
- "Du bist wunderbar" (1971)
- "Morgens, mittags, abends – Barbara" (1971)
- "So ein Tag" (1971)
- "Gold in Acapulco" (1972)
- "Leg den Kopf an meine Schulter" (1972)
- "Was kann schöner sein" (1973)
- "So muß Liebe sein" (1973)
- "Wunderbar" (1973)
- "Bleib bei mir" (1974)
- "An mir soll es nicht liegen" (1974)
- "Atlantica" (1975)
- "My Decision" (1975)
- "Cara mia bleib" (1975)
- "Rocky" (1976)
- "Spring über deinen Schatten, Tommy" (1976)
- "Sie war erst 17 (und neu in der Stadt)" (1977)
- "Mother and Child Reunion" (1985)
- "Stairway to Heaven" (1985)
- "Fire and Water" (1986)
- "You Are the Woman" (1986)
- "One By One" (1987)
- "Sebastian" (1987)
- "Rikki Don't Lose That Number" (1994)
- "Rainy Days" (1994)

=== Albums produced (selection) ===
Boney M.

- Take the Heat off Me (No. 2 Germany, No. 1 Sweden)
- Love for Sale (No. 1 Germany, No. 1 Sweden, No. 2 Netherlands)
- Nightflight to Venus (No. 1 UK, No. 1 Germany, No. 1 Netherlands)
- Oceans of Fantasy (No. 1 UK, No. 1 Germany, No. 3 Netherlands)
- The Magic of Boney M. – 20 Golden Hits (No. 1 UK, No. 2 Germany, No. 2 New Zealand)
- Gold – 20 Super Hits (No. 2 Netherlands, No. 2 New Zealand)

Gilla

- Help! Help! (1977)

Meat Loaf

- Blind Before I Stop (1986) (No. 28 UK, No. 21 Switzerland, No. 51 Germany)

Milli Vanilli

- All or Nothing (1988) (No. 4 Germany, No. 1 Australia, No. 1 New Zealand)
- Girl You Know It's True (1989) (No. 1 USA, No. 1 Canada)

The Real Milli Vanilli

- The Moment of Truth (The Real Milli Vanilli album) (1991)

La Bouche

- Sweet Dreams (1995) (No. 2 Finland, No. 2 Switzerland, No. 10 Australia)

No Mercy

- My Promise (1996) (No. 4 Australia, No. 3 Netherlands)

Eruption

- Eruption, also released as I Can't Stand the Rain (1977)
- Leave a Light (1979)

Precious Wilson

- On the Race Track (1980)
- All Coloured in Love (1982)
- Funky Fingers (1983)
