= List of certified hip-hop albums in Germany =

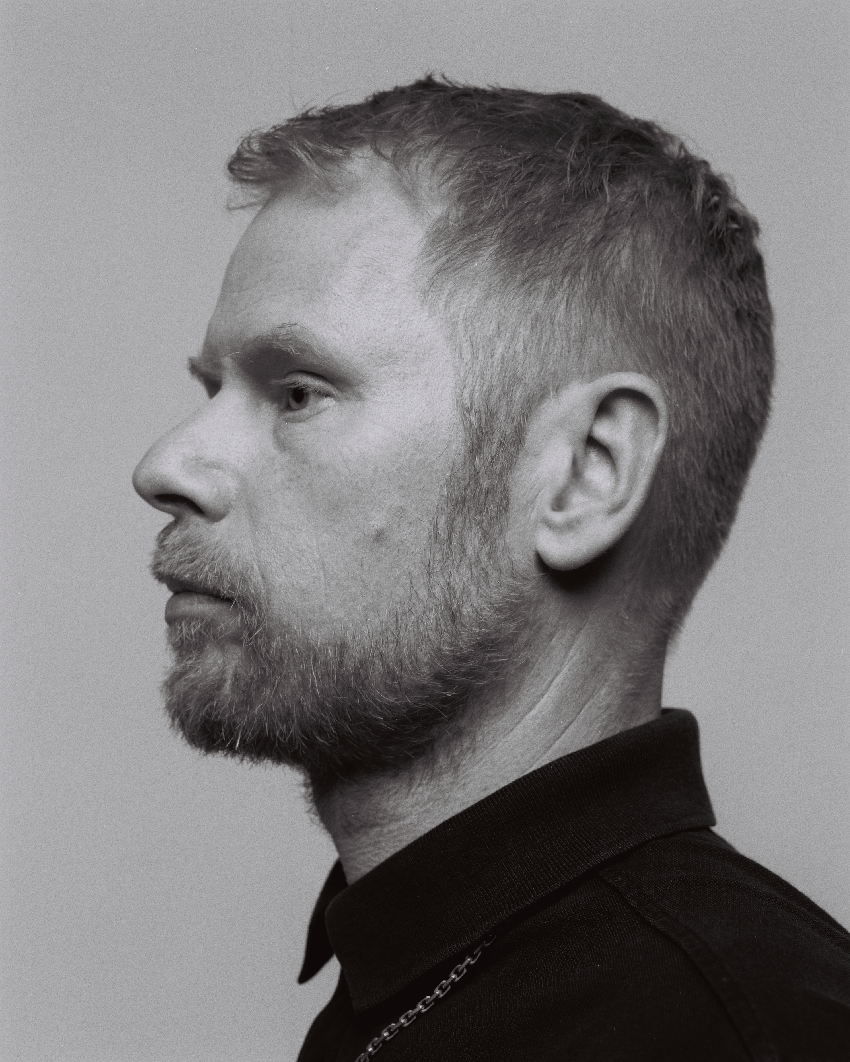
Peter Foxs first studio album Stadtaffe was certified with thirteen times gold, equivalent to 1,3 million units.

Since the early 1990s, more than 130 rap albums have been certified in Germany in accordance with the certification levels set up by the Bundesverband Musikindustrie (BVMI). The BVMI was founded in 1958 and certifications were introduced on 1 January 1975.

== Certification levels ==
Certification	till 24 September 1999	till 31. December 2002	till 31 December 2012	since 1 January 2013
Gold	250,000	150,000	100,000	100,000
Platinum	500,000	300,000	200,000	200,000
3× Gold	750,000	450,000	300,000	300,000
2× Platinum	1,000,000	600,000	400,000	400,000
…	…	…	…	…
Diamond	–	–	–	750,000

== By Units ==
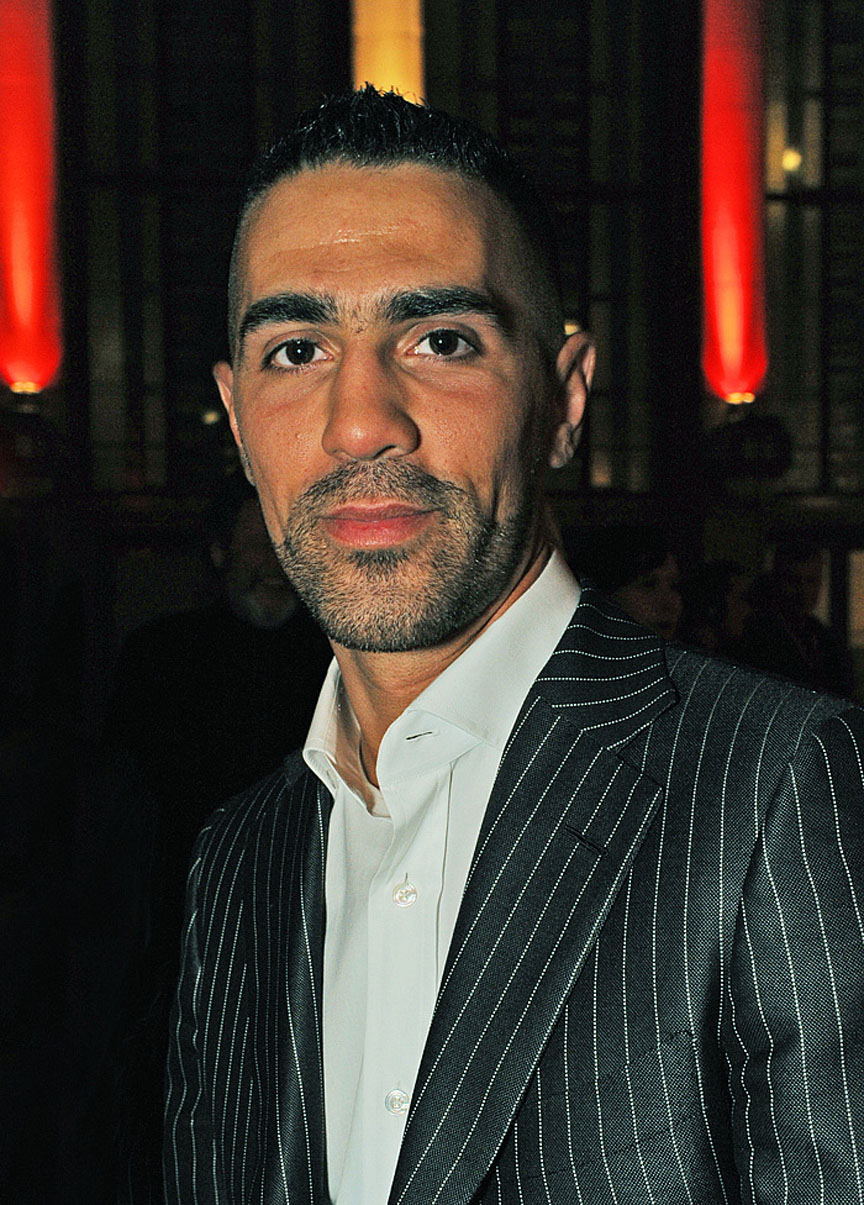
Eleven of Bushidos albums have been certified in Germany

Album	Artist(s)	Certification	Released	Certified	Units	Ref.
Stadtaffe	Peter Fox	13 × Gold	2008	2016	1,300,000	
Tic Tac Toe	Tic Tac Toe	2 × Platinum	1996	1997	1,000,000	
Klappe die 2te	Tic Tac Toe	2 × Platinum	1997	1997	1,000,000	
4 gewinnt	Die Fantastischen Vier	3 × Gold	1992	1998	750,000	
The Score	Fugees	3 × Gold	1996	1996	750,000	
The Marshall Mathers LP	Eminem	2 × Platin	2000	2001	600,000	
The Eminem Show	Eminem	2 × Platin	2002	2003	600,000	
Lauschgift	Die Fantastischen Vier	1 × Platin	1995	1995	500,000	
Raop	Cro	5 × Gold	2012	2013	500,000	
The E.N.D.	The Black Eyed Peas	2 × Platinum	2009	2010	400,000	
MTV Unplugged	The Black Eyed Peas	1 × Platinum	2000	2003	300,000	
Dutty Rock	Sean Paul	1 × Platinum	2003	2004	300,000	
Next!	Seeed	3 × Gold	2005	2014	300,000	
King	Kollegah	3 × Gold	2014	2016	300,000	
Melodie	Cro	3 × Gold	2014	2016	300,000	
Rekord	Die Fantastischen Vier	3 × Gold	2014	2015	300,000	
Please Hammer, Don't Hurt 'Em	MC Hammer	1 × Gold	1990	1991	250,000	
Die 4. Dimension	Die Fantastischen Vier	1 × Gold	1993	1993	250,000	
Direkt aus Rödelheim	Rödelheim Hartreim Projekt	1 × Gold	1994	2004	250,000	
Gangsta's Paradise	Coolio	1 × Gold	1995	1996	250,000	
Quadratur des Kreises	Freundeskreis	1 × Gold	1997	2017	250,000	
Die neue S-Klasse	Sabrina Setlur	1 × Gold	1997	1997	250,000	
Nana	Nana	1 × Gold	1997	1997	250,000	
Bambule	Absolute Beginner	1 × Gold	1998	2000	250,000	
Greatest Hits	2Pac	1 × Gold	1998	2000	250,000	
4:99	Die Fantastischen Vier	1 × Gold	1999	1999	250,000	
Esperanto	Freundeskreis	1 × Gold	1999	1999	250,000	
Music Monks	Seeed	1 × Platinum	2003	2009	200,000	
Elephunk	The Black Eyed Peas	1 × Platinum	2003	2004	200,000	
Viel	Die Fantastischen Vier	1 × Platinum	2004	2004	200,000	
Encore	Eminem	1 × Platinum	2004	2004	200,000	
Collision Course	Jay-Z and Linkin Park	1 × Platinum	2004	2005	200,000	
The Massacre	50 Cent	1 × Platinum	2005	2005	200,000	
Monkey Business	The Black Eyed Peas	1 × Platinum	2005	2006	200,000	
Mercedes-Dance	Jan Delay	1 × Platinum	2006	2008	200,000	
Von der Skyline zum Bordstein zurück	Bushido	1 × Platinum	2006	2007	200,000	
Live	Seeed	1 × Platinum	2006	2014	200,000	
Shock Value	Timbaland	1 × Platinum	2007	2007	200,000	
Fornika	Die Fantastischen Vier	1 × Platinum	2007	2008	200,000	
7	Bushido	1 × Platinum	2007	2008	200,000	
Culcha Candela	Culcha Candela	1 × Platinum	2007	2011	200,000	
Wir Kinder vom Bahnhof Soul	Jan Delay	1 × Platinum	2009	2010	200,000	
Schöne neue Welt	Culcha Candela	1 × Platinum	2009	2010	200,000	
Live aus Berlin	Peter Fox	1 × Platinum	2009	2014	200,000	
Für dich immer noch Fanta Sie	Die Fantastischen Vier	1 × Platinum	2010	2011	200,000	
Recovery	Eminem	1 × Platinum	2010	2010	200,000	
Das Beste	Culcha Candela	1 × Platinum	2010	2010	200,000	
XOXO	Casper	1 × Platinum	2011	2014	200,000	
Befehl von ganz unten	Deichkind	1 × Platinum	2012	2012	200,000	
Gespaltene Persönlichkeit	Xavas	1 × Platinum	2012	2012	200,000	
The Heist	Macklemore & Ryan Lewis	1 × Platinum	2012	2016	200,000	
Beste	Sido	1 × Platinum	2012	2018	200,000	
Triebwerke	Alligatoah	1 × Platinum	2013	2018	200,000	
Hinterland	Casper	1 × Platinum	2013	2014	200,000	
The Marshall Mathers LP 2	Eminem	1 × Platinum	2013	2014	200,000	
30-11-80	Sido	1 × Platinum	2013	2014	200,000	
MTV Unplugged Kahedi Radio Show	Max Herre	1 × Platinum	2013	2014	200,000	
Zum Glück in die Zukunft II	Marteria	1 × Platinum	2014	2015	200,000	
In Schwarz	Kraftklub	1 × Platinum	2014	2017	200,000	
Niveau weshalb warum	Deichkind	1 × Platinum	2015	2016	200,000	
MTV Unplugged: Cro	Deichkind	1 × Platinum	2015	2016	200,000	
Advanced Chemistry	Beginner	1 × Platinum	2016	2017	200,000	
Palmen aus Plastik	Bonez MC & RAF Camora	1 × Platinum	2016	2017	200,000	
