= Captain Fantastic =

Captain Fantastic may refer to:

- Captain Fantastic (TV series), a 1967 British TV series
- Captain Fantastic (film), a 2016 American comedy-drama
- Captain Fantastic and the Brown Dirt Cowboy, a 1975 album by Elton John
- Captain Fantastic (album), a 2018 album by Die Fantastischen Vier
- Sunil Chhetri (born 1984), an Indian footballer
