= DisJam =

disJam
- Origin: Hamburg, Germany
- Genres: Acid-jazz, jazz-funk
- Years active: 1991–present
- Labels: 5000 Records
- Members: Christoph Kähler; Sascha Panknin; Volker Kurnoth; Ralf Petter; Ole Janssen; Oliver Schumacher

disJam is an acid-jazz and jazz-funk band from Hamburg, Germany.

The band's members have included Christoph Kähler (drums, guitar and vocals), Sascha Panknin (bass guitar, guitar and keyboards), Volker Kurnoth (guitar and vocals), Ralf Petter (keyboards and vocals), Ole Janssen (saxophone) and Oliver Schumacher (percussion and keyboards). disJam was formed in the early 1990s and has been known in Germany, Switzerland and Austria since the mid-1990s; they have frequently been on tour with Die Fantastischen Vier, as well as performed on their albums Lauschgift and Live und Direkt.

== Discography ==
- Phuturing the Poetry of Lemn Sissay, Yo Mama Records, 1994.
- When It's Cold EP, Yo Mama Records, 1994.
- disJam, Instinct Records, 1995.
- Money, Yo Mama Records, 1997.
- Return of the Manchurian Candidate, Shadow Records, 1998.
- Hybrid Honey, 5000 Records, 1999.
- Completely Happy With It EP, 5000 Records, 1999.
- Hybrid Honey, Shadow Records, 2000.
