= Zusammen (song) =

Single by Die Fantastischen Vier

from the album Captain Fantastic
- Released: 23 March 2018
- Genre: Hip hop, pop
- Songwriter(s): Andreas Rieke, Michael B. Schmidt, Thomas Dürr, Michael DJ Beck, Thomas Burchia, Samy Sorge, Michael Kurth, Conrad Hensel, Florian Renner, Ricco Schoenebeck, Toni Oliver Schoenebeck
- Producer(s): DJ Thomilla, Conrad Hensel, Hitnapperz

Die Fantastischen Vier singles chronology
"Tunnel" (2018)	"Zusammen" (2018)

"Zusammen" ("Together") is a song by German hip hop group Die Fantastischen Vier featuring Clueso and a single from the Die Fantastischen Vier album Captain Fantastic. It peaked at number 2 on the German charts, at number 32 in Austria, and at number 35 in Switzerland. It was chosen as the official song for the 2018 FIFA World Cup by the German broadcaster Das Erste. It was played throughout the channel's coverage.

== Writing and production ==
The song was written by Andreas Rieke, Michael "Smudo" Schmidt, Thomas Dürr ("Thomas D"), Michael "Michi" Beck, Thomas Burchia, Samy Sorge, Michael Kurth, Conrad Hensel, Florian Renner, Ricco Schoenebeck, and Toni Oliver Schoenebeck. It was produced by DJ Thomilla, Conrad Hensel, and Hitnapperz.

== Music video ==
In the music video, the manager of the band, Bär Läsker, forces them to found a new group called "Fanta 5" because of the falling sales, in which Clueso is a new member. While the other band members are sceptical, Fanta 4 member Michi Beck rejects Clueso and is quarreling with him in some scenes of the video. In other scenes the two are reconciling and dancing together.

== Charts ==
=== Weekly charts ===
Chart (2018)	Peak position
Austria (Ö3 Austria Top 40)	32
Germany (GfK)	2
Switzerland (Schweizer Hitparade)	35

=== Year-end charts ===
Chart (2018)	Position
Germany (Official German Charts)	27

== Certifications ==
Region	Certification	Certified units/sales
Austria (IFPI Austria)	Gold	15,000^{‡}
Germany (BVMI)	Gold	200,000^{‡}
^{‡} Sales+streaming figures based on certification alone.
