= Koenneritz Bridge =

Koenneritz Bridge Könneritzbrücke
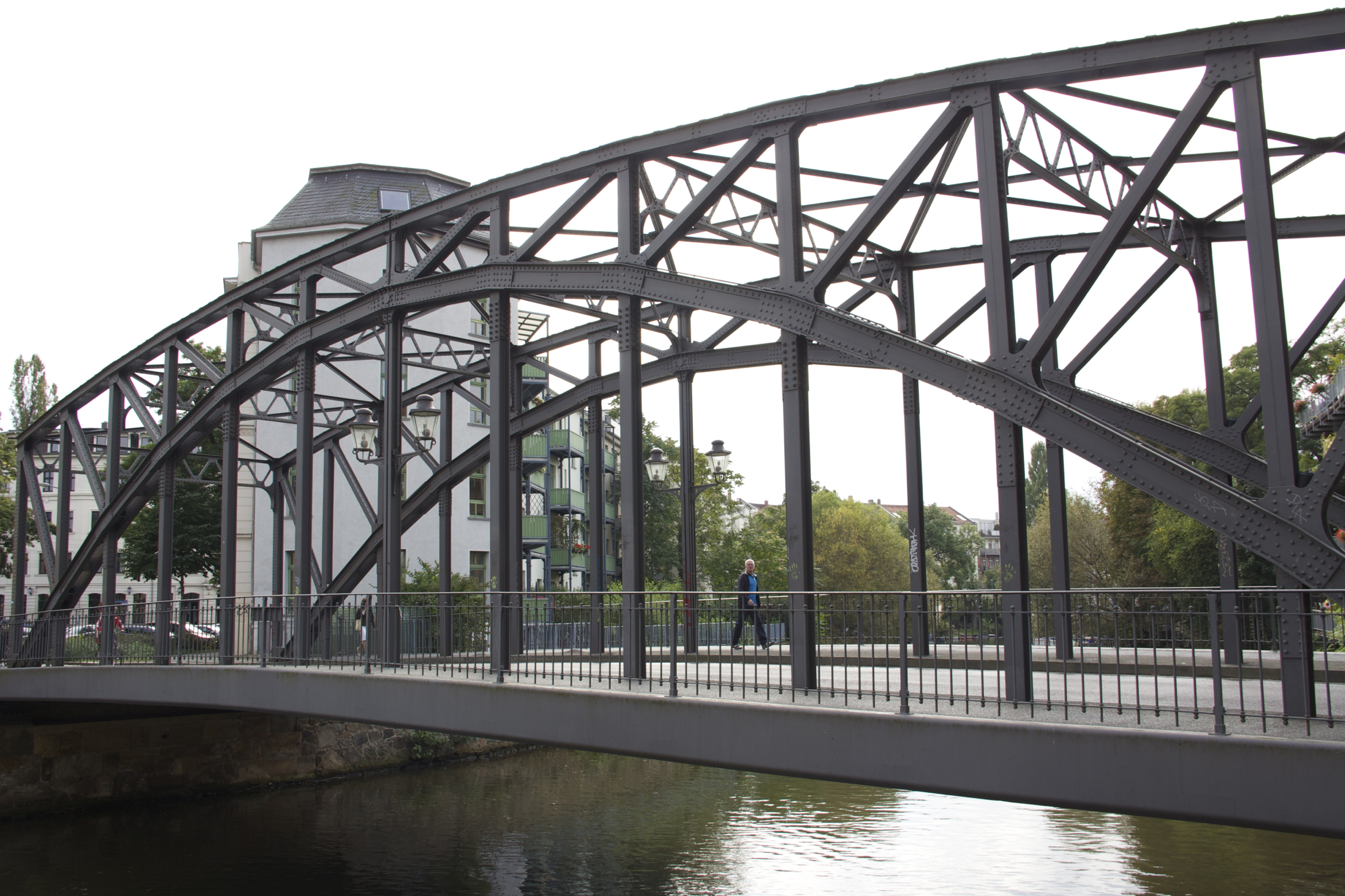
- View from south (2012)
- Coordinates: 51°19′47″N 12°20′46″E
- Carries: Ernst-Mey-Strasse
- Locale: Schleußig and Plagwitz
- Named for: Koenneritz Street
- Owner: City of Leipzig
- Heritage status: Cultural property

Characteristics
- Design: Truss bridge
- Material: Steel
- Width: 31 m (101.7 ft)

History
- Opened: 1899
- Rebuilt: 2002
- Replaces: A wooden bridge

Location
- Interactive map of Koenneritz Bridge

The Koenneritz Bridge (German: Könneritzbrücke) spans the White Elster in Leipzig in Germany and connects the localities of Plagwitz and Schleußig in the Leipzig borough Southwest (German: Stadtbezirk Südwest). From Schleußig in the southwest, the Koenneritz Street (German: Könneritzstraße) leads onto the bridge and continues to Plagwitz in the northeast under the name Ernst-Mey-Strasse. The bridge is named after the street which was named after Leonce von Könneritz (1835–1890) who was Member of the Reichstag (German Empire) (1874–1877) and finance minister of the Kingdom of Saxony (1876–1890).

== History ==
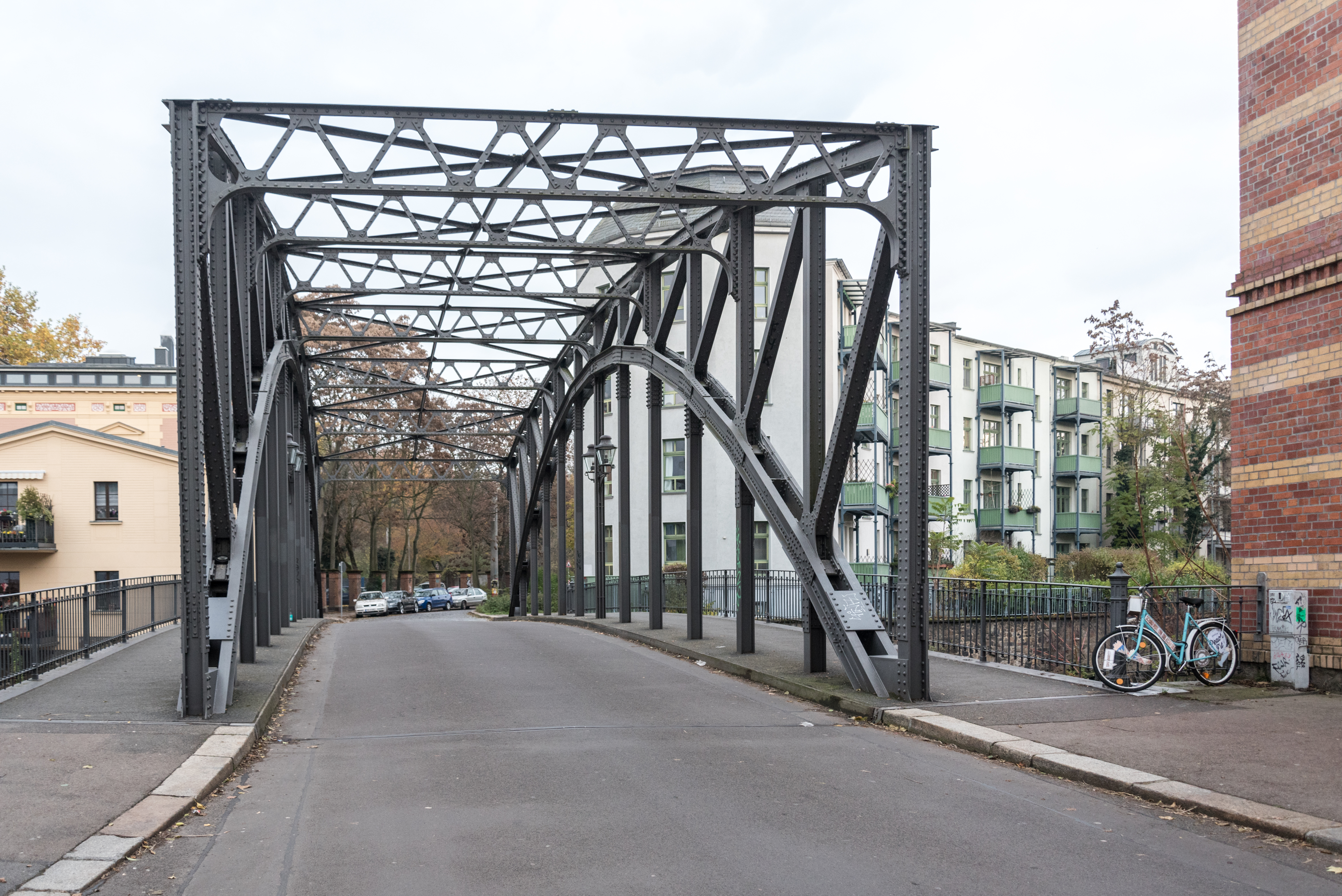
Koenneritz Bridge, Leipzig (2016), seen from Nonnenstrasse

The Koenneritz Bridge was built in 1870 as a wooden bridge for the connection to the industrially up-and-coming Plagwitz. For this purpose, the material of the wooden bridge built in 1858 was used in place of today's Plagwitz Bridge which is located somewhat further north. In 1899, the wooden bridge, which no longer met the requirements, was replaced by a then state-of-the-art iron construction in its present form. The Koenneritz Bridge is now protected as a technical monument.

The steel truss bridge was extensively renovated from May 2002 to 13 November 2002 by Mitteldeutsche Bergbau Service GmbH, whereby the entire structure was lifted out with a special crane, reworked elsewhere and then reinstalled by crane over the White Elster. A new orthotropic deck was installed in the bridge as a roadway slab. The substructures were retained.

== In popular culture ==
In 1992, the music video for the single Die da?! by the German hip-hop group Die Fantastischen Vier was filmed on the Koenneritz Bridge.
