= Sascha Panknin =

Sascha Panknin (born March 19, 1967) is a German musician, songwriter and record producer, and a founding member and bassist of the band disjam.

His 5000 Records label has released artists such as TGFA, Deja-Move, Superpulse, James Newton Adams and the compilation series Brazil 5000.

He has also played on German chart-topper albums of Die Fantastischen Vier and Fettes Brot, and has collaborated with UK artists Lemn Sissay, (Dr.) Robert Howard and Martin Glover.

He is also a member of the bands James Newton Adams and Superpulse.
