= Jaa =

Jaa can refer to the following:

- Jaa (Newa cuisine) or jā, staple boiled rice of the Newars people in Nepal.
- Jaa (Filipino cuisine) or lokot-lokot, a fried dough delicacy in the Filipino cuisine
- Tony Jaa, Thai martial art film actor
- Jaaa, song by artist "Die Fantastischen Vier" from their album "Vier gewinnt"
- Jaa, Punjabi song by Dakssh Ajit Singh 'n' Mannat Singh released by Tasbee Muzic

== See also ==
- JAA (disambiguation), an abbreviation
