= Die da!? =

Single by Die Fantastischen Vier

from the album 4 gewinnt
- Released: 1992
- Genre: Hip hop
- Length: 4:11
- Label: Columbia
- Songwriter: Thomas D
- Producer: Andreas Rieke

Die Fantastischen Vier singles chronology
"Hausmeister Thomas D" (1991)	"Die da!?" (1992)	"Frohes Fest" (1992)

"Die da!?" ("Her?! The one over there?!") is a song by the German hip hop group Die Fantastischen Vier. It was released in 1992 from the album 4 gewinnt and samples Asha Puthli's song "Right Down Here".

The music video was filmed on the Koenneritz Bridge in Leipzig.

== Track listing ==
CD

1. Die da!?! (Radio Mix) (3:38)
2. Die da!?! (Maxi Mix) (5:39)
3. Wer da?! (Trance Mix) [Who is here?!] (6:11)

Maxi vinyl

1. Die da!?! (Maxi Mix) (5:39)
2. Wer da?! (Trance Mix) (6:11)

== Charts ==
Chart (1992)	Chart position
Austria (Ö3 Austria Top 40)	1
Germany (GfK)	2
Netherlands (Single Top 100)	36
Switzerland (Schweizer Hitparade)	1

== Certifications ==
Region	Certification	Certified units/sales
Austria (IFPI Austria)	Gold	25,000^{*}
Germany (BVMI)	Gold	250,000^{^}
^{*} Sales figures based on certification alone.^{^} Shipments figures based on certification alone.
