= D92 =

D92 may refer to:

- D 92 road (United Arab Emirates)
- HMS Liverpool (D92), a British Royal Navy destroyer
- Grünfeld Defence, Encyclopaedia of Chess Openings code
- "Hausmeister Thomas D. '92", a song by Die Fantastischen Vier from the album Jetzt geht's ab!
