= Lauschgift =

Studio album by Die Fantastischen Vier
- Released: 11 September 1995
- Genre: German hip hop
- Length: 56:04
- Label: Columbia
- Producer: Andreas Rieke

Die Fantastischen Vier chronology
Die 4. Dimension (1993)	Lauschgift (1995)	Live und direkt (1996)

Professional ratings
Review scores
Source	Rating
AllMusic	2.5/5 stars

Lauschgift is the fourth studio album of the German hip hop group Die Fantastischen Vier. It peaked the German charts at position 2, the Austrian at 10, and the Swiss at position 5.

The title—a pun mixing the German noun Rauschgift ("narcotics") with the verb lauschen ("to listen, to eavesdrop")—was inspired by a scene in the film Breakfast at Tiffanys. The German-language dub of the film, in which I. Y. Yunioshi mispronounces the word Rauschgift, was sampled on the album's first track.

== Track listing ==
1. "Lauschgift" – 0:17
2. "Populär" – 3:28
3. "Sie ist weg" – 3:52
4. "Frühstück" – 0:39
5. "Was geht" – 3:58
6. "Nur in deinem Kopf" – 3:44
7. "Tokio – Paris" – 0:23
8. "Die Geschichte des O" – 4:00
9. "Ich bin" – 1:48
10. "Hey Baby" – 0:40
11. "Michi gegen die Gesellschaft" – 4:51
12. "Brems 2000" – 2:56
13. "Thomas und die Philosophie" – 4:39
14. "On the Next Album" – 0:48
15. "Locker bleiben" – 3:10 (with Rahzel)
16. "Love Sucks" – 4:20
17. "Wie die anderen" – 0:53
18. "Konsum" – 4:30 (with disJam)
19. "Krieger" – 6:36
20. "Albert und die Philosophie" – 0:32

== Singles ==
Year	Title	Chart positions		
Year	Title	Germany	Austria	Switzerland
1995	"Sie ist weg"	1	16	2
1996	"Populär"	41	—	39
1996	"Nur in deinem Kopf"	81	—	—
