= Bethanienkirche =

Coordinates: 51°19′16″N 12°20′50″E

German: Bethanienkirche, lit. 'Bethany Church'
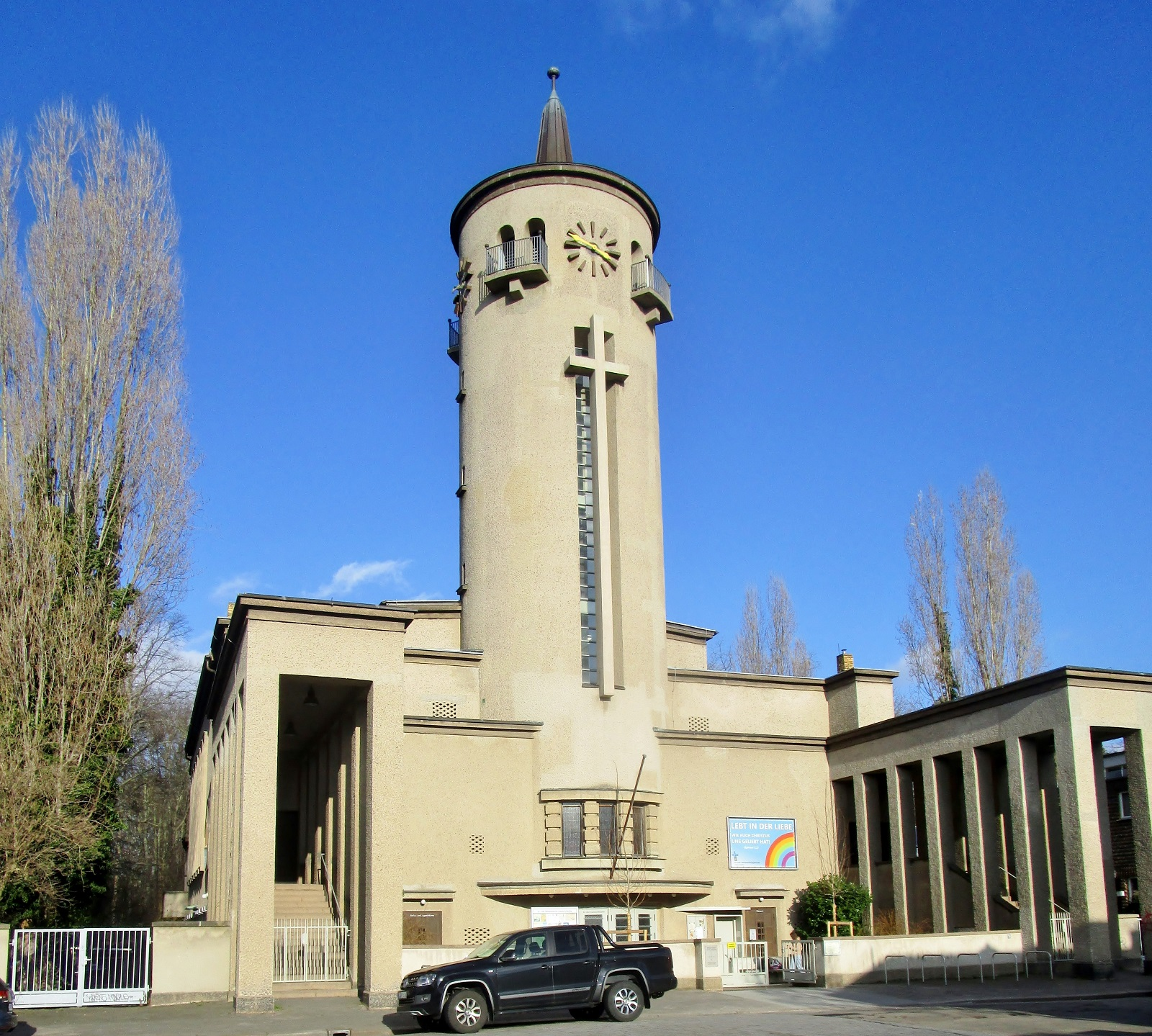
- German: Bethanienkirche, lit. 'Bethany Church'
- Location: Leipzig
- Country: Germany
- Denomination: Lutheran
- Website: www.bethanienkirche-leipzig.de

History
- Status: Parish church
- Founded: 29 January 1933

Architecture
- Functional status: Active
- Style: New Objectivity
- Years built: 1931–1933; 1993, 2008 (renovations)
- Groundbreaking: 11 October 1931

Administration
- Division: Evangelical-Lutheran Church of Saxony

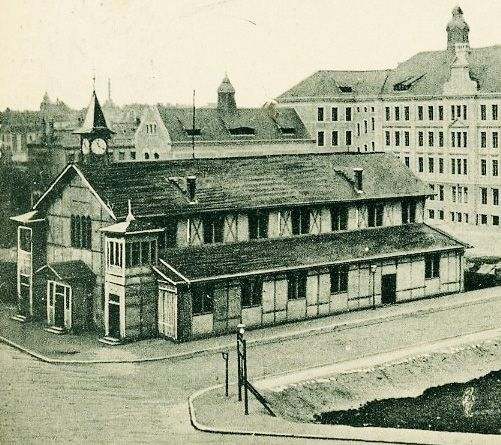
1905–1933 existing interim church in Schnorrstrasse

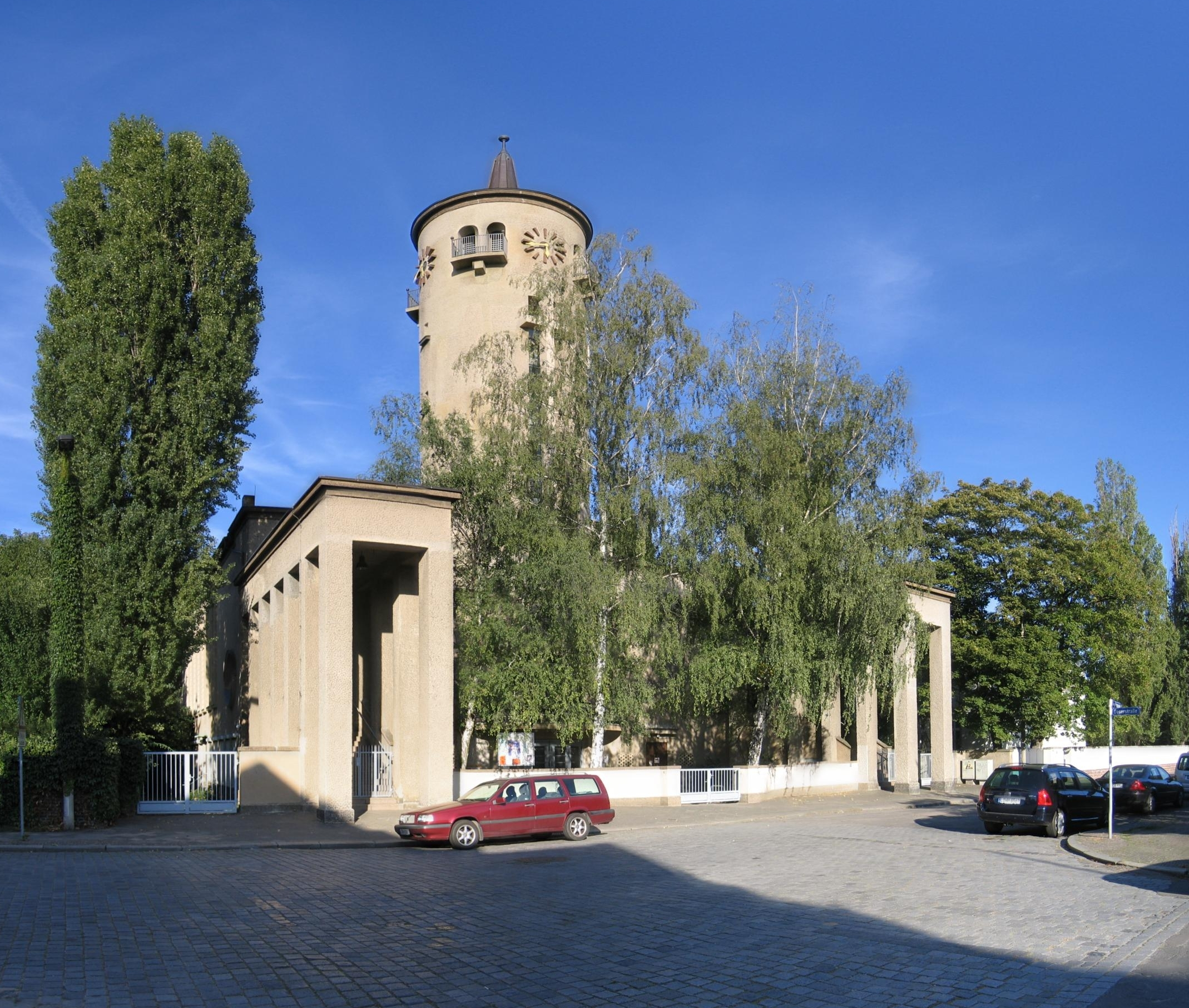
Bethanienkirche (Bethany Church)

The Bethanienkirche (Bethany Church) is a Lutheran church in the German city of Leipzig, in the locality of Schleußig. It was built in 1931–1933 and is under heritage protection.

== History ==
Schleußig, first mentioned in 1376 as Slizzig, belonged ecclesiastically to Kleinzschocher. In 1875 Schleußig had 285 inhabitants, in 1891, the year it was incorporated into Leipzig, there were already 1500. The church in Kleinzschocher was therefore used until 1892. On 30 October 1892 the first service in Schleußig took place in the auditorium of a school.

From 1904 to 1905, an interim church was built in the courtyard of the school at Schnorrstrasse 2 / Rödelstrasse. The half-timbered building, which was rebuilt here under the direction of the architect Conrad Hermsdorf, had previously served as an emergency church for Leipzig's Andreas and Michaelis congregations. On 30 September 1906, the parish was separated from Kleinzschocher, and on 6 January 1907, the first two parish priests were assigned to Schleußig. On the First Sunday of Advent of 1910, a parish hall was inaugurated on the property at Könneritzstrasse 92.

From 1912 onwards, the new pastors Kurt Schröder and Otto Flor pushed ahead with the new construction of the Bethanienkirche. Originally planned for 1915, this was not carried out until 1928 due to the First World War. On 24 April 1928, a plot of land of around 2,000 square metres (22,000 sq ft) on Stieglitzstrasse was acquired. An architectural design competition was announced for a shared building with a church space with 750 seats, a parish hall, confirmation rooms, an office and a sacristan's apartment. From 59 designs submitted, the jury, which met on 10 and 11 December 1928, awarded first prize to the design by Leipzig architects Carl William Zweck and Hans Voigt, and their design was approved for implementation by the church council. After minor changes, the plans were approved by the Leipzig City Council on 26 October 1929. Construction began on 12 June 1931, the groundbreaking was on 11 October 1931, and the topping-out ceremony took place on 21 November 1931. On 8 May 1932, three bells from the Franz Schilling & Sons bell foundry in Apolda were brought in and combined with the bell of the interim church.

After leaving the interim church on 22 January 1933, the new church was inaugurated by regional bishop Ludwig Ihmels on 29 January - one day before the seizure of power by the National Socialists in Germany. The parish rooms were inaugurated on 3 February 1933.

During the Second World War, the copper sheeting of the roof had to be handed over first, then the three large bronze bells. On 20 February 1944, the church (church windows, tower clock, roof, organ) was badly damaged by a bomb explosion nearby. It could not be used until 1948. The repairs by Emil Hörtzsch and Herbert Wurz were completed in 1950.

From 1953 onwards, the almost reverberation-free church space with its excellent acoustics served the Leipzig Radio Orchestra as a space for rehearsals and tape recordings. The rental income generated from this enabled a major interior renovation to be carried out in 1988. By renting it to the radio, the congregation did not need any subsidies from the regional church, and a large part of the costs for a new organ could also be covered from this. Over time, the small hall was renovated and redesigned, the congregational kitchen, chancellery and confirmation room were refitted, the church roof was re-covered, rust was removed from the bell tower and the tower blinds were renewed, and major plastering work was carried out on the arcades. The renovation of the church tower by the architects Schulz and Schulz was completed with the installation of a new tower cross on 21 July 2000. To improve access to the higher church space and the congregation halls in the basement, an elevator was installed in 2016. To gain access, one of the characteristic diamond-patterned windows to the right of the main entrance was removed.

== Architecture ==
The simple geometric architecture by Zweck and Voigt is in keeping with New Objectivity. The axially symmetrical plastered building is dominated by a 38.6 metres (127 ft) tall round tower. The upper end of the reinforced concrete skeleton tower has earned the church the nickname "lemon squeezer". The tower, which is modeled on Thuringian defense towers such as those of Saaleck Castle and in which the architects saw the embodiment of Luther's words "A mighty fortress is our God", has as its only decoration a 14 metres (46 ft) tall concrete cross that is indirectly illuminated at night. The entrance side of the church is designed like a court of honor and is flanked by two 14.5 metres (48 ft) long staircases with pillar arcades that lead to the church space on the main floor. The two staircases are reminiscent of outstretched arms, which the architects believe is an inviting gesture in keeping with Christ's words "Come to me, all of you" LUT. With an entrance at the front, away from traffic, special accents could be set despite the unfavorable road location.

The nave is 2.5 metres (8.2 ft) above street level, it measures 26 metres (85 ft) by 25 metres (82 ft) and is designed as a three-aisled nave with a choir. The prominent central nave is bordered by a higher chancel (with an altar made of red and gray marble by Otto Wutzler) and two flatter side aisles. Its interior layout corresponds to the principles of the Third Congress for Protestant Church Architecture in Magdeburg in 1928. The blue tones of the chancel with gold frames were somewhat controversial. They were only restored to their original state from 1933 during the renovation in 1988, after they had been painted over in the meantime.

The room, which is bathed in warm light and decorated with understated solemnity, is dominated by the central stained glass window "The Entering Christ" by Emil Block, which is designed like an altarpiece. Block is also the artist behind the two paintings set into the wall, "Mary and Martha" awaiting Jesus (LUT to the left of the choir) and "The Raising of Lazarus" (LUT to the right of the choir), which decorate the entrances to the sacristy and baptismal chapel. They are part of a Bethany iconography related to the altar window, which depicts Jesus visiting Martha and her sister Mary in Bethany, and depict events surrounding the sisters living in the Palestinian village and their brother Lazarus, who were special friends of Jesus according to the Gospel of John (LUT). The upper floor is characterized by the use of noble materials such as brass frames for the railings, doors and lamps as well as the floor made of Solnhofen slabs.

The less lavishly furnished basement floor, which is accessible via two staircases from the main floor or directly via the court, contains the community hall, which seats 240 and is accessed via glazed double doors. Floor-to-ceiling glass sliding doors separate the hall from the smaller community room. Both rooms can be connected to form a large hall. The interior furnishings include a stage, projection room, changing rooms and parquet flooring as well as simple wooden seating. The ceilings, lamps and doors in the basement have been preserved in their original state. The chancellery and confirmation room as well as the sacristan's apartment can be reached via separate entrances from the court. The accommodation of community and utility rooms together with the sacred rooms was an innovation at the time and embodied a modern understanding of religion and community life.

== Organ ==
The old organ, which had been in the church since 1933, had an electro-pneumatic action. When the problems became more and more serious in the early 1980s, it was decided to commission a new mechanical organ. Jehmlich Orgelbau Dresden delivered the new instrument on 20 March 1992 as Opus 1099. The organ was assembled and tuned by 14 May 1992 and handed over to the church council. It was inaugurated on 21 June 1992 as part of a celebratory service.

The new organ's location has remained the same. Despite the less than ideal acoustic conditions, it was reinstalled in the tower chamber behind a concrete arch for reasons of monument protection. The sound radiation was improved somewhat by a retracted baffle and suspended ceilings.
