= Lass die Sonne rein =

Single by Die Fantastischen Vier

from the album 4 gewinnt
- Released: 1993
- Genre: Hip hop
- Length: 4:09
- Label: Columbia
- Songwriter: Thomas D
- Producers: Andreas Rieke, Andreas "DJ Bär" Läsker, Klaus Scharff

Die Fantastischen Vier singles chronology
"Saft" (1992)	"Lass die Sonne rein" (1993)	"Zu geil für diese Welt" (1993)

"Lass die Sonne rein" ("Let the Sun In") is a song by the German hip hop group Die Fantastischen Vier. It was released in 1993 from the album 4 gewinnt.

== Track listing ==
1. "Lass' die Sonne rein" (4:09)
2. "Es wird Regen geben (Remix)" (4:25)
3. "Nur ein Traum" (4:20)

== Charts ==
Country	Chart position
Germany	92
