= Saft (song) =

Single by Die Fantastischen Vier

from the album 4 gewinnt
- Released: 1992
- Genre: Hip hop
- Length: 14:14
- Label: Columbia
- Songwriter: Thomas D
- Producers: Andreas Rieke, Andreas "DJ Bär" Läsker, Klaus Scharff

Die Fantastischen Vier singles chronology
"Hausmeister Thomas D. '92" (1992)	"Saft" (1992)	"Lass die Sonne rein" (1993)

"Saft" (pronounced [zaft]; "Juice") is a song by the German hip hop group Die Fantastischen Vier. It was released in 1992 from the album 4 gewinnt. It tells about the "exchange of bodily fluids", dos and don'ts, pros and cons. The song reached number 38 on the Swiss record charts and number 19 in Germany.
