= Leipzig International School =

- Leipzig, Saxony; Germany

Information
- Type: International School
- Motto: Learning to be a citizen of the world.
- Established: 1992
- Head of school: Brandie Smith
- Staff: ca. 200
- Enrollment: ca. 1,050 (2026)
- Website: LIS homepage

Leipzig International School (LIS) is a non-profit co-educational day school for students from age 1 to age 18, in Leipzig, Germany, and was the first international school in central Germany, and is now the largest, with around 1050 students from 77 countries. LIS employs over 190 staff members, from 20 different nationalities. The school's campuses are located in the districts of Plagwitz (Leipzig International Kindergarten), and Schleußig (school campus). English is the language of instruction at LIS, meaning that all subjects, except for additional languages and German, are taught in English. Leipzig International School is led by Brandie Smith (head of school).

== Profile ==
Leipzig International School provides international education in English for children from diverse backgrounds, supports the local community and promotes intercultural understanding. The programme at LIS ranges from kindergarten to grade 12. Approximately 1050 students from the region and around the world learn together to prepare for internationally recognised school-leaving qualifications that qualify them for higher education at leading universities in Germany and around the world.

The school is divided into three sections:

- Leipzig International Kindergarten with Nursery 1 & 2 - age-alike groups for children from one year old through to three years; and Early Years 1, 2 & 3 - (Kindergarten/Preschool) for children from three year old through to six years;
- Primary school - grades 1 to 5; and
- Secondary school - grades 6 to 12.

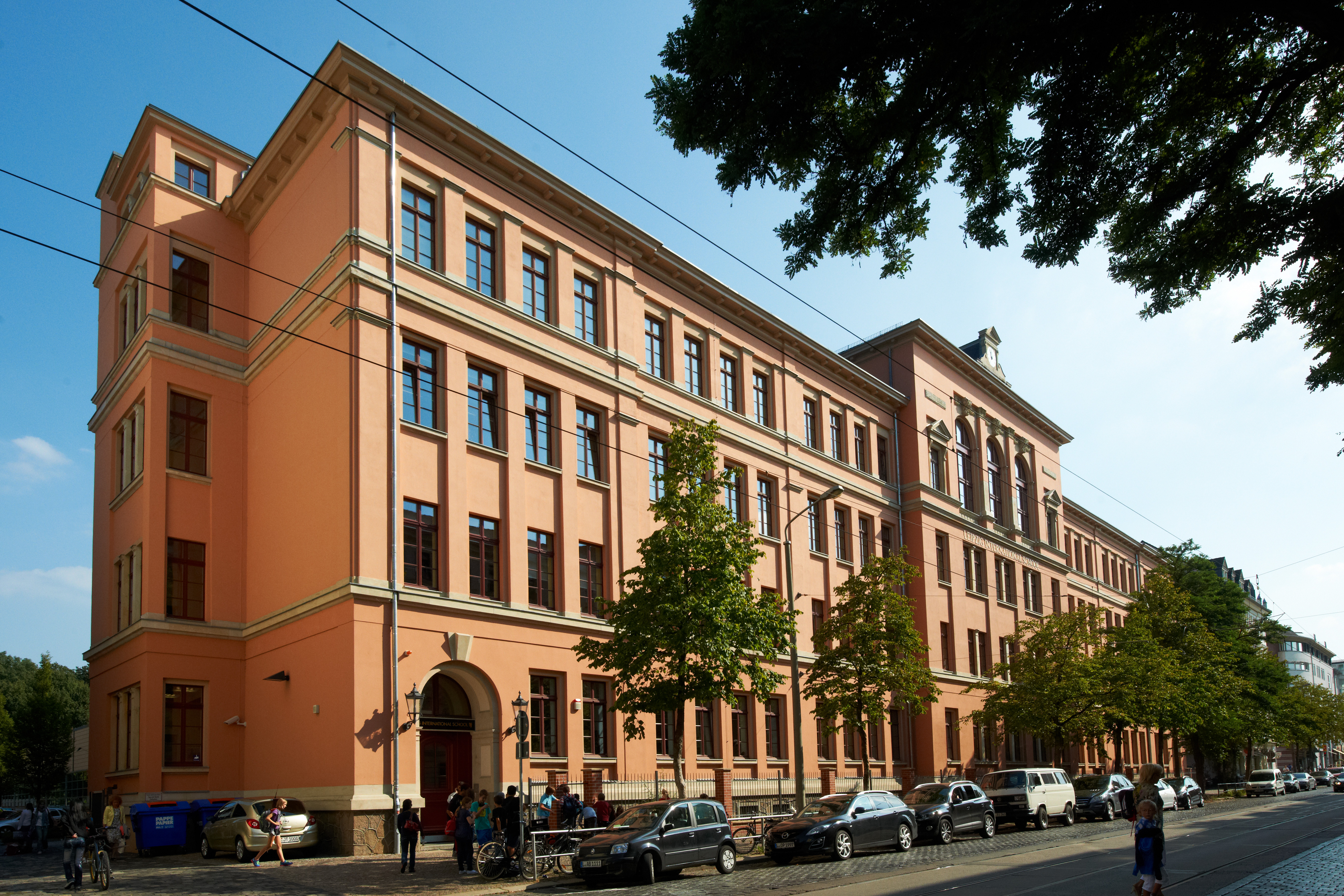
Leipzig International School/ Photo: Peter Usbeck

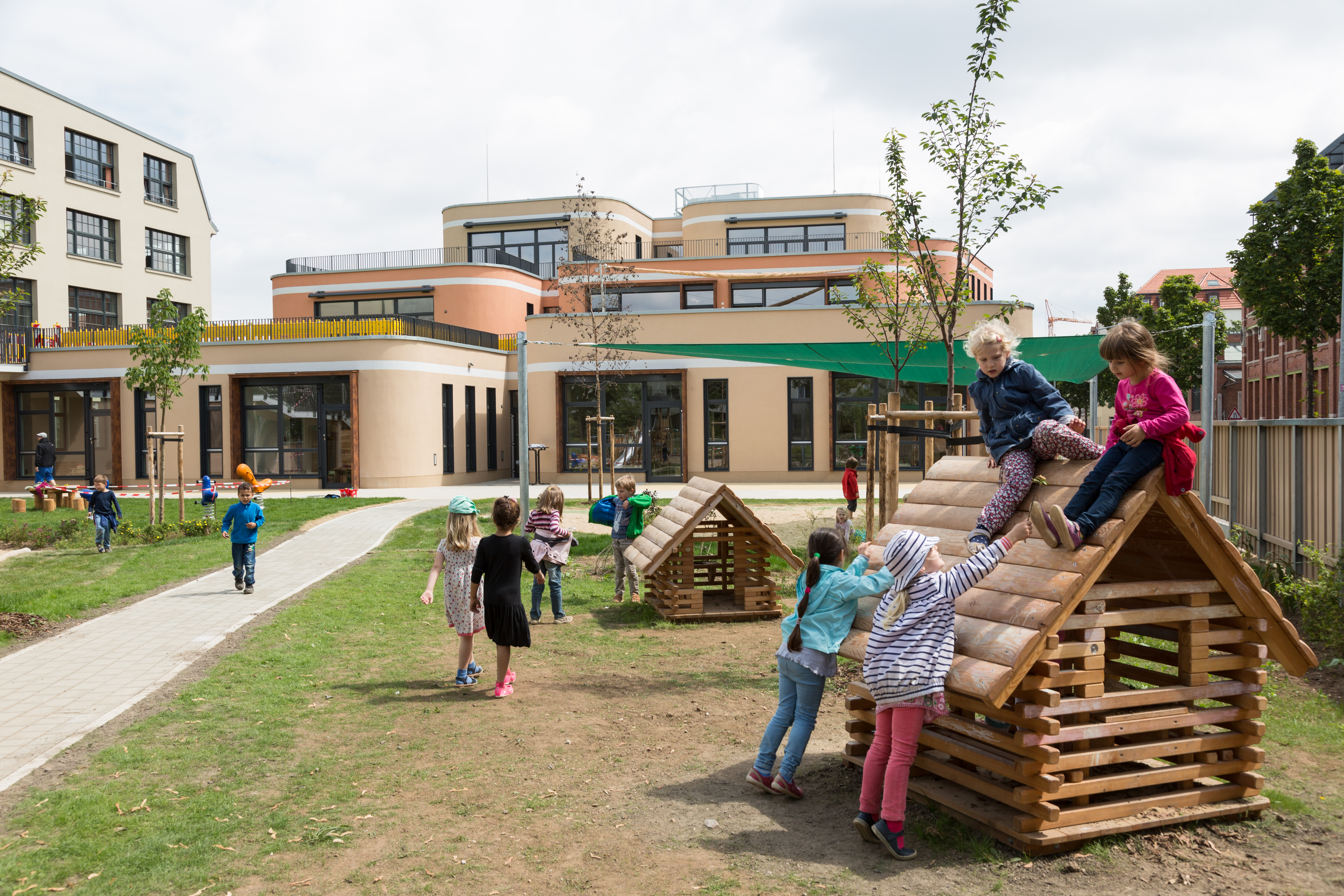
Leipzig International Kindergarten Photo: Peter Usbeck

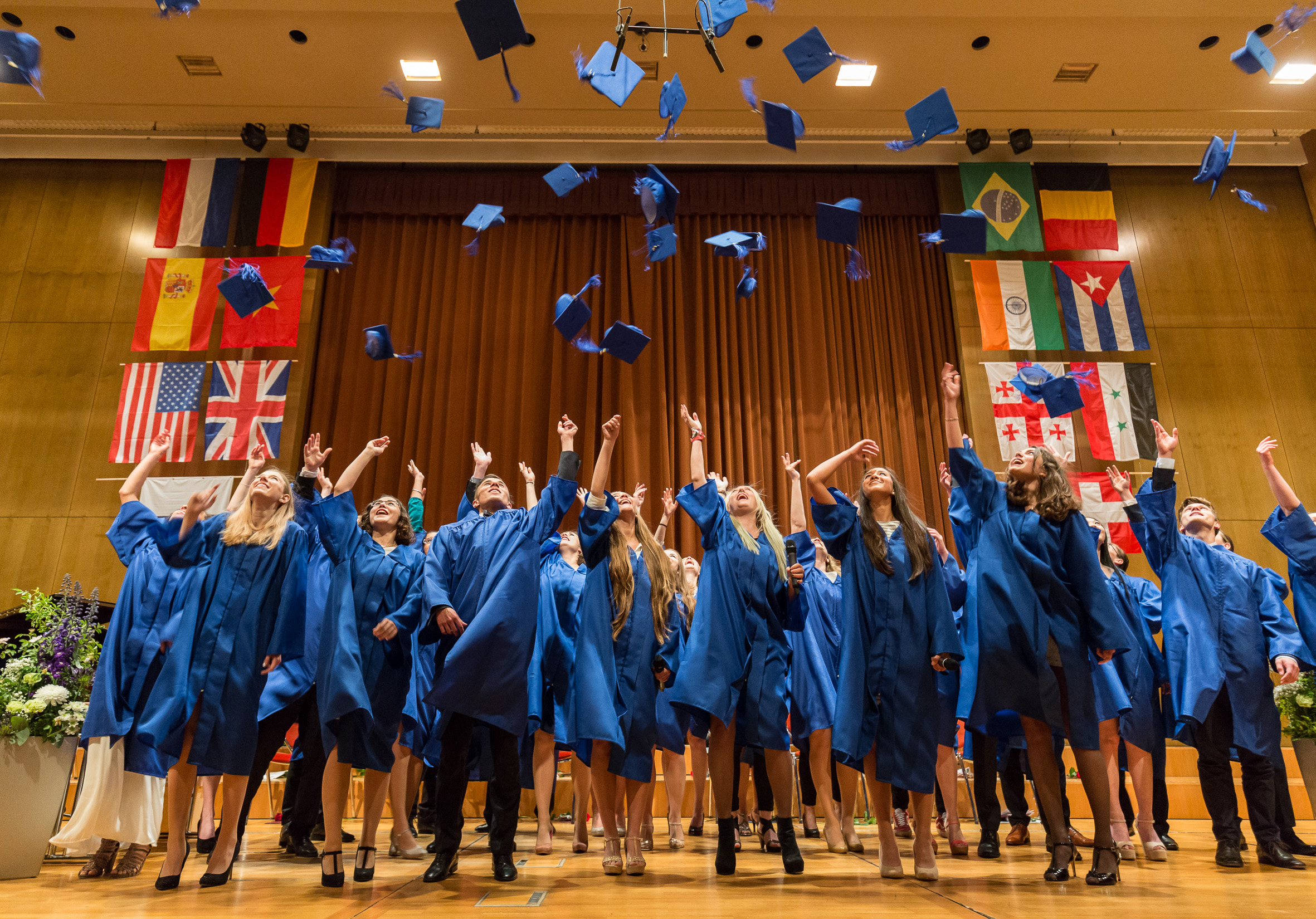
LIS - IB Graduation Ceremony Photo: Peter Usbeck

== Educational offerings ==
Language of instruction is English. German is taught both as an additional language and in standard classes following the state curriculum. French and Spanish are also offered as foreign languages in the secondary school. Additional learning support and varied counselling services are also available to all. The primary school follows an international, inquiry-based curriculum framework and the secondary school the Cambridge secondary 1 and IGCSE programme. The gateway to higher education is the international baccalaureate diploma programme. Extra-curricular activities include language courses (Chinese, Russian, Arabic, Spanish, French, and Portuguese), sports, arts, drama, robotics, astronomy, film & photo club, music lessons and much more. Student support services include counselling, learning support, medical support, child welfare and protection, and universities and careers support. An in-house nurses provide immediate care and health education.

== Facilities ==
The 1880s school building was extensively renovated in 2007 and enhanced by new construction. In addition to more than 70 classrooms equipped with interactive whiteboards, facilities include a large sports hall, after-school care (Hort) facilities and a playground, science laboratories, music and art rooms, an international library, and computer labs. WiFi is accessible throughout the buildings. The Leipzig International Kindergarten is a purpose-built facility for the youngest children, opened in 2014.

== History ==
LIS opened its doors as a kindergarten in 1992, with just three children and one teacher. In 1993 grade one was added, and the school was approved by the State of Saxony and granted official status (German: Ersatzschule). Following the reunification of Germany, international companies started moving to Leipzig, and their employees and families necessarily followed. In 1995, LIS began providing secondary education for the children of these families, thus contributing to the economic and cultural renaissance of the city and surrounding region.

By 1997, the school had reached 70 students in grades one to eight.

In 1998 the International General Certificate of Secondary Education (IGCSE) was introduced at grade nine level. The International Baccalaureate (IB) Diploma Programme followed in 2000, initially being taught to an intimate group of three students.

In 2001, the school moved into its current premises, and in 2001 there were 120 students. This year, Michael Webster (GB) take up the headship of LIS. At the end of the year, four students were celebrated as the first to take IB examinations and graduate from LIS.

During the 2003–04 school year the primary school ran separate classes at each grade level for the first time. In 2005-06 the school received a grant of almost €8 million for building renovations and the construction of a new sports facility on the Könneritzstraße grounds. Enrolment rose to 420 students that year.

After eight years of service, Michael Webster retired in July 2009, handing over to Roel Scheepens (NL). In January 2012 accreditation was granted from the Council of International Schools (CIS) and the New England Association of Schools and Colleges (NEASC) after a two-year long accreditation self-study.

From August 2014 to July 2021 David Smith was the head of school. In 2014 LIS opened its second campus, the Early Childhood Centre - which is now named Leipzig International Kindergarten, in neighbouring Plagwitz.

In 2021, Brandie Smith, stepped into the role of Head of School and has overseen the 30th Anniversary year of LIS and in early 2024, the announcement that the school looks to building a new campus on Plagwitz opposite the Kindergarten campus. However, in September 2025, plans to build a new campus on the "Jahrtausendfeld" were cancelled.

== Governance ==
The head of school is responsible for all aspects of staffing and education throughout the school. Each school section has a leader who reports directly to the head of school. The commercial director is responsible for all business and facility management aspects of the school. Together with the head of school, the commercial director oversees finances, human resources, facility management, ICT, marketing and communication.

The gGmbH (company with limited liability) is the legal organisation which owns and governs the school. The company is a charitable company (gemeinnützig) and is managed by the head of school and commercial director (managing directors).

This charitable trust is a legal form that guarantees the continued existence of the school into the future, guarded over by the Stiftungsaufsicht of the state of Saxony. The trust has a board whose tasks are to exercise the rights of the trust as the only shareholder of the school, the GmbH, and to support the school in accordance with the aims set out in its statutes.
