= Viel =

Studio album by Die Fantastischen Vier
- Released: 27 September 2004
- Genre: German hip hop
- Length: 55:34
- Label: Columbia
- Producer: Michael Beck

Die Fantastischen Vier chronology
Live in Stuttgart (2003)	Viel (2004)	Fornika (2007)

Professional ratings
Review scores
Source	Rating
laut.de	link

Viel is the sixth studio album of the German hip hop group Die Fantastischen Vier. It peaked at No. 2 on the German and Austrian charts and at No. 4 in Switzerland.

== Track listing ==
1. "Auf geht's" – 1:05
2. "Bring it back" – 3:46
3. "Geboren" – 3:51
4. "Jede Generation" – 3:42
5. "Pipis und Popos" – 4:42
6. "Leben zu zweit" – 3:47
7. "Sommerregen" – 5:33
8. "Ewig" – 4:52
9. "Keine Lösung" – 3:53
10. "Hey" – 4:04
11. "Mein Schwert" – 5:44
12. "Ruf die Polizei" – 3:36
13. "Troy" (homophonous with Treu – "loyal") – 4:29
14. "Viel" – 2:26

== Singles ==
Year	Title	Chart positions		
Year	Title	Germany	Austria	Switzerland
2004	"Troy"	9	11	22
2004	"Sommerregen"	44	66	74
2005	"Geboren"	48	—	48
