= Live in Stuttgart =

Live album by Die Fantastischen Vier
- Released: 15 December 2003
- Recorded: 21 September 2003
- Venue: Römerkastell (Stuttgart)
- Genre: German hip hop
- Length: 116:28
- Label: Four Music

Die Fantastischen Vier chronology
MTV Unplugged (2000)	Live in Stuttgart (2003)	Viel (2004)

Professional ratings
Review scores
Source	Rating
laut.de	link

Live in Stuttgart is a live double album by German hip hop group Die Fantastischen Vier. It was recorded on 21 September 2003 at the Römerkastell in Stuttgart, the last show of the group's Unplugged-tour. Due to many requests from fans for a recording of the final show, the label founded by Die Fantastischen Vier, Four Music, decided to release a double-CD record of the show.

Live in Stuttgart peaked at No. 81 in the German charts and at No. 50 in Austria.

== Track listing ==
1. "Die vierte Dimension"
2. "Neues Land"
3. "Die Stadt die es nicht gibt"
4. "Le Smou"
5. "Ganz normal"
6. "Der Picknicker"
7. "Hammer"
8. "Konsum"
9. "Liebesbrief"
10. "Weiter als du denkst"
11. "Sie ist weg"
12. "Jetzt geht's ab"
13. "Beweg deinen Popo"
14. "Schizophren"
15. "Buenos dias Messias"
16. "Populär"
17. "MfG"
18. "Was geht"
19. "Griechischer Wein" (a cover of the Schlager by Udo Jürgens)
20. "Pipis & Popos"
21. "Millionen Legionen"
22. "Tag am Meer"
