= Schleußig =

- Stadtteil of Leipzig
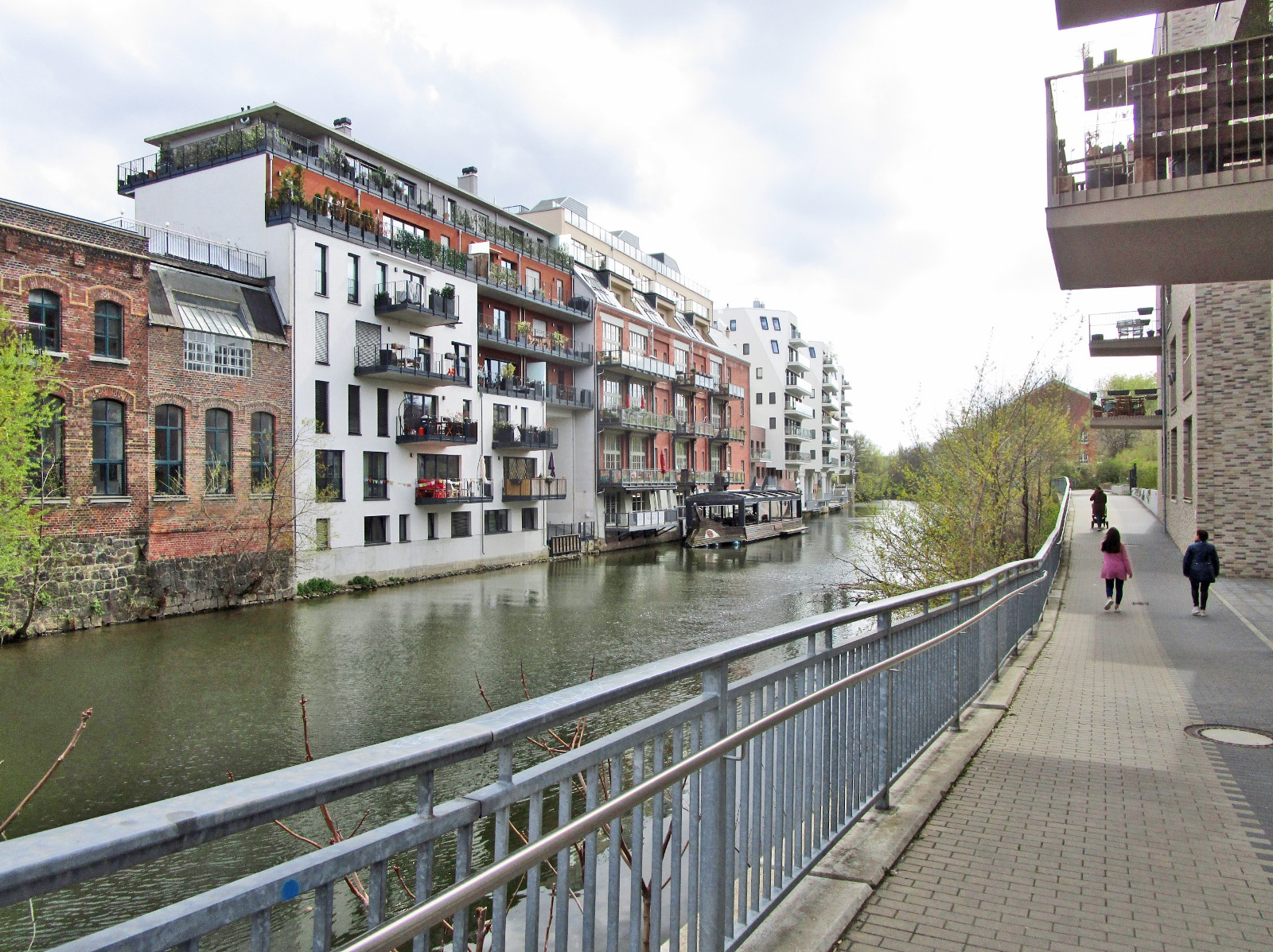
- Interactive map of Schleußig
- Location within Germany Location within Saxony
- Coordinates: 51°19′10″N 12°20′35″E
- Country: Germany
- State: Saxony
- District: Urban district
- City: Leipzig

Area
  - Total: 2.09 km^{2} (0.81 sq mi)

Population (2023)
  - Total: 12,545
  - Density: 6,000/km^{2} (15,500/sq mi)
- Time zone: UTC+01:00 (CET)
  - Summer (DST): UTC+02:00 (CEST)
- Postal codes: 04229
- Dialling codes: 0341

Schleußig (German pronunciation: [ˈʃlɔʏsɪç]; or Schleussig) is a locality of Leipzig in Germany. It is in the borough (Stadtbezirk) Südwest (southwest).

First mentioned in 1391 under the name of Slizzig, Schleußig acquired the status of a rural municipality in 1835 before being integrated into Leipzig in 1891.

A good third of the locality is occupied by the Nuns' Woods (Nonnenholz) of the Leipzig Riverside Forest (Leipziger Auwald) and a small part by the Clara-Zetkin-Park.

The largely closed Wilhelminian-style development, the proximity to local recreational areas as well as to the town centre make Schleußig an attractive residential area.

== Geography ==
Schleußig is located about (2 km (1.2 mi) southwest of the city center. The north–south extent of Schleußig is about (3.5 km (2.2 mi), the widest point in the east–west direction is less than (2 km (1.2 mi).

To the east, the Lower Elster Derivation (Elsterflutbett) and to the west the course of the White Elster River form the locality boundary. Schleußig is the only locality in Leipzig that is almost entirely surrounded by waterways and is therefore only accessible by bridges. It is therefore at risk of flooding. Large parts of the adjacent locality Bachviertel were last flooded in July 1954 by floods from the White Elster.

== Population ==
The locality had 12,545 inhabitants on 31 December 2023.

| Year | Residents |
|---|---|
| 1834 | 101 |
| 1871 | 282 |
| 1890 | 1.437 |
| 1895 | 3.231 |
| 1900 | 9.162 |
| 1927 | 17.072 |
| 1981 | 12.505 |
| 1992 | 9.862 |
| 2000 | 8.774 |
| 2005 | 10.506 |
| 2010 | 12.165 |
| 2015 | 12.577 |
| 2020 | 12.828 |
| 2023 | 12.545 |

== Schools ==
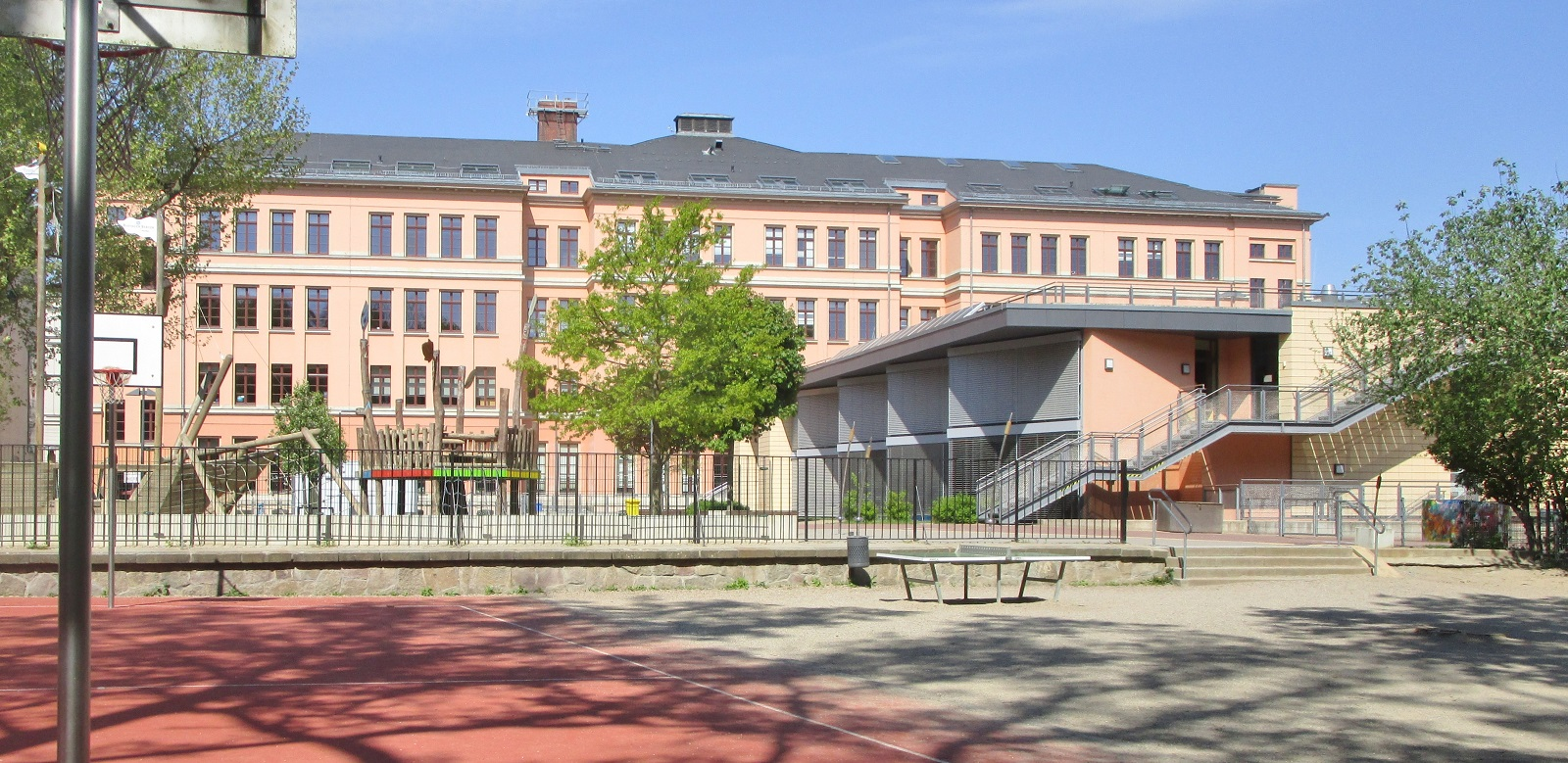
Leipzig International School

Schleußig is home to the Schule am Auwald (primary school) and Leipzig International School, run by a gGmbH and offering English-language education from kindergarten to grammar school.

== Boat tourism ==
Due to its location, a lively boating industry has developed in Schleußig during the summer months. On water hiking maps and on the children's town map it is easy to see that Schleußig can be circumnavigated on a (9 km (5.6 mi) long route, boating course 7 of the Leipzig Neuseenland, in light boats with portages on the southern tip. There are several private boat rental companies on both the east side on the Elster derivation and the west side on the White Elster. Three quarters of the boating course leads through forest and park areas, while the quarter on the northwest section of the White Elster offers an impressive urban backdrop. Old listed factories that have been converted to residential use extend right up to the water on both the Schleußig and Plagwitz sides. The junction with the Karl Heine Canal is also located in this sector.

== Personalities ==
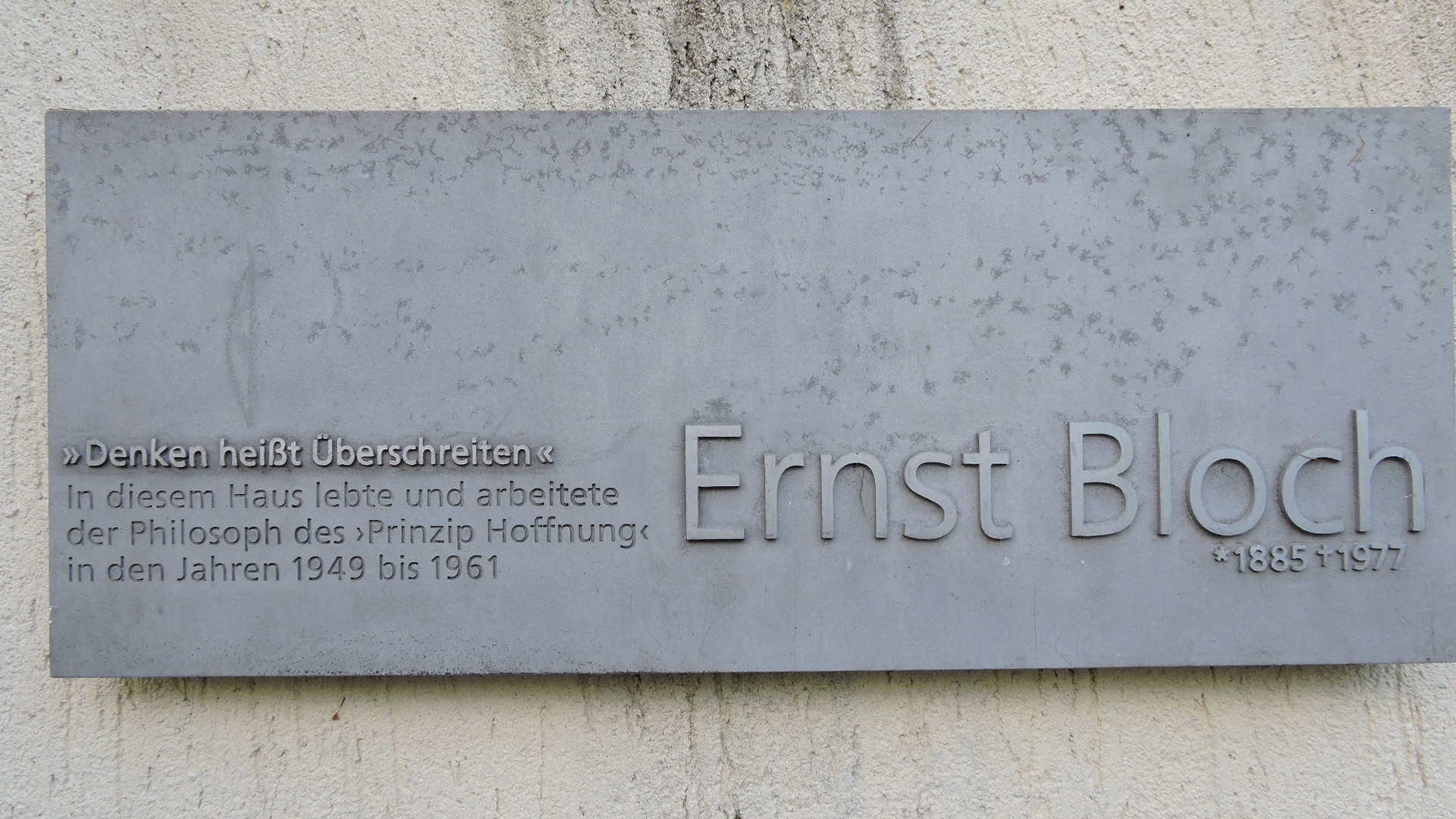
Memorial plaque on the house of Ernst Bloch (after a drawing by the Leipzig artist Ulf Puder)

- Carl Erdmann Heine, often: Karl Heine (1819–1888), entrepreneur, landowner, developer of Schleußig
- Ernst Bloch (1885–1977), philosopher, lived in Wilhelm-Wild-Str. 8 in Schleußig
- Eduard Pendorf (1892–1958), German footballer
- Peter Oehme (b. 1937), German physician and pharmacologist
- Arno Rink (1940–2017), painter and rector of the Leipzig University of Fine Arts, lived in Schleußig

== See also ==
- Bethanienkirche
- Bodies of water in Leipzig
- Koenneritz Bridge
