= JAA =

JAA is an abbreviation that can refer to

- Jund Ansar Allah
- Japan Aikido Association
- Japan Asia Airways
- Japanese American Association of New York
- Japanese Archaeological Association
- Jet Asia Airways
- Joint Aviation Authorities of Europe
- Jacksonville Aviation Authority

== See also ==
- Jaa (disambiguation)
