= Heimspiel =

Live album by Die Fantastischen Vier
- Released: 2 October 2009
- Recorded: 25 July 2009
- Venue: Cannstatter Wasen (Stuttgart)
- Genre: German hip hop
- Length: 135:41
- Label: Sony BMG

Die Fantastischen Vier chronology
Fornika (2007)	Heimspiel (2009)	Für dich immer noch Fanta Sie (2010)

Professional ratings
Review scores
Source	Rating
laut.de	4/5 stars

Heimspiel is the 2009 live album by German hip hop group Die Fantastischen Vier in celebration of their 20th anniversary as a band. It featured a crowd of 60,000 people, making this their biggest concert ever at the time.

== Track listing ==
=== Disc one ===
1. "Was geht" - 7:02
2. "Der Picknicker" - 4:40
3. "Jetzt geht's ab" - 2:17
4. "S.M.U.D.O. Ich bin halt so" - 2:46
5. "Auf der Flucht" - 2:31
6. "Du Arsch" - 2:35
7. "Neues Land" - 3:13
8. "Mehr nehmen" - 4:43
9. "Pipis und Popos" - 4:55
10. "Sie ist weg" - 4:01

=== Disc two ===
1. "Ich is ich is ich is ich" - 4:54
2. "Le Smou" - 4:35
3. "Beweg deinen Popo" - 5:23
4. "Yeah Yeah Yeah" - 5:04
5. "Spiesser" - 3:01
6. "Krieger" - 7:34
7. "Schizophren" - 5:16
8. "Sommerregen" - 5:57
9. "Fornika" - 6:24
10. "MfG" - 3:58

=== Disc three ===
1. "Liebesbrief" - 6:38
2. "Bring It Back" - 3:16
3. "Troy" - 6:35
4. "Die da" - 5:35
5. "Einfach sein" - 4:10
6. "Tag am Meer" - 6:53
7. "Ernten was wir säen" - 7:16
8. "Populär" - 4:32
