= Captain Fantastic (album) =

Studio album by Die Fantastischen Vier
- Released: 27 April 2018
- Genre: German hip hop
- Label: Columbia; Sony BMG
- Producer: And.Ypsilon

Die Fantastischen Vier chronology
Rekord (2014)	Captain Fantastic (2018)	Long Player (2024)

Singles from Captain Fantastic
- 1. "Endzeitstimmung" Released: 17 November 2017; 2. "Tunnel" Released: 16 February 2018; 3. "Zusammen" Released: 23 March 2018

Captain Fantastic is the tenth full-length studio album by German hip hop group Die Fantastischen Vier.

== Release and reception ==
The album was published on 27 April 2018. From the album, the title "Zusammen" was released as a single. It was chosen as the official song for the 2018 FIFA World Cup by the German broadcaster Das Erste.

The album peaked at number two of the German charts, number one in Switzerland, and number three in Austria.

On the website laut.de, Captain Fantastic was rated with 3 out of 5 stars. The magazine Rolling Stone (German version) rated it with 3 out of 5.

== Track listing ==
No.	Title	Length
1.	"Captain Fantastic"	3:01
2.	"Tunnel"	3:45
3.	"Zusammen (feat. Clueso)"	3:44
4.	"Fantanamera"	4:12
5.	"Moduland.Y"	2:09
6.	"Hitisn"	3:58
7.	"Watchmen"	5:15
8.	"Alle (Skit)"	0:48
9.	"Endzeitstimmung"	3:40
10.	"Hot (feat. Flo Mega)"	4:35
11.	"Henson J.J. Barkley (Skit)"	1:18
12.	"Aller Anfang Ist Yeah"	3:51
13.	"Das ist mein Ding"	3:16
14.	"Affen mit Waffen"	3:52
15.	"Hitisn Reprise (feat. Tom Gaebel)"	2:10
16.	"Weitermachen (feat. Damion Davis)"	4:05

== Charts ==
=== Weekly charts ===
Chart (2018)	Peak position
Austrian Albums (Ö3 Austria)	3
German Albums (Offizielle Top 100)	2
Swiss Albums (Schweizer Hitparade)	1

=== Year-end charts ===
Chart (2018)	Position
German Albums (Offizielle Top 100)	18

== Certifications ==
Region	Certification	Certified units/sales
Germany (BVMI)	Gold	100,000^{‡}
^{‡} Sales+streaming figures based on certification alone.
