= Live und direkt =

Live album with studio CD by Die Fantastischen Vier
- Released: 12 October 1996
- Recorded: 19 February 1996; 22 February 1996; 1 June 1996
- Venue: Huxleys Neue Welt (Berlin); Turbinenhalle (Oberhausen); Theaterhaus (Stuttgart)
- Genre: German hip hop
- Length: 75:14 (live part); 37:22 (studio part)
- Label: Columbia
- Producer: Andreas Rieke

Die Fantastischen Vier chronology
Lauschgift (1995)	Live und direkt (1996)	4:99 (1999)

Professional ratings
Review scores
Source	Rating
AllMusic	2.5/5 stars

Live und direkt is a double album by German hip hop group Die Fantastischen Vier, consisting of a live part and a studio part. The live part was recorded at three concerts during the Lauschgift-tour with their then backing band disJam, at Huxleys Neue Welt in Berlin on 19 February 1996; at the Turbinenhalle in Oberhausen on 22 February 1996 and during the Bear Music Days in Die Fantastischen Vier's hometown Stuttgart, the Theaterhaus Wangen on 1 June 1996.

The studio part features both previously unreleased tracks and remixes by Waxdoctor, Kenny 'Dope' Gonzales, Die Krupps, Aphex Twin and Guru of Gang Starr.

As a gimmick, the "direkt" CD contains a data part featuring a screensaver, an interactive press kit and three video clips of the group.

== Track listing ==
=== Live ===
1. "Intro" - 1:23
2. "Locker bleiben" - 4:04
3. "Ganz normal" - 4:08
4. "Hip Hop Musik" - 5:54
5. "Auf der Flucht" - 4:37
6. "Die Geschichte des O." - 4:21
7. "Ich bin" - 4:07
8. "Tag am Meer" - 6:36
9. "Konsum" - 4:24 min
10. "Sie ist weg" - 4:01
11. "Mach dich frei" - 3:11
12. "Ich krieg nie genug" - 5:26
13. "Was geht" - 4:21
14. "Love sucks" - 4:46
15. "Krieger" - 9:04
16. "Populär" - 4:51

=== Direkt ===
1. "Raus" (previously unreleased) - 4:02
2. "Der Picknicker" (previously unreleased) - 3:50
3. "Das Kind vor dem euch alle warnten" (previously unreleased) - 5:13
4. "Was geht - Kenny Dope Mix" - 4:58
5. "Sie ist weg - Guru Remix"- 3:51
6. "Tag am Meer - Waxdoctor Remix" - 7:10
7. "Krieger - Aphex Twin Baldhu Mix" - 3:22
8. "Genug ist genug - Die Krupps Remix" - 4:37

== Singles ==
Year	Title	Chart positions	
Year	Title	Germany	Austria
1996	"Raus"	56	38
1997	"Der Picknicker"	42	—
