= Frohes Fest (song) =

Single by Die Fantastischen Vier
- Released: 1992
- Genre: Hip hop
- Length: 12:41
- Label: Columbia
- Songwriter: Thomas D
- Producers: Andreas Rieke, Andreas "DJ Bär" Läsker, Klaus Scharff

Die Fantastischen Vier singles chronology
"Die da!?" (1992)	"Frohes Fest" (1992)	"Hausmeister Thomas D. '92" (1992)

"Frohes Fest" ("Merry Christmas") is a song by the German hip hop group Die Fantastischen Vier, released in 1992. From 1993 to 2018, the song was 'indexed' (banned) in Germany by the Federal Department for Media Harmful to Young Persons.

== Track listing ==
1. Frohes Fest (6:05)
2. Eins und eins (1:54)
3. Frohes Fest (instrumental) (4:42)

== Charts ==
Country	Chart position
Austria	20
Germany	15

== Sources ==
- Frohes Fest (song) at Discogs
- Frohes Fest (song) at Discogs
