= Jetzt geht's ab! =

Studio album by Die Fantastischen Vier
- Released: 27 August 1991
- Genre: German hip hop
- Length: 49:59
- Label: Columbia
- Producer: Andreas Rieke

Die Fantastischen Vier chronology
Jetzt geht's ab! (1991)	4 gewinnt (1992)

Professional ratings
Review scores
Source	Rating
AllMusic	2.5/5 stars

Jetzt geht's ab! is the debut album of the German hip-hop group Die Fantastischen Vier.

Originally released by Sony in 1991, the album was the first to feature exclusively German-language rap. Two members of Die Fantastischen Vier—Smudo and Thomas D—decided to create an album entirely in German after a visit to the United States inspired them. It is said that "it became apparent to them that they had nothing in common with the rappers of Los Angeles and that US rappers were speaking of a real environment containing elements totally foreign to the essentially middle-class world of the vier."

Throughout the 24 tracks on Jetzt geht's ab!, Die Fantastischen Vier express their views on personal relationships and intimacy, rather than focusing solely on social problems and political discourse, allowing them to "communicate strong emotions and shared experiences into the German sphere by shifting its subject matter."

== Track listing ==
1. "Jetzt passt auf"
2. "Wo geht's lang?"
3. "Hausmeister Thomas "D" (LP-Mix)"
4. "Großstadt"
5. "Ich muss"
6. "45 Fieber"
7. "Zerkratzt"
8. "Mikrofonprofessor"
9. "Fühl dich frei"
10. "Dumm, das!"
11. "Ich krieg nie genug"
12. "Das Interview"
13. "Jetzt geht's ab (Radio Edit)"
14. "Das geschieht dir recht I"
15. "S.M.U.D.O. ich bin halt so"
16. "Das geschieht dir recht II"
17. "Auf der Flucht"
18. "Das geschieht dir recht III"
19. "Kartoffelclip"
20. "Spießer"
21. "Du Arsch"
22. "Hausmarke ist..."
23. "Böse"
24. "Is ja gut jetzt"

== Personnel ==
- Thomas Dürr (Thomas D)
- Michael "Smudo" Schmidt
- Michael "Michi" Beck
- Andreas "And.Ypsilon" Rieke

=== Production ===
- Executive producer: Andreas Rieke
- Co-producer: Klaus Scharff
- Consulting producer: Andreas "DJ Bär" Läsker
