= 4:99 =

Studio album by Die Fantastischen Vier
- Released: 4 June 1999
- Genre: German hip hop
- Length: 58:10
- Label: Four Music
- Producer: Andreas Rieke

Die Fantastischen Vier chronology
Live und direkt (1996)	4:99 (1999)	Unplugged (2000)

Professional ratings
Review scores
Source	Rating
AllMusic	3/5 stars
laut.de	4/5 stars

4:99 is the fifth studio album by German hip hop group Die Fantastischen Vier. It reached number one in the German as well as the Austrian and Swiss charts.

As seen before on the album Live und direkt, the CD contains a multimedia part with some gimmicks like the music video to "MfG".

== Track listing ==
1. "Und täglich grüßen Fanta Vier/Romantic Fighters" – 1:23
2. "30 Mark" – 0:42
3. "MfG – Mit freundlichen Grüßen" – 3:35
4. "Hammer" – 4:59
5. "Die Stadt, die es nicht gibt" – 4:29
6. "00:29" – 0:29
7. "Alles schon gesehen" – 4:25
8. "Michi Beck in Hell" – 5:12
9. "Home Again" – 0:44
10. "Le Smou" – 4:38
11. "Weiter als du denkst" – 5:22
12. "Millionen Legionen" – 5:38
13. "Schmock" – 4:16
14. "FunkYms20" – 1:45
15. "Hoffnung" – 5:05
16. "Buenos Días Messias" – 4:31
17. "Gute Nacht" – 0:58

== Charts ==
=== Weekly charts ===
Chart (1999)	Peak position
Austrian Albums (Ö3 Austria)	1
German Albums (Offizielle Top 100)	1
Swiss Albums (Schweizer Hitparade)	1

=== Year-end charts ===
Chart (1999)	Position
Austrian Albums (Ö3 Austria)	8
German Albums (Offizielle Top 100)	6
Swiss Albums (Schweizer Hitparade)	31

=== Singles ===
Year	Title	Chart positions		
Year	Title	Germany	Switzerland	Austria
1999	"MfG"	2	2	2
1999	"Michi Beck in Hell"	—	—	—
1999	"Le Smou"	68	—	—
1999	"Buenos Días Messias"	87	—	—
