= MTV Unplugged (Die Fantastischen Vier album) =

Live album by Die Fantastischen Vier
- Released: 13 November 2000
- Genre: German hip hop
- Length: 71:39
- Label: Sony

Die Fantastischen Vier chronology
4:99 (1999)	MTV Unplugged (2000)	Live in Stuttgart (2003)

Professional ratings
Review scores
Source	Rating
AllMusic	3/5 stars
laut.de	4/5 stars

MTV Unplugged is part of the MTV Unplugged series and the second live album of German hip hop group Die Fantastischen Vier. The group were the second German-speaking artists to make an appearance on MTV Unplugged, after Herbert Grönemeyer in 1995. Contrary to the wishes of the producers, the concert was not recorded in MTV studios in London, but in the Balver Höhle (Balver cave), a cave in the Sauerland used mainly for Balver Märchenwochen.

The album peaked at No. 6 in the German charts as wells as at No. 7 and No. 18 in Austria and Switzerland.

== Track listing ==
1. "Neues Land" - 3:16
2. "Die Stadt die es nicht gibt" - 4:47
3. "Der Picknicker" - 4:23
4. "Jetzt geht's ab" - 3:07
5. "Hammer" - 4:55
6. "Raus" - 4:17
7. "Millionen Legionen" - 6:14
8. "Le Smou" - 4:30
9. "Ganz normal" - 3:33
10. "Sie ist weg" - 3:54
11. "Tag am Meer" - 5:05
12. "Weiter als du denkst" - 5:13
13. "Konsum" - 4:26
14. "Buenos Dias Messias" - 4:50
15. "Schizophren" - 4:52
16. "MfG" - 4:17

== Additional musicians ==
- Flo Dauner
- Lillo Scrimalli
- Markus Kössler
- Roland Peil
- Markus Birkle
- Michael Heupel
- Anja Bukovec
- Marko Hval
- Gareth Lubbe
- Maike Schmersahl
- Ruben Mesado
- Mirjam Trück
- Razvan Popovici
- Gabriel Mesado
- Matthias Trück
- Emanuela Simeonova
- Manu & Matei Constantin

== Singles ==
Year	Title	Chart positions	
Year	Title	Germany	Switzerland
2000	"Tag am Meer (Unplugged)"	67	—
2000	"Sie ist weg (Unplugged)"	81	50
