= Rekord (album) =

Studio album by Die Fantastischen Vier
- Released: 24 October 2014
- Genre: German hip hop
- Label: Columbia, Sony BMG
- Producer: And.Ypsilon

Die Fantastischen Vier chronology
Für dich immer noch Fanta Sie (2010)	Rekord (2014)	Captain Fantastic (2018)

Rekord is the ninth full-length studio album by German hip hop group Die Fantastischen Vier. It was released on 24 October 2014, marking the 25th anniversary of the group.

== Musical content ==
On the album, which mainly contains hip hop and pop songs, Fanta 4 also experiment with the styles of Dubstep ("Heute", "Wie geliebt") and R'n'B ("Lass sehen"). A reviewer in Frankfurter Allgemeine Zeitung said that the band's performance on this album shows "Unbeirrbarkeit, Humor und einem großen Gespür für die Haken" ("imperturbability, humor and a great sense of the hook"), and hails the "Fantastic Four" as pioneers of hip-hop.

== Writing and production ==
For the anniversary song "25" Don Snow a.k.a. Jonn Savannah sang his hit "25 Years" with slightly different lyrics. "Disco" features Miss Platnum.

== Release and reception ==
Rekord was published on 24 October 2014. From the album, the titles "Und los", "25", and "Single" were released as singles.

The album peaked at number one of the German charts a week after publication, was awarded gold and sold more than 200,000 copies.

On laut.de, it was rated with 3 out of 5 stars.

== Track listing ==
No.	Title	Length
1.	"25"	3:03
2.	"Heute"	3:44
3.	"Und los"	3:57
4.	"Lass sehen"	4:06
5.	"Gegen jede Vernunft"	3:33
6.	"Typisch ich"	3:24
7.	"Wie geliebt"	4:14
8.	"Single"	5:02
9.	"Disco"	4:57
10.	"Der Mann den nichts bewegt"	5:02
11.	"Frieden wie denn"	4:46
12.	"Gott ist mein Zeuge"	4:58
13.	"Das Spiel ist aus"	3:33

== Charts ==
=== Weekly charts ===
Chart (2014)	Peak position
Austrian Albums (Ö3 Austria)	4
German Albums (Offizielle Top 100)	1
Swiss Albums (Schweizer Hitparade)	2

=== Year-end charts ===
Chart (2014)	Position
German Albums (Offizielle Top 100)	35
Swiss Albums (Schweizer Hitparade)	91
