= Für dich immer noch Fanta Sie =

2010 studio album by Die Fantastischen Vier

Studio album by Die Fantastischen Vier
- Released: 25 May 2010
- Genre: German hip hop
- Label: Sony BMG

Die Fantastischen Vier chronology
Heimspiel (2009)	Für dich immer noch Fanta Sie (2010)	Rekord (2014)

Für dich immer noch Fanta Sie is the eighth studio album by German hip hop group Die Fantastischen Vier.

== Track listing ==
1. Wie Gladiatoren – 3:44
2. Dann mach doch mal – 4:11
3. Gebt uns ruhig die Schuld (den Rest könnt ihr behalten) – 4:14
4. Für dich immer noch Fanta Sie Teil 1 – 1:46
5. Junge trifft Mädchen – 4:28
6. Garnichsotoll – 5:10
7. Smudo in Zukunft – 3:01
8. Danke – 4:08
9. Die Lösung – 4:12
10. Schnauze – 3:35
11. Für immer zusammen – 4:24
12. Für dich immer noch Fanta Sie Teil 2 – 1:37
13. Das letzte Mal – 4:06
14. Kaputt – 4:19
15. Mantra – 5:49
16. Was wollen wir noch mehr? – 5:16

== Charts ==
=== Weekly charts ===
Chart (2010)	Peak position
Austrian Albums (Ö3 Austria)	2
German Albums (Offizielle Top 100)	1
Swiss Albums (Schweizer Hitparade)	1

=== Year-end charts ===
Chart (2010)	Position
Austrian Albums (Ö3 Austria)	65
German Albums (Offizielle Top 100)	18
Swiss Albums (Schweizer Hitparade)	51
