= Die 4. Dimension =

Album by German hip hop group Die Fantastischen Vier

Studio album by Die Fantastischen Vier
- Released: 8 November 1993
- Genre: German hip hop
- Length: 49:08
- Label: Columbia
- Producer: Andreas Rieke

Die Fantastischen Vier chronology
| 4 gewinnt (1992) | Die 4. Dimension (1993) | Megavier (1994) |

Die 4. Dimension ("The Fourth Dimension") is the third studio album by the German hip hop group Die Fantastischen Vier. It peaked at number 14 on the German charts, number 23 on the Austrian charts, and at number 27 in Switzerland.

== Track listing ==
1. "Neues Land" ("New Land") – 2:06
2. "Die 4. Dimension" (The 4th Dimension") – 4:38
3. "Tag am Meer" ("A day at the sea") – 4:17
4. "Zu geil für diese Welt" ("Too cool for this world") – 4:07
5. "Weiter weg" ("Further Away") – 0:54
6. "Schizophren" ("Schizophrenic") – 5:01
7. "Ganz normal" ("Totally normal") – 3:34
8. "Smudo schweift aus" ("Smudo wanders off") – 3:47
9. "Noch weiter weg" ("Even further away") – 0:59
10. "Sieh dich im Spiegel an" ("Look at yourself in the mirror") – 3:57
11. "Laut reden nichts sagen" (Talking loud [and] saying nothing") – 3:31
12. "Alles ist neu" ("Everything is new") – 3:34
13. "Ganz weit weg" ("Very far away") – 1:05
14. "Mach dich frei" ("Make yourself free") – 3:25
15. "Genug ist genug" ("Enough is enough") – 4:03
16. "Weg" ("Away" or "Gone") – 0:04

== Singles ==
| Year | Title | Chart positions | | |
| Year | Title | Germany | Switzerland | Austria |
|---|---|---|---|---|
| 1993 | "Zu geil für diese Welt" (as "Megavier") | 22 | — | 20 |
| 1993 | "Tag am Meer" | — | — | — |
