= 4 gewinnt =

Studio album by Die Fantastischen Vier
- Released: 28 August 1992
- Genre: German hip hop
- Length: 61:21
- Label: Columbia
- Producer: Andreas Rieke

Die Fantastischen Vier chronology
Jetzt geht's ab! (1991)	4 gewinnt (1992)	Die 4. Dimension (1993)

Professional ratings
Review scores
Source	Rating
AllMusic	2.5/5 stars

4 gewinnt (pronounced Vier gewinnt, [ˈfiːɐ̯ ɡəˈvɪnt]) is the second album by German hip-hop group Die Fantastischen Vier. The name refers to the German version of the game Connect Four. The album peaked at position 3 in Austria, Germany and Switzerland.

== Track listing ==
All tracks are written by Andreas Rieke, Smudo, Thomas D, Michi Beck

No.	Title	Length
1.	"Vier gewinnt"	3:52
2.	"Die da!?"	4:11
3.	"Hört euch den hier an"	1:32
4.	"Saft"	4:36
5.	"Dicker Pulli"	1:40
6.	"Na gut"	3:03
7.	"Einen noch"	0:32
8.	"Es wird Regen geben"	3:35
9.	"Nenn ihn Präsident"	2:12
10.	"Plattenspieler"	1:18
11.	"Hip Hop Musik"	4:38
12.	"Lass die Sonne rein"	4:09
13.	"Thomas und die Fraun"	3:14
14.	"Nonixnarretz"	0:40
15.	"Jaaa"	3:35
16.	"Reich"	1:30
17.	"Individuell aber schnell"	3:52
18.	"Arschloch"	13:11

== Personnel ==
- Thomas Dürr (Thomas D)
- Michael "Smudo" Schmidt
- Michael "Michi" Beck
- Andreas "And.Ypsilon" Rieke

=== Production ===
- Executive producer: Andreas Rieke
- Co-producers: Klaus Scharff, Andreas "Bär" Läsker
- Photo and cover artwork: I-D Büro

== Singles ==
Year	Title	Chart positions		
Year	Title	Germany	Switzerland	Austria
1992	"Die da!?"	2	1	1
1992	"Saft"	19	—	18
1993	"Lass die Sonne rein"	92	—	—
