= Fornika =

Studio album by Die Fantastischen Vier
- Released: 4 April 2007
- Genre: German hip hop
- Length: 53:42
- Label: Sony BMG
- Producer: Andreas Rieke

Die Fantastischen Vier chronology
Best of 1990–2005 (2005)	Fornika (2007)	Heimspiel (2009)

Singles from Fornika
- 1. "Ernten was wir säen" Released: 2 March 2007; 2. "Einfach Sein" Released: 25 May 2007; 3. "Ichisichisichisich" Released: 9 November 2009; 4. "Yeah Yeah Yeah" Released: 18 April 2008

Fornika is the seventh studio album by German hip hop group Die Fantastischen Vier. The name does not refer to the term of fornication. It comes from a strange misspelling of a pizza delivery service person that delivered pizza to the band's studio. Though they totally misspelled the name on the doorbell ("Fornika" instead of "Wernicke" and street "Emnhof" instead of "Immenhofer"), the pizza was still delivered. The name "Fornika" is an inside-band term for "strange things".

Professional ratings
Review scores
Source	Rating
laut.de	link (German)

== Track listing ==
1. "Mehr nehmen"
2. "Ernten, was wir säen" (feat. Münchener Freiheit)
3. "Einfach sein" (feat. Herbert Grönemeyer)
4. "Yeah Yeah Yeah"
5. "Nikki war nie weg"
6. "Fornika" (feat. Günter Amendt)
7. "Du mich auch"
8. "Mission Ypsilon" (instrumental)
9. "Ichisichisichisich"
10. "Einsam und zurückgezogen"
11. "Flüchtig"
12. "Du und sie und wir"
13. "Was bleibt" (feat. Max Herre)

=== Premium edition bonus disc ===
1. "Road to Fornika" (video)
2. "Ernten, was wir säen" (music video)

=== iTunes exclusive ===
Customers of the iTunes Store, who pre-ordered the album, also got exclusive live recordings of the band. These include:

1. "Spießer '94"
2. "Old School Medley"
3. "Locker bleiben"
4. "Geboren"

== Charts ==
=== Weekly charts ===
Chart (2007)	Peak position
Austrian Albums (Ö3 Austria)	4
German Albums (Offizielle Top 100)	1
Swiss Albums (Schweizer Hitparade)	2

=== Year-end charts ===
Chart (2007)	Position
Austrian Albums (Ö3 Austria)	63
German Albums (Offizielle Top 100)	9
Swiss Albums (Schweizer Hitparade)	49

=== Singles ===
Year	Title	Chart positions		
Year	Title	Germany	Austria	Switzerland
2007	"Ernten was wir säen"	12	35	25
2007	"Einfach sein"	11	13	22
2007	"Ichisichisichisich"	45	—	—
2008	"Yeah Yeah Yeah"	86	—	—

"Einfach sein" was the 43rd best-selling single of 2007 in Germany.
