= Bundesverband Musikindustrie =

German music industry organization

- Formation: 2007
- Type: Federal Music Industry Association
- Headquarters: Berlin, Germany
- Members: German Music Companies
- Chairman (CEO): Florian Drücke
- Key people: Managing Director: Florian Drücke
- Website: musikindustrie.de

The Bundesverband Musikindustrie (English: Federal Music Industry Association), or simply BVMI, represents the music industry in Germany. The association represents the interests of nearly 280 labels and music industry related enterprises, which comprise 90% of the music industry. It is a member of the London-based International Federation of the Phonographic Industry (IFPI), consisting of music associations of 70 countries.

BVMI works closely with GfK Entertainment (formerly Media Control GfK International, founded in 1976) which is in charge of publishing the music charts in Germany on weekly bases. BVMI, which is responsible for certifying Gold and Platinum awards, is led by Florian Drücke, who succeeded Dieter Gorny as chairman in 2017.

== Certification-awards ==
Germany launched its Gold and Platinum award program in 1975, and relies on an independent auditor for the accuracy of the sales required for the awards.

While the BVMI has been the certifying body in Germany for the past few decades, BVMI was not always in charge of certifying the records there. Phono Press also known as ZVEI (Zentralverband Elektrotechnik- und Elektronikindustrie) was the body in charge of tracking records sales and the certifications. During the 1970s and 1980s, the certification levels for singles in Germany were 500,000 units for Gold and 1,000,000 units for Platinum, while the certification levels for albums were 250,000 and 500,000, respectively.

BVMI instituted Diamond award on 1 June 2014 and applied the award to titles released starting from 1 January 2013.

Starting also from 1 June 2014, BVMI raised its certification-award-levels for the Singles, from the previous 150,000 units for Gold and 300,000 units for Platinum to 200,000 units for Gold and 400,000 units for Platinum. The change in the certification-levels of the Singles was affected by both inclusion of Streaming as well as an increase in sales of downloads that has been seen in recent years. 100 streams with the running time of at least 30 seconds or more, are considered as one single download.

BVMI follows the following pattern to certify records:

- 1× Gold
- 1× Platinum
- 3× Gold
- 2× Platinum
- 5× Gold
- 3× Platinum etc.

The association does not issue awards for 2× Gold or 4× Gold, which overlie the requirements of platinum certification awards. Sales of both physical and digital, whether it is an album or a single, can be included for certification.

=== Certifications timeline ===
Certifications levels are based on the recording release date, using the following thresholds:

Certification levels for albums
Certification	Before 25 September 1999	After 25 September 1999	After 1 January 2003	After 1 June 2014	After 29 June 2023
Gold	250,000	150,000	100,000	100,000	75,000
Platinum	500,000	300,000	200,000	200,000	150,000
Diamond	not awarded	not awarded	not awarded	750,000	750,000 (Unchanged)

Certification levels for singles
Certification	Before 1 January 2003	1 January 2003 to 1 June 2014	1 June 2014 to 29 June 2023	After 29 June 2023
Gold	250,000	150,000	200,000	300,000
Platinum	500,000	300,000	400,000	600,000
Diamond	not awarded	not awarded	1,000,000	1,500,000

Certification levels for videos
Certification	Since January 2002
Gold	25,000
Platinum	50,000

Certification levels Jazz recordings
Certification	Since January 1992
Gold	10,000
Platinum	20,000

== See also ==
- List of best-selling albums in Germany
- List of best-selling singles in Germany
- List of certified hip hop albums in Germany
- Global music industry market share data

== Notes ==
Notes

Note that Diamond-award both for the Singles and Albums will be applied to those titles released on/after 1 January 2013.
