= Die Fantastischen Vier =

German hip hop group

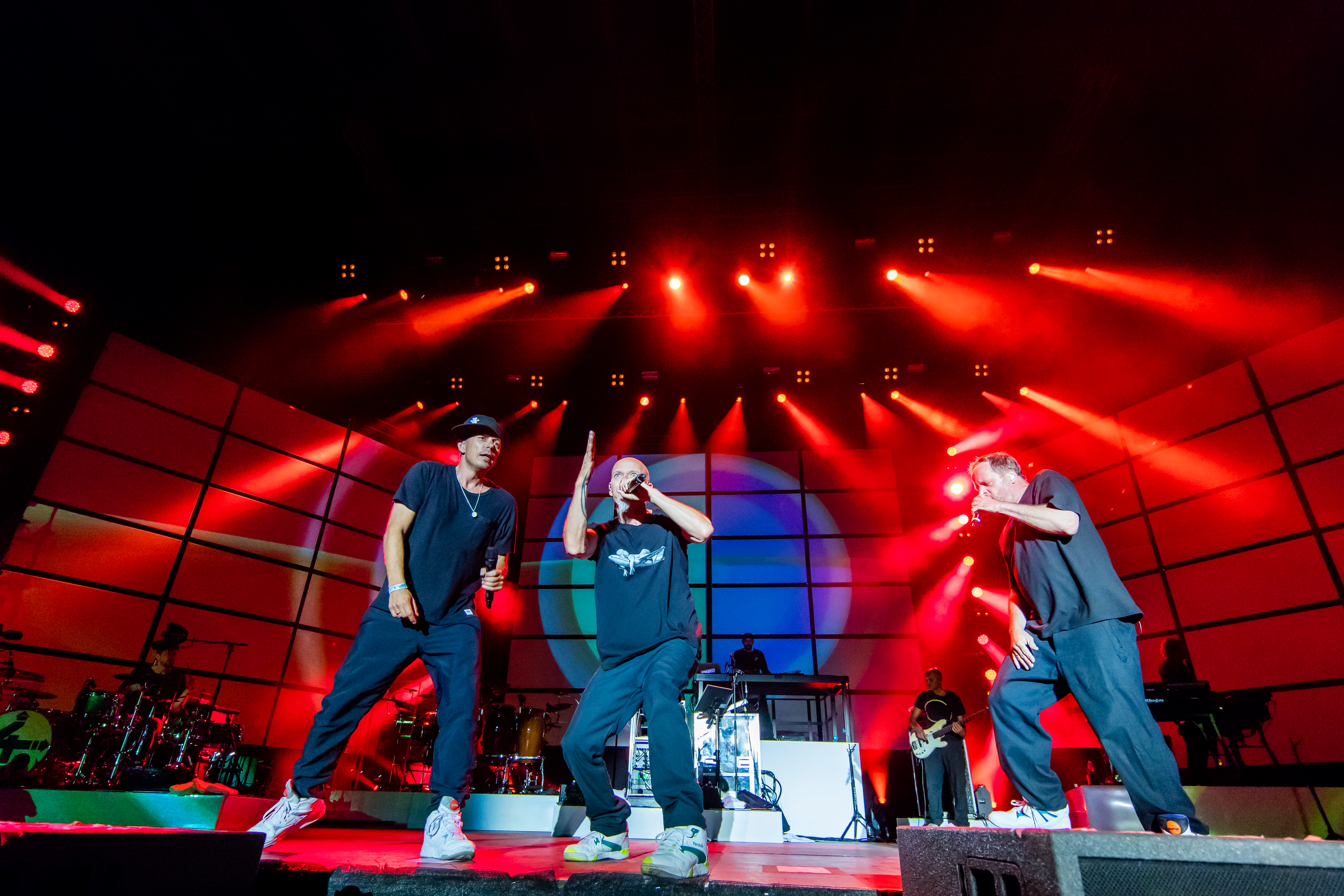
- Die Fantastischen Vier in 2016

Background information
- Origin: Stuttgart, Germany
- Genres: German hip hop, pop rap
- Years active: 1986 (1989) – present
- Labels: Four Music, Sony BMG
- Members: Michael "Michi" Beck; Thomas Dürr ("Thomas D"); Michael "Smudo" Schmidt; Andreas "And.Ypsilon" Rieke
- Website: diefantastischenvier.de

Die Fantastischen Vier (German pronunciation: [diː fanˈtastɪʃən ˈfiːɐ̯], "The Fantastic Four"), often shortened to Fanta 4, is a German hip hop band from Stuttgart. The members are Michael Schmidt (Smudo), Andreas Rieke, Thomas Dürr, and Michi Beck. They were, together with Advanced Chemistry, one of the earliest German-language rap groups.

== History ==
In the mid-1980s, Rieke and Schmidt formed the Terminal Team, which Dürr and Beck joined in 1989. Under the new name Die Fantastischen Vier they made German hip hop, or Deutschen Sprechgesang (German spoken song) as they called it, popular in Germany. Although there were German hip-hop artists prior to them (such as Advanced Chemistry from Heidelberg), it was Die Fantastischen Vier who registered the first chart hit with their 1992 single "Die da?!" (Her?!) from the album 4 gewinnt, hitting No. 2 in Germany and No. 1 in Austria and Switzerland.

After traveling to Los Angeles in the late 1980s, the group realized the lack of connection between the struggles of "the poor blacks in the United States and middle-class whites in Germany", and made a conscious effort to move away from the typical and cliché American gangsta rap. The group never got involved with gangsta rap clichés, reacting with tongue-in-cheek humor to verbal attacks of alleged German 'gangsta rappers'. In the albums following 4 gewinnt, the band matured and progressed to a more serious and philosophic style.

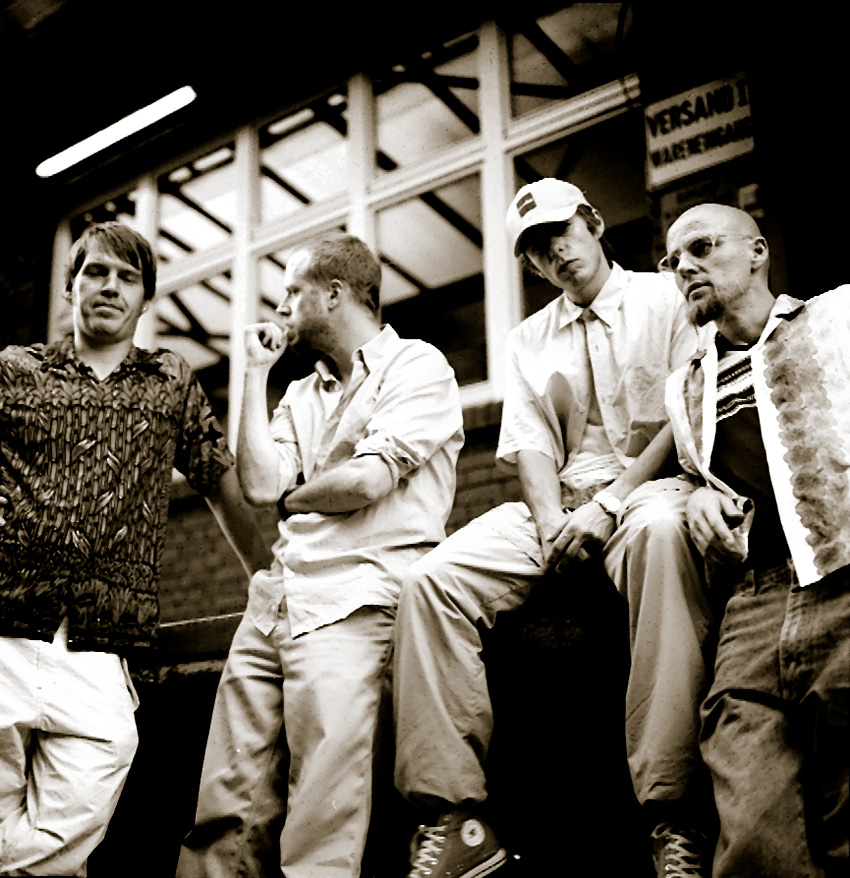
Die Fantastischen Vier in 1999

In addition to the group's works, Thomas D, Hausmarke, and Ypsilon also produced successful solo albums and the four had their own weekly show Die 4. Dimension, named after their third album, which aired on the German pay TV channel Premiere in 1993 and 1994.

At the 1996 Popkomm in Cologne, Die Fantastischen Vier announced the establishment of their label, Four Music. Headquarters were in Stuttgart, but were later moved to Berlin-Kreuzberg.

Three years later, the group's seventh album 4:99 was released on their own label, with four singles from the album following. After the No. 2 hit "MfG", three singles were released at the same time, a first in German music business. Each one can be associated with one of the rappers: "Le Smou" (Smudo), "Michi Beck in Hell" (Michi Beck), and "Buenos Dias Messias" (Thomas D).

In late September 2004, the group released the album Viel, the following tour being their most successful and best-attended to date.

In 2005, Fanta 4's first greatest-hits album was published. It includes all singles, as well as several other songs and rare footage from the group's early days, when they were still called Terminal Team and rapped in English.

On 7 April 2007, the number-one album Fornika was released, preceded by the single "Ernten was wir säen" (Reap what we sow). "Ernten was wir säen" was released as a download for Guitar Hero III: Legends of Rock in December 2007 and was covered by rock band Oomph! in 2009.

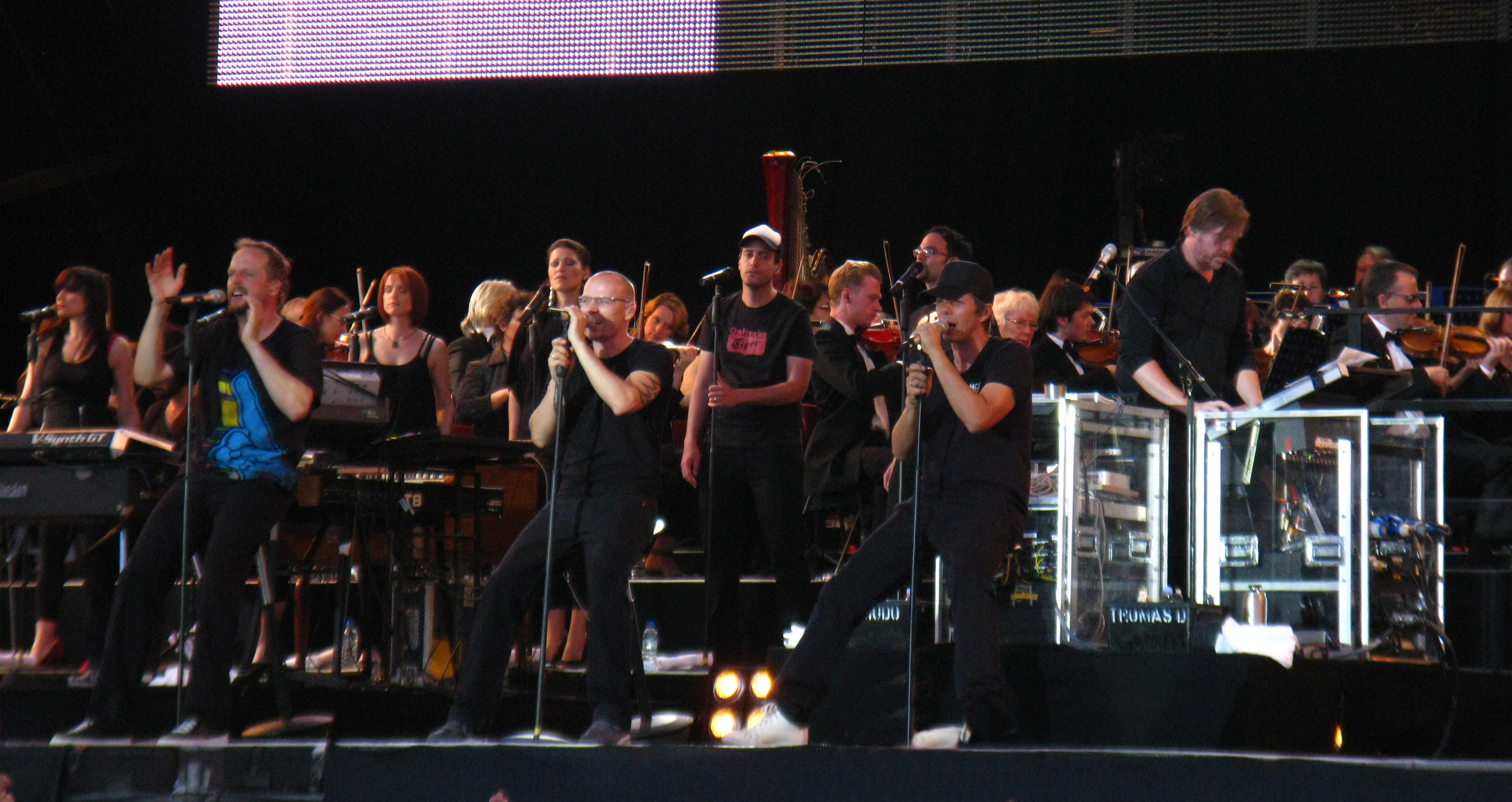
Die Fantastischen Vier at their Heimspiel ("Home Match") gig in 2009

Die Fantastischen Vier are also the German voices of the Penguins (Michael Beck as Skipper, Thomas D. as Kowalski, Andreas Rieke as Rico and Michael Bernd Schmidt as Private) in the Madagascar film series.

In 2010, Für dich immer noch Fanta Sie peaked again at number one of the German charts.

The 2014 release of the album Rekord marked the 25th anniversary of the band. It also topped the charts in Germany.

In 2018, the single "Zusammen", featuring Clueso, from the album Captain Fantastic, was chosen as the official song for the 2018 FIFA World Cup by German public broadcaster Das Erste.

== Members ==
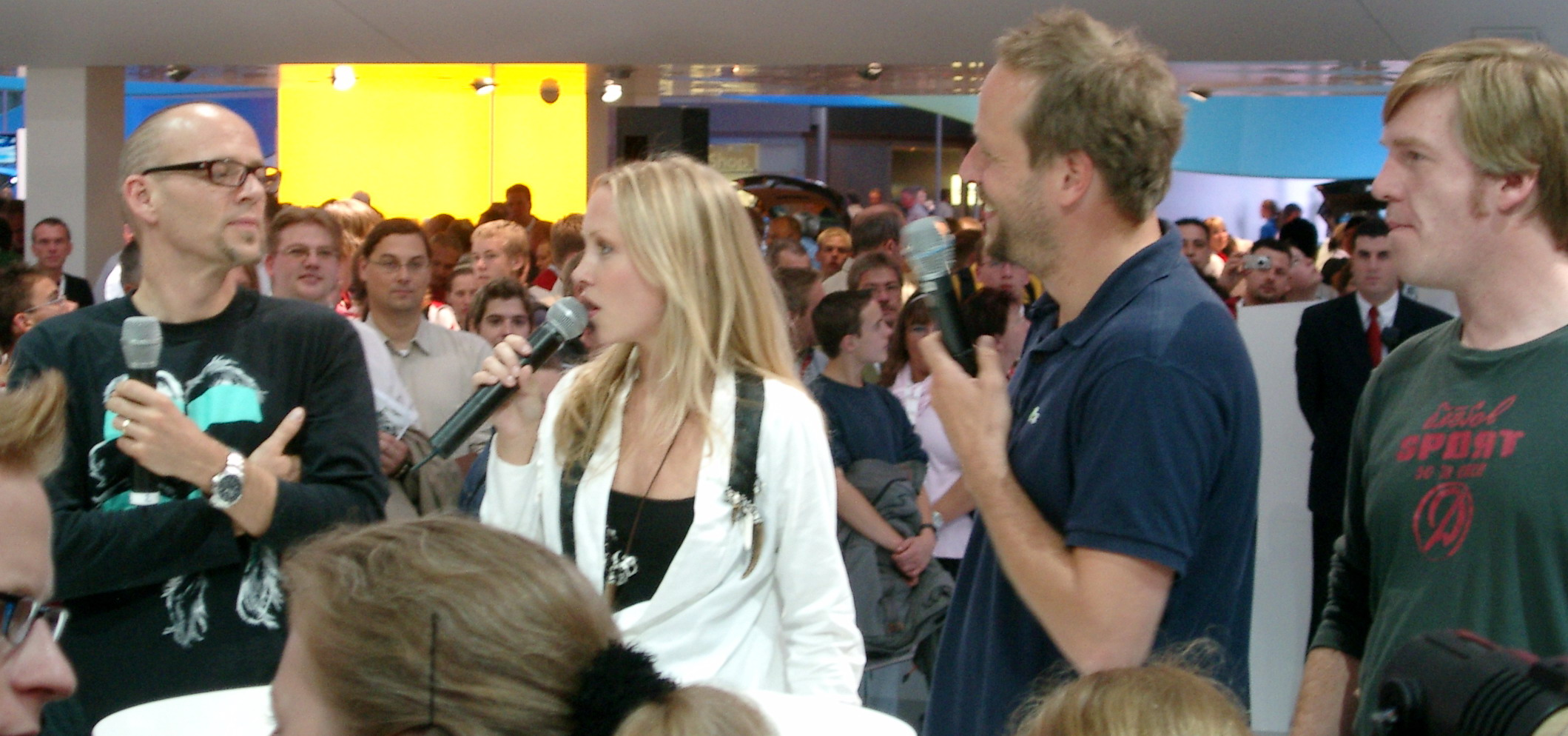
Thomas D, Smudo, and And.Ypsilon at the IAA interviewed by Janin Reinhardt

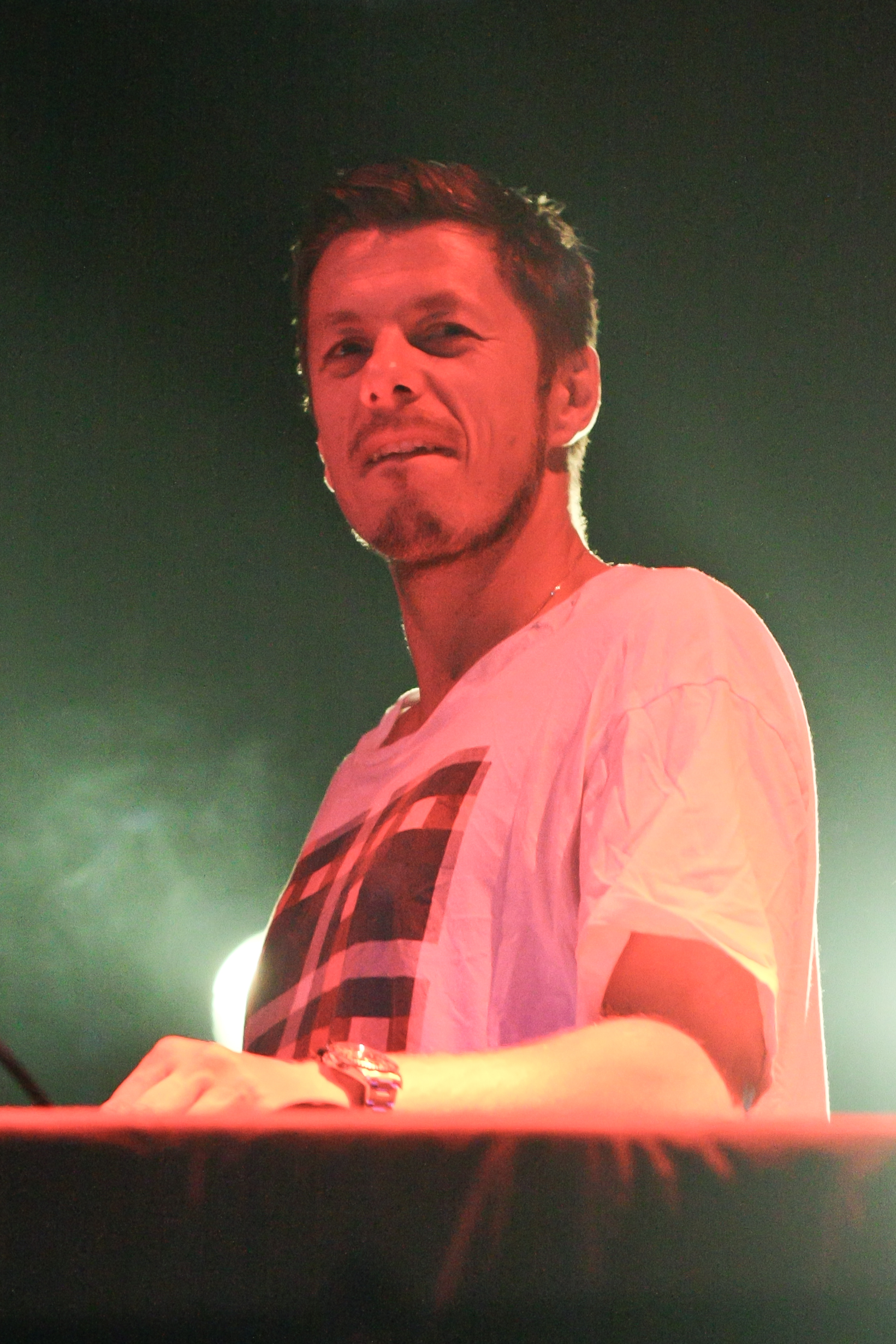
Michi Beck in 2010

- Michael "Michi" Beck – vocals, DJ
- Thomas Dürr ("Thomas D") – vocals
- Michael "Smudo" Schmidt – vocals
- Andreas "And.Ypsilon" Rieke – electronics, occasional vocals

Live members

- Markus Kössler – bass
- Florian Dauner – drums
- Lillo Scrimali – keyboards
- Roland Peil – percussion
- Markus Birkle – guitars

== Discography ==
Die Fantastischen Vier discography
- Studio albums: 10
- Live albums: 8
- Compilation albums: 2
- Singles: 40
- Collaborative albums: 1

Die Fantastischen Vier have released 10 studio albums, 2 compilation albums, 8 live albums, 40 singles and 3 as a featured artist. Die Fantastischen Vier have got 4 No. 1 albums in the GfK Top 100 Albums and a No. 1 single in the GfK Top 100 Singles. They have sold more than 4,7 million records, and their most successful album, 4 gewinnt, has sold more than 825 thousand units.

=== Albums ===
==== Studio albums ====
List of studio albums, with selected chart positions
Year	Title	Chart positions		
Year	Title	Germany	Austria	Switzerland
1991	Jetzt geht's ab!	22	—	—
1992	4 gewinnt	3	3	3
1993	Die 4. Dimension	14	23	27
1995	Lauschgift	2	10	5
1999	4:99	1	1	1
2004	Viel	2	2	4
2007	Fornika	1	4	2
2010	Für dich immer noch Fanta Sie	1	2	1
2014	Rekord	1	4	2
2018	Captain Fantastic	2	3	1
2024	Long Player	2	5	4

==== Collaborative albums ====
List of collaborative studio albums, with selected chart positions
Year	Title	Chart positions		
Year	Title	Germany	Austria	Switzerland
1994	Megavier (with Megalomaniax)	28	–	–

==== Live albums ====
List of collaborative studio albums, with selected chart positions
Year	Title	Chart positions		
Year	Title	Germany	Austria	Switzerland
1996	Live und direkt	17	—	30
2000	MTV Unplugged	6	7	18
2003	Live in Stuttgart	81	50	—
2005	Viel live	46	—	—
2008	Fornika für alle	-	-	-
2009	Heimspiel	12	54	64
2012	MTV Unplugged II	1	7	5
2015	Rekord – Live in Wien	-	-	-
2016	SuperSense Block Party	69	66	68
2022	Für Immer 30 Jahre Live	-	-	-

==== Compilation albums ====
List of compilation albums, with selected chart positions
Year	Title	Chart positions		
Year	Title	Germany	Austria	Switzerland
2005	Best of 1990–2005	26	32	29
2015	Vier und jetzt: Best of 1990–2015	6	52	22

=== Singles ===
==== As lead artist ====
List of singles as lead artist, with selected chart positions
Year	Title	Chart positions		
Year	Title	Germany	Austria	Switzerland
1991	"Mikrofonprofessor"	–	–	–
1991	"Hausmeister Thomas D."	–	–	–
1991	"Frohes Fest"	15	20	–
1992	"Die da!?"	2	1	1
1992	"Hausmeister Thomas D. '92"	–	–	–
1993	"Saft"	19	–	38
1993	"Lass die Sonne rein"	92	–	–
1993	"Zu geil für diese Welt"	22	–	20
1994	"Tag am Meer"	–	–	–
1995	"Sie ist weg"	1	16	2
1996	"Populär"	41	–	39
1996	"Nur in deinem Kopf"	81	–	–
1996	"Raus"	56	–	38
1997	"Der Picknicker"	42	–	–
1999	"MfG"	2	2	2
1999	"Le Smou"	68	–	–
1999	"Buenos Dias Messias"	87	–	–
1999	"Michi Beck in Hell"	–	–	–
2000	"Tag am Meer (Unplugged)"	67	–	–
2001	"Sie ist weg (Unplugged)"	81	50	–
2004	"Troy"	9	11	22
2004	"Sommerregen"	44	66	74
2004	"Geboren"	48	–	48
2007	"Ernten was wir säen"	12	35	25
2007	"Einfach sein"	11	13	22
2007	"Ichisichisichisich"	45	-	-
2008	"Yeah Yeah Yeah"	86	-	-
2010	"Gebt uns ruhig die Schuld (den Rest könnt ihr behalten)"	10	22	10
2010	"Danke"	36	57	56
2014	"25"	15	53	-
2014	"Und los"	53	–	71
2015	"Name drauf"(feat. Seven)	-	-	-
2017	"Endzeitstimmung"	-	-	-
2018	"Tunnel"	-	-	-
2018	"Zusammen"(feat. Clueso)	2	32	35
2018	"Hitisn"	-	-	-
2020	"Irgendwann"	-	-	-

==== As featured artist ====
List of singles as featured artist, with selected chart positions
Year	Title	Chart positions		
Year	Title	Germany	Austria	Switzerland
1993	" 100% positiv" (Die Deutsche Reimachse featuring Die Fantastischen Vier)	-	-	-
1997	"Original" (Sens Unik featuring Die Fantastischen Vier)	73	-	27
2014	"Halt dich gut fest" (Samy Deluxe featuring Die Fantastischen Vier)	-	-	-

== See also ==
- Son Goku (band)
