= David Ben =

Canadian illusionist

David Ben CM
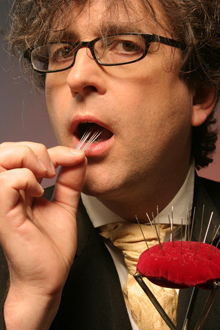
- David Ben in Tricks 2004
- Born: March 5, 1961 (age 65); Toronto, Ontario, Canada
- Education: University of Toronto (BA); University of Western Ontario (LLB); London School of Economics (LLM)
- Occupations: Magician, Keynote Speaker, writer, Magic Historian, Artistic Director
- Known for: Sleight-of-hand, magic history, magic collection, sole protégé of Ross Bertram
- Spouses: L. Jan Howlett (m. 1988; died 2013); Jessica Levman (m. 2024)
- Children: 2
- Website: David Ben

David Gordon Ben CM is a Canadian stage magician, sleight of hand artist, illusionist, author, publisher, keynote speaker, magic historian, magic consultant, magic collector and former tax lawyer.

He has been a professional magician, performer, entertainer and keynote speaker since 1990. Ben is known for his sleight-of-hand technique, his knowledge of magic history and his collection of magic.

He is one of the founders of Magicana—a performing arts organization dedicated to the study, exploration and advancement of magic as a performing art—and currently serves its as executive and artistic director. He is the sole protégé of a fellow Canadian, twentieth century sleight-of-hand artist, Ross Bertram, and biographer of celebrated magician, Dai Vernon.

== Early life and education ==
Ben was born March 5, 1961, and raised in Toronto, Ontario, Canada. His interest in magic began after receiving the book, The Stein and Day Handbook of Magic by Marvin Kaye from his father in 1973. Ben's childhood interest turned into a lifelong passion after he watched the television special Doug Henning's World of Magic (1975). Ben became a frequent visitor to the Arcade Magic and Novelty Company in Toronto, and then Morrissey Magic Ltd. While in high school, Ben worked part-time at Morrissey Magic, learning the craft from Canadian magician and store founder, Herb Morrissey.

In 1978, Ben acquired the book The Magic and Methods of Ross Bertram and in 1979, through Morrissey, Msgr. Vincent Foy and P. Howard Lyons, met the book's author, Ross Bertram. Ben studied magic with Bertram for six years (1980–86) and became Bertram's sole protégé.

Ben graduated with a BA from University College of the University of Toronto (1983), an LLB from the University of Western Ontario (1987) and an LLM from the London School of Economics (1988). He articled at the firm of Macdonald & Hayden, was called to the bar in the province of Ontario in 1989, and joined the firm of Goodman, Phillips and Vineberg (now Goodmans) as a tax lawyer.

However, in 1990, after producing a series of conventions, lectures and magic shows, Ben abandoned the conventional lawyer's life to pursue the art of magic.

In 2019, Ben was a featured alumni by the University of Toronto in a video that highlights a summary of his work and contributions to magic.

== Charity and outreach ==
In May 2000, Ben co-founded, along with broadcaster Patrick Watson and producer/director Daniel Zuckerbrot, Magicana, a not-for-profit organization (which became registered Canadian charity in 2006) dedicated to exploration and advancement of magic as a performing art.

He also assisted his wife, Jan Howlett, an accomplished educator and former Director of Public Programming and Education for the Royal Ontario Museum, and executive director of the Children's Own Museum with the formation of her own school, the Howlett Academy, an independent school (JK–Grade 8) located in Toronto. When Howlett died on July 14, 2013, from complications due to brain cancer, Ben assumed the role of director for the Howlett Academy.

In 2004, Ben developed My Magic Hands, an outreach program designed to teach creativity and develop self-confidence and self-esteem in disadvantaged youth through the medium of magic. The program received a significant pilot funding in 2005 followed by a subsequent multi-year funding grant from the Ontario Trillium Foundation (2006–2008).

In 2005, inspired by his friend the late Tom Kneebone and the Smile Theatre Company, Ben created Senior Sorcery, a program designed to bring magic shows to immobile seniors, the goal being to create intergenerational opportunities for the old to invite the young to share the experience of magic.

In 2009, Ben acquired the collection of late Canadian magic icon, Sid Lorraine, adding it to his already considerable magic holdings. Ben's holdings also include the collection of Stewart James, Willis Kenney, David Drake, Bruce Posgate, and items belonging to Dai Vernon. Ben developed a number of online exhibitions for Magicana including Ross Bertram, Master Magician 2010; Sid Lorraine: The Magical Chatterbox 2009; The Life & Magic of Stewart James 2007 (in collaboration with PhD student Joe Culpepper); Postcards of Magicians 2005, 2010; and Bert Douglas: A Family Remembers 2005, 2010).

In 2024, the Lilly Library, Indiana University acquired part of Ben’s collection of books, periodicals, ephemera, notebooks and personal papers related to magic.

== Theatre ==
=== The Conjuror (1996, 1997, 1998, 2002, 2014) ===
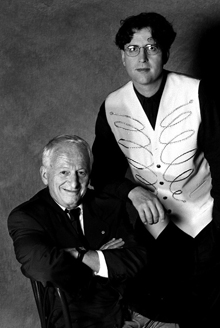
Patrick Watson and David Ben 1996 promotional photo for The Conjuror for the Shaw Festival

The Conjuror was a theatrical recreation of a performance by a celebrated (but fictitious) Canadian conjuror at St. George's Hall in London circa 1909. The play was developed by Ben and Canadian broadcasting icon, Patrick Watson, after a chance encounter between the two at the home of Canadian media mogul and magic aficionado Allan Slaight.

The Conjuror, with set and costumes by Kelly Wolf, had its world premiere at the Shaw Festival in 1996. The show had outstanding box office and critical reviews. Christopher Newton, Artistic Director of the Shaw Festival, "dip[ped] his imagination in the Golden Age of Magic" and invited Ben and Watson to revisit The Conjuror the following season. The Conjuror – Part 2, with set design by William Schmuck and lighting by Bonnie Beecher, had its world premiere at the Shaw Festival in 1997 featuring "seven illusions accomplished with panache". At the end of the season, Ben and Watson amalgamated The Conjuror and The Conjuror – Part 2 into The Compleat Conjuror for a special gala fundraising performance for the Festival.

While Ben and Watson were developing The Conjuror, Ben became reacquainted with Daniel Zuckerbrot. Zuckerbrot, a documentary filmmaker, retained Ben to levitate David Suzuki, the host of The Nature of Things, for a Zuckerbrot film "Martin Gardner: Mathemagician" (1995). Zuckerbrot proposed recording the development of The Conjuror. The result was "A Conjuror in the Making" (1997), which aired on the Adrienne Clarkson Presents on the CBC and on Breakfast with the Arts on the A&E Network in the United States. The film follows magician David Ben and director Patrick Watson through rehearsal, show development and finally to the opening night performance at the Shaw Festival. The documentary won gold at WorldFest-Houston International Film Festival, and the Chris Statuette at the Columbus International Film & Video Festival.

In 1997, Lindsay Sharp, then Director of the Royal Ontario Museum, invited Ben to stage The Conjuror at the ROM. Ben and his team refurbished the theatre in the Museum – a theatre that had been dormant for theatrical productions for 35 years. A 90-minute version of The Conjuror opened in December 1997 at Theatre ROM and ran for four months. It then embarked on a regional theatre tour of Ontario in the summer of 1998 "deftly conjuring [a] charming show".

The play was remounted to continued acclaim in Toronto in 2002, now with original music by John Lang, and ran for six weeks.

The Conjuror was remounted in December 2014 for a limited-engagement of 12 shows for six days for Soulpepper Theatre.

=== The Conjuror's Suite (1999, 2000) ===
In 1999, Ben and Watson created a new 90-minute show—The Conjuror's Suite—an exploration of parlor magic inspired by the work of Jean Eugène Robert-Houdin, Johann Nepomuk Hofzinser and Max Malini. With Ed Kotanen's design and Bonnie Beecher's lighting, Ben and Watson created a three-quarter surround theatre in the Garfield Weston Exhibition Hall at the Royal Ontario Museum for the show. The Conjuror's Suite received critical acclaim, and Ben was invited to restage the work by Curtis Barlow at the Charlottetown Festival in Prince Edward Island for the summer of 2000.

=== Tricks (2004, 2015) ===
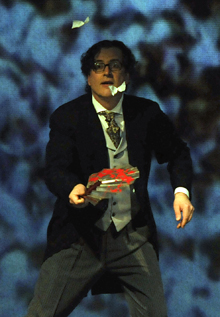
David Ben animates two butterflies in Natural Magick part of the 2011 Luminato Festival

Collaborating again with Watson, Ben wrote a new theatrical work, Tricks—a post-modern show focusing on the classics of magic. He returned to the stage with critical success. Designer credits: set design by David Rayfield, lighting by Bonnie Beecher and an original score by John Lang. The work was presented in 2004 at Artword Theatre (Toronto) in collaboration with Magicana. Tricks was remounted in December 2015 for a limited-engagement for Soulpepper Theatre.

=== Natural Magick (2011) ===
In 2011, Ben mounted a new show, Natural Magick which was produced by Magicana in collaboration with the Luminato Festival. This show was inspired by John Baptista della Porta's 1558 scientific treatise, "Natural Magick", Shahrazad's tales, Kenneth Burke's A Grammar of Motives and the modern notions of magic as espoused by master magician, Dai Vernon. The new work featured a set by David Rayfield and multimedia imagery by Cameron Davis, lighting by Bonnie Beecher and music by John Lang. Ben presented new sleight-of-hand pieces from his repertoire and received critical acclaim for his work. Natural Magick was a top pick for the Festival. Natural Magick was presented as part of the Master of Magic series for Luminato at the Tarragon Theatre (Toronto).

=== Card Table Artifice (2014) ===
In 2014, Ben wrote, performed and directed, Card Table Artifice which was produced by Magicana in collaboration with the Luminato Festival. The show was a new work based on A Man in a Room, Gambling, originally created by Gavin Bryars and Juan Muñoz. The 2014 presentation was a performance art piece with three areas of the stage occupied with Ben performing live, sleight-of-hand gambling technique, Bryars leading a string quartet and a narrator, Canadian actor, RH Thompson, reading passages which described the technique displayed by Ben on a large video screen behind the performers. There were two performances, June 13 and 14, 2014 which received warm reviews.

=== Hocus Pocus (2016) ===
In 2016, Ben wrote, performed and directed, Hocus Pocus which was produced by Magicana in collaboration with Soulpepper Theatre. In addition to his sleight-of-hand, Ben incorporated cinematic clips as well as video and voice-over work by spoken word artist La-Vane Kelly to forge a connection between magic words and the art of spoken word. Hocus Pocus ran in December 2016 for a limited-engagement at Soulpepper Theatre, and received warm reviews.

== Producer ==
Ben produced a number of magic conventions, lectures and magic shows including NYCAN '83 (convention), a gathering of 300 magicians. In the same year, he also became one of the first to produce Penn & Teller in their two-man show at the Ritz Theatre in Toronto.

In 2003, Ben started producing through Magicana, and in association with Allan Slaight, a conference called 31 Faces North in which he and Slaight invited thirty-one of the world's foremost experts and practitioners of magic and promising young magicians to participate in a four-day think-tank of magic. The attendees represented a who's who of magic including Guest of Honours: Jay Marshall (2003), Tommy Wonder (2003), Johnny Thompson (2004), Harry Riser (2004), Billy McComb (2005), Charles Reynolds (2005), Max Maven (2006), Bob White (2006), Roberto Giobbi (2007), Stephen Minch (2007), Ton Onosaka (2008), Herb Zarrow (2008), Michael Weber (2009), Bob Sheets (2009), Gaëtan Bloom (2010) and Jim Steinmeyer (2010). Filmmaker, Daniel Zuckerbrot recorded each session, all of which is now housed in the archives of Magicana.

In 2009 Ben became Director of the Magic Collectors Association, publisher and editor of its journal, Magicol and the convention chair for the annual gathering, the Magic Collectors Weekend. 2010 marked the 41st conference. Ben served as producer and Convention Chair of that event through 2017.

In 2010, Ben was invited to program and produce the Masters of Magic series for Luminato, a festival of creativity and the arts held in Toronto. For Luminato 2010, he produced magicians Bob Sheets, The Mac King Comedy Show, Max Maven's Thinking in Person, and North American theatrical premiere of Spain's Juan Tamariz at the Panasonic Theatre.

In 2011 Ben was again called upon by Luminato to curate magic for the Festival. He produced three shows: Toast of the Town (Eric Mead), Natural Magick and Vodvil. While Natural Magick featured magic performed by David Ben, Vodvil involved five magic acts by artists of international acclaim – namely, The Great Tomsoni & Company (John and Pam Thompson), Mike Caveney, Tina Lenert, Ardan James and Gaëtan Bloom (of France). "Vodvil" was presented in the historic Winter Garden Theatre in Toronto keeping in step with the vaudevillian theme of the show.

In 2012 Ben produced, in association with Magicana, three new programs for Luminato. The first was The Alpha Project by the mentalist, Banachek; The Cheat by Richard Turner; and From The Dark by Chilean magician Juan Esteban Varela.

In 2013 Ben also produced in association with Magicana, three more programs for Luminato: Concerto for Piano & Pasteboards by Spanish magician, Miguel Puga; Chamber Magic by Steve Cohen; and Compositions by magician Rafael Benatar. In addition to producing these live performances, Ben produced in association with Magicana and Reel Time Images, a film The Devil's Playthings, a short, fantasy film mixing cinema and sleight-of-hand.

For 2014, Ben again produced (in association with Magicana), two programs for Luminato themed as Transgressive Magic. The first was Bullet Catch a magic/performance art show written and performed by Scottish performer, Rob Drummond, about the (fictional) case of William Henderson, a magician apparently killed in front of 2,000 people while performing the famed bullet catch in 1912. The second was Card Table Artifice written by David Ben and composed by Gavin Bryars and presented as a performance art piece with the simultaneous presentation of Ben performing card table artistry, Bryars leading a string quartet and narration by Canadian actor, RH Thomson. The show also included an opening act by magician, Rob Zabrecky.

== Consultant ==
Ben served as the Magic Consultant in a number of areas including:

- Theatre: The Grand Magic (2023), The Lion, The Witch and the Wardrobe (2016), Possible Worlds (2015), The Scarlet Pimpernel (2002) for Stratford Theatre; Sisters (2018), Rosencrantz and Guildenstern Are Dead (2015),Of Human Bondage (2014), Travesties (2009), School for Wives (2000) for Soulpepper Theatre; Ragtime (2012), One Touch of Venus (2010) for The Shaw Festival; The Darkest Dark (2023), Merlin (2002) for Lorraine Kimsa Theatre for Young People; The Wizard of Oz (2011) for Ross Petty Productions; Piff Paff Poof (2011) for Magicana; Living in Las Vegas, Live at the Rio (2009) for Penn & Teller.
- Museum/Culture: Facilitated the acquisition of one of the top five magic poster and Houdiniana collections in the word (renamed The Allan Slaight Collection) in 2015 for the McCord Museum in Montreal.Illusions: The Art of Magic (2017) co-curator of the exhibition originally mounted at the McCord Museum in Montreal. Ben also consulted for the remount of the Illusions exhibition in 2020 at the Art Gallery of Ontario
- Movies: Kit Kittredge: An American Girl (2008); The Devil's Playthings (Short) (2013)
- Television: Canada's Walk of Fame – Doug Henning induction (2010); Murdoch Mysteries (2009)
- Documentaries: "The Wizards of Awe" (1992) for CBC's The Journal; "Martin Gardner Mathemagician" (1996) for CBC's The Nature of Things; "Dai Vernon—The Spirit of Magic" (1999); "Heroes of Magic" (2000) for Thames Television; "The Last Illusion" (2005) for Markham Cook; "The Strange Genius of Stewart James" (2006) for History Television's The Canadians – Biographies of a Nation; "The Science of Magic" (2018) for CBC's The Nature of Things.
- Commercials: Tim Hortons, Coolpix
- Short films: Yes/No (2010) by Brian Johnson inspired by the poems of Dennis Lee
- Literature: Divisadero (2007) by Michael Ondaatje

== Keynote speaker ==
In 1990, in addition to performing magic at corporate functions, Ben started speaking about creativity, innovation and problem-solving using the metaphor of magic to a wide range of businesses and associations in Canada and the United States.

His work in this field led to his book on the subject, Advantage Play, published by Key Porter Books in 2002 (now published by Magicana).

Ben has also been a keynote speaker for the magic community providing lectures for private groups and conventions since 1985. He has been sought out to speak as an expert on sleight-of-hand magic and as a historian of magic, including unique lecture topics for The Ibidem Event (1985); the Society of American Magicians 100th Anniversary Convention in New York City (2002); the combined Society of American Magicians and International Brotherhood of Magicians conference in Louisville (2008); and multiple appearances in Hakone, Japan.

== Awards and achievements ==
Ben has received numerous awards and recognition for his achievements in magic including:

- Member of The Inner Magic Circle with Gold Star, elevated to Gold Star in 2000
- The 2013 Masters Award from the Milbourne Christopher Foundation
- The 2018 Media and Literary Fellowship Award (a co-recipient) from the Academy of Magical Arts (The Magic Castle)
- Order of Canada (2024)

== Writer, biographer and editor ==
Ben is the author of:

- 2002: Advantage Play: The Manager's Guide To Creative Problem Solving, Toronto: Key Porter Books. ISBN 978-1-55263-349-6
- 2003: Tricks, Chicago: Squash Publishing. ISBN 978-0-97446-810-5
- 2006: Dai Vernon: A Biography – Artist, Magician, Muse Vol. 1, Chicago: Squash Publishing. Toronto: Magicana. ISBN 978-0-9744681-5-0
- 2008: Zarrow: A Lifetime of Magic, New Jersey: Meir Yedid Magic. ISBN 978-0-9819166-1-3
- 2011: "Extraordinary Popular Delusions and the Madness of Erdnase." Magicol, A Journal of Magic History and Collectibles No. 180 (2011): 24–43. Print.
- 2012: "Max Malini: Bigger Than Life" Genii (October 2012): 44–67. ISSN 0016-6855 Print.
- 2013: Slaight: Off Hand, The astonishing journey of media mogul Allan Slaight, Toronto: Magicana. ISBN 978-0-9878686-1-9 Print.
- 2014: "Paul Fox, Master of Mystery" Magicol, A Journal of Magic History and Collectibles No. 188 (2014): 4-119. Print.
- 2014: Card Table Artifice (play; performance art on card cheating)
- 2015: The Experts at the Card Table, Toronto: Magicana. ISBN 978-0-9878686-3-3 Print.
- 2017: "Constellations of Magic" Magicol, A Journal of Magic History and Collectibles No. 192 (2017): 22-36 . Print.
- 2022: Dai Vernon: The Spirit of Magic. Special presentation booklet for FISM 2022. Print.

Ben is the co-author with Patrick Watson of:

- 1996: The Conjuror (play; based on a fictitious Canadian magician set in 1909)
- 1999: The Conjuror's Suite (play; based on Edwardian magician performing a salon magic show)
- 2004: Tricks (play; based on a modern-day magician)
- 2011: Natural Magick (play; exploring magic as a theatrical art)

Ben has edited various works including:

- 2018: The Magic of Johnny Thompson Toronto: Magicana. ISBN 978-0-9878686-6-4 (set) Print.

As a writer, Ben is represented by Westwood Creative Artists.

== Publisher ==
Ben, in partnership with Magicana, is the publisher and editor of:

- 2007: The Essential Stewart James by Stewart James. Toronto: Magicana. ISBN 978-0-9780675-2-6
- 2008: Spins and Needles: The Magic of Allan Slaight by Allan Slaight. Toronto: Magicana. ISBN 978-0-9780675-3-3
- 2008: How Gamblers Win by a Retired Professional. Toronto: Magicana. ISBN 978-0-9780675-4-0
- 2010: A Grand Expose of The Science of Gambling by An Adept. Toronto: Magicana. ISBN 978-0-9780675-8-8
- 2011: A Cut Above by Msgr Vincent Foy. Toronto: Magicana. ISBN 978-0-9780675-9-5
- 2012: Erdnase Unmasked by Ben, David et al. Toronto: Magicana. ISBN 978-0-9878686-0-2
- 2013: Slaight, Off Hand: The astonishing journey of media mogul Allan Slaight by David Ben. Toronto: Magicana. ISBN 978-0-9878686-1-9
- 2015: The Bammo Ten Card Deal Dossier by Bob Farmer. Toronto: Magicana. ISBN 978-0-9878686-4-0 Print.
- 2015: The Experts at the Card Table, Toronto: Magicana. ISBN 978-0-9878686-3-3 Print.
- 2018: The Magic of Johnny Thompson Toronto: Magicana. ISBN 978-0-9878686-6-4 (set) Print.

He was the publisher and editor of Magicol (ISSN 0460-5314) from 2010 to 2022, a journal on magic history and collectibles that has been published since 1950.
