= Magicana =

- Formation: May 2000
- Type: Theatre group
- Purpose: Magic, performing art
- Location: Toronto
- Artistic director: David Ben
- Website: Magicana

Magicana is a Canadian federally incorporated not-for-profit arts organization dedicated to the study, exploration and advancement of magic as a performing art. Magicana is governed by a volunteer board of directors. Julie Eng serves as Magicana's executive director and David Ben as its artistic director.

== History ==
Magicana was founded in May 2000 by magician David Ben, Canadian broadcasting icon Patrick Watson, and documentary filmmaker Daniel Zuckerbrot. Magicana is funded by donations from private foundations and individuals; and from the sales of tickets and publications on a cost recovery basis.

Magicana received official status as a registered charitable organization in 2006.

In February 2025, Magicana failed to renew its domain name and it was taken over by a Thai gaming/gambling website.

== Objectives ==
The purpose of Magicana as stated in its Articles of Incorporation is:

(a) to educate and increase the public’s understanding and appreciation of the art of magic by providing performances of an artistic nature in public venues;
(b) to provide instructional seminars on topics related to the art of magic;
(c) to stage and produce exhibitions for the purpose of educating and advancing the public’s appreciation of the art of magic; and
(d) to educate artists through participation in such performances and exhibitions and related workshops.

== Board of directors ==
Chairman Emeritus: Patrick Watson

Chairman: Tim Jackson

Board of Directors:

- Michael Gillis
- Craig MacPherson
- Michael McLaughlin
- Kevin Rusli
- Bob Weeks
- Ingrid van Weert

== Productions ==
Magicana has produced a number of theatrical public performances on magic including:

- The Conjuror’s Suite (2000) - The play - an exploration of parlor magic inspired by the work of Jean Eugène Robert-Houdin, Johann Nepomuk Hofzinser and Max Malini - was originally mounted in 1999 at the Garfield Weston Exhibition Hall of the Royal Ontario Museum in Toronto. The show was remounted at the Confederation Centre for the Charlottetown Festival in Prince Edward Island for the summer season of 2000.
- The Conjuror (2002) - The show - a theatrical recreation of a performance by a celebrated (but fictitious) Canadian conjuror at St. George's Hall in London circa 1909 - was remounted in Toronto at the Isabelle Bader Theatre and ran for six weeks to critical acclaim.
- Tricks (2004) - Differing from its predecessors, Tricks - a post-modern show of classical magic - was designed as an intimate and interactive show involving a high degree of audience participation. The play was presented for four weeks at the Artword Theatre in Toronto.

Juan Tamariz performing at the Panasonic Theatre in Toronto as part of the Masters of Magic series of Luminato, June 2010

- Max Maven: Thinking in Person (2006) at the Al Green Theatre (Toronto) - Magicana invited Max Maven to present his one-man show for a limited, two-night engagement in August 2006.
- Luminato 2010 Masters of Magic series featuring: Juan Tamariz of Spain, Mac King from Las Vegas, Max Maven from Hollywood were presented at the Panasonic Theatre (Toronto); and Bob Sheets from Washington, DC performed in various Festival (free) venues around Toronto.
- Luminato 2011 Masters of Magic series featuring: Eric Mead in Toast of the Town, David Ben in Natural Magick at the Tarragon Theatre in Toronto; and The Great Tomsoni & Co (Johnny and Pam Thompson), Mike Caveney, Tina Lenert, Ardan James, Gaëtan Bloom in Vodavil at the historic vaudeville Winter Garden Theatre in Toronto.
- Piff Paff Poof (2011) at the Lower Ossington Theatre (Toronto) - Magicana presented this new work for children to invite them to experience live theatre with their families. The show ran for the month of March 2011.
- Luminato 2012 Mind Over Matter magic series (from June 8 to 17) featuring: Banachek in the world-premier of The Alpha Project at the Fleck Dance Theatre (Toronto), Richard Turner in The Cheat at the TIFF Bell Lightbox (Toronto); and Juan Esteban Varela from Chile in the Canadian premier of From The Dark at Hart House Theatre (Toronto).
- Luminato 2013Maestros of Magic featured three magicians. From June 14 to 16 MagoMigue aka Miguel Puga of Granada, Spain presented his show in four performances, with fellow Granadina pianist, Paz Sabater, Concerto for Piano & Pasteboards at Mazzoleni Concert Hall, Royal Conservatory of Music, merging "music and illusion a crowd-pleasing show". From June 17 to 19 New York City native, Steve Cohen presented six performances of his show, Chamber Magic. Cohen's ninety-minute performance was well-received and considered a festival highlight. On the closing weekend, Rafael Benatar presented, Compositions, for three performances at the Royal Conservatory of Music, blending Baroque music played by Benatar on an 18th-century lute and guitar, with modern-day magic performances.

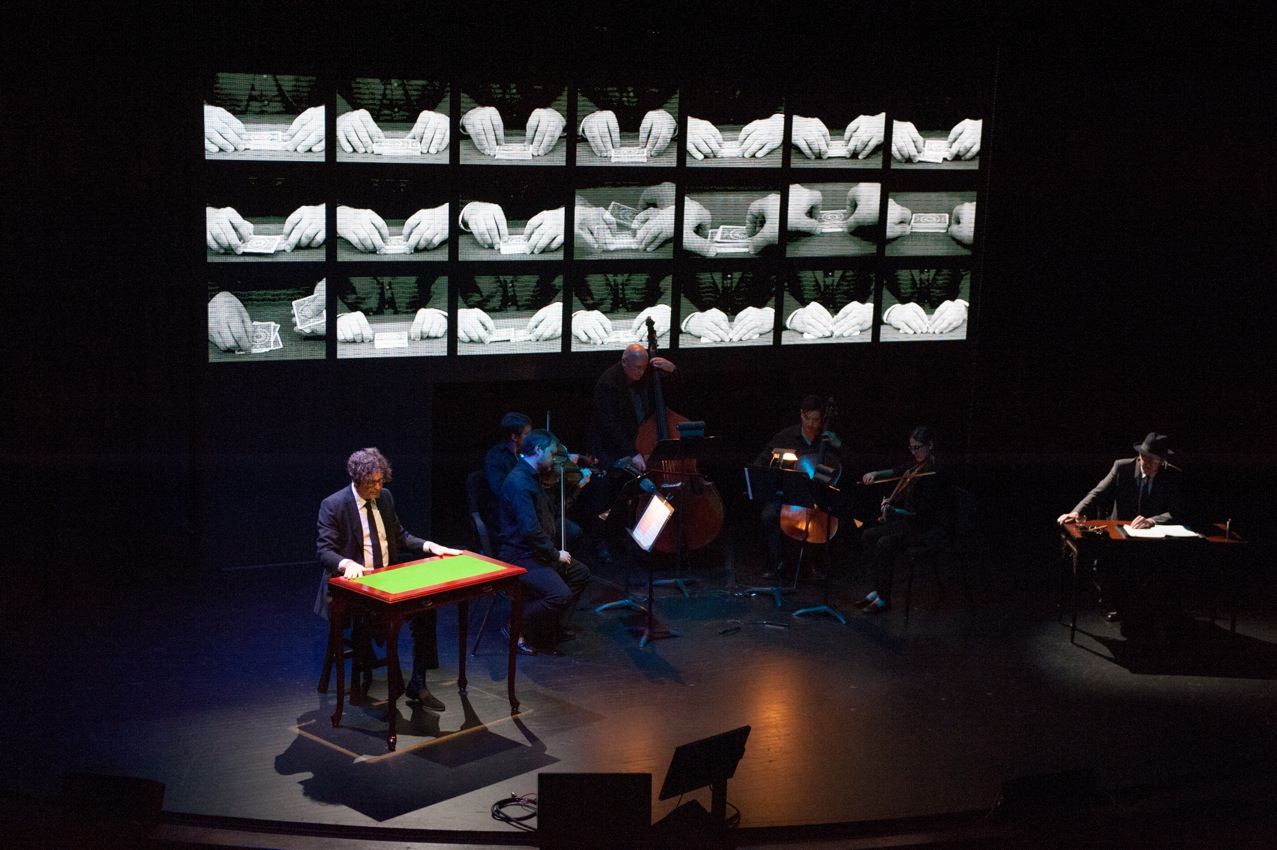
Card Table Artifice presented at the Jane Mallet Theatre in Toronto as part of the Transgressive Magic series of Luminato, June 2014

- Luminato 2014 Magicana presented Transgressive Magic, or magic that "violates a law, command, or moral code". The program featured two shows. The first was the world premiere of Card Table Artifice a unique magic, music and narrative collaboration with music written by composer Gavin Bryars and the book written by David Ben. Originally inspired by Bryar's first collaboration, A Man in a Room, Gambling, with artist and sculptor Juan Muñoz, the show had three simultaneous elements: Ben performing sleight-of-hand using technique from the seminal text for magicians, The Expert at the Card Table; while the string quartet, Art of Time Ensemble accompanied by Bryars, played ten string arrangements by Bryars; as actor, RH Thomson narrated passages from The Expert at the Card Table accompanying the music and matching the magic. The production also featured Rob Zabrecky's TURN ON THE DARK! which opened the show. The second show was the Canadian premiere of Bullet Catch, written and performed by Rob Drummond. The play featured a live bullet catch demonstration while presenting a period play about fictional character, William Wonder.
- The Conjuror 2014 at Soulpepper Theatre was remounted and presented at the Baillie Theatre for a limited-time engagement of 12 shows from Dec 30, 2014 to Jan 4, 2015.

== Exhibitions ==
Online exhibitions on magic and great magicians of yesteryear, developed, hosted and maintained by Magicana include:

- The Oldest Trick in the Book, An exhibition on the Cups & Balls
- Everything Erdnase
- Ross Bertram: Master Magician
- Sid Lorraine: The Magical Chatterbox
- The Life & Magic of Stewart James
- Postcards of Magic: The Msgr. Foy Collection
- Bert Douglas: A Family Remembers

Magicana facilitated the acquisition of one of the top five Golden Age magic poster collections in the world and one of the most important Houdiniana collections (renamed, the Allan Slaight Collection) for the McCord Museum in February 2015. The $3 million collection contains 600 vintage posters and hundreds of Houdini-related books, posters, unique collectibles and ephemera making it the largest magic collection in Canada, and is housed in Montreal.

== Conferences, seminars and workshops ==
Magicana has hosted a number of artist workshops and seminars by several top-rated magicians and speakers across Canada including:

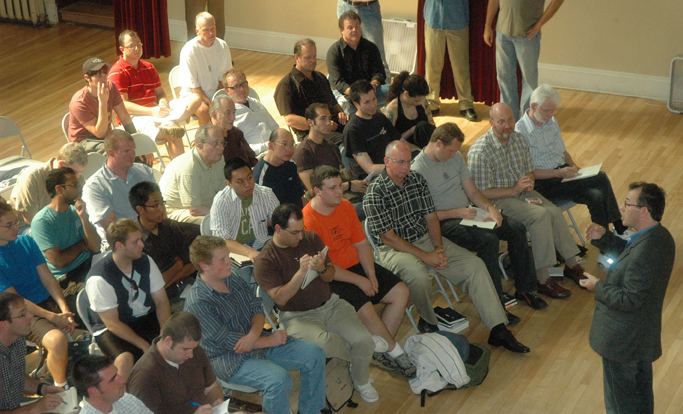
Eric Mead lecturing for magic enthusiasts in Toronto, August 2008

Norman Beck	Rafael Benatar	Gaëtan Bloom
Eugene Burger	John Carney	Jason England
Roberto Giobbi	Kostya Kimlat	Max Maven
Eric Mead	John Mendoza	Patrick Page
David Solomon	Jim Steinmeyer	Jamy Ian Swiss
John Thompson	Richard Turner

=== 31 Faces North ===
From 2003 to 2010 Magicana hosted 31 Faces North, a four-day think-tank of thirty-one of the world's foremost magicians. The invitational conference was designed to bring sleight-of-hand experts, magic historians, and magic experts together to network, share, discuss and witness magic performances by masters of the art.

While the conference recognized giants of the magic community, it was also designed to offer promising young magicians a chance to meet and learn from magic legends. The attendees represented a who's who of magic including Guests of Honour:

- Jay Marshall (2003)
- Tommy Wonder (2003)
- Johnny Thompson (2004)
- Harry Riser (2004)
- Billy McComb (2005)
- Charles Reynolds (2005)
- Max Maven (2006)
- Bob White (2006)
- Roberto Giobbi (2007)
- Stephen Minch (2007)
- Ton Onosaka (2008)
- Herb Zarrow (2008)
- Michael Weber (2009)
- Bob Sheets (2009)
- Gaëtan Bloom (2010)
- Jim Steinmeyer (2010)
- Allan Slaight (2013)

=== Magic Collectors Weekend ===
Since 2010, Magicana has been responsible for the programming, administration and execution of the Magic Collectors Weekend - an international conference on magic history for 200 participants held in Chicago. The MCW has been staged annually since 1969. As of 2012, the MCW is staged on a biennial schedule.

== Publications ==
Magicana's publications include:

- 2006: Dai Vernon: A Biography – Artist, Magician, Muse Vol. 1, Chicago: Squash Publishing. Toronto: Magicana. ISBN 978-0-9744681-5-0
- 2007: The Essential Stewart James by Stewart James. Toronto: Magicana. ISBN 978-0-9780675-2-6
- 2008: Spins and Needles: The Magic of Allan Slaight by Allan Slaight. Toronto: Magicana. ISBN 978-0-9780675-3-3
- 2008: How Gamblers Win by a Retired Professional. Toronto: Magicana. ISBN 978-0-9780675-4-0
- 2010: A Grand Expose of The Science of Gambling by An Adept. Toronto: Magicana ISBN 978-0-9780675-8-8
- 2011: A Cut Above by Msgr Vincent Foy, Toronto: Magicana ISBN 978-0-9780675-9-5
- 2011: Erdnase Unmasked by: David Ben, Jason England, Martin Gardner, Richard Hatch, Hurt McDermott. Toronto: Magicana ISBN 978-0-9878686-0-2
- 2013: Slaight, Off Hand: The astonishing journey of media mogul Allan Slaight by David Ben. Toronto: Magicana. ISBN 978-0-9878686-1-9
- 2014: "Paul Fox, Master of Mystery" Magicol, A Journal of Magic History and Collectibles No. 188 (2014): 4–119. Print.
- 2015: The Bammo Ten Card Deal Dossier by Bob Farmer. Toronto: Magicana ISBN 978-0-9878686-4-0
- 2015: The Experts at the Card Table by David Ben and E.S. Andrews. Toronto: Magicana ISBN 978-0-9878686-3-3
- 2019: The Magic of Johnny Thompson by Jamy Ian Swiss and Johnny Thompson. Toronto: Magicana ISBN 978-0-9878686-6-4 (set)

Magicana also publishes Magicol (ISSN 0460-5314), a quarterly journal on magic history and collectibles which has been in publication since 1950. Magicana began publication stewardship of Magicol in 2010 starting with issue No. 174.

== Scholarships and grants ==
Magicana provides grants and bursaries related to the study of magic.

- The Tony Eng Youth Fund was developed in memory of the late Canadian magician Tony Eng. The TEYF provides financial assistance for young magicians (ages 13 to 18) to attend lectures, conferences, workshops, or acquire books or apparatus related to the performance of magic.
- The Edwin A. Dawes Award for Magic Scholarship is a bursary designed to provide doctoral students financial assistance toward the cost of materials and research pertaining a thesis related to the art of magic.
- The Allan Slaight Awards. On April 20, 2015, Magicana announced the Allan Slaight Awards, a prize to "recognize outstanding achievement in the pursuit of the impossible" where $250,000 CDN ($50,000 per year for five years) is distributed across five categories: Sharing Wonder ($10,000), Sharing Secrets ($15,000), International Rising Star ($5,000), Canadian Rising Star ($5,000), and Lifetime Achievement ($15,000). International in scope, Magicana accepts submissions from performers, creators, writers, designers, and anyone else with an interest in magic, wherever they reside or perform. A panel of three independent judges review the "Long List" in each category, and reduce the list to a "Short List" of potential recipients. The judges will then determine a final recipient in each category and winners are announced annually. The inaugural recipients (for work completed in 2014) will be announced in Toronto on June 27, 2015.

== Community programs ==
Magicana developed and runs two, community outreach programs: My Magic Hands and Senior Sorcery.

=== My Magic Hands ===
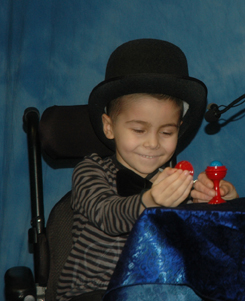
Client from Holland Bloorview performing at The Big Show, June 2011

My Magic Hands, originally launched in 2005, uses the art of magic as a teaching vehicle to reach children in disadvantaged communities in order to build self-confidence and essential life skills such as communication, critical thinking and problem solving. Using the theatrical process involved in staging a magic trick, the program provides a cost-efficient and systematic way for children to learn about the arts in communities that do not normally have access to quality arts-related programming. Magicana received seed funding in 2005 followed by a multi-year grant (2006–2008) from the Ontario Trillium Foundation for the program and continues to currently operate through funding from private foundations and donors.

In addition to outreach programming, My Magic Hands is also a longstanding program staple at Holland Bloorview Kids Rehabilitation Hospital, specifically in occupational and speech therapy programs. The program is recognized and acknowledged by occupational therapists, staff and parents of clients as a unique, successful and motivating tool assisting clients to reach their therapeutic goals.

The program is administrated by Magicana and is a core activity of the organization.

=== Senior Sorcery ===
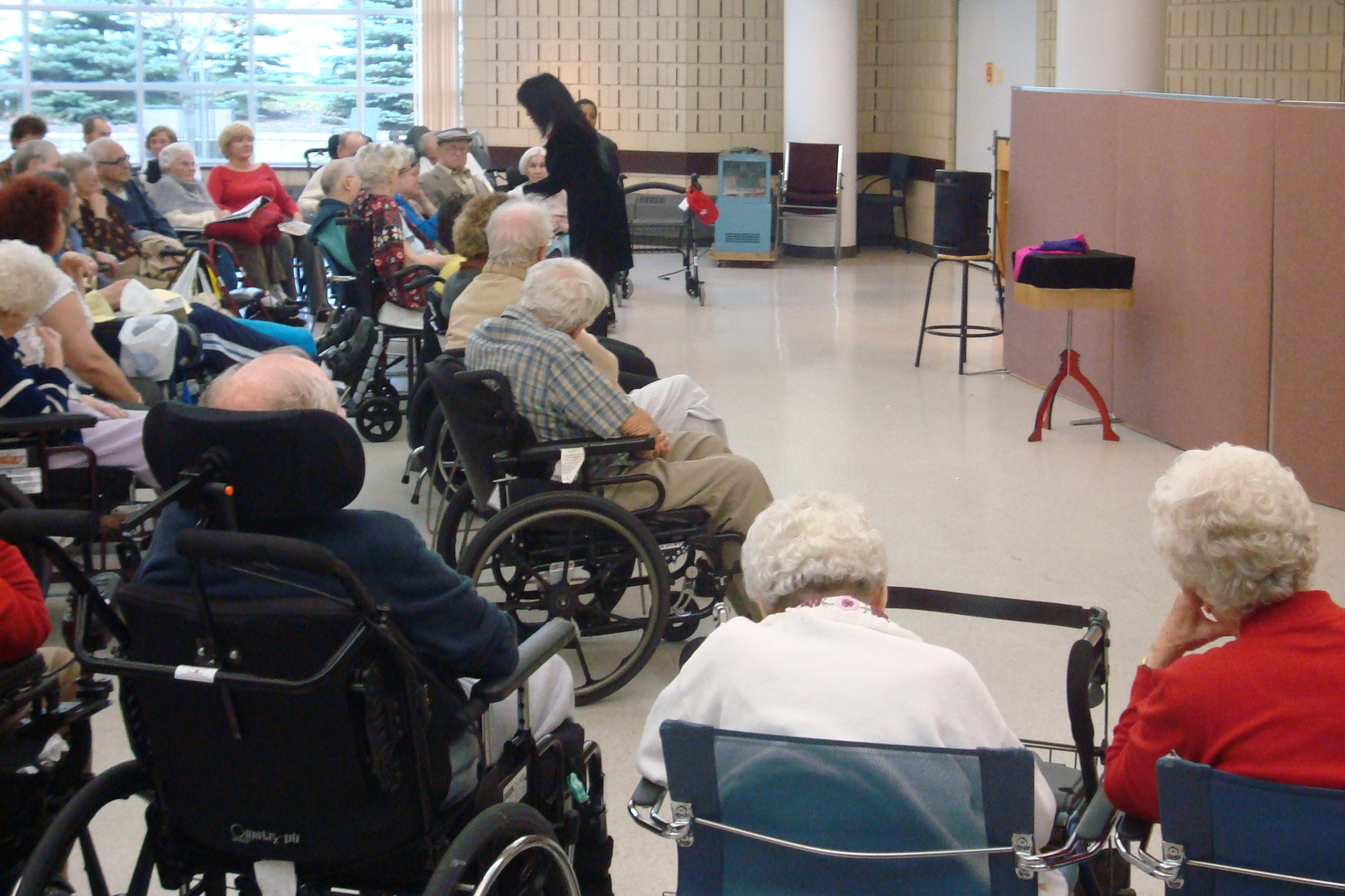
Performance of Hocus Pocus for seniors at a senior's residence and community centre in the Greater Toronto Area, November 2008

Senior Sorcery, launched in 2006, is designed to bring live theatre in the form of magic shows to the senior citizen community, particularly to isolated seniors in remote residences and/or community centres. The program engages seniors by breaking the "fourth wall" of theatre and involving their participation in the magic. The program also empowers by giving seniors the ability to invite their family and friends to a special event. The program also aims to bridge or connect generations by offering a group activity that all can participate in, enjoy together and to discuss afterwards.

The program is administrated by Magicana and is a core activity of the organization.
