= Allan Slaight =

Canadian media executive (1931–2021)

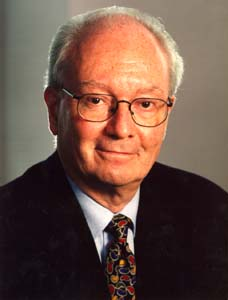
- Allan Slaight in the 1980s
- Born: John Allan Slaight; July 19, 1931; Galt, Ontario, Canada
- Died: September 19, 2021 (aged 90); Toronto, Ontario, Canada
- Occupation: Media mogul
- Known for: Founder of Slaight Communications; Owner of Standard Broadcasting; Co-owner of the Toronto Raptors
- Spouse(s): Ada Mitchell (1950–1987); Emanuelle Gattuso (1995–2021)
- Children: 3, including Gary Slaight

John Allan Slaight, CM (July 19, 1931 – September 19, 2021) was a Canadian rock and roll radio pioneer, media mogul, and philanthropist. He began his career as an amateur magician before moving to radio. He was the founder of Slaight Communications and the president and CEO of Standard Broadcasting Corporation Limited, which was Canada's largest privately owned multimedia company at the time. He was also an active philanthropist and founder of the Slaight Family Foundation. On September 19, 2021, he died in his home in Toronto, Ontario, at the age of 90.

== Biography ==
Slaight was born on July 19, 1931 in Galt (now Cambridge), Ontario, Canada to Florence Eileen Wright and John Edgar (Jack) Slaight. His father was a newspaperman who worked for the Galt Evening Reporter (now Cambridge Reporter). His family, including his younger siblings Brian and Ann, moved to Moose Jaw, Saskatchewan when their father bought the Moose Jaw Times-Herald in 1945. Jack Slaight was also the eventual co-owner of Moose Jaw radio station CHAB-AM, one of Canada's first radio stations.

== Career ==
A magician since his youth, Slaight's interest in magic started at age eight, after seeing Johnny Giordmaine's performance at the Toyland section of Eaton's department store in Toronto. Slaight began touring Western Canada as a mind reader under the stage name “Will Powers”, a career influenced by his interest in sleight-of-hand and magical inventions.

He had performed a large-scale magic show under the "Slaight & Co" banner. His traveling magic show would often cause him to spend 14 hours away from home, visiting small towns to perform for $10. Slaight's show may have been inspired from his early days in the 1940s, performing for his grandfather's staff at a local bank in Galt for $2, or his regular performances at conventions and at the Rotary Club in Moose Jaw. Slaight toyed with the idea of performing on a permanent basis, and indicated that he would have done so had it been profitable.

While working in radio and broadcasting, magic continued to be a part of Slaight's life. In an interview with The Globe and Mail in 2005, Slaight showcased his collection of thousands of magic trick books.

Slaight is the author of several magic titles including Stewart James in Print: The First Fifty Years (1989), The James File (3 Book Set) (2000), and Essential Stewart James (2007). Slaight co-hosted an annual magicians conference, 31 Faces North, with performing arts organization Magicana (Artistic Director David Ben) every summer. It is an annual invitation-only event inspired by and meant to resurrect the spirit of collaboration and camaraderie seen in the once-held magician's event (The Ibidem Event) hosted by P. Howard Lyons.

Slaight's magic tricks (the Magnetic Miraskill, OTWONE Prediction and others) can be found in most magic magazines from the past 50 years such as Ibidem, Genii – The Conjurors' Magazine, and Magic – The Independent Magazine for Magicians. In recognition of his involvement in magic, Magicana presented Slaight with Spins and Needles: The Magic of Allan Slaight, a hardcover book featuring 62 of his magic tricks.

== Business career ==
=== Radio Days (1948–1966) ===
==== CHAB ====
Slaight began his broadcasting career in Moose Jaw in 1948, at age 17, as an on-air news reporter and announcer for his father's station CHAB. His late-night jazz program, Spins and Needles, marked the beginning of his five-decade career in the radio industry. "I had never been inside a radio station before. But after one short visit to CHAB, I realized radio was what I wanted to do with my life," Slaight said in a 2002 interview.

Slaight arrived at the University of Saskatchewan in autumn 1949, to uphold a bargain he made with his father. In exchange for working one year at CHAB, Slaight was required to attend university. While at the University of Saskatchewan, Slaight worked as a columnist (A Sap's Fables) and jazz reviewer for the college newspaper, The Sheaf. He dropped out of his studies at the University of Saskatchewan after his first year and balanced his burgeoning broadcasting career with his traveling magic show.

==== CFRN & CJCA ====
In 1950, Slaight and his wife Ada moved to Edmonton, Alberta. Unable to find a job in radio, he sold shoes at the Eaton's Department store before finally joining radio station CFRN that same year as a news reporter, before leaving to join CJCA in 1952.

==== CHED-AM ====
In 1954 Slaight joined Edmonton-based radio station CHED-AM as the station's News Director. Two years later in 1956, he was appointed Merchandising Director.

==== CHUM-1050 Ltd: music and talk ====
In early 1958, he was hired as program and promotions manager for the Toronto-based CHUM radio station. CHUM had earlier turned to rock and roll to achieve a larger listenership and it was hoped that importing Slaight from Edmonton would allow CHUM to reach the number one spot on Toronto's radio waves.

By 1960, Slaight had been promoted to become CHUM-AM's Program Director, a position that he held until 1964.

=== English radio waves ===
With Terry Bate (of Stephens & Towndrow, a sales promotion company in Canada), Don McKenzie and Saundra MacKenzie, Slaight travelled to England to establish a sales agency for Radio Caroline. Radio Caroline had been founded by Ronan O'Rahilly in 1964 to overcome the BBC's radio broadcasting monopoly.

Slaight relocated to England to co-found a consulting firm specializing in sales, merchandising, and advertising within the emerging English commercial radio sector.

=== Canadian companies (1967–1984) ===
Slaight returned to Toronto in 1967, with a renewed passion to own his own radio station. Upon his return, he formed Allan Slaight Limited, a company engaged in advertising and communications. He then established a strategic partnership with Stephens & Towndrow, a sales firm that placed commercials with radio and TV stations, for his company to act as consultants in Programming, Sales and Marketing. They represented 18 AM and FM radio stations throughout Canada and had been acquired by Canadian broadcasters from CBS Radio. By September of that same year, Stephens & Towndrow publicly announced that Slaight was to be appointed President and Managing Director.

==== Slaight Broadcasting Ltd. ====
In 1970, Slaight founded Slaight Broadcasting Ltd. and bought CFGM-1310 AM (previously known under the call sign CJRH and now known as CFMJ:AM 640) from owners John Graham and Stewart Coxford. for $2.5 million. In order to raise the necessary funds, Slaight put a second mortgage on his house and sought out investment partners including Gordon Lightfoot, guaranteeing them a generous return on investment should they back him. The following year, Allan Slaight took ownership of CFGM, which was Canada's first full-time country and western music station.

On July 13, 1972, Slaight was granted permission by Canadian Radio-television and Telecommunications Commission (CRTC) to acquire 80 per cent holdings of Montreal-based station CFOX-AM. Upon ownership, Slaight changed the format to "new country music" to match CFGM.

After receiving federal permission on May 22, 1973, Slaight Broadcasting Ltd. merged with IWC Communications (originally Industrial Wire and Cable) on July 1, 1973. The merger resulted in Slaight acquiring other cable media systems in Mississauga, Barrie, Orillia, and Sarnia-based radio station CHOK, while retaining CFGM Broadcasting Ltd. and Radio CFOX Inc. Slaight had previously bought into IWC in 1970, becoming a shareholder. CFGM Broadcasting Ltd continued as a subsidiary of IWC Communications Ltd.

==== Global Television ====
After becoming president of a company running three radio stations and three cable systems, Slaight made a $12 million bid in early 1973 to acquire 52 percent of Bushnell Broadcasting of Ottawa, Vancouver, and Toronto. The CRTC rejected the bid on March 26, 1973. But, the following day, Slaight was pleased to find out he and the board of directors had been given permission to acquire the fledgling and debt-ridden Global Television Network that had been founded by Al Bruner.

On April 15, 1974, under a restructuring and re-financing plan put forward by a group of investors, Allan Slaight purchased a 45 per cent interest in Global Communications Ltd, along with Global Ventures Holding Ltd. (45 per cent) and Seymour Epstein (10 per cent).

At the time, Global was at least $5 million in debt and losing an estimated 1.5 million per month. Part of Slaight's strategy to turn Global around was to broadcast movies five nights a week at the 6:30 time slot with the news broadcast at the earlier 6:00 PM time. Slaight also incorporated a number of imports and reruns from the US, laid off employees, and doubled the amount of broadcasting time devoted to news and public affairs.

In 1974, Slaight authorized a rights offering of IWC's shares where proceeds would be used to finance a portion of Global Communications Ltd. Slaight also was granted approval from the network's original public investors to change voting power and repayment terms so that he could better financially negotiate for the September television line-up.

In 1975, Slaight proposed loosening CRTC Canadian content quotas for independent broadcast stations compared to other affiliates and vigorously advocated for rules that would benefit smaller broadcasters. Slaight, for example publicly "oppose[d] the intrusion of any Canadian provincial government into any sector of Canadian broadcasting," when a probe on violence on television was launched for what Slaight considered to be a PR stunt.

By December 1976, Slaight had successfully navigated Global out of debt and the television station had reached a break-even point in its day-to-day operations. Slaight and IWC exercised a "buy-sell clause" on December 22 to buy out its investment and financing partners Global Communications Ltd. and Seymour Epstein. Collectively, the two partners held 55% of Global's holdings. Instead, Slaight and IWC were bought out by Winnipeg Theatre tycoon Paul Morton.

==== Radio IWC Ltd. ====
As a result of the buy-out, IWC's holdings were reduced significantly in the industry and in 1977 IWC prepared to sell off the controlling interest of its broadcasting holdings to Selkirk Holdings Ltd. (one of Canada's largest broadcasting companies at the time), and to sell off its cable television assets to Credit Valley Cable TV/FM Ltd. The CRTC denied the radio-related application but approved the cable application. In the wake of the ruling, Slaight distributed over $10 million among shareholders (the net proceeds from the sale of Global Communications Ltd.) and successfully requested to change the company's name to Radio IWC Ltd.

In 1978, Allan Slaight made a bid for all the common shares outside of Radio IWC Ltd. essentially becoming IWC's largest shareholder. At the time, he owned 14 per cent, with Allpak Products Ltd. controlling 36 per cent. Under the new agreement, Slaight acquired another 42 per cent (including 36% from Allpak Products Ltd and 6% from Joseph Mac-Brien), and purchased CFGM Broadcasting Ltd. (CFGM and CILQ-FM) from IWC Communications Ltd. in 1978 following the sale of his interest in the Global Television Network and IWC's cable interests. He renamed Radio IWC Ltd to Slaight Communications Inc. the following year.

==== CILQ-FM/Q107 Rock ====
In 1976, Slaight applied for a CFGM-AM renewal license and asked the CRTC to consider an FM license for a sister station. Slaight proposed that the new station would offer an ombudsman service for listeners and include other services such as consumer reports. The station was licensed that summer and CILQ-FM ("Q107"), transmitting at 107.1 MHz, debuted on June 1, 1977, with offices operating from Toronto's Hudson Bay Centre, 30th floor and transmitting from the CN Tower.

==== Urban Outdoors ====
In 1982, Slaight bought a controlling interest in Urban Outdoors, the second-largest outdoor advertising business in Canada. The company specialized in backlit outdoor advertising in Canada's 20 largest markets. The pairing of outdoor advertising with radio seemed a natural fit to Slaight who stated that the business was "about as recession-proof as any business."

==== CBC ====
In early 1985, Slaight and a group of businessmen proposed a controversial idea, that of purchasing the CBC's English language TV network. Under the privatization plan, private business interests would have transformed the CBC's English TV network to a profit-oriented business and would have reduced Canadian content from 74 per cent to 50 per cent in prime time and 60 per cent overall. Prime Minister Brian Mulroney definitively stated that CBC was not for sale. Slaight nonetheless saw the endeavor as an exercise to expose waste at the CBC. "But if we can expose what some of us see as scandalous waste at the CBC, I think we will have done a decent thing for the taxpayers."

=== Slaight Investments and Standard Broadcasting (1985) ===
In July 1985, Allan Slaight acquired Conrad Black and Montegu Black's Hollinger Argus Ltd.'s 49 per cent stake in Standard Broadcasting Corp.

Acquiring Standard Broadcasting Corp. was a battle for Slaight as Selkirk Communications Ltd. also submitted a tender for the company. Scuttled by the CRTC, which ruled that Selkirk was ineligible to buy Standard, Selkirk redoubled its efforts and came back with a private bid that was higher than Slaight's. Selkirk's offer divided the Hollinger's Board of Directors with the 12 independent members suggesting tendering the bid to Selkirk and the five Hollinger-appointed directors recommending Slaight. Selkirk once again raised their offer, requested a bid extension, and issued a premature press release that angered Hollinger Argus. After a failed Supreme Court of Ontario bid by Selkirk to extend the bid deadline, the deal with Slaight proceeded. Conrad Black rejected Selkirk's bid primarily due to Slaight's willingness to sell off his current holdings to be in compliance with CRTC regulations. Black desired to sell off his broadcast holdings quickly and without entanglements.

In total, Slaight acquired 84.8% of Standard shares in his tender for an estimated $110 million. The deal saw Slaight's acquisition of two of Canada's oldest and most popular radio stations, CFRB (1010) and adult rock CKFM (99.9) as well as radio and TV stations in Montreal, Ottawa and St. Catharines. Due to CRTC regulations at the time, the deal also required Slaight to sell Q107 (managed by son Gary) and CFGM (managed by son Greg) to Westcom Radio Group of Vancouver. Under CRTC rules at that time, broadcasters were prohibited from owning two AM or two FM stations in the same city.

The acquisition of Standard Broadcasting brought CFRB, CKFM, CJAD-AM, CJFM-FM, Capital Radio in London, CJOH-TV, and CKTB and CJQR (St. Catharines) within his domain in addition to his then-current holdings.

What emerged from the acquisition was Slaight's promise to increase Standard Broadcasting Corp.'s financial support for the promotion of the Canadian recording industry and spending $15,000 at CKFM sponsoring Canadian musicians. Despite this, there were concerns among the listening public of the acquisition.

Slaight implemented changes at CFRB, including computerizing the newsroom, introducing phone-in shows, a supper-hour newscast, and more contemporary music, leading to its transformation into an all-talk format. Slaight himself returned to his radio roots and assumed responsibilities of CFRB's programming when his hired man, Peter Shurman, resigned. Following these changes, the station experienced increased listenership, and Slaight repaid the $175 million debt over nine years.

==== Continued growth (1985–2021) ====
In 1988, Slaight diversified Standard Broadcasting by branching out into production and program syndication with the launch of Sound Source Networks. Sound Source Networks was Standard Broadcasting's syndication division delivering content and targeted programming.

In that same year, Allan Slaight sold CJOH-TV (Ottawa), an affiliate of CTV so he could focus on expanding his radio holdings for Standard Broadcasting. The decision was prompted by a 1987 CRTC ruling in which the CRTC awarded a new TV license for the Ottawa area. Both CHUM and Baton Broadcasting eagerly entered the bidding race, which encroached on Slaight's own Ottawa-based CJOH franchise. When Baton pitched "National Capital Television," a patriotic showcase for Canadiana and Canadian content viewing that would spend $31 million over five years on Canadian programming, the CRTC awarded Baton the Ottawa license. Slaight, angered, appealed to the Federal Cabinet, citing that the "decision ha[d] the potential for changing the face of Canadian broadcasting." But instead of opening a competing Ottawa station, Baton approached Slaight and offered to buy CJOH for a premium price of $85 million. Slaight accepted, and Baton surrendered its awarded license to the CRTC, having used the license acquisition as a bartering chip against Slaight.

On April 8, 1988, the CRTC approved the purchase of CJOH by Baton Broadcasting Inc., with the transfer taking place May 5, 1988.

In the 1990s, Slaight continued expanding the company's acquisition base, acquiring CFCN-AM, CJAY-FM (from Calgary), CFRN-AM and CJKE-FM (from Edmonton), CKZZ-FM (Vancouver), CISL (Richmond). By July 2000, Standard owned 12 stations. By early 2001, Standard owned 35 radio stations. In June 2001, Standard Broadcasting acquired 64 radio stations from Quebec's Telemedia Corp., which was owned by the de Gaspe Beaubien family. The station acquisitions included four stations in London, Ontario, three in Hamilton, Ontario and three in St. Catharines, Ontario. Two months later, Standard Broadcasting sold 29 of those stations before receiving regulatory approval for the original Telemedia buy.

The acquisition quadrupled Standard's holdings. At that time, Standard's portfolio included radio stations, video distribution and duplication, electronic game distribution, advertising, post-production services in video and audio and retail marketing.

While Slaight had handed the reins of day-to-day operations in 2001 to Dave Coriat, CFO, and son Gary Slaight, CEO, Allan Slaight was quick to point out that his authority still prevailed. "If I really resist something, it generally doesn't happen," Slaight admitted. Coriat agreed when interviewed, citing Allan Slaight's impeccable timing and business instincts, calling Slaight the "ultimate entrepreneur" who can quickly calculate potential return and "controlled risk-taking." "He's not about to blow the money he's worked so hard to earn," Coriat said of Slaight.

In 2002, Standard acquired Iceberg Media.com Inc, an internet radio portal providing music for Web sites. The acquisition complemented Standard's existing portfolio as they held a minority interest in Moontaxi (a jazz and classical music online radio service) and MapleCore Ltd. (an e-commerce portal selling concert merchandise and tickets).

In 2003, Standard held a 30% interest in Canada's first licensed "Urban" station, Milestone Radio Inc. and an equivalent interest in Haliburton Broadcasting Group Inc. that consisted of nine Ontario stations, a group of rural Alberta stations and a Calgary-based jazz station, as well as a number of other interests (Sound Source Networks, Video One, Instore Focus Inc, Professional Warehouse Demonstrators, Canada Post Transfer Corporation).

In 2004, Standard Radio joined with CBC/Radio and SIRIUS Satellite Radio to bring satellite radio to Canada.

In 2007, Allan Slaight authorized the sale of Standard Radio Inc. to Astral Media Inc. in a $1.08 billion deal. The negotiation saw Slaight taking one-fifth of the purchase price of Astral stock ($880 million cash), giving Slaight a non-voting stake (4.75 million class A non-voting shares) in the company of 8.7 per cent. The sale did not include Standard's interests in Sirius Satellite Radio, Iceberg Media, Flow 93.5FM, Haliburton Broadcasting and Newcap Inc. in Alberta.

After the sale of Standard Broadcasting, the company, once again became known as Slaight Communications.

==== Legacy ====
After 52 years involved in radio as a broadcaster, News Director, Manager, Merchandising Director, Program and Promotions Manager, Programming Director, Vice President and President and the "father of rock radio in Toronto," Allan Slaight stepped down as President and CEO of Standard Broadcasting Corporation, and assumed the position of Executive Chairman of the Board of Directors of Slaight Communications, after having created Canada's largest privately and solely owned multimedia company, with annual revenues exceeding $500,000,000 and the employer of 1,500 full-time employees and 6,000 part-time employees.

When asked in an interview what his desired legacy would be, Slaight responded, "I would like to have the company regarded as the finest radio group in Canada with the finest executives and the finest staff."

== "Shotgun" Slaight & the Toronto Raptors ==
In addition to broadcasting, Slaight was involved in a number of other business ventures. In the early 1990s, he partnered with John Bitove Jr. to launch an NBA franchise, Toronto Raptors, as the world's best and richest basketball league expanded outside of the United States and into two Canadian cities, Toronto and Vancouver. Slaight and Bitove Jr. each held a 39.5 per cent share with the Bank of Nova Scotia holding 10 per cent, Isiah Thomas (9 per cent) and other minority holding partners. Brought together by former Ontario Premier David Peterson (1 per cent holding), Slaight and Bitove were persuaded that Toronto was a market ready for an NBA franchise. In their pitch to the NBA, their presentation included plans for a state-of-the-art downtown arena dedicated to the Raptors.

Slaight and Bitove eventually disagreed on the arena plans; Slaight expressed concerns about the financial viability of constructing a separate stadium without the involvement of the Maple Leaf hockey franchise, which had announced plans to build their own arena. The Maple Leafs were willing to share the majority of the cost burden and have the Raptors act as a junior tenant. Eventually, Slaight invoked the "shotgun clause" in his ownership deal, essentially forcing either Bitove or Slaight to buy out one another with a 60-day limit to pay the cash. Slaight prevailed and reluctantly bought out Bitove, whose passion for the Raptors was evident but declined the offer. On November 15, 1996, Slaight gained 79 per cent control of the Raptors. "It's exciting, nervous-making and at the same time very proud. It's a big financial exposure. Anything of this magnitude would make any sane individual nervous – and I still have some sanity," Slaight said.

The move was controversial to some, including General Manager Isiah Thomas, who himself had declared interest in gaining majority ownership. Considered by many in the press as a more appropriate owner because of his basketball credentials, Thomas and his backers (David Thomson, son of Lord Kenneth Thomson) failed to meet Slaight's price and conditions for his share of the Raptors and resigned as general manager.

Though Leafs Chairman Steve Stavro publicly declared having little interest in moving the Maple Leafs to the proposed basketball arena, the Air Canada Centre (now Scotiabank Arena) at the foot of Bay Street, with Slaight contractually obligated to build the NBA arena (lest he paid $75 million in fines), and Stavro in negotiations with Slaight, land for the Air Canada Centre was purchased in November 1996 at Bay Street and Lakeshore Boulevard. Shovels went into the ground February 5, 1997 with an official ceremony held on March 13, 1997. Ultimately the Ontario Teachers Pension Plan led the buyout of Slaight from the Raptors and Air Canada Centre, putting the two teams in one building and erecting Toronto's new home for hockey, basketball and concerts, and rebranding the business as Maple Leaf Sports & Entertainment.

== Personal life ==
Slaight married Ada Mitchell in 1950 when he was 19 and had three children (Gary b. 1951, Greg b. 1953, Jan Marie b. 1954).

== Philanthropic activities ==
Slaight has a long history of philanthropic activities in a number of health and arts-related realms. In a 2001 interview, Slaight stated, "I've done pretty well by Canada and by Toronto, and I very strongly believe you should give a lot back," reflecting his philanthropic philosophy"

- In 1998, Slaight's radio stations helped raise and donate over $1 million for various Canadian charities. CFRB 1010 and Mix 99.9 raised $510,000 during the Sick Children Telethon. The Bear 106.9 FM raised $40,000 for the Rock Auction for the Children's Hospital of Eastern Ontario. Edmonton's Bear 100.3 FM announced a $100,000 family apartment suite for those with patients in the neo-natal unit. Z95.3 FM and Oldies 650 raised $288,000 for cancer research.
- Slaight has donated $5 million to the Transformation AGO (Art Gallery of Ontario) Campaign. A Frank Gehry-designed central staircase is named after Slaight for his donation.
- In 2008, Slaight founded the Slaight Family Foundation along with trustees David Coriat and Gary Slaight.
- In 2009, Slaight and his second wife Emanuelle Gattuso donated $22 million to create a rapid diagnostic centre for breast cancer awareness.
- In 2009, Slaight donated $75,000 for three years to The Walrus to create the Allan Slaight Writers' Fund to support serious journalism.
- In 2009, the Shaw Festival acknowledged Slaight's continuing support of the organization since 1982 by renaming The Academy (the professional training, play development, publishing and education wing of the Shaw Festival) to The Slaight Family Academy.
- In 2013, Slaight donated $18,000 to restore a grand piano that belonged to Fats Domino that had been damaged in Hurricane Katrina.
- In 2013, Slaight donated $50 million to the Princess Margaret Hospital for cancer research.
- In 2014, the Slaight Family donated $3 million to OCAD University to honour his first wife, Ada Slaight (whom he divorced in 1987). The donation was to fund scholarships, improve studio space and create a Chair position honoring Ada Slaight's commitment to OCAD through her volunteer endeavours.
- In 2015, Slaight donated $2 million to the National Ballet of Canada to fund the production of Le Petit Prince.
- In 2015, the Slaight Family Foundation (the charitable foundation named after Allan) donated $7 million to support seven Canadian non-governmental organizations: Stephen Lewis Foundation; War Child; Free the Children; Right to Play; Human Rights Watch; Partners in Health Canada; World Vision.
- In 2015, the Slaight Family Foundation donated $250,000 to be distributed over five years for magicians in five categories for the Allan Slaight Award: Lifetime Achievement Award ($15,000); Sharing Wonder Award ($15,000); Sharing Secrets Award ($10,000); International Rising Award ($5,000) and Canadian Rising Award ($5,000) in honor of Slaight's personal passion for the craft. 2015 winners have included Johnny Thompson (Lifetime), Penn & Teller.
- In October 2015, Allan Slaight founded the Allan Slaight Radio Institute through his donation of $3 million to the RTA (Radio and Television Arts) School of Media at Toronto Metropolitan University (Formerly Ryerson University). In addition to providing a state-of-the-art broadcast and teaching facility, a number of renewable student entrance awards were newly created to support student productions.
- On an ongoing basis, Slaight Communications funds the Allan Slaight Honour, which recognizes the achievements of young Canadians making a positive impact in the field of film, literature, visual art, sport, philanthropy, music. Past winners have included Nikki Yanofsky (2010), Drake (2011), Melanie Fiona (2012), Carly Rae Jepsen, (2013), The Weeknd (2014), Shawn Mendes (2015), Brett Kissel (2016), & Shawn Hook (2017).
- Slaight Communications awards an annual Allan Slaight Humanitarian Spirit Award to entertainers who embody the humanitarian and philanthropic spirit of Slaight himself. Past winners have included Sarah McLachlan (2011), Chantal Kreviazuk and Raine Maida (2012), Simple Plan (2013), Bruce Cockburn (2014), Bryan Adams (2015), Nelly Furtado (2016).
- A $2-million donation from The Slaight Family Foundation was given to Carleton University in Ottawa to create a Chair for the Study of Conjuring Arts in late 2017.

== Public service and distinctions ==
Throughout his career, Allan Slaight has held a number of honorary positions, directorships and chairmanships.

- Trustee of Women's College Hospital (1978–1982).
- Director of the United Way of Greater Toronto (1979–1987)

- His contributions have included organizing two fundraising concerts by legendary rock group Rush and organizing a Platinum Blonde benefit at Maple Leaf Gardens in cooperation with United Way President Gordon Cressy in 1985.
- Served as Campaign Chair in 1985, breaking then-set fundraising records by raising at least $29.5 million, 11.9 per cent more than in 1984. The 11.9 per cent increase is the highest year over year increase in the United Way's history.

- Director of the Shaw Festival (1982–1988)

- Served as a board member of The Shaw from 1982 to 1988
- Served as the 1985–1986 Chairman of the festival

- Governor of York University (1986–1987)
- Chairman of Friends of Harbourfront
- Director of the Festival of Festival (1989–1993)
- In 1997, Slaight was inducted into the Canadian Association of Broadcasters (CAB) Broadcast Hall of Fame (1997).
- In June 2000, Slaight was the recipient of an Honorary Doctor of Commerce from Ryerson Polytechnic University.
- In 2001, with the approval of Queen Elizabeth, Slaight was appointed to become a member of the Order of Canada.
- In 2005, Slaight was the recipient of the Walt Grealis Special Achievement Award. Presented at the Juno Awards, the Canadian Academy of Recording Arts and Sciences (CARAS) honoured Slaight for his contributions to the music industry. Slaight was lauded for "his never-ending dedication to the Canadian radio industry," by CARAS President Melanie Berry. Artists such as Gordon Lightfoot and Ronnie Hawkins considered Slaight influential for Canadian music. "Before we had any Canadian content rules, Allan went to bat for Canadian artists," said Lightfoot. Ronnie Hawkins stated of Slaight that "He spent a lifetime working...to help Canadian music and make it better. Everyone in music in Canada owes Al, especially me. According to musician Ronnie Hawkins, Slaight and his associates were among the early promoters of rock 'n' roll in Canada."

Sporting positions
Preceded by John Bitove	Toronto Raptors owner 1996–1998	Succeeded by Larry Tanenbaum (MLSE)
