= Milli Vanilli =

German pop duo

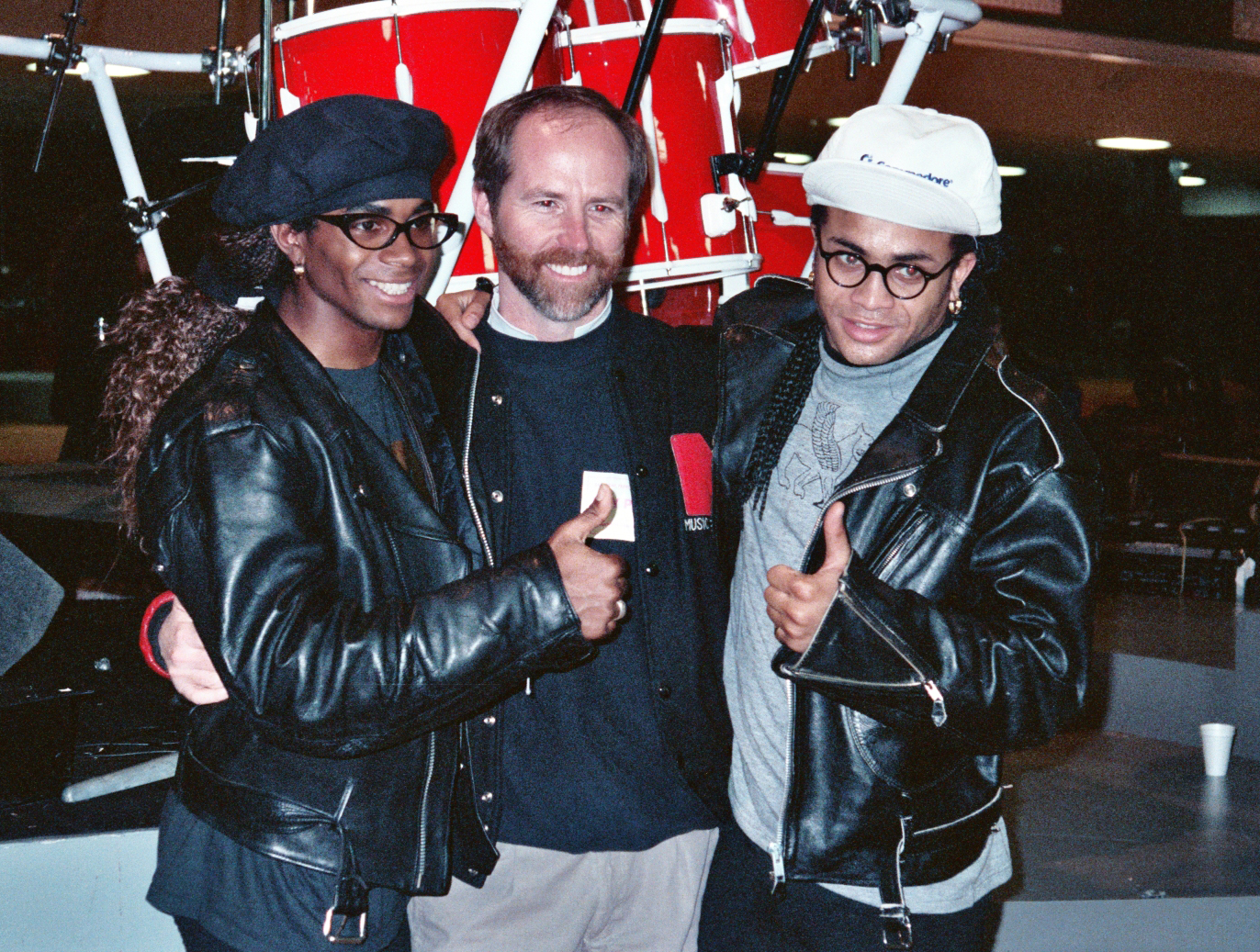
- Fab Morvan (left) and Rob Pilatus (right) with the NARAS president Mike Greene, 1990

Background information
- Origin: Munich, Germany
- Genres: Pop; hip-hop; R&B; dance; disco
- Years active: 1988–1990; 1997–1998
- Labels: Arista; Hansa
- Past members: Fab Morvan; Rob Pilatus

Milli Vanilli (/ˈmɪli vəˈnɪli/) was a pop duo founded in 1988 in Munich, Germany, comprising Fab Morvan and Rob Pilatus. They combined pop, rap, R&B, disco and dance. The producer Frank Farian hired Brad Howell, John Davis, Charles Shaw, Jodie Rocco and Linda Rocco to sing on the records, and had Morvan and Pilatus pose as the performers, dancing and lip-syncing.

Milli Vanilli's debut album, All or Nothing, was released in Europe in 1988 and was repackaged by Arista Records for the US as Girl You Know It's True in 1989. It spent eight weeks at number one on the US Billboard 200 chart and produced three number-one singles, making Milli Vanilli one of the most popular acts of the year. In 1990, they won three American Music Awards and the Grammy Award for Best New Artist.

Rumors spread that Milli Vanilli did not sing, owing to their French and German accents and a malfunction at a live show. After they pressured Farian to let them sing, in November 1990, Farian confirmed that their vocals were provided by other singers, leading to a backlash. Their music was pulled from radio rotation, their Grammy was revoked, and Arista deleted Girl You Know It's True from its catalog and refunded customers following several class action lawsuits. Farian defended Milli Vanilli as an art project combining musical and visual elements.

Farian repurposed songs planned for Milli Vanilli's second album as The Moment of Truth, released in 1991 under the name the Real Milli Vanilli, without Morvan and Pilatus. In 1993, Morvan and Pilatus released an album as Rob & Fab, which sold only 2,000 copies. A comeback album produced by Farian, Back and in Attack, was canceled after Pilatus's death from a drug overdose in 1998. Morvan gained the rights to the Milli Vanilli name, and continues to perform, singing live. In 2023, the documentary film Milli Vanilli and the biographical film Girl You Know It's True were released. In later years, Milli Vanilli came to be viewed with sympathy and some commentators saw them as victims of industry greed.

== History ==
=== Formation and All or Nothing, 1984–1989 ===
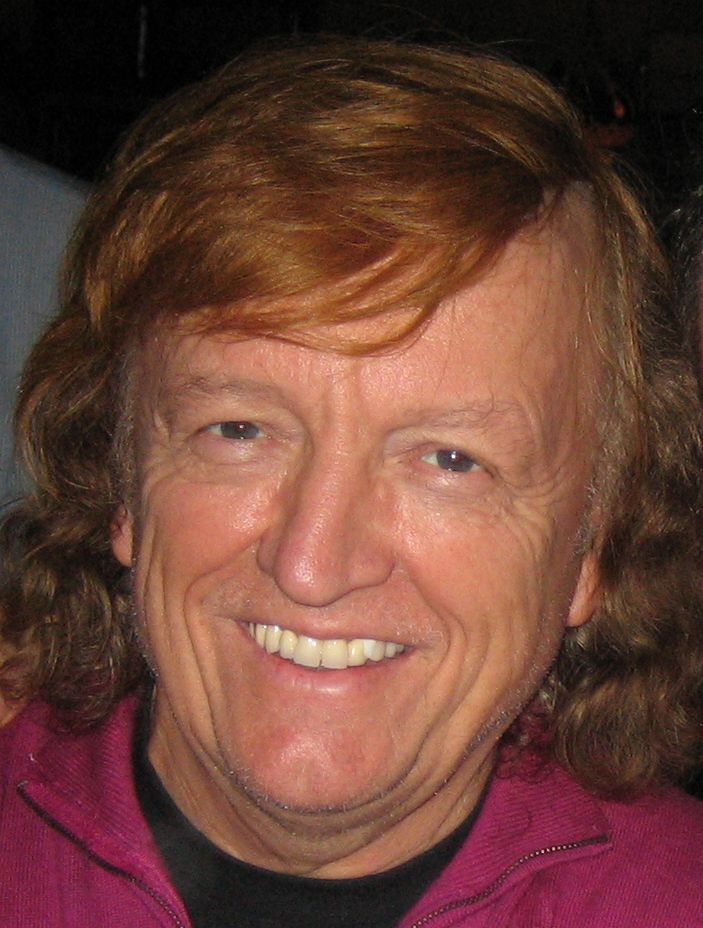
Frank Farian, the producer of Milli Vanilli, in 2008

Rob Pilatus, from Munich, and Fab Morvan, from Paris, met at a Los Angeles disco in the 1980s and reconnected again in Munich. They bonded over their experiences growing up black in European cities. In Munich, they attempted to find work as backing singers, then formed their own act and recorded an album for a small record label that sold a few thousand copies. They also worked as dancers for pop singers and hosted club nights. According to Pilatus, they struggled financially and lived in a housing project.

Around this period, the German music producer Frank Farian recorded a cover of the Numarx song "Girl You Know It's True" with session musicians. Farian had previously created the 1970s disco band Boney M, whose frontman, Bobby Farrell, was a dancer who lip-synced to Farian's vocals. For "Girl You Know It's True", Farian enlisted studio vocalists including Charles Shaw, John Davis, Brad Howell and the twin sisters Jodie and Linda Rocco.

After "Girl You Know It's True" became a hit in Europe, Farian enlisted Morvan and Pilatus to pose as the singers. According to Pilatus, Farian said he would make them multi-millionaires. On 1 January 1988, Morvan and Pilatus signed a contract with Farian to record 10 songs a year. They signed without understanding the terms and conditions. Morvan said later that they tried to leave the contract when Farian would not allow them to sing, but that he demanded they pay back their advance. This was denied by Ingrid Segieth, Farian's assistant and lover. According to Pilatus, Farian promised they would be allowed artistic input after they had done enough promotional work.

Morvan and Pilatus spent much of 1988 promoting "Girl You Know It's True" in Spain, France and Italy. It reached the top five in 23 countries, including number 2 on the US Billboard Hot 100, and sold seven million copies worldwide. Milli Vanilli's debut album, All or Nothing, was released in Europe in November 1988. According to Pilatus, Farian told them they had to continue the ruse and gave them a $20,000 advance. They went along with the plan as they had never had success before.

=== Girl You Know It's True and American success, 1989 ===
In the US, Arista Records repackaged All or Nothing as Girl You Know It's True in March 1989, including an additional song, "Blame It on the Rain", written by Diane Warren. It spent 78 weeks on the Billboard 200 chart, including eight weeks at number one, making Milli Vanilli one of the biggest pop acts of the year. It was certified six-times platinum in January 1990. The singles "Blame It on the Rain", "Girl I'm Gonna Miss You" and "Baby Don't Forget My Number" all reached number one on the Billboard Hot 100 chart. Milli Vanilli's music videos were played in heavy rotation on MTV.

In April 1989, Milli Vanilli declined to perform on The Arsenio Hall Show, which requires artists to perform live. They hired Sandy Gallin as their manager that month and moved to Beverly Hills on 11 June. Rumors spread that Milli Vanilli had not performed on their songs. During a London radio interview, the host demanded they sing on air. When Milli Vanilli gave their first MTV interview, their limited English made the crew wonder if they had sung on their records. In July 1989, Morvan and Pilatus asked to stop giving interviews as their accents were driving suspicion. In December, Shaw told Newsday he was one of the real vocalists, but retracted the claim. He later said Farian had threatened him for going to the press. Farian denied this, but said he had settled with Shaw for US$155,000.

In mid-1989, Milli Vanilli joined the Club MTV tour alongside several other acts. On 21 July, during a performance on MTV at the Lake Compounce theme park in Bristol, Connecticut, the prerecorded "Girl You Know It's True" vocal track became stuck on repeat. Morvan and Pilatus continued to mime, then ran off stage. Although several other acts on the tour also lip-synced, the incident proved that Milli Vanilli did not sing live at their shows. The incident was not widely reported, and the audience accepted the lip-syncing as part of the show. However, Pilatus said later that the incident was "the beginning of the end for Milli Vanilli". A 1990 episode of In Living Color parodied Milli Vanilli, mocking their accents, hair and dance moves.

=== American Music Awards and Grammy, 1990 ===
In January 1990, at the American Music Awards, Milli Vanilli won for favorite new pop-rock artist, favorite new soul or rhythm and blues artist, and favorite pop-rock single (for "Girl You Know It's True"). In February, they won Best New Artist at the 32nd Grammy Awards. Morvan said later that he and Pilatus had not wanted to win, as "the criteria for the Grammys is that you have to sing on the record ... When they called out our name, something exploded in the pit of my stomach." Todd Headlee, a former assistant at their management company, said Gallin was furious when he discovered he had submitted them for consideration. Though the Grammy awards ceremony usually requires acts to perform live, Milli Vanilli's management convinced them to make an exception by saying their dance routines made live singing impossible.

A March 1990 issue of Time quoted Pilatus proclaiming himself "the new Elvis" and saying that Milli Vanilli were more talented than Bob Dylan, Paul McCartney and Mick Jagger. In an interview with the Los Angeles Times later that year, Pilatus said this was a misunderstanding stemming from his poor English: "I was in shock when I read it ... All I said was that Elvis was a big idol in his time and we were big in ours."

=== Exposure and backlash, 1990–1991 ===
In November 1990, Farian released a new Milli Vanilli single, "Keep on Running", without the approval of Morvan and Pilatus. They continued to pressure Farian to let them sing. In response, on 14 November, Farian held a press conference in Munich where he fired both members and confirmed that they had not sung on their records. Their second album and 1991 tour were canceled.

The announcement triggered a backlash. Arista Records dropped Milli Vanilli and deleted Girl You Know It's True from its catalog, making it one of the highest-selling albums ever to be deleted. Former Arista executives later said that they had known about the deception, though the Arista president, Clive Davis, denied knowledge in 2017. Farian said he did not tell Arista about the lip-syncing when they signed Milli Vanilli. Their music was also pulled from radio rotations. On 19 November, the Recording Academy revoked Milli Vanilli's Grammy award. It is the only time a Grammy has been revoked. In an interview with the Los Angeles Times published on 16 November, Morvan and Pilatus confirmed the deception. Pilatus said Farian had tricked them, offering them contracts as singers but never allowing them to contribute.

On 20 November, Pilatus and Morvan held a press conference at Ocean Way Recording, Los Angeles. To prove they could sing, they distributed a video recording of themselves singing in a studio, and their voice coach, Seth Riggs, attested for their abilities. When reporters demanded they sing live, they sang and rapped for the room, to applause from the reporters. They apologized to their fans and told the reporters they had "made a pact with the devil" to escape poverty. They attempted to return their Grammy statuettes, saying "Brad Howell and Johnny Davis are the real singers", while minimizing Shaw's work. Morvan said later: "It was an awful experience ... It felt like we were met by a media lynch mob." The Guardian wrote in 2026 that "footage of the press conference makes for uncomfortable viewing: a baying crowd of predominantly white journalists shout questions and accusations at the duo, treating them like criminals". Milli Vanilli's publicist said he regretted arranging the conference, saying "there was nothing to be gained from my client's perspective ... the paparazzi descending like a lynch mob, all the cameramen yelling for them to sing... There was no way to win, but it brought some closure."

In an interview soon after, Farian said Pilatus had lied about his upbringing, saying Munich had no slums and that he had been a "normal German teenager". He insisted that Pilatus and Morvan could not sing and that they spent their time partying and sleeping. He expressed surprise at the controversy, saying acts such as the Village People, the Monkees and the Archies had not sung themselves and that lip syncing was necessary to create "perfect dance shows". However, he regretted not having had the real singers on stage with Morvan and Pilatus as dancers. Farian was unapologetic about the deception, describing Milli Vanilli as a project comprising visual and recorded elements and that "such projects are an art form in themselves". Morvan and Pilatus appeared in an episode of the animated series The Adventures of Super Mario Bros. 3, produced before the scandal and first broadcast in January 1991.

At least 26 class action lawsuits were filed claiming that Arista had defrauded consumers. On 12 August 1991, a judge rejected a proposed settlement in Chicago, Illinois, as consumers would have been reimbursed with credits for Arista purchases rather than money. On 28 August, a settlement was approved refunding those who attended concerts or bought Milli Vanilli recordings. An estimated 10 million buyers were eligible. The refund deadline passed on 8 March 1992. Marty Diamond, the former head of artist development at Arista, estimated that only around 50 people had requested refunds. In December 1990, the British-Canadian singer-songwriter David Clayton-Thomas sued Milli Vanilli for copyright infringement, alleging that "All or Nothing" used the melody from his 1968 composition "Spinning Wheel" by his group Blood, Sweat & Tears.

=== Later projects and death of Pilatus, 1991–1998 ===
Farian repurposed songs planned for Milli Vanilli's second album as The Moment of Truth, released in 1991 under the name the Real Milli Vanilli, with John Davis and Howell as the singers. It was never released in America. Following the scandal, Milli Vanilli became the butt of jokes. Morvan and Pilatus appeared in a commercial for Carefree Gum which parodied their lip-syncing. Pilatus told the Los Angeles Times that humor was a way to deal with mistakes, and that he and Morvan were interested in becoming actors and hoped to play themselves in a television adaptation of the scandal.

In October 1992, Morvan and Pilatus made their live singing debut as Rob & Fab on The Arsenio Hall Show, performing the single "We Can Get It On", released on the independent label Taj Records. In The Los Angeles Times, Chris Willman wrote that Morvan sang well but that Pilatus was clearly nervous and "fumbled ... though not necessarily fatally". In 1993, Morvan and Pilatus released an album as Rob & Fab. The Rolling Stone writer Chuck Eddy gave it two stars, saying it proved they could sing. It sold only 2,000 copies and bankrupted Taj Records.

Morvan and Pilatus assumed they would receive offers from other record companies, but none came. Morvan said: "One day, you're rich and famous and you have all these friends. The next day, everything is destroyed and you're all alone." He took a job teaching French at a Berlitz school, performed at small venues and hosted a show on the Los Angeles radio station KIIS-FM.

Pilatus fell into addiction. In 1996, after he assaulted two people and broke into a car, he was sentenced to three months in jail and six months at a drug treatment facility in California. He made several suicide attempts. In late 1997, he entered drug rehabilitation in Germany. That November, a Californian judge issued a warrant for his arrest after he failed to attend a probation violation hearing; he had been charged with grand theft, felony forgery and four 1996 misdemeanors. In December, Morvan said he was "going his own way" and had no relationship with Pilatus.

By 1997, Morvan and Pilatus were working with Farian again as Milli Vanilli. On 3 April 1998, the eve of their comeback tour, Pilatus died of an accidental overdose in a Frankfurt hotel, aged 33. Morvan said later that Pilatus had become addicted to public adoration and could not live without it. Their comeback album, Back and in Attack, was never released.

=== Films and revival, 2010s–present ===
After 20 years in Los Angeles, Morvan returned to Europe in the 2010s and started a family. As of 2015, he and John Davis were working on an album, Face Meets Voice: A True Milli Vanilli Experience. In 2016, Morvan appeared in a documentary-style KFC commercial about authenticity and his life after Milli Vanilli. Davis died on 24 May 2021 from complications of a COVID-19 infection.

On 14 February 2007, it was announced that Universal Pictures was developing a film based on Milli Vanilli. Jeff Nathanson was announced as the writer and director, with Morvan as a consultant. A biographical film by Bret Ratner was canceled in 2021 after sexual harassment allegations against Ratner became public. A biographical film directed by Simon Verhoeven, Girl You Know It's True, was released theatrically in 2023. A documentary film directed by Luke Korem, Milli Vanilli, premiered at the Tribeca Festival on 10 June.

In 2024, "Blame It on the Rain" and "Girl I'm Gonna Miss You" entered the TikTok Billboard Top 50 after they were used in the Netflix series Monsters: The Lyle and Erik Menendez Story. "Blame It on the Rain" reached number six on the Billboard Top TV Songs chart. Milli Vanilli debuted on the Artist 100 chart at number 88, and their EP 4 Hits entered the Billboard 200 chart at number 197. That year, an online petition demanded the Recording Academy return Milli Vanilli's Grammy. The Rolling Stone writer Rob Sheffield characterized the resurgence as "the year's weirdest revival" and a "vindication".

Farian died in 2024. In a statement, Morvan wrote: "His music will live on. We can never deny the happiness and joy it brought into this world." In 2025, Morvan published a memoir, You Know It's True: The Real Story of Milli Vanilli. It was nominated for the Grammy Award for Best Audio Book, Narration & Storytelling Recording at the 68th Annual Grammy Awards. As of 2026, Morvan had gained the rights to the Milli Vanilli name and was singing with a live band. The critic Owen Gleiberman wrote of a performance of "Blame It on the Rain" that Morvan "now sings it better than the original record".

Morvan was due to perform as Milli Vanilli at the Great American State Fair on the National Mall in Washington, DC, on Independence Day (4 July) 2026. Jodie Rocco released a statement confirming that the original singers would not be performing, and saying that anyone else using the Milli Vanilli name "should be considered a tribute band with no association vocally or musically to our sound or songs". On 2 June, after several other acts pulled out citing political objections, Morvan canceled his appearance, saying: "I was there to unite the people, to have them walk down memory lane, celebrate life ... But throughout the week it turned into a circus. I'm not into politics."

== Style ==
Milli Vanilli blended R&B, rap, disco and dance music. PopMatters described their songs as "perfect late '80s synth-pop that echoed the chic of that decade while paying stylistic heed to the decade that would be", and the Independent writer Sheila Flynn said their style was "peak 1980s". The AllMusic writer Stephen Thomas Erlewine wrote that Girl You Know It's True was fascinating for its "unrestrained, unhinged dorkiness, music that is completely awkward and sort of fun and memorable because of it".

Morvan and Pilatus had muscular physiques and wore long braided hair extensions, shoulder pads and spandex. Sheffield described them as "pretty boys who played up their homoerotic allure"; many Americans incorrectly assumed they were a gay couple. He said they presented a "radical new pop aesthetic ... a swirl of different racial and cultural signifiers", combining these elements with "trendy Euro-sleaze" into "rootless cosmopolitan mega-pop for a hip-hop world".

== Legacy ==
Milli Vanilli came to be viewed with sympathy following changes in culture, technology and the music industry. A 1997 VH1 TV special portrayed them as "pawns of a greedy record industry". The Los Angeles Times journalist Chuck Philips wrote the public had been "more impressed by image than talent, more accepting of appearances than demanding of the truth".

In later decades, the use of digital technology such as AutoTune to manipulate performances became commonplace. Several commentators argued that popular culture had become less authentic with the rise of reality TV and social media, and that "packaged" pop stars were now accepted. In 2020, the NBC journalist Bryan Reesman wrote that that Milli Vanilli were owed an apology: "They were young and foolish, like we all have been. If we had decided the group's debacle was the end of lip-syncing and digital manipulation and had raised our standards, it would be easier for us to justify how we derided them." In the Los Angeles Times, Christine Terrisse wrote that Milli Vanilli's misdeeds seemed quaint in the era of cancel culture. Luke Korem, the director of the 2023 documentary Milli Vanilli, said younger people were confused by the controversy.

In 2023, the journalist and former Arista employee Mitchell Cohen said people had taken the scandal too seriously, and noted that there was a "tradition" of comparable acts, such as the 1960s group the Crystals, who were "whoever Phil Spector said they were". The AllMusic writer Stephen Thomas Erlewine noted that many prior Europop acts had been figureheads rather than singers, and that lip-syncing was common in 1980s pop due to the emphasis on image and dance routines. He and Sheffield said no one had ever really believed Morvan and Pilatus were the singers.

Erlewine wrote that it was hard to imagine how such "transparent, lightweight, and intentionally disposable" music had created controversy. Sheffield argued that it was motivated by Milli Vanilli's androgyny and "flamboyant foreign-ness", and described the backlash as an "ugly eruption of racism, nativism, and homophobia" that the media covered with enthusiasm. He wrote that Milli Vanilli had become an "anti-pop cautionary tale", and that their "dirty-pop" style did not return until a decade later with acts such as Britney Spears, NSYNC and the Backstreet Boys. The Los Angeles Times journalist Meredith Blake observed that Morvan and Pilatus received most of the criticism while Farian and the Arista executives, including Clive Davis, "escaped largely unscathed". Korem said: "There's a bunch of white people that made the lion's share of the money. And then the people like Rob, Fab, Charles — they got kicked to the curb."

== Band members ==
- Fab Morvan
- Rob Pilatus (died 1998)

== Discography ==
=== Milli Vanilli ===
- All or Nothing (1988)
- Girl You Know It's True (1989)

=== The Real Milli Vanilli ===
- The Moment of Truth (1991)
