= Marteau =

Marteau is a French surname.

- Henri Marteau, French violinist and composer
- Robert Marteau, French poet
- Ottokar Fischer (full name Ottokar Fischer Marteau), Austrian magician

== See also ==
- Demarteau
