= Emanuelle Gattuso =

Canadian philanthropist

Emanuelle Gattuso CM is a prominent breast cancer survivor and Canadian philanthropist. She is the widow of late Canadian entrepreneur and philanthropist Allan Slaight. In partnership with her late husband, Gattuso has been recognized as a prominent philanthropic figure in Canada.
