= Dealt =

2017 American documentary film

- DVD cover
- Directed by: Luke Korem
- Written by: Luke Korem; Bradley Jackson
- Produced by: Luke Korem; Russell Wayne Groves; Bradley Jackson (co-producer); Andrew Shinjang Lee (co-producer)
- Starring: Richard Turner
- Cinematography: Jacob Hamilton
- Edited by: Derek Boonstra; Luke Korem
- Music by: Duncan Thum; Sebastian Örnemark
- Production companies: Keep On Running Pictures; Ralph Smyth Entertainment; White Stone Associates
- Distributed by: IFC Films/ Sundance Selects
- Release date: March 13, 2017 (South by Southwest)
- Running time: 85 minutes
- Country: United States
- Language: English

Dealt is a 2017 American documentary film directed by Luke Korem, about the life and career of Richard Turner, renowned as one of the world's greatest card magicians, though he is completely blind.

In the documentary, Richard traces his journey from his troubled childhood, when he began losing his vision, to present day as he relentlessly pursues perfection while struggling with the reality that his biggest weakness might also be his greatest strength. The film features extensive vérité footage of both Richard and his family as well as archive footage of Turner's many television appearances. The film features interviews with notable magicians including Turner, Johnny Thompson, Max Maven, Armando Lucero, and Jason England.

Dealt debuted at the 2017 South by Southwest Film Festival in competition where it won the Audience Award for Best Documentary Feature. Dealt went on to win four more audience awards and screened at festivals around the world including China and New Zealand. The film is distributed by IFC Films through Sundance Selects. In the US, the film can be viewed on Hulu, Amazon and iTunes. Internationally, it is available on Netflix.

== Critical response ==
Dealt received overwhelming positive reviews including a Critics Pick by the Los Angeles Times. Rotten Tomatoes reports a high score of 95%. LA Weekly and The Village Voice said the film is an "Illuminating, beautifully composed portrait". The New York Times said the subject is "Captivating. A dynamic personality", and Variety calls the film a "fascinating portrait of a blind card mechanic". Teller, of the famed magic duo Penn & Teller, said "Dealt knocked me dead. Turner and the tough love of his family won my heart. A great documentary." After its theatrical release, Dealt rose to #1 on the iTunes doc charts and was selected as their Editors' Choice.
