= Ottokar Fischer =

Austrian magician

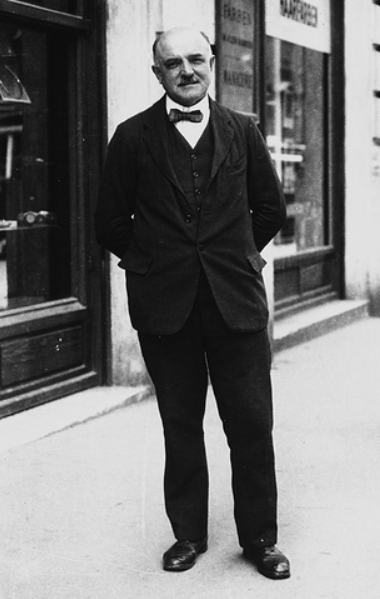
- Born: Ottokar Fischer; November 10, 1873; Leschan
- Died: December 1, 1940 (aged 67)
- Occupation: professional magician
- Known for: magic

Ottokar Fischer Marteau (November 10, 1873 – December 1, 1940), born Ottokar Fischer, was an Austrian magician.

== History ==
He was born in the small village of Leschan (Czech: Lešany) in Austrian Empire. In 1883 his parents moved to Vienna, where he saw Charles Obra, Mellini, Ben Ali Bey, and other noted performers. He gave his own first public performance at age 18. He billed himself as "O.F. Marteau".

In 1896 Fischer met George Heubeck, who was the successor of Johann Nepomuk Hofzinser, who taught him all of Hofzinser's effects. Fischer also previously had studied with A. Fredmar the only pupil of Compars Herrmann.

Fischer confessed that he did not find a lot of personal information about Hofzinser. He based his knowledge mainly on delivered stories and information by Hofzinser's friends and pupils and on detected letters and manuscripts as well as on several magic props of Hofzinser which he got from his friends.

Starting in 1898 he managed and appeared regularly at the Kratky Baschik theatre in Vienna, a magic theatre with nearly 1000 seats. For 12 years he performed daily with a two and a half-hour show of magic. Several times Fischer performed before the Imperial Court of Austria and before other crowned heads.

He performed for many years as a magician, before retiring after World War I to write a history of the art of magic.

Fischer was the founder of the "Wiener Magischer Klub" and its president for many years.

April 1936, was on cover of International Brotherhood of Magicians magazine 'The Linking Ring'.

In 1939 the Society of American Magicians made Fischer an honorary member.

== Published works ==
- J. N. Hofzinser's Card Conjuring - Kartenkünste (1910)
- Illustrated Magic (Das Wunderbuch der Zauberkunst) (1929) Translated into English by J. Barrows Mussey and Fulton Oursler. THis book was republished in Canada by Coles in 1980 under the same name, Illustrated Magic.
- Aus Eins mach Zehn... (ein Wiener Zauberbuch) (1933)
- The Magic of J.N. Hofzinser - J. N. Hofzinser Zauberkünste (1942) Translated into English by Richard Hatch

== See also ==
- Anton Kratky-Baschik (de)
- Card magic
- List of magicians
