= Demarteau =

Demarteau is a French surname. Notable people with the surname include:

- Gilles Demarteau (1722–1776), Belgian-French etcher, engraver, and art publisher
- Wilhelmus Demarteau (1917–2012), Dutch and Indonesian prelate of the Roman Catholic Church

== See also ==
- Marteau
