= Luke Korem =

American filmmaker (born 1982)

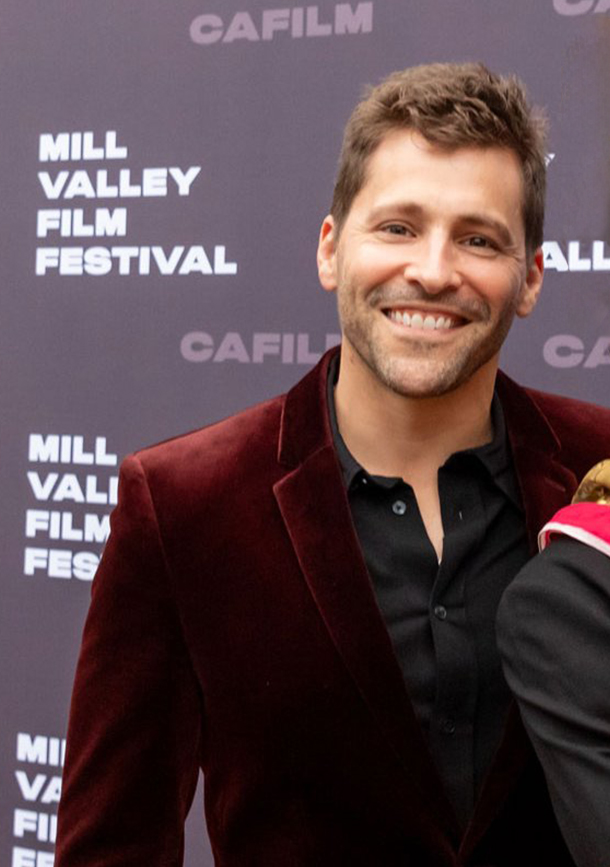
- Korem in 2023
- Born: Dallas, Texas, US
- Occupation: Filmmaker
- Years active: 2006–present

Luke Korem (born November 1, 1982) is an American filmmaker whose credits include directing and producing the critically acclaimed music documentary Milli Vanilli, the Showtime series Action, and the SXSW award-winning documentary Dealt. He produces under his production company banner, Keep On Running Pictures, based in Austin, Texas.

== Career ==
In 2017, Korem directed and produced Dealt, a documentary featuring the life and career of Richard Turner, renowned as one of the world's greatest card magicians, who is completely blind. Dealt premiered at the SXSW Film Festival, where it won the audience award for Best Documentary Feature. The film was sold to IFC Films / Sundance Selects for distribution and received critical acclaim, accumulating a score of 95% on Rotten Tomatoes. Variety wrote that the film is "fascinating and multifaceted"; Film Threat said, "Director Luke Korem masterfully tells this story"; and The Playlist wrote that Dealt achieves "a height few films manage to reach".

In 2019, Korem directed and executive-produced the four-part docuseries Action for Showtime. It explores the lives of professional gamblers and bookies as they navigate the landmark 1992 Supreme Court ruling lifting the ban on sports gambling in America. The series debuted on March 24, 2019, and received positive critical reviews. IndieWire wrote, "Action is a reminder that the margin between success and failure, like so many areas in this country in 2019, is slimmer than a lot of people pretend it is", and that the series "shows the agony and ecstasy of the multibillion dollar industry".

In June 2023, Korem's music documentary Milli Vanilli premiered at the Tribeca Film Festival, and it was released globally by Paramount+ in October of that year. The film received critical acclaim, including a critic's pick by The New York Times, Variety, and The Times (UK). Variety called it "a captivating and moving documentary", and The Daily Telegraph gave the film four stars and said it's "an absorbing blend of comedy and tragedy". The International Documentary Association awarded Milli Vanilli as one of the best music documentaries of the year. Milli Vanilli was produced by Korem's production company Keep On Running Pictures, in association with MRC and MTV Entertainment Studios.
