= Moontaxi Media =

Online music subscription service

Moontaxi Media Inc. was the first company in Canada to offer online music subscription services backed by licensing deals with major record labels in April 2002. In October 2003, the company would be the first to offer licensed music for sale in a digital format through its online store at Puretracks.com. Apple would launch its iTunes Music Store in Canada a year later in December 2004.

Founded in 2000 by Alistair Mitchell and Derek van der Plaat, Moontaxi started as an online stream hosting and music production company servicing radio stations such as JazzFM, i95.5, and EDGE 102.1; record companies, such as Universal Music and EMI, and brands such as The Beer Store, Park Hyatt Hotels and Air Canada. Moontaxi signed its first licensing deal with EMI Canada in December 2001 and launched its commercial web site around that time. The site made its channels search-able through the IE radio links as well as at the Windows Media web site and player driving tremendous traffic to its channels.

== Rise to Top Ten Online Music network in North America ==
By 2002 Moontaxi had licensing deals with Universal Music Canada, EMI Canada and Sony Canada to stream their songs on Moontaxi's Internet radio stations and later that year Moontaxi.com had grown to one of North America ’s most popular destination music streaming sites, featuring over 100 Internet music channels across a wide range of music genres.

== Launch of Puretracks and Pureradio ==
Moontaxi launched the Puretracks music download service in October 2003 accompanied by a national media campaign featuring eye-catching icons such as a baby in Kiss make-up and a lamb in a Madonna bustier. The service included content from all of the major record companies as well as numerous independent labels. The music format was a rights managed Windows Media Audio (WMA) CODEC mostly of 192 kbps compression quality. Prices started at $0.99 per song but would later range from $0.79 to $1.39 per song. Puretracks sold over 1 million songs in its first six months.

TELUS Radio

Puretracks' radio offering was white labeled as well and interactivity was added allowing listeners to mix various channels into a custom personalized channel and rate songs and artists on the player, thereby increasing or decreasing their rotation in the mix (a zero rating would eliminate the song from the playlist entirely).

== Prepaid Cards ==
The company sold prepaid cards in over 3,000 retail outlets and used them to promote Canadian artists such as k-os.

== Music Promotion ==
Puretracks ran an active consumer product promotional business providing free music downloads with consumer products.

== CD Burning Kiosks ==
Puretracks also placed music burning kiosks in music stores and clubs. The kiosks held several hundred thousand licensed songs that could be burned to a personalized CD.

CD Burning Kiosk: Puretracks CD burning kiosk in Horseshoe Tavern in Toronto.

== Sale to Bell Canada ==
In 2006 Moontaxi changed its name to Puretracks and a controlling stake was sold to Bell Canada.
