= Children's Own Museum =

Temporary museum in Toronto, Canada

The Children's Own Museum originally opened in 1997 as a temporary exhibit at the Harbourfront Centre in Toronto, Ontario, Canada. From 1998 to 2002, the museum operated in the former location of the McLaughlin Planetarium. In, the COM changed its name to the Children's Own Media Museum, developing content for schools and cultural centres across Ontario. The museum is led by Museum Director Che Marville and McLuhan Scholar Dr. Robert Logan. Currently the museum has no permanent facility and is seeking a new home, but has continued to operate special interactive workshops and programs, such as the 2012/2013 Family Programming at Harbourfront and 2009 program at the CN Tower. An October 2011 article at the Toronto Star's ParentCentral.ca website reported on a planned new venture called the Children's Mobile Media Museum, described as "a collaboration between the Children's Own Museum and the McLuhan Legacy Network, a group set up to promote the works of visionary Canadian icon Marshall McLuhan."
