= Mellini =

Mellini is an Italian surname. Notable people with the surname include:

- Clarissimo Falconieri Mellini (1794–1859), Italian Catholic cardinal and Camerlengo of the Sacred College of Cardinals
- Giovanni Battista Mellini (1405–1478), Italian Roman Catholic bishop and cardinal
- Giovanni Garzia Mellini (1562–1629), Italian Roman Catholic prelate, Camerlengo of the Sacred College of Cardinals
- Marie Azpiroz Mellini (1889–?), Spanish violinist
- Mauro Mellini (1927–2020), Italian lawyer and politician

== See also ==
- Mellini Chapel (Santa Maria del Popolo), chapel in the Church of Santa Maria del Popolo in Rome
- Ponte Mellini, small village (curazia) of San Marino
