= Shotgun clause =

A shotgun clause (or Texas Shootout Clause) is a term of art, rather than a legal term. It is a specific type of exit provision that may be included in a shareholders' agreement, and may often be referred to as a buy-sell agreement. The shotgun clause allows a shareholder to offer a specific price per share for the other shareholder(s)' shares; the other shareholder(s) must then either accept the offer or buy the offering shareholder's shares at that price per share.

== Discussion ==
Typically, an exit clause is triggered in situations where a business partnership has severely deteriorated, and so the situation is often likened to a divorce. In the same way that drawn-out battles between a splitting couple can often leave children with emotional damage, so too can a business be damaged by drawn-out fighting between its owners. For this reason, experts in the area emphasize the importance of including an exit clause in a firm's shareholders' agreement in order to minimize the negative impact of a business-divorce. As with a prenuptial agreement, it is important to set out an exit clause early on in a business relationship when interests are still aligned and partners still like each other, as it may be difficult to settle on the terms of such exit, once the relationship has gone sour.

Shotgun clauses protect the interests of both or all parties regardless of their stake in the company. If one party decides to trigger the clause, it is in their best interest to make a well considered, fair offer - for if they make a low offer, their partner(s) may raise the resources to turn the offer against them, a counteroffer they would be bound to accept.

== Process ==
The shareholder triggering the clause offers to buy the shares of the others at a specific price per share. The other shareholder(s) must then either accept the offer and sell their shares, or buy the triggering shareholders' shares at that same price. Alternatively, the clause can be structured so that the triggering shareholder offers to sell his shares at a specific price per share, and the other shareholders can then accept the offer or sell their shares to the triggering shareholder at the set price.

The timeline is generally very short, although there are no hard and fast rules. It would not be unusual to have 20 to 40 days to elect to sell or buy, and another 20 to 40 days to close. If the recipient of the offer does not respond in the allotted period of time, the offer is assumed to have been accepted.

== Rationale ==
The clause is most applicable when both partners want to run the company, but not together, and an amicable buy-out cannot be reached. It serves as a sort of last resort method for solving these disputes, while also helping to ensure that a fair price is offered. When triggering a shotgun clause, the offering partner does not know whether they will end up buying or selling their shares, so the individual must – in theory – pick a price that they would find acceptable in either outcome, thus preventing large over- or under-valuations of the firm.

== Financing ==
Shotgun clauses tend to favour people with cash readily available. Once a shotgun clause has been triggered, shareholders can often face difficulties obtaining traditional financing in order to buy the other shareholders' shares, due largely to the very short timeline of the transaction. Financing commitments from traditional banks typically take too long to obtain, and lenders often avoid situations where management conflicts are likely to disrupt the business. This means that owners facing a triggered shotgun clause are often forced to rely on their own resources if they wish to fend off being bought out. However, there are some private equity and venture capital firms that specialize in providing capital for shotgun situations.

== Economics ==
In academic circles it has been argued that, under certain circumstances, these clauses are not economically efficient in that the partner who values the company most is not always the one that ends up buying the company. De Frutos and Kittsteiner suggest in their paper that in order to ensure an efficient outcome, there should not be a contractual obligation for the party who triggers the clause to name the price. Instead, they advocate including in the termination agreement a clause stating that the parties will negotiate for the right to be the person who chooses whether to buy or sell at the price specified by the other partner. They suggest that this negotiation take the form of an ascending auction where the shareholders bid for the right not to set the price per share. Each partner raises his/her bid continuously, but either partner can drop out of the auction at any time. The party that drops out becomes the one who must propose the price per share, but that person receives a payment from the other partner equal to the bid at which the auction ended.
