= Tina Lenert =

American magician, mime and harpist

- Born: June 6, 1948 (age 77); Caracas, Venezuela
- Occupation(s): Magician, mime, harpist
- Spouse: Mike Caveney (22 April 1979–present)

Tina Lenert (born June 6, 1948) is an American magician, mime and harpist. She has performed worldwide and is known for combining elements of pantomime and magic. For many years she has been a regular performer at the world-famous Magic Castle in Hollywood, where she has been voted Stage Magician of the Year by the Academy of Magical Arts.

== Early life ==
Lenert grew up in Caracas, Venezuela. Her father was a geologist working for a United States oil company and at a young age her family moved to Malibu, California. She learned how to play electric guitar in high school as part of the short lived female rock band, the Leftovers. Shortly after high school, she began her career as a classical guitarist, and upon completing college studies as a performance major, abandoned the instrument and achieved success as a mime (she was a founding member of the L. A. Mime Company) and then as an award-winning magician. Lenert combined mime and magic to create the fantasy magic act she is famous for today, Mopman.

== Personal life ==
Lenert lives in Pasadena, California, with her husband Mike Caveney, a magician and magic historian. The couple married on April 22, 1977.
