= Vincent Foy =

Canadian Roman Catholic cleric and theologian

The Reverend Monsignor Vincent Foy
- Born: Vincent Nicholas Foy; 14 August 1915; Toronto, Ontario, Canada
- Died: 13 March 2017 (aged 101)

Ecclesiastical career
- Religion: Christianity
- Church: Roman Catholic Church
- Ordained: June 3, 1939
- Writings: Did Pope Paul Approve the Winnipeg Statement: A Search for Truth (1997)
- Congregations served: St. John’s Parish, Toronto (1966-1973); Holy Martyrs Church, Bradford; St. Patrick’s Church, Phelpston
- Offices held: Canon lawyer of the Archdiocese of Toronto; Vice-Chancellor of the Archdicoese of Toronto; Secretary of the Toronto Archdiocesan Matrimonial Tribunal; Secretary of the new Toronto Regional Tribunal; Presiding Judge of the Toronto Regional and Archdiocesan Tribunals; Director of Catechetics of the Archdiocese of Toronto
- Website: msgrfoy.wordpress.com

Vincent Nicholas Foy (14 August 1915 – 13 March 2017) was a Canadian Roman Catholic cleric and theologian.

He consistently wrote and taught on the intrinsic evil of artificial contraception, and strongly upheld Pope Paul VI's encyclical Humanae vitae when the Canadian Conference of Catholic Bishops issued the Winnipeg Statement.

He was the head of Toronto's archdiocesan marriage tribunal. Rev. Msgr. Vincent Foy died in March 2017 at the age of 101.

Msgr. Foy was canon lawyer of the Archdiocese of Toronto. He was born in Toronto, Ontario on August 14, 1915, second of a family of eight children. He attended Holy Name Catholic Elementary School and De La Salle High School in Toronto. In 1933 he entered St. Augustine’s Seminary and was ordained on June 3, 1939 by Archbishop, later Cardinal McGuigan. He was sent for post-graduate studies to Laval University in Quebec City where he took a doctoral course in Canon Law. In 1942, he was appointed Vice-Chancellor of the Archdicoese of Toronto and Secretary of the Toronto Archdiocesan Matrimonial Tribunal. In 1947, he was named the Secretary of the new Toronto Regional Tribunal, which he served later as Defender of the Bond and Judge. In 1957, he was named Presiding Judge of the Regional and Archdiocesan Tribunals. In the same year, he was named a Domestic Prelate by Pope Pius XII. In a part time capacity for many years, he was Director of Catechetics of the Archdiocese of Toronto.

He is a founder and honorary member of the Canadian Canon Law Society.

He was named pastor of his natal parish of St. John’s in Toronto in 1966 and was there until 1973. He then served as pastor of Holy Martyrs Church in Bradford and St. Patrick’s Church in Phelpston. In 1977 and 1978 he lived in Rome in an advocacy capacity. He served as chaplain for 25 years of the Pro Aliis Club and was chaplain also of the Legion of Mary, has helped religious orders and convents and been active in other groups including the Fellowship of Catholic Scholars.

On June 3, 2016, he celebrated his 77th year of his ordination to the holy priesthood and on August 14, 2016, he celebrated his 101st birthday. He was the last surviving priest of the class of 1939 of St. Augustine’s Seminary.

For decades he has fearlessly articulated and defended the teachings of the Church – in a time of moral and doctrinal chaos in the Church in Canada. He is best known for his untiring defense of Catholic teachings on marriage and family life, Pope Paul VI’s encyclical Humanae vitae. His efforts have earned him a papal commendation and the Pro-life Man of the Year Award.

According to records sought and obtained from nationwide diocesan archives before his death on March 13, 2017, Rev. Msgr. Vincent Foy, having lived a life of heroic sanctity, set records as the longest ordained and oldest diocesan priest in the history of the Archdiocese of Toronto and the longest ordained English-speaking diocesan priest, monsignor, and canon lawyer in the history of the Canada; and worldwide, four served longer.

== Bibliography ==
- Did Pope Paul Approve the Winnipeg Statement: A Search for Truth, Life Ethics Information Centre, Toronto (1997)
