= Mike Caveney =

American magician, author, publisher, magic historian and collector

- Born: Michael Douglas Caveney; June 17, 1950 (age 75); Los Angeles County, California, United States
- Occupations: Magician, illusionist, Author
- Notable work: Harry Anderson: Wise Guy
- Spouse: Tina Lenert (April 22, 1979–present)
- Website: Official website

Michael Douglas Caveney (born June 17, 1950) is an American magician, author, publisher, magic historian and collector. He is a life-member of the Magic Castle in Hollywood and a member of The Magic Circle of London. His work as a magician and publisher spans over four decades. He has appeared onstage or on TV in more than 20 countries worldwide and most of the 50 States.

== Life and career ==
Caveney was raised in the San Gabriel Valley, California. He discovered magic at age nine and as a pre-teen worked for Owen Magic Supreme, where he was paid in magic apparatus. He was a member of the Long Beach Mystics, a club for young magicians, founded in 1955 in Long Beach, California. The club met regularly in the backroom of Brownies Hobby and Magic Shop and produced a myriad of professional magicians including Michael Weber, Stan Allen, Kevin James and Dana Daniels. In 2005, a documentary about the Mystics was created to celebrate the 50th anniversary of the organization.

In 1995 he received the "John Nevil Maskelyne Award" for literature by the Magic Circle of London. Four years later he was awarded the "Literary Fellowship Award" by the Academy of Magical Arts at the Magic Castle. In 2006, he was voted "Stage Magician of the Year" and has been nominated as "Lecturer of the Year" several times by that same organization. In 2010, Caveney received a Special Award for History, Research and Scholarship from FISM.

He is co-organizer and host of the Los Angeles Conference on Magic History, a biennial invitation-only conference to showcase historical magic. The conference is co-hosted by Ricky Jay, John Gaughan and Jim Steinmeyer. As a magic historian, he was featured on A&E's 1997 "Story of Magic", hosted by Ricky Jay.

== Author and publisher ==
Since 1979, Caveney has published over 50 titles on the theory, practice and history of magic.

His biographical works include Kellar’s Wonders (2003) with Bill Miesel, and Carter the Great (1995). In 2010 he co-authored, Magic, 1400s-1950s for Taschen Books. He is also a contributing editor to MAGIC - The Independent Magazine for Magicians. He recently published a book of his life's work titled Mike Caveney Wonders.

== Personal life ==
Caveney lives in Pasadena, California with his wife Tina Lenert, a magician, mime and harpist. The couple married on April 22, 1979.
