= Charles Reynolds (magician) =

American magician

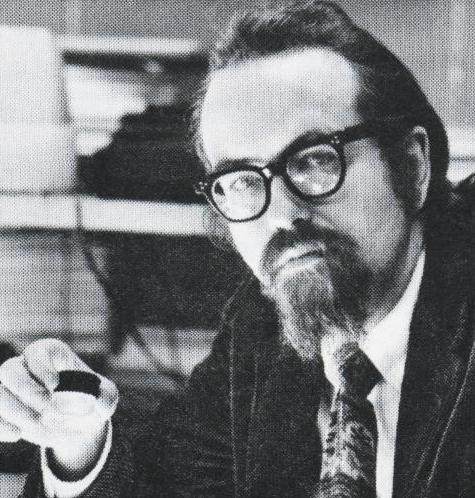
- Reynolds circa 1976
- Born: Charles Raymond Reynolds; September 9, 1932; Toledo, Ohio, U.S.
- Died: November 4, 2010 (aged 78); Greenwich Village, New York, New York, U.S.
- Education: University of Michigan
- Occupations: Magician, journalist

Charles Raymond Reynolds (September 9, 1932 – November 4, 2010) was a behind-the-scenes magician involved with virtually every element of magic production — inventing illusions, producing and direction of magic acts, helping performers perfect their acts, and writing on the subject.

Reynolds was born in Toledo, Ohio, and as a child, he saw Harry Blackstone, Sr. perform. Reynolds was immediately drawn to magic, starting with a Gilbert Mysto Kit.

He majored in theater at the University of Michigan, and earned his master's degree there, too. He undertook a number of jobs in media and journalism. Charles met Doug Henning while writing an article on magic, and Henning hired him as a consultant. He was chief magic consultant for Henning's popular network TV magic shows, which ran from 1975 for nearly a decade. He did other work with Henning, including Merlin.

Charles also worked frequently with Harry Blackstone, Jr., the son of his childhood hero. He designed numerous illusions for Blackstone, Jr., including assisting him in cutting his wife in half with a buzz saw for the Broadway production of Blackstone!, and creating a new levitation illusion for a live show in Las Vegas.

He invented two different ways to make an elephant vanish, and made a horse and rider disappear.

Charles produced and directed productions all over the world and in various media — live, film, and television, wrote and co-wrote extensively on magic, collected notable magic memorabilia, and lectured at the Smithsonian.

He died of liver cancer at the age of 78 at his (Greenwich Village, New York County, New York, United States) home. He was survived by his wife Regina.

== See also ==
- Schindler, George (November 5, 2010). "Broken Wand - Charles Reynolds (Raymond), MIMC". Magic New Zealand.
- M Levent (November 4, 2010). "BROKEN WAND :: CHARLES REYNOLDS". The Magic Newsire.
- Martin, Douglas (August 6, 1988). "About New York; We're Off to See A Wizard, Only He's Not Talking". The New York Times.
