= Johann Nepomuk Hofzinser =

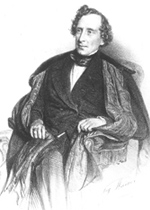
- Born: 19 June 1806
- Died: 11 March 1875 (aged 68)

Johann Nepomuk Hofzinser (19 June 1806 – 11 March 1875) was an Austrian-Hungarian magician and illusionist. He used the moniker "Dr. Hofzinser" as a stage name after retiring in 1865.

While he was a conjuror, Hofzinser became well known for his inventions, in particular his automata, as well as for card manipulation.

== Early life ==
Hofzinser was born in Landstraße in Wien, the youngest of four boys. His father Leopold Hofzinser (+1817) was an affluent businessman who owned a silk shop in Graben.The family had originated in Swabia. His mother, Maria Theresia Magdalene, was the daughter of a tailor.

The family were distantly related to the Döbler family and Ludwig Döbler, who would also go on to become a magician.

As young man, Hofzinser worked in his fathers shop, but after completing his studies and obtaining his PhD at university, he entered the Austrian civil service.

He married Wilhelmine Bergmann (1827-1900) in 1854.

Ottokar Fischer spread the story that upon his death in 1875, Hofzinser's wife destroyed many of his manuscripts to honor her husband's instructions, though there is some dispute about this. As a result, it is generally thought that many of his mechanical plans and card-handling methods may forever remain a secret. Several of Hofzinser's pupils preserved portions of his notes and instructions. There are approximately 270 manuscripts and letters of his and his pupils in various collections.

Among his pupils were George Heubeck

== In popular culture ==
He is portrayed by Philip McGough, in the 2006 movie The Illusionist, starring Edward Norton, Jessica Biel and Paul Giamatti.

== Legacy ==
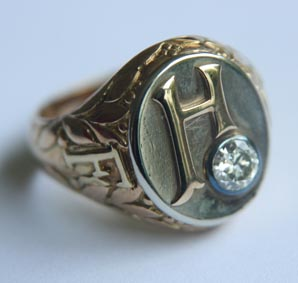

=== The Hofzinser ring ===
The Hofzinser ring was an award for magicians created in 1933 in memory of Hofzinser. The first recipient of the ring was Ottokar Fischer who had dedicated his life to researching the history of magic and in particular the work of Hofzinser in Das Wunderbuch der Zauberkunst (1929) och J.N. Hofzinsers Kartenkünste (1910).

=== Max Hofzinser ===
A 20th century Swedish illusionist who took the stage name in honor of Hofzinser.
