= Richard Turner (magician) =

American expert card mechanic (born 1954)

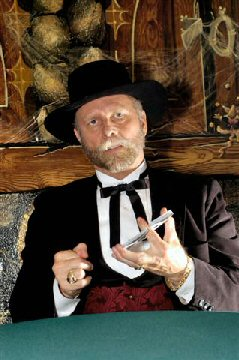
- Born: Richard Edward Turner; June 16, 1954 (age 72); San Diego, California
- Occupations: Card mechanic, card manipulator
- Spouse: Kim Turner
- Children: 1
- Website: Official website

Richard Edward Turner (born June 16, 1954) is an American expert card mechanic who is known for his card trick performances. He was the subject of the documentary Dealt.

== Early life ==
Turner was born in San Diego in 1954, which he dubbed "the year of the full deck" (referring to a standard 52-card deck of playing cards, plus the two jokers). At the age of seven, he became infatuated with the television show Maverick.

His eyesight began failing at the age of nine following his recovery from a bout with scarlet fever. The macula of each of Turner's eyes was completely destroyed, preventing forward vision. By the age of thirteen, his vision deteriorated to 20/400; over the years, what little vision Turner possessed gradually deteriorated to the point where he presently can no longer distinguish between a fully lit room and total darkness.

Turner attended a special school for the visually impaired in Santee, California, where he refused to learn Braille. His younger brother, David, had been taking karate lessons for nine months and invited Turner to accompany him. He began karate lessons in 1971 under the tutelage of Master John Murphy, the United States' founder of Wado-Kai, a Japanese hard-style karate. He was good at it and began training at Gene Fisher's Gym, eventually earning a sixth-degree black belt in Wado-Kai karate.

In 1972, Turner auditioned for a small non-profit San Diego Christian theater operated by television actor Steve Terrell, and he performed for six years with the "Lamb's Players Theatre". Terrell taught Turner how to look people in the eye so that they would not know of his visual impairment.

He was later introduced to stuntman Bobby Yerkes, who taught him to swing on the trapeze, walk a tight rope, and take high falls.

== Career ==
Turner's demonstrations have been featured on television programs, including That's Incredible!, Ripley's Believe It Or Not, The 700 Club, five appearances on Japanese programs, including World Geniuses, and on Great Britain's The Paul Daniels Magic Show. He has conducted motivational lectures for international corporations and government agencies and created and performed a family entertainment program for schoolchildren, featuring a comedy routine co-starring his wife as schoolmarm "Miss Guided", his assistant.

Turner performed his 19th-century riverboat gambler's act as "The Cheat" in various venues:

- While building his persona, he would present five days a week aboard the Reuben E. Lee Riverboat-themed restaurant in San Diego, California, once logging 2,190 consecutive days
- Entertained VIPs for four years at Billy Bob's in Fort Worth, Texas
- Served seven years as Ambassador and Featured Performer at Six Flags Fiesta Texas
- Nine years at the Buckhorn Saloon & Museum in downtown San Antonio, Texas
- Demonstrated his skills at business expositions, magic conventions, private parties, and as a performing member since 1975 at the Magic Castle, where he was inducted into the Hall of Fame.
- He fooled Penn and Teller with a card trick on their television program Fool Us in 2017.

Turner's audiences have included Jimmy Stewart, Gene Kelly, Johnny Carson, Bob Hope, Muhammad Ali, and Secretary of State Colin Powell, who joined Turner and his wife at one of their school programs. Turner auditioned for and was hired by his employers without revealing his visual impairment, and he never informs his audiences he is blind.

The United States Playing Card Company employs his services as a "touch analyst" to evaluate the texture, flexibility, and cut of dozens of decks of cards each year.

Although semi-retired, Turner appears several weeks a year at The Magic Castle, performs his act and presents lectures to his peers, and performs at private parties at the Buckhorn Saloon & Museum in his hometown of San Antonio, Texas. He has also appeared in a Penguin Live lecture where he details some of the work on his award-winning false dealing.

In 2008, he toured as part of a stage show called Hoodwinked with Todd Robbins, Bob Arno, and Banachek.

In 2010, Turner was asked by director Terrence Malick to cheat Brad Pitt's character at the blackjack table in the film The Tree of Life.

Screening in theatres in 2024, the documentary Lost In The Shuffle sees Shawn Farquhar explore the centuries-old mysteries hidden in a deck of cards while visiting fellow magicians, including Turner, to explore their favourite card tricks.

== Personal life ==
Turner is married to Kim Turner (née Miller). They have a son.

When Turner was eleven years old, he created a puzzle game called Batty, inspired by the game Tower of Hanoi. In May 2011, he released his fourth version. Batty features eleven levels of difficulty, ranging from an uncomplicated Level 3 through the extremely complex Level 11. While a Level 3 can be resolved by an elementary school student in six or seven moves, mastering Level 11 demands far greater mathematical acumen, requiring between 1,023 and 2,047 moves without a single mistake.
