= List of number-one hits of 1997 (Austria) =

This is a list of the Austrian Singles Chart number-one hits of 1997.

Issue date	Song	Artist
5 January	"Quit Playing Games (With My Heart)"	Backstreet Boys
12 January	"Quit Playing Games (With My Heart)"	Backstreet Boys
19 January	"Un-Break My Heart"	Toni Braxton
26 January	"Time to Say Goodbye (Con te partirò)"	Sarah Brightman and Andrea Bocelli
2 February	"Time to Say Goodbye (Con te partirò)"	Sarah Brightman and Andrea Bocelli
9 February	"Time to Say Goodbye (Con te partirò)"	Sarah Brightman and Andrea Bocelli
16 February	"When I Die"	No Mercy
23 February	"When I Die"	No Mercy
2 March	"When I Die"	No Mercy
9 March	"When I Die"	No Mercy
16 March	"When I Die"	No Mercy
23 March	"When I Die"	No Mercy
30 March	"When I Die"	No Mercy
6 April	"Warum?"	Tic Tac Toe
13 April	"Warum?"	Tic Tac Toe
20 April	"Warum?"	Tic Tac Toe
27 April	"Warum?"	Tic Tac Toe
4 May	"Blond"	Rainhard Fendrich
11 May	"Blond"	Rainhard Fendrich
18 May	"Mama"	Spice Girls
25 May	"Blond"	Rainhard Fendrich
1 June	"Blond"	Rainhard Fendrich
8 June	"Blond"	Rainhard Fendrich
15 June	"Blond"	Rainhard Fendrich
22 June	"Blond"	Rainhard Fendrich
29 June	"MMMBop"	Hanson
6 July	"MMMBop"	Hanson
13 July	"MMMBop"	Hanson
20 July	"I'll Be Missing You"	Puff Daddy and Faith Evans featuring 112
27 July	"I'll Be Missing You"	Puff Daddy and Faith Evans featuring 112
3 August	"I'll Be Missing You"	Puff Daddy and Faith Evans featuring 112
10 August	"I'll Be Missing You"	Puff Daddy and Faith Evans featuring 112
17 August	"I'll Be Missing You"	Puff Daddy and Faith Evans featuring 112
24 August	"I'll Be Missing You"	Puff Daddy and Faith Evans featuring 112
31 August	"I'll Be Missing You"	Puff Daddy and Faith Evans featuring 112
7 September	"I'll Be Missing You"	Puff Daddy and Faith Evans featuring 112
14 September	"I'll Be Missing You"	Puff Daddy and Faith Evans featuring 112
21 September	"I'll Be Missing You"	Puff Daddy and Faith Evans featuring 112
28 September	"Something About the Way You Look Tonight" / "Candle in the Wind 1997"	Elton John
5 October	"Something About the Way You Look Tonight" / "Candle in the Wind 1997"	Elton John
12 October	"Something About the Way You Look Tonight" / "Candle in the Wind 1997"	Elton John
19 October	"Something About the Way You Look Tonight" / "Candle in the Wind 1997"	Elton John
26 October	"Something About the Way You Look Tonight" / "Candle in the Wind 1997"	Elton John
2 November	"Something About the Way You Look Tonight" / "Candle in the Wind 1997"	Elton John
9 November	"Something About the Way You Look Tonight" / "Candle in the Wind 1997"	Elton John
16 November	"Something About the Way You Look Tonight" / "Candle in the Wind 1997"	Elton John
23 November	"Something About the Way You Look Tonight" / "Candle in the Wind 1997"	Elton John
30 November	"Something About the Way You Look Tonight" / "Candle in the Wind 1997"	Elton John
7 December	"Something About the Way You Look Tonight" / "Candle in the Wind 1997"	Elton John
14 December	"Something About the Way You Look Tonight" / "Candle in the Wind 1997"	Elton John
21 December	"Something About the Way You Look Tonight" / "Candle in the Wind 1997"	Elton John
28 December	"Something About the Way You Look Tonight" / "Candle in the Wind 1997"	Elton John

== See also ==
- 1997 in music
