= List of number-one singles of the 1990s (Switzerland) =

This is a list of singles that reached number one on the Swiss Hitparade during the 1990s by week each reached the top of the chart.

== Number-one singles ==
Key
†	Number-one single of the year

Issue date	Song	Artist	Weeks at number one
1990
4 February	"Another Day in Paradise"	Phil Collins	1
11 February	"Girl I'm Gonna Miss You"	Milli Vanilli	1
18 February	"Get Up! (Before the Night Is Over)"	Technotronic	1
25 February	"Nothing Compares 2 U"	Sinéad O'Connor	10
6 May	"The Power"	Snap!	4
3 June	"Black Velvet"	Alannah Myles	4
1 July	"Un'estate italiana"†	Edoardo Bennato and Gianna Nannini	1
8 July	"Verdammt - ich lieb' dich"	Matthias Reim	13
7 October	"It Must Have Been Love"	Roxette	2
21 October	"Tom's Diner"	DNA featuring Suzanne Vega	1
28 October	"It Must Have Been Love"	Roxette	1
4 November	"I've Been Thinking About You"	Londonbeat	6
16 December	"Sadeness Part I"	Enigma	11
1991
3 March	"Gonna Make You Sweat (Everybody Dance Now)"	C+C Music Factory featuring Freedom Williams	1
10 March	"Crazy"	Seal	4
7 April	"Joyride"	Roxette	7
26 May	"Wind of Change"†	Scorpions	1
2 June	"Joyride"	Roxette	1
9 June	"Wind of Change"†	Scorpions	1
16 June	"Ring Ring Ring (Ha Ha Hey)"	De La Soul	1
23 June	"Wind of Change"†	Scorpions	1
30 June	"Ring Ring Ring (Ha Ha Hey)"	De La Soul	1
7 July	"Wind of Change"†	Scorpions	2
21 July	"Gypsy Woman (She's Homeless)"	Crystal Waters	2
4 August	"(Everything I Do) I Do It for You"	Bryan Adams	15
17 November	"Good Vibrations"	Marky Mark and the Funky Bunch featuring Loleatta Holloway	1
24 November	"(Everything I Do) I Do It for You"	Bryan Adams	1
1 December	"Black or White"	Michael Jackson	7
1992
19 January	"Let's Talk About Sex"	Salt-n-Pepa	1
26 January	"Don't Let the Sun Go Down on Me"	Elton John and George Michael	6
8 March	"Das Boot"	U 96	8
3 May	"To Be with You"	Mr. Big	7
21 June	"Jump"	Kris Kross	1
28 June	"Rhythm Is a Dancer"	Snap!	14
4 October	"Sweat (A La La La La Long)"	Inner Circle	6
15 November	"Don't You Want Me"	Felix	4
13 December	"Die da!?"	Die Fantastischen Vier	5
1993
17 January	"I Will Always Love You"	Whitney Houston	8
14 March	"Somebody Dance with Me"†	DJ Bobo	1
21 March	"No Limit"	2 Unlimited	5
25 April	"All That She Wants"	Ace of Base	2
9 May	"Informer"	Snow	5
13 June	"What Is Love"	Haddaway	5
18 July	"Mr. Vain"	Culture Beat	4
15 August	"What's Up?"	4 Non Blondes	14
21 November	"I'd Do Anything for Love (But I Won't Do That)"	Meat Loaf	9
1994
23 January	"U Got 2 Let the Music"	Cappella	2
6 February	"All for Love"	Bryan Adams, Rod Stewart and Sting	5
13 March	"Move on Baby"	Cappella	3
3 April	"It's Alright"	East 17	2
17 April	"Without You"†	Mariah Carey	7
5 June	"The Most Beautiful Girl in the World"	Prince	2
19 June	"Without You"†	Mariah Carey	3
10 July	"Freude herrscht (ohne Wenn und Aber)"	DJ Igo	1
17 July	"7 Seconds"	Youssou N'Dour and Neneh Cherry	2
31 July	"I Swear"	All-4-One	12
23 October	"Let the Dream Come True"	DJ Bobo	2
6 November	"Saturday Night"	Whigfield	1
13 November	"Always"	Bon Jovi	1
20 November	"Secret"	Madonna	1
27 November	"Cotton Eye Joe"	Rednex	14
1995
5 March	"Conquest of Paradise"	Vangelis	8
30 April	"Scatman (Ski Ba Bop Ba Dop Bop)"	Scatman John	9
2 July	"Have You Ever Really Loved a Woman?"†	Bryan Adams	2
16 July	"Wish You Were Here"	Rednex	11
1 October	"You Are Not Alone"	Michael Jackson	1
8 October	"Waterfalls"	TLC	1
15 October	"You Are Not Alone"	Michael Jackson	2
29 October	"Waterfalls"	TLC	1
5 November	"Gangsta's Paradise"	Coolio featuring L.V.	5
10 December	"Earth Song"	Michael Jackson	1
17 December	"Gangsta's Paradise"	Coolio featuring L.V.	1
24 December	"Earth Song"	Michael Jackson	4
1996
21 January	"Gangsta's Paradise"	Coolio featuring L.V.	4
18 February	"Children"	Robert Miles	12
12 May	"Macarena"†	Los Del Rio	1
19 May	"Children"	Robert Miles	1
26 May	"Macarena"†	Los Del Rio	1
2 June	"Coco Jamboo"	Mr. President	1
9 June	"Macarena"†	Los Del Rio	1
16 June	"Coco Jamboo"	Mr. President	1
23 June	"Macarena"†	Los Del Rio	1
30 June	"Coco Jamboo"	Mr. President	2
14 July	"Killing Me Softly"	The Fugees	2
28 July	"I Can't Help Myself (I Love You, I Want You)"	The Kelly Family	1
4 August	"Killing Me Softly"	The Fugees	3
25 August	"Insomnia"	Faithless	1
1 September	"Killing Me Softly"	The Fugees	2
15 September	"Wannabe"	Spice Girls	5
20 October	"Salva Mea"	Faithless	2
3 November	"Zehn kleine Jägermeister"	Die Toten Hosen	3
24 November	"Quit Playing Games (With My Heart)"	Backstreet Boys	3
15 December	"Verpiss' dich"	Tic Tac Toe	3
1997
5 January	"Un-Break My Heart"	Toni Braxton	2
19 January	"Time to Say Goodbye (Con te partirò)"†	Sarah Brightman and Andrea Bocelli	6
2 March	"Don't Speak"	No Doubt	4
30 March	"Warum?"	Tic Tac Toe	4
27 April	"I Believe I Can Fly"	R. Kelly	6
8 June	"Lonely"	Nana	1
15 June	"Vivo per lei – Ich lebe für sie"	Andrea Bocelli and Judy Weiss	1
22 June	"MMMBop"	Hanson	4
20 July	"I'll Be Missing You"	Puff Daddy and Faith Evans featuring 112	8
14 September	"Men in Black"	Will Smith	1
21 September	"Something About the Way You Look Tonight" / "Candle in the Wind 1997"	Elton John	10
30 November	"Barbie Girl"	Aqua	6
1998
11 January	"Something About the Way You Look Tonight" / "Candle in the Wind 1997"	Elton John	1
18 January	"It's Like That"	Run-D.M.C. vs. Jason Nevins	3
8 February	"My Heart Will Go on"†	Celine Dion	15
24 May	"Ein Schwein namens Männer"	Die Ärzte	2
7 June	"Stand by Me"	4 the Cause	1
14 June	"Ein Schwein namens Männer"	Die Ärzte	1
21 June	"Stand by Me"	4 the Cause	3
12 July	"La copa de la vida"	Ricky Martin	1
19 July	"Bailando"	Loona	3
9 August	"Ghetto Supastar (That Is What You Are)"	Pras Michel featuring ODB & introducing Mýa	5
13 September	"I Don't Want to Miss a Thing"	Aerosmith	6
25 October	"Flugzeuge im Bauch"	Oli P.	6
6 December	"Believe"	Cher	4
1999
10 January	"Big Big World"	Emilia	9
14 March	"...Baby One More Time"	Britney Spears	9
16 May	"I Want It That Way"	Backstreet Boys	3
6 June	"Mambo No 5 (a Little Bit of...)"†	Lou Bega	11
22 August	"Blue (Da Ba Dee)"	Eiffel 65	11
7 November	"So bist du (und wenn Du gehst...)"	Oli P.	5
12 December	"If I Could Turn Back the Hands of Time"	R. Kelly	9

== See also ==
- 1990s in music
