= List of number-one hits of 1997 (Germany) =

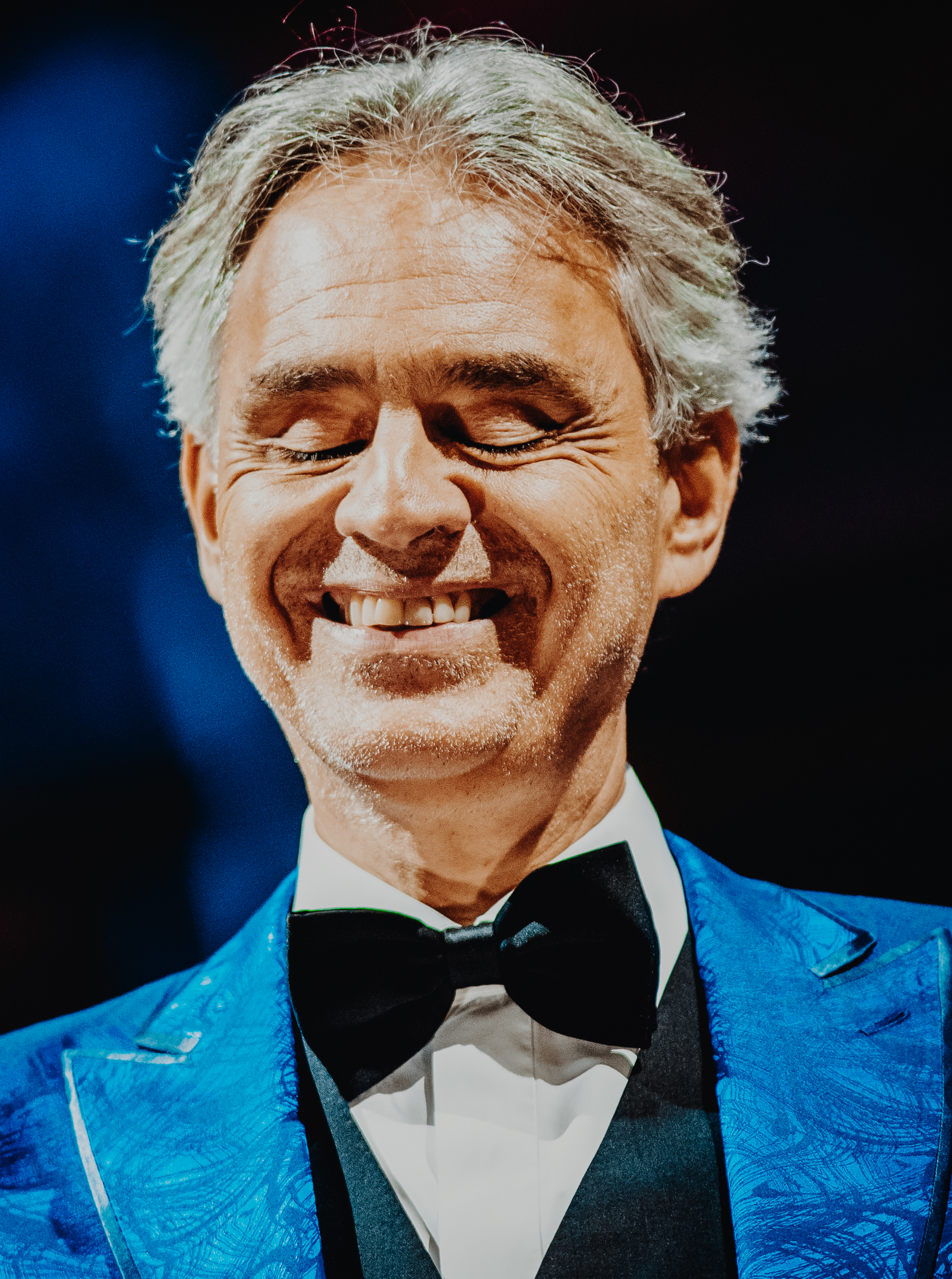
Andrea Bocelli's (pictured) "Bocelli" and "Time to Say Goodbye" became the best performing-album and single of the year respectively.

This is a list of the German Media Control Top100 Singles Chart number-ones of 1997.

== Number-one hits by week ==
Key
| † | Indicates best-performing single and album of 1997 |

| Issue date | Song | Artist | Ref. | Album | Artist | Ref. |
|---|---|---|---|---|---|---|
| 6 January | "Time to Say Goodbye"† | Andrea Bocelli and Sarah Brightman | | Bocelli † | Andrea Bocelli | |
| 13 January | "Time to Say Goodbye"† | Andrea Bocelli and Sarah Brightman | | Bocelli † | Andrea Bocelli | |
| 20 January | "Time to Say Goodbye"† | Andrea Bocelli and Sarah Brightman | | Bocelli † | Andrea Bocelli | |
| 27 January | "Time to Say Goodbye"† | Andrea Bocelli and Sarah Brightman | | Bocelli † | Andrea Bocelli | |
| 3 February | "Time to Say Goodbye"† | Andrea Bocelli and Sarah Brightman | | Bocelli † | Andrea Bocelli | |
| 10 February | "Time to Say Goodbye"† | Andrea Bocelli and Sarah Brightman | | Bocelli † | Andrea Bocelli | |
| 17 February | "Time to Say Goodbye"† | Andrea Bocelli and Sarah Brightman | | Bocelli † | Andrea Bocelli | |
| 24 February | "Time to Say Goodbye"† | Andrea Bocelli and Sarah Brightman | | Bocelli † | Andrea Bocelli | |
| 3 March | "Time to Say Goodbye"† | Andrea Bocelli and Sarah Brightman | | Bocelli † | Andrea Bocelli | |
| 10 March | "Time to Say Goodbye"† | Andrea Bocelli and Sarah Brightman | | Bocelli † | Andrea Bocelli | |
| 17 March | "Warum?" | Tic Tac Toe | | Pop | U2 | |
| 24 March | "Warum?" | Tic Tac Toe | | Bocelli † | Andrea Bocelli | |
| 31 March | "Warum?" | Tic Tac Toe | | Bocelli † | Andrea Bocelli | |
| 7 April | "Warum?" | Tic Tac Toe | | Bocelli † | Andrea Bocelli | |
| 14 April | "Warum?" | Tic Tac Toe | | Bocelli † | Andrea Bocelli | |
| 21 April | "Warum?" | Tic Tac Toe | | Bocelli † | Andrea Bocelli | |
| 28 April | "Warum?" | Tic Tac Toe | | Ultra | Depeche Mode | |
| 5 May | "Du Liebst Mich Nicht" | Sabrina Setlur | | Klappe die 2te | Tic Tac Toe | |
| 12 May | "Lonely" | Nana | | Klappe die 2te | Tic Tac Toe | |
| 19 May | "Lonely" | Nana | | Klappe die 2te | Tic Tac Toe | |
| 26 May | "Lonely" | Nana | | Klappe die 2te | Tic Tac Toe | |
| 2 June | "Lonely" | Nana | | Klappe die 2te | Tic Tac Toe | |
| 9 June | "Lonely" | Nana | | 'N Sync | NSYNC | |
| 16 June | "Sonic Empire" | Members of Mayday | | Klappe die 2te | Tic Tac Toe | |
| 23 June | "MMMBop" | Hanson | | Klappe die 2te | Tic Tac Toe | |
| 30 June | "I'll Be Missing You" | Puff Daddy featuring Faith Evans and 112 | | Destination Anywhere | Jon Bon Jovi | |
| 7 July | "I'll Be Missing You" | Puff Daddy featuring Faith Evans and 112 | | Middle of Nowhere | Hanson | |
| 14 July | "I'll Be Missing You" | Puff Daddy featuring Faith Evans and 112 | | The Fat of the Land | The Prodigy | |
| 21 July | "I'll Be Missing You" | Puff Daddy featuring Faith Evans and 112 | | The Fat of the Land | The Prodigy | |
| 28 July | "I'll Be Missing You" | Puff Daddy featuring Faith Evans and 112 | | The Fat of the Land | The Prodigy | |
| 4 August | "I'll Be Missing You" | Puff Daddy featuring Faith Evans and 112 | | Bandits | Soundtrack | |
| 11 August | "I'll Be Missing You" | Puff Daddy featuring Faith Evans and 112 | | Bandits | Soundtrack | |
| 18 August | "I'll Be Missing You" | Puff Daddy featuring Faith Evans and 112 | | Bandits | Soundtrack | |
| 25 August | "I'll Be Missing You" | Puff Daddy featuring Faith Evans and 112 | | Backstreet's Back | Backstreet Boys | |
| 1 September | "I'll Be Missing You" | Puff Daddy featuring Faith Evans and 112 | | Backstreet's Back | Backstreet Boys | |
| 8 September | "I'll Be Missing You" | Puff Daddy featuring Faith Evans and 112 | | Sehnsucht | Rammstein | |
| 15 September | "Men in Black" | Will Smith | | Sehnsucht | Rammstein | |
| 22 September | "Candle in the Wind 1997" | Elton John | | Sehnsucht | Rammstein | |
| 29 September | "Candle in the Wind 1997" | Elton John | | Sehnsucht | Rammstein | |
| 6 October | "Candle in the Wind 1997" | Elton John | | Sehnsucht | Rammstein | |
| 13 October | "Candle in the Wind 1997" | Elton John | | Bridges to Babylon | The Rolling Stones | |
| 20 October | "Candle in the Wind 1997" | Elton John | | Bridges to Babylon | The Rolling Stones | |
| 27 October | "Candle in the Wind 1997" | Elton John | | Bridges to Babylon | The Rolling Stones | |
| 3 November | "Candle in the Wind 1997" | Elton John | | Bridges to Babylon | The Rolling Stones | |
| 10 November | "Barbie Girl" | Aqua | | Eros | Eros Ramazzotti | |
| 17 November | "Barbie Girl" | Aqua | | Growin' Up | The Kelly Family | |
| 24 November | "Barbie Girl" | Aqua | | Eros | Eros Ramazzotti | |
| 1 December | "Barbie Girl" | Aqua | | Reload | Metallica | |
| 8 December | "Barbie Girl" | Aqua | | Reload | Metallica | |
| 15 December | "Barbie Girl" | Aqua | | Eros | Eros Ramazzotti | |
| 22 December | "It's Like That" | Run-D.M.C. vs. Jason Nevins | | Let's Talk About Love | Celine Dion | |
| 29 December | No release (Note: Same issue as for 22 December.) | | | | | |

== See also ==
- List of number-one hits (Germany)
