= List of Dutch Top 40 number-one singles of 1997 =

These hits topped the Dutch Top 40 in 1997 (see 1997 in music).

Issue date	Artist	Song
4 January	No Doubt	Don't Speak
11 January	No Doubt	Don't Speak
18 January	No Doubt	Don't Speak
25 January	No Doubt	Don't Speak
1 February	No Doubt	Don't Speak
8 February	No Doubt	Don't Speak
15 February	No Mercy	When I Die
22 February	No Mercy	When I Die
1 March	No Mercy	When I Die
8 March	No Mercy	When I Die
15 March	R. Kelly	I Believe I Can Fly
22 March	Frans Bauer & Marianne Weber	De regenboog
29 March	Frans Bauer & Marianne Weber	De regenboog
5 April	Frans Bauer & Marianne Weber	De regenboog
12 April	Jantje Smit	Ik zing dit lied voor jou alleen
19 April	Jantje Smit	Ik zing dit lied voor jou alleen
26 April	Jantje Smit	Ik zing dit lied voor jou alleen
3 May	Jantje Smit	Ik zing dit lied voor jou alleen
10 May	Jantje Smit	Ik zing dit lied voor jou alleen
17 May	Jantje Smit	Ik zing dit lied voor jou alleen
24 May	Jantje Smit	Ik zing dit lied voor jou alleen
31 May	Hero	Toen ik je zag
7 June	Hero	Toen ik je zag
14 June	Hero	Toen ik je zag
21 June	Hero	Toen ik je zag
28 June	Hero	Toen ik je zag
5 July	Puff Daddy & Faith Evans feat. 112	I'll Be Missing You
12 July	Puff Daddy & Faith Evans feat. 112	I'll Be Missing You
19 July	Puff Daddy & Faith Evans feat. 112	I'll Be Missing You
26 July	Puff Daddy & Faith Evans feat. 112	I'll Be Missing You
2 August	Puff Daddy & Faith Evans feat. 112	I'll Be Missing You
9 August	Puff Daddy & Faith Evans feat. 112	I'll Be Missing You
16 August	Puff Daddy & Faith Evans feat. 112	I'll Be Missing You
23 August	Puff Daddy & Faith Evans feat. 112	I'll Be Missing You
30 August	Puff Daddy & Faith Evans feat. 112	I'll Be Missing You
6 September	Freek de Jonge & Stips	Leven na de dood
13 September	Freek de Jonge & Stips	Leven na de dood
20 September	Aqua	Barbie Girl
27 September	Elton John	Candle in the Wind 1997 / Something About the Way You Look Tonight
4 October	Elton John	Candle in the Wind 1997 / Something About the Way You Look Tonight
11 October	Elton John	Candle in the Wind 1997 / Something About the Way You Look Tonight
18 October	Elton John	Candle in the Wind 1997 / Something About the Way You Look Tonight
25 October	Elton John	Candle in the Wind 1997 / Something About the Way You Look Tonight
1 November	Wes	Alane
8 November	Wes	Alane
15 November	Wes	Alane
22 November	Wes	Alane
29 November	Wes	Alane
6 December	Wes	Alane
13 December	Wes	Alane
20 December	Wes	Alane

== See also ==
- 1997 in music
