= Peter Bischof =

Peter Bischof may refer to:

- Frank-Peter Bischof (born 1954), German canoe racer
- Peter Bischof (songwriter), songwriter, composer of "Where Do You Go" & "Please Don't Go"
