= Comeback (Tic Tac Toe album) =

Studio album by Tic Tac Toe
- Released: 17 February 2006
- Genre: Pop-rap
- Language: German, English
- Label: A One Entertainment, Warner Music Group

Tic Tac Toe chronology
Ist der Ruf erst ruiniert... (2000)	Comeback (2006)

Professional ratings
Review scores
Source	Rating
CDstarts.de	5/10 stars

Comeback is the fourth and final studio album by German all-female pop-rap band Tic Tac Toe, released in 2006 by A One Entertainment. The album was their first in nearly a decade recorded in the original line-up, after Ricarda "Ricky" Wältken had re-joined the band.

The album was preceded by the single "Spiegel" in 2005 which became a top 10 hit in German-speaking countries. However, the second and final single, "Keine Ahnung", was a commercial failure and did not enter any charts. The album itself was a moderate top 40 chart success.

== Track listing ==
No.	Title	Title translation	Length
1.	"Abgrund"	Abyss	4:42
2.	"Wenn der Vorhang fällt"	When the Curtain Falls	4:30
3.	"Tic Tac Toe"		4:00
4.	"Das ist Lee"	This Is Lee	3:33
5.	"Lass los"	Let Go	5:09
6.	"Brief"	Letter	5:26
7.	"One Night Stand" (feat. Metaphysics)		3:55
8.	"After Show"		4:17
9.	"Tanzkillah"	Dancekillah	3:50
10.	"Hit the Road Jack"		2:39
11.	"Freunde fürs Leben"	Friends for Life	3:44
12.	"Spiegel"	Mirror	5:09
13.	"Keine Ahnung"	No Idea	4:03

== Charts ==
Chart (2006)	Peak position
Austria (Ö3 Austria Top 40)	26
Europe (European Top 100 Albums)	73
Germany (Media Control)	25
Switzerland (Swiss Hitparade)	43
