= Spiegel (song) =

Single by Tic Tac Toe

from the album Comeback
- Released: 19 December 2005
- Genre: Pop-rap
- Length: 5:08
- Label: A One Entertainment

Tic Tac Toe singles chronology
"Morgen ist heute schon gestern" (2000)	"Spiegel" (2005)	"Keine Ahnung" (2006)

"Spiegel" (English: "Mirror") is a 2005 song by German pop-rap girl group Tic Tac Toe. It was released as their comeback single in December 2005, after a five-year hiatus. The song was met with commercial success and was a top 10 hit in Germany, Austria and Switzerland. It later appeared on their fourth and final album Comeback.

The song's lyrics are indicative about personal problems of three fictional individuals at a group psychotherapy, with each Tic Tac Toe member representing a different character. Jazzy takes the role of a teenage girl called Kerstin who has low self-esteem due to her overweight, Ricky is a young woman Michelle whose modelling career is taking its toll on her life, and Lee represents Bernard, a man caught up in a rat race, whose job has a negative impact on his family. In the song's climax, Bernard pulls out a gun and in a rage commits suicide.

== Track listing ==
- CD Single
1. "Spiegel" – 5:08
2. "Spiegel" (Radio Edit) – 4:54
3. "Spiegel" (Radio Short Edit) – 4:18
4. "Spiegel" (Oacland Remix) – 4:47
5. "Spiegel" (Aquarian Remix) – 4:48

== Charts ==
=== Weekly charts ===
Chart (2005–06)	Peak position
Austria (Ö3 Austria Top 40)	7
Europe (European Hot 100 Singles)	30
Germany (GfK Entertainment)	7
Switzerland (Swiss Hitparade)	10

=== Year-end charts ===
Chart (2006)	Position
Austria (Ö3 Austria Top 40)	59
Germany (Official German Charts)	51
Switzerland (Schweizer Hitparade)	89
