= My Promise =

Studio album by No Mercy
- Released: 21 October 1996
- Recorded: 1995–1996
- Genres: Eurodance; dance-pop
- Length: 55:18
- Labels: MCI; BMG; Arista
- Producer: Frank Farian

No Mercy chronology
My Promise (1996)	More (1998)

Alternative cover
- No Mercy cover

Singles from My Promise
- 1. "Missing" Released: September 1995; 2. "Where Do You Go" Released: 13 May 1996; 3. "When I Die" Released: 18 November 1996; 4. "Please Don't Go" Released: 21 January 1997; 5. "Kiss You All Over" Released: 25 August 1997

Professional ratings
Review scores
Source	Rating
AllMusic	4/5 stars
Billboard	(favorable)
Music Week	3/5 stars

My Promise (released as No Mercy in North America) is the debut studio album by German pop band No Mercy. It was released on 21 October 1996 through MCI Records, BMG, and Arista Records. It is the band's most successful album and contains all of their international hits: "Missing", "Where Do You Go", "When I Die", "Please Don't Go" and "Kiss You All Over".

== Critical reception ==
Paul Verna from Billboard viewed the album as "an engaging set", noting that producer Frank Farian "keeps the set relentlessly bright and rife with fluttering flamenco guitars—save for the brooding ballad "When I Die", which allows singer Marty Cintron to fully flex his boyish, star-powered charm." He added, "Knee-deep with potential hits, the album's next logical single should be either the giddy rendition of Exile's "Kiss You All Over" or the spirited "Don't Make Me Live Without You"." British magazine Music Week wrote, "Lively Latin numbers and luscious love songs, most underpinned by flamenco guitar, are assembled for a pleasing debut."

== Track listing ==
My Promise track listing
No.	Title	Lyrics	Music	Length
1.	"Where Do You Go"	Frank Farian, Peter Bischof-Fallenstein	Farian	4:32
2.	"Kiss You All Over"	Mike Chapman, Nicky Chinn	Chapman, Chinn	4:35
3.	"Don't Make Me Live Without You"	Diane Warren	Warren	4:02
4.	"When I Die"	Bischof-Fallenstein, Warren	Farian, Dietmar Kawohl	4:30
5.	"Please Don't Go"	Farian, Bischof-Fallenstein, Marty Cintron	Farian	4:01
6.	"Bonita"	Farian, Cintron, Bischof-Fallenstein, Ariel Hernandez, Gabriel Hernandez, Max Montana	Farian	3:47
7.	"My Promise to You"	Dino Esposito, Rebecca Byram	Esposito, Byram	4:00
8.	"D' Yer Mak R"	John Bonham, Robert Plant, John Paul Jones	Bonham, Plant, Jones	3:53
9.	"Missing"	Tracey Thorn	Ben Watt	3:59
10.	"This Masquerade"	Leon Russell	Russell	3:16
11.	"In and Out"	Gerry Stober, Stevie Bensusen, Shaun LaBelle	Stober, Bensusen, LaBelle	3:24
12.	"Who Do You Love"	Farian, John Davis	Farian, Davis	3:21
13.	"How Much I Love You"	Stober, Bensusen, LaBelle	Stober, Bensusen, LaBelle	4:02
14.	"Part of Me"	Cintron, Billy Steinberg, Tony Lombardo	Cintron	3:54
15.	"Where Do You Go" (Trip House mix) (bonus track)	Farian, Bischof-Fallenstein	Farian	4:28

North American track listing (No Mercy)
No.	Title	Length
1.	"Where Do You Go"	4:28
2.	"Don't Make Me Live Without You"	3:56
3.	"When I Die"	4:45
4.	"Kiss You All Over"	4:28
5.	"Part of Me"	3:50
6.	"Bonita"	3:48
7.	"Please Don't Go"	4:00
8.	"My Promise to You"	3:55
9.	"Message of Love"	2:34
10.	"Do You Want Me"	4:12
11.	"How Much I Love You"	4:00
12.	"Where Do You Go" (Ocean Drive Mix)	7:27
13.	"Don't Make Me Live Without You" (Mainstream Mix)	3:55

== Charts ==
=== Weekly charts ===
Chart (1996–97)	Peak position
Australian Albums (ARIA)	4
Austrian Albums (Ö3 Austria)	1
Belgian Albums (Ultratop Flanders)	4
Canadian Albums (RPM)	22
Dutch Albums (Album Top 100)	3
German Albums (GfK Entertainment)	6
Hungarian Albums (MAHASZ)	24
New Zealand Albums (RMNZ)	38
Scottish Albums (Official Charts)	47
Swiss Albums (Schweizer Hitparade)	5
UK Albums (Official Charts)	17
US Albums (Billboard 200)	104
Zimbabwean Albums (ZIMA)	8

=== Year-end charts ===
Chart (1997)	Position
Australian Albums (ARIA)	24
Austrian Albums (Ö3 Austria)	1
Belgian Albums (Ultratop Flanders)	31
Dutch Albums (Album Top 100)	7
German Albums (GfK Entertainment)	12
Swiss Albums (Schweizer Hitparade)	3

== Certifications ==
Region	Certification	Certified units/sales
Australia (ARIA)	2× Platinum	140,000^{^}
Austria (IFPI Austria)	2× Platinum	100,000^{*}
Belgium (BRMA)	Gold	25,000^{*}
Canada (Music Canada)	Platinum	100,000^{^}
Germany (BVMI)	Platinum	500,000^{^}
Netherlands (NVPI)	Gold	50,000^{^}
Switzerland (IFPI Switzerland)	2× Platinum	100,000^{^}
United States (RIAA)	Gold	500,000^{^}
^{*} Sales figures based on certification alone.^{^} Shipments figures based on certification alone.
