= Klappe die 2te =

Studio album by Tic Tac Toe
- Released: 21 April 1997
- Genre: Pop-rap
- Length: 41:41
- Languages: German, English
- Labels: RCA, BMG
- Producer: Torsten Börger

Tic Tac Toe chronology
Tic Tac Toe (1996)	Klappe die 2te (1997)	Ist der Ruf erst ruiniert... (2000)

Professional ratings
Review scores
Source	Rating
AllMusic	2.5/5 stars

Klappe die 2te is the second studio album by German all-female pop-rap band Tic Tac Toe, released in 1997 by RCA Records. The lyrics and music were written by the band's manager Claudia Wohlfromm, her then-husband Torsten Börger, who also produced the album, and the band itself. The title translates Take Two.

The album spawned four singles, including the number-one "Warum?", arguably the band's biggest hit, and the international top 10 single "Mr. Wichtig". Klappe die 2te topped the charts in Germany and Switzerland, where it was certified double platinum, and has reportedly sold over 1.1 million copies in Germany alone as of 1998.

== Track listing ==
Original release
No.	Title	Title translation	Length
1.	"Ich wär' so gern so blöd wie du"	I'd Love to Be as Stupid as You	3:49
2.	"Mr. Wichtig"	Mr. Important	3:41
3.	"Das geht mir auf'n Sack (auch wenn ich keinen hab')"	It Gets on My Nerves (Although I Have None)	3:22
4.	"Warum?"	Why?	3:22
5.	"Große Jungs weinen nicht"	Big Boys Don't Cry	4:13
6.	"Ich fühl' mich A.U."	I'm Feeling A.U.	3:07
7.	"Furz"	Fart	3:33
8.	"Beruf Sohn"	Son the Professional	3:24
9.	"Schubidamdam"		3:51
10.	"Bitte küss' mich nicht"	Please Don't Kiss Me	3:36
11.	"Warum?" (Score I)		4:00
12.	"I Think You're Sch..."		3:23

Bonus tracks on re-release
No.	Title	Title translation	Length
13.	"Verpiss' dich" (Ich vermiss' dich - Mix)	Fuck You (I Miss You - Mix)	4:44
14.	"Warum?" (Out of Space Mix)		3:44
15.	"Mr. Wichtig" (Ocean Drive Radio Mix)		3:48
16.	"Bitte küss' mich nicht" (Guilty Mix)		5:19

== Charts ==
=== Weekly charts ===
Chart (1997)	Peak position
Austria (Ö3 Austria Top 40)	3
Europe (European Top 100 Albums)	5
Germany (Media Control)	1
Hungary (Mahasz)	27
Netherlands (Album Top 100)	43
Switzerland (Swiss Hitparade)	1

=== Year-end charts ===
Chart (1997)	Placement
Austria	3
Europe	24
Germany	2
Switzerland	7

== Certifications ==
Sales certifications for Klappe die 2te
Region	Certification	Certified units/sales
Austria (IFPI Austria)	Platinum	50,000^{*}
Germany (BVMI)	2× Platinum	1,000,000^{^}
Poland (ZPAV)	Gold	50,000^{*}
Switzerland (IFPI Switzerland)	2× Platinum	100,000^{^}
Summaries
Europe (IFPI)	Platinum	1,000,000^{*}
^{*} Sales figures based on certification alone.^{^} Shipments figures based on certification alone.
