= Tic Tac Toe (album) =

Studio album by Tic Tac Toe
- Released: 15 April 1996
- Recorded: 1995–1996
- Genre: Pop-rap
- Length: 46:27
- Language: German
- Labels: RCA, BMG
- Producer: Torsten Börger

Tic Tac Toe chronology
Tic Tac Toe (1996)	Klappe die 2te (1997)

Professional ratings
Review scores
Source	Rating
AllMusic	4/5 stars

Tic Tac Toe is the debut studio album by German all-female pop-rap group Tic Tac Toe, released in 1996 by RCA Records. The lyrics and music were written by the group's manager Claudia Wohlfromm, her then-husband Torsten Börger, who also produced the album, and the group itself.

The album featured the group's popular debut single "Ich find' dich scheiße" which reached the top 5 in Germany and Austria, as well as their first number-one hit "Verpiss' dich". The album reached the top 5 in Germany, Austria and Switzerland, where it earned platinum and multi-platinum certifications.

== Track listing ==
No.	Title	Title translation	Length
1.	"Ugu Ugu Intro"		0:52
2.	"Haste was, biste was"	You've Got Something, Then You're Something	4:15
3.	"Ich find' dich scheisse"	I Think You're Shit	3:34
4.	"Verpiss' dich"	Piss Off	4:06
5.	"Funky"		3:47
6.	"n' Mann"	A Man	3:54
7.	"Leck mich am A, B, Zeh"	Lick My A, B, Toe	3:34
8.	"U-Bahn"	Underground	4:31
9.	"Du hast den Schönsten"	You've Got the Nicest	3:55
10.	"Ruhrpottniggaz"	Niggaz from the Ruhr	3:59
11.	"Funky" (Funk-Mix)		5:42
12.	"Ugu Ugu (Wer hat Angst?)"	Ugu Ugu (Who's Scared?)	4:17
Total length:			46:27

== Charts ==
=== Weekly charts ===
Chart (1996–97)	Peak position
Austria (Ö3 Austria Top 40)	3
Europe (European Top 100 Albums)	15
Germany (Media Control)	3
Switzerland (Swiss Hitparade)	4

=== Year-end charts ===
Chart (1996)	Placement
Europe	88
Germany	26
Switzerland	7

Chart (1997)	Placement
Austria	14
Europe	31
Germany	8
Switzerland	8

== Certifications ==
Region	Certification	Certified units/sales
Austria (IFPI Austria)	Platinum	50,000^{*}
Germany (BVMI)	2× Platinum	1,000,000^{^}
Switzerland (IFPI Switzerland)	2× Platinum	100,000^{^}
Summaries
Europe (IFPI)	Platinum	1,000,000^{*}
^{*} Sales figures based on certification alone.^{^} Shipments figures based on certification alone.
