= I'll Be Missing You =

1997 single by Puff Daddy and Faith Evans featuring 112

Single by Puff Daddy and Faith Evans featuring 112

from the album No Way Out
- B-side: "We'll Always Love Big Poppa"; "Cry On"
- Released: May 27, 1997
- Recorded: 1997
- Length: 5:43 (LP explicit); 5:01 (LP clean); 4:08 (radio edit); 3:29 (short version)
- Label: Bad Boy; Arista
- Songwriters: Sting; Todd Gaither; Faith Evans
- Producer: Stevie J

Puff Daddy singles chronology
"Can't Nobody Hold Me Down" (1997)	"I'll Be Missing You" (1997)	"Someone" (1997)

Faith Evans singles chronology
"Stressed Out" (1996)	"I'll Be Missing You" (1997)	"How's It Goin' Down" (1998)

112 singles chronology
"Cupid" (1997)	"I'll Be Missing You" (1997)	"All Cried Out" (1997)

Music video
- "I'll Be Missing You" on YouTube

"I'll Be Missing You" is a tribute song by American rapper Puff Daddy and American singer Faith Evans, featuring American R&B group 112. The song honors the Notorious B.I.G., a fellow artist on Puff Daddy's Bad Boy Records and Evans's husband, who was murdered on March 9, 1997. It was released in May 1997 by Bad Boy and Arista Records as the second single from Puff Daddy's debut studio album, No Way Out (1997).

The track incorporates a prominent sample from the Police's 1983 song "Every Breath You Take", with an adapted chorus performed by Evans. It also includes elements from the 1929 hymn "I'll Fly Away" by Albert E. Brumley and features a spoken introduction layered over a choral arrangement of Samuel Barber’s "Adagio for Strings". The song’s music video was directed by Hype Williams and filmed at various locations in Chicago.

At the 40th Annual Grammy Awards, "I'll Be Missing You" won the Grammy Award for Best Rap Performance by a Duo or Group. The single spent eleven consecutive weeks at number one on the US Billboard Hot 100 and reached the top position in 15 other countries. It was the best-performing single of 1997 in Iceland, the Netherlands (Dutch Top 40), and Romania. With shipments of over three million copies in the United States and more than one million copies in both Germany and the United Kingdom, the song is regarded as one of the best-selling singles of all time.

== Composition ==
"I'll Be Missing You" is based on a slightly slowed down sample of the 1983 single "Every Breath You Take" by the Police. It also uses an interpolation of the "Every Breath You Take" melody, sung by Biggie's widow, Faith Evans. Combs did not secure legal approval for the sample before releasing the song, and Police songwriter Sting sued, receiving 100% of the song royalties (with some reports estimating $2,000 per day). Police guitarist Andy Summers called the sample "a major rip-off", and told the A.V. Club: "I found out about it after it was on the radio ... I’d be walking round Tower Records, and the fucking thing would be playing over and over. It was very bizarre while it lasted." Sting later reconciled with Bad Boy, and performed the song alongside Puff Daddy and Evans in September 1997 at the MTV Video Music Awards.

The track uses the melody from the 1929 hymn, "I'll Fly Away". Combs' verses were written by rapper Sauce Money. Combs had originally asked Jay-Z to write the track, but he turned it down and suggested that Sauce Money write the song instead.

== Critical reception ==
Tom Sinclair from Entertainment Weekly panned the song, giving it a grade of D and describing it as a "maudlin 'tribute' to the Notorious B.I.G., [in which] the late rapper's former mentor (Puff Daddy) and wife (Faith Evans) team up to say their farewells to the big man on a song that 'samples' The Police's 'Every Breath You Take'. With lyrics like 'Know you're in heaven, smiling down/Watching us while we pray for you', 'I'll Be Missing You' gives the lie to those who claim hip-hoppers are above self-serving sentimentality." British magazine Music Week gave it four out of five and named it a "dignified tribute". Also James Hyman from Record Mirror gave the song four out of five, noting that "once again, blatant plundering from an Eighties groove forms the basis for an instant pop-rap crossover."

David Fricke from Rolling Stone wrote, "In 'I'll Be Missing You', he didn't merely crib from Sting; he took a song about stalking and transformed it into a radiant hymn of brotherly love and a community's loss." Freelance music writer Jeremy Simmonds described it as "somewhat turgid". Ian Hyland from Sunday Mirror gave it nine out of ten, commenting, "Not the greatest rap I've ever heard but this tribute to murdered rapper Notorious B.I.G. is going to be H.U.G.E. In a mish-mash of The Police's 'Every Breath You Take' and John Waite's 'Missing', the highlight is Faith Evans' amazing voice." In March 2024, Forbes magazine ranked "I'll Be Missing You" number 43 in their list of "The 50 Best Songs of the 1990s". Hugh McIntyre named it "a poignant reflection on loss and longing."

== Chart performance ==
"I'll Be Missing You" topped many charts across the world. It reached number one in the United States, the United Kingdom, Australia, Austria, Denmark, Flanders, Germany, Iceland, Ireland, Lithuania, the Netherlands, New Zealand, Norway, Poland, Romania, Spain, Sweden and Switzerland.

The song debuted at number one on the US Billboard Hot 100, and was the only rap song by a male artist to do so until Eminem's "Not Afraid" debuted at the top spot, 13 years later, in 2010. The song spent a record-breaking 11 weeks at number one on the Hot 100, making it the longest-running number-one rap song in history, until Eminem's "Lose Yourself" spent 12 weeks at number-one in 2002.

The song re-entered the UK Singles Chart at number 32 on July 8, 2007, 10 years after it had its full physical release, and 10 years after it was number one. As of July 2013, "I'll Be Missing You" is the 22nd best-selling song of all time in the UK.

== Music video ==
The accompanying music video for "I'll Be Missing You" was directed by American director Hype Williams and shot in Chicago. Portions of the video were filmed in the Helmut Jahn designed moving walkway tunnel that connects Concourses B and C in Terminal 1 at the O'Hare International Airport. The hill and motorcycle scene was shot at Sauer Family Prairie Kame Preserve in Elburn, Illinois. The music video was added to BET and MTV on the week ending on May 11, 1997.

== Formats and track listings ==
- CD single
1. Puff Daddy featuring Faith Evans and 112 – "I'll Be Missing You"
- Maxi-single
1. Puff Daddy featuring Faith Evans and 112 – "I'll Be Missing You"
2. The Lox – "We'll Always Love Big Poppa"
3. 112 – "Cry On"
4. Puff Daddy and Faith Evans featuring 112 – "I'll Be Missing You" (Instrumental)
5. The Lox – "We'll Always Love Big Poppa" (Instrumental)

== Charts ==
=== Weekly charts ===
1997 weekly chart performance for "I'll Be Missing You"
Chart (1997)	Peak position
Australia (ARIA)	1
Austria (Ö3 Austria Top 40)	1
Belgium (Ultratop 50 Flanders)	1
Belgium (Ultratop 50 Wallonia)	3
Canada (Nielsen SoundScan)	1
Canada Top Singles (RPM)	4
Canada Adult Contemporary (RPM)	27
Canada Dance/Urban (RPM)	1
Denmark (IFPI Danmark)	1
Estonia (Eesti Top 20)	1
Europe (Eurochart Hot 100)	1
Finland (Suomen virallinen lista)	3
France (SNEP)	2
Germany (GfK)	1
Hungary (Mahasz)	5
Iceland (Íslenski Listinn Topp 40)	1
Ireland (IRMA)	1
Israel (Israeli Singles Chart)	1
Italy (Musica e dischi)	2
Italy Airplay (Music & Media)	1
Lithuania (M-1)	1
Netherlands (Dutch Top 40)	1
Netherlands (Single Top 100)	1
New Zealand (Recorded Music NZ)	1
Norway (VG-lista)	1
Poland Airplay (Music & Media)	2
Romania (Romanian Top 100)	1
Scottish Singles Sales (Official Charts)	1
Spain (AFYVE)	1
Sweden (Sverigetopplistan)	1
Switzerland (Schweizer Hitparade)	1
UK Singles (Official Charts)	1
UK Dance (Official Charts)	2
UK Hip Hop/R&B (Official Charts)	1
US Billboard Hot 100	1
US Dance Singles Sales (Billboard)	1
US Hot R&B/Hip-Hop Songs (Billboard)	1
US Hot Rap Songs (Billboard)	1
US Pop Airplay (Billboard)	11
US Rhythmic Airplay (Billboard)	1

2009 weekly chart performance for "I'll Be Missing You"
Chart (2009)	Peak position
UK Hip Hop/R&B (Official Charts)	22

2013 weekly chart performance for "I'll Be Missing You"
Chart (2013)	Peak position
South Korea International (Circle)	73

2022 weekly chart performance for "I'll Be Missing You"
Chart (2022)	Peak position
Poland Airplay (ZPAV)	82

2025 weekly chart performance for "I'll Be Missing You"
Chart (2025)	Peak position
Romania Airplay (TopHit)	76

=== Monthly charts ===
2025 monthyl chart performance for "I'll Be Missing You"
Chart (2025)	Peak position
Romania Airplay (TopHit)	83

=== Year-end charts ===
Year-end chart performance for "I'll Be Missing You"
Chart (1997)	Position
Australia (ARIA)	4
Austria (Ö3 Austria Top 40)	2
Belgium (Ultratop 50 Flanders)	4
Belgium (Ultratop 50 Wallonia)	13
Canada Top Singles (RPM)	36
Canada Dance/Urban (RPM)	7
Europe (Eurochart Hot 100)	2
France (SNEP)	8
Germany (Media Control)	2
Iceland (Íslenski Listinn Topp 40)	1
Israel (Israeli Singles Chart)	3
Netherlands (Dutch Top 40)	1
Netherlands (Single Top 100)	2
New Zealand (RIANZ)	2
Norway (VG-lista)	2
Romania (Romanian Top 100)	1
Sweden (Topplistan)	2
Switzerland (Schweizer Hitparade)	2
UK Singles (OCC)	3
US Billboard Hot 100	3
US Hot R&B Singles (Billboard)	2
US Hot Rap Singles (Billboard)	1
US Maxi-Singles Singles (Billboard)	1
US Rhythmic Top 40 (Billboard)	4
US Top 40/Mainstream (Billboard)	32

=== Decade-end charts ===
Decade-end chart performance for "I'll Be Missing You"
Chart (1990–1999)	Position
Austria (Ö3 Austria Top 40)	28
Belgium (Ultratop 50 Flanders)	15
Canada (Nielsen SoundScan)	4
Netherlands (Dutch Top 40)	18
US Billboard Hot 100	10

=== All-time chart ===
All-time chart performance for "I'll Be Missing You"
Chart (1958–2018)	Position
US Billboard Hot 100	105

== Certifications and sales ==
Certifications and sales for "I'll Be Missing You"
Region	Certification	Certified units/sales
Australia (ARIA)	2× Platinum	140,000^{^}
Austria (IFPI Austria)	2× Platinum	100,000^{*}
Belgium (BRMA)	4× Platinum	200,000^{*}
Canada (Music Canada)	Platinum	100,000^{^}
Denmark (IFPI Danmark)	Gold	45,000^{‡}
France (SNEP)	Gold	250,000^{*}
Germany (BVMI) Arista USA	3× Platinum	1,500,000^{^}
Germany (BVMI) Bad Boy Records	3× Gold	750,000^{‡}
Italy (FIMI)	Platinum	100,000^{‡}
Netherlands (NVPI)	2× Platinum	150,000^{^}
New Zealand (RMNZ)	4× Platinum	120,000^{‡}
Norway (IFPI Norway)	Platinum	
Spain (Promusicae)	Gold	30,000^{‡}
Sweden (GLF)	3× Platinum	90,000^{^}
Switzerland (IFPI Switzerland)	2× Platinum	100,000^{^}
United Kingdom (BPI)	4× Platinum	2,400,000^{‡}
United States (RIAA)	3× Platinum	3,100,000
^{*} Sales figures based on certification alone.^{^} Shipments figures based on certification alone.^{‡} Sales+streaming figures based on certification alone.

== Release history ==
Release dates and formats for "I'll Be Missing You"
Region	Date	Format(s)	Label(s)	Ref(s).
United States	May 20, 1997	Rhythmic contemporary radio	Bad Boy Entertainment; Arista	
United States	May 27, 1997	CD	Bad Boy Entertainment; Arista	
United Kingdom	June 16, 1997	12-inch vinyl; CD; cassette	Arista; Puff Daddy	
Japan	July 2, 1997	CD	Bad Boy Entertainment; Arista	

== See also ==
- List of best-selling singles
- List of best-selling singles in the United Kingdom
- List of Hot 100 number-one singles of 1997 (U.S.)
- List of European number-one hits of 1997
- List of number-one R&B singles of 1997 (U.S.)
- List of number-one singles of 1997 (Australia)
- List of number-one hits of 1997 (Austria)
- List of number-one singles of 1997 (Belgium-Flanders)
- List of number-one singles of 1997 (Germany)
- List of number-one singles of 1997 (Ireland)
- List of number-one singles of 1997 (Netherlands)
- List of number-one singles of 1997 (New Zealand)
- List of number-one singles of 1997 (Norway)
- List of number-one singles (Sweden)
- List of number-one singles of 1997 (Switzerland)
- List of UK Singles Chart number ones of 1997
