= More (No Mercy album) =

Studio album by No Mercy
- Released: October 1998
- Studio: AME Studios (Florida, U.S.)
- Length: 57:01
- Label: MCI; BMG
- Producer: Frank Farian

No Mercy chronology
My Promise (1996)	More (1998)	Greatest Hits (2007)

Singles from More
- 1. "Hello How Are You" Released: 1998; 2. "Tu Amor" Released: 1998; 3. "More Than a Feeling" Released: 1999

More is the second studio album by German pop band No Mercy. It was released in October 1998 through MCI Records and BMG.

== Track listing ==
No.	Title	Writer(s)	Length
1.	"More Than a Feeling"	Tom Scholz	4:30
2.	"Hello How Are You"	R. Dalton/G. Mart/P. Nelson/Franz Reuther	4:19
3.	"Baby Come Back"	J.C. Crowley/Peter Beckett	4:00
4.	"Baby I Was Made for Loving You"	Frank Farian/P. Nelson/Dietmar Kawohl/G. Mart/Peter Bischof-Fallenstein	4:32
5.	"Full Moon"	Stephen Cassini/John Seath-Smith	4:26
6.	"Let's Stay Together"	Farian/Bischof-Fallenstein	3:34
7.	"You Really Got Me"	Farian/Mart/Melanie Thornton/Marty Cintron/P.G. Wylder	4:10
8.	"Tu Amor"	Diane Warren	4:28
9.	"Conzuela Biaz"	Farian/Catharine Courage/Michael O'Hara	3:26
10.	"I Have Always Loved You"	Billy Steinberg/Rick Nowels/Marie-Claire D'Ubaldo	4:00
11.	"More, More, More"	Farian/Mart/Bischof-Fallenstein	3:20
12.	"I'm Not Alone"	Cintron/Wylder	3:27
13.	"Let Me Be the One"	Ariel Hernandez/Cintron/George Noriega	3:34
14.	"Hello How Are You" (unplugged) (bonus track)	Dalton/Mart/Nelson/ Reuther	3:15

== Charts ==
Chart performance for More
Chart (1998)	Peak position
Austrian Albums (Ö3 Austria)	9
German Albums (GfK Entertainment)	7
Hungarian Albums (MAHASZ)	40
Swiss Albums (Schweizer Hitparade)	9

== Certifications ==
Region	Certification	Certified units/sales
Austria (IFPI Austria)	Gold	25,000^{*}
^{*} Sales figures based on certification alone.
