= Please Don't Go (No Mercy song) =

1997 single by No Mercy

Single by No Mercy

from the album No Mercy/My Promise
- B-side: "Please Don't Go" (Spanish version)
- Released: 21 January 1997
- Genre: Dance-pop
- Length: 4:14
- Label: MCI; BMG
- Composer: Franz Reuther
- Lyricists: Peter Bischof-Fallenstein; Marty Cintron; Mary Applegate
- Producer: Frank Farian

No Mercy singles chronology
"When I Die" (1996)	"Please Don't Go" (1997)	"Kiss You All Over" (1997)

"Please Don't Go" is a song by Germany-based pop band No Mercy, released on 21 January 1997 by MCI and BMG as the fourth single from their debut album, My Promise (1997). It became a worldwide hit, entering the top 10 in Austria, the Netherlands, Spain, and the United Kingdom.

== Composition ==
The song is written by Peter Bischof, Marty Cintron, Mary Applegate, Frank Farian (under his given name Franz Reuther, and P.G. Wilder.

== Critical reception ==
Alan Jones from Music Week commented, "The dance beat, the Balearic guitar work, the Gregorian backing vocals — it has to be No Mercy's 'Where Do You Go', but it's not. It's their identikit follow-up 'Please Don't Go', which includes all the elements of their long-running debut hit bolted onto a tune which doesn't quite measure up."

== Music video ==
The music video for "Please Don't Go" was directed by Hannes Rossacher and premiered in March 1997. It features the group in a recording studio recording the track. Rossacher also directed the video for "Where Do You Go".

== Track listings ==
- CD single
1. "Please Don't Go" – 4:00
2. "Do You Want Me" – 4:12
- European CD maxi
1. "Please Don't Go" (radio edit) – 4:14
2. "Please Don't Go" (Spanish version) – 4:14
3. "Please Don't Go" (Ocean Drive mix) – 5:44
4. "Please Don't Go" (Berman Bros club mix) – 5:15
5. "Please Don't Go" (Spike pop mix) – 5:02
6. "Please Don't Go" (Trip House mix) – 5:07
7. "Please Don't Go" (Spike club mix) – 5:16
8. "Please Don't Go" (Manumission mix) – 5:01
- 12-inch maxi
1. "Please Don't Go" (Berman Brothers club mix) – 6:56
2. "Please Don't Go" (Darrin Friedman Spike Anthem) – 9:29
3. "Please Don't Go" (Vission & Lorimer Voyage club mix) – 7:03
4. "Please Don't Go" (Spanish remix) – 4:15
5. "Please Don't Go" (Ocean Drive mix)

== Charts ==
=== Weekly charts ===
Chart (1997)	Peak position
Australia (ARIA)	35
Austria (Ö3 Austria Top 40)	5
Belgium (Ultratop 50 Flanders)	13
Canada Top Singles (RPM)	23
Canada Dance/Urban (RPM)	4
Estonia (Eesti Top 20)	1
Europe (Eurochart Hot 100)	10
Germany (GfK)	11
Iceland (Íslenski Listinn Topp 40)	24
Ireland (IRMA)	19
Israel (Israeli Singles Chart)	6
Netherlands (Dutch Top 40)	6
Netherlands (Single Top 100)	11
New Zealand (Recorded Music NZ)	46
Scottish Singles Sales (Official Charts)	5
Spain (AFYVE)	5
Spain Airplay (Top 40 Radio)	36
Switzerland (Schweizer Hitparade)	15
UK Singles (Official Charts)	4
UK Airplay (Music Week)	40
US Billboard Hot 100	21
US Dance Singles Sales (Billboard)	7
US Pop Airplay (Billboard)	19
US Rhythmic Airplay (Billboard)	37

=== Year-end charts ===
Chart (1997)	Position
Austria (Ö3 Austria Top 40)	29
Belgium (Ultratop 50 Flanders)	78
Brazil (Crowley)	35
Canada Dance/Urban (RPM)	43
Europe (Eurochart Hot 100)	93
Germany (Media Control)	57
Israel (Israeli Singles Chart)	58
Netherlands (Dutch Top 40)	98
Netherlands (Single Top 100)	72
UK Singles (OCC)	137
US Top 40/Mainstream (Billboard)	90

== Release history ==
Region	Date	Format(s)	Label(s)	Ref.
United States	14 January 1997	Contemporary hit radio	Arista	
United States	21 January 1997	CD	Arista	
Japan	2 May 1997	CD	MCI; BMG	
United Kingdom	12 May 1997	CD; cassette	MCI; BMG	
