= Ist der Ruf erst ruiniert... =

Studio album by Tic Tac Toe
- Released: 29 May 2000
- Genre: Pop-rap
- Length: 41:32
- Language: German
- Label: RCA, BMG
- Producer: Torsten Börger

Tic Tac Toe chronology
Klappe die 2te (1997)	Ist der Ruf erst ruiniert... (2000)	Comeback (2006)

Professional ratings
Review scores
Source	Rating
laut.de	2/5 stars

Ist der Ruf erst ruiniert... is the third studio album by German all-female pop-rap band Tic Tac Toe, released in 2000 by RCA Records. The title comes from a German proverb "Ist der Ruf erst ruiniert, lebt es sich ganz ungeniert" which means "Once the reputation is ruined, you can live completely free". The material was again composed and produced by Torsten Börger.

The album was released after the original member Ricarda "Ricky" Wältken left the band amid controversies and conflicts with other bandmates, being subsequently replaced by Sara Brahms. It spawned three singles, of which only one, "Isch liebe disch", achieved moderate chart success internationally. The album did not sell as well as its predecessors and one year after its release the band entered a hiatus.

== Track listing ==
No.	Title	Title translation	Length
1.	"Ist der Ruf erst ruiniert..."	Once the Reputation Is Ruined...	3:42
2.	"Sein"	To Be	3:50
3.	"Es tut mir leid"	I'm Sorry	3:43
4.	"Fick' dich selber"	Fuck Yourself	3:36
5.	"0190"		3:55
6.	"Halt mich fest"	Hold Me Tight	3:39
7.	"Morgen ist heute schon gestern"	Tomorrow Today Is Already Yesterday	4:28
8.	"Alles O.K."	Everything's O.K.	3:42
9.	"Lästern"	Gossiping	3:49
10.	"Bla bla"	Blah Blah	3:44
11.	"Isch liebe disch"	I Love You	3:24

== Charts ==
Chart (2000)	Peak position
Austria (Ö3 Austria Top 40)	50
Europe (European Top 100 Albums)	100
Germany (Media Control)	34
Switzerland (Swiss Hitparade)	92
