= No Mercy (pop band) =

German and American pop band

- Also known as: Marty Cintron
- Origin: Germany
- Genres: Pop, Eurodance, dance-pop
- Years active: 1995–present
- Labels: Hansa, Arista, Show No Mercy Entertainment
- Members: Marty Cintron; Ariel Hernández; Gabriel Hernández
- Website: No Mercy website

No Mercy is a German pop band of American singers who were originally brought together in Germany by producer Frank Farian. The group consists of Bronx-born Marty Cintron and twin brothers Ariel and Gabriel Hernández, who hailed from Miami.

== Career ==
=== 1995–1997: My Promise ===
In 1995 the band released their single "Missing" which was a cover version of Everything but the Girl's 1994 hit. No Mercy released their debut album My Promise on October 21, 1996. My Promise was the original title chosen by the band's German record company, Hansa, BMG. The album was released in the U.S. only a week later under the self title No Mercy on October 29, 1996. The album, however, was released in most areas of the world with its original title My Promise, including Australia where it received two times platinum sales accreditation. My Promise which became a top-5 album in countries like Austria, Belgium, the Netherlands and Switzerland, produced two internationally popular singles, including "Where Do You Go" and "When I Die", the first being a cover of La Bouche's "Where Do You Go" from 1995 and the latter a revival of The Real Milli Vanilli original song; The Real Milli Vanilli is also a spin off of Milli Vanilli. Both projects are brainchildren of Frank Farian. This was followed by the single "Please Don't Go", which entered the top 5 in Austria and the U.K. The band released a re-worked version of the band Exile's number one song from 1978, "Kiss You All Over", which was a moderate success on the charts but still managed to enter the top 20 in Austria, the Netherlands and the UK.

=== 1998–1999: More ===
No Mercy's second album, More, which was released in Germany in October 1998, included singles such as "Hello How Are You", "More than a Feeling" (originally recorded by Boston) and "Tu Amor" (originally by Jon B., and later covered also by RBD). Although More was not as successful as its predecessor, it still managed to achieve success in the GSA region (Germany, Switzerland, Austria), peaking at No.7, No.9, No.9 respectively.

=== 2000–present: Singles and current status ===
In 2002, a single, "Don't Let Me Be Misunderstood" featuring guitarist Al Di Meola, was released to gauge support for No Mercy's third album. The record producer decided instead to rework the songs for solo artist Daniel Lopes' debut album, Shine On, in 2003. The band would guest feature in that album, on the track "Summer Angel".

In October 2007, No Mercy released their third album, Day By Day, under a new Australian-based independent record label, Show No Mercy Entertainment Pty Ltd, and via iTunes.

On December 16, 2011 No Mercy released the single "Shed My Skin" featuring Stan Kolev via iTunes.

Guitarist and lead vocalist Marty Cintron performs in Europe under the No Mercy name.

In 2021, Frank Farian released a cover of the eighties song "Cherish" by Kool & the Gang. He made also a mix version of it with the song "Rivers of Babylon", on which No Mercy collaborated.

== Discography ==
=== Studio albums ===
Title	Album details	Peak chart positions								Certifications
Title	Album details	GER	AUS	AUT	BEL (FL)	NLD	NZ	SWI	UK	Certifications
My Promise	Released: 21 October 1996; Label: Hansa Records, (BMG); Formats: CD, cassette, LP	6	4	1	4	3	38	5	17	BVMI: Platinum; ARIA: 2× Platinum; IFPI AUT: 2× Platinum; IFPI SWI: 2× Platinum
More	Released: 12 October 1998; Label: Hansa (BMG); Formats: CD, cassette, LP	7	–	9	–	–	–	9	–	IFPI AUT: Gold
Day By Day	Release date: 10 October 2007; Label: Show No Mercy; Formats: CD	–	–	–	–	–	–	–	–	
"—" denotes releases that did not chart

=== North American releases ===
Title	Album details	Peak chart positions		Certifications
Title	Album details	CAN	US	Certifications
No Mercy	Release date: 29 October 1996; Label: Arista; Formats: CD, cassette, LP	22	104	MC: Platinum; RIAA: Gold

=== Compilation albums ===
Title	Album details
Greatest Hits	Released: 2 March 2007; Format: CD, digital download; Label: Farian (Sony Music)

=== Singles ===
Title	Year	Peak chart positions											Certifications	Album
Title	Year	GER	AUS	AUT	BEL (FL)	CAN	IRE	NLD	NZ	SWI	UK	US	Certifications	Album
"Missing"	1995	19	–	–	–	–	–	–	–	9	83	–		My Promise/ No Mercy
"Where Do You Go"	1996	3	2	5	32	43	1	7	27	4	2	5	BVMI: Platinum; ARIA: Platinum; BPI: Gold; RIAA: Gold	My Promise/ No Mercy
"When I Die"	1996	5	2	1	7	–	–	1	–	3	–	41	BVMI: Gold; ARIA: Platinum; IFPI AUT: Platinum	My Promise/ No Mercy
"Please Don't Go"	1997	11	35	5	13	23	19	6	46	15	4	21		My Promise/ No Mercy
"Kiss You All Over"	1997	40	47	13	43	–	–	18	44	33	16	80		My Promise/ No Mercy
"Hello How Are You"	1998	24	–	12	–	–	–	–	–	14	–	–		More
"Tu Amor"	1998	–	–	–	–	–	–	–	–	–	–	–		More
"More Than a Feeling"	1999	94	–	–	–	–	–	–	–	–	–	–		More
"Morena"	2000	–	–	–	–	–	–	–	–	68	–	–		Non-album singles
"Where Is the Love"	2000	–	–	–	–	–	–	–	–	–	–	–		Non-album singles
"Don't Let Me Be Misunderstood" (featuring Al Di Meola)	2002	65	–	–	–	–	–	–	–	–	–	–		Non-album singles
"Shed My Skin" (featuring Stan Kolev)	2011	–	–	–	–	–	–	–	–	–	–	–		Non-album singles
"Day by Day 2015"	2015	–	–	–	–	–	–	–	–	–	–	–		Non-album singles
"—" denotes releases that did not chart

== See also ==
- List of number-one dance hits (United States)
- List of artists who reached number one on the US Dance chart
