= When I Die (The Real Milli Vanilli song) =

1991 song by the Real Milli Vanilli

Song by the Real Milli Vanilli

from the album The Moment of Truth
- Length: 4:00
- Label: Hansa
- Songwriters: Frank Farian; Dietmar Kawohl; Peter Bischof-Fallenstein; Diane Warren
- Producer: Frank Farian

"When I Die" is a song originally released by the Real Milli Vanilli on their 1991 album The Moment of Truth, and later by Try 'N' B on their 1992 debut album. The song achieved more exposure when Germany-based American Eurodance group No Mercy covered it for their 1996 debut album, My Promise. Both acts were managed by Frank Farian.

== No Mercy version ==
"When I Die"

Single by No Mercy

from the album No Mercy and My Promise
- B-side: "For Eternity"
- Released: 18 November 1996
- Genre: Pop
- Length: 4:28
- Label: MCI; BMG
- Songwriters: Frank Farian; Dietmar Kawohl; Peter Bischof-Fallenstein; Diane Warren
- Producer: Frank Farian

No Mercy singles chronology
"Where Do You Go" (1996)	"When I Die" (1996)	"Please Don't Go" (1997)

No Mercy's version of "When I Die" was released as the third single from their 1996 debut album, No Mercy, and its North American counterpart, My Promise, in November 1996 by MCI and BMG. This version reached number one in Austria and the Netherlands, number two in Australia, number three in Switzerland, and number five in Germany and Spain.

=== Critical reception ===
Larry Flick from Billboard magazine wrote, "With this lovely and instantly memorable pop ballad, Arista aims to cement the future of this charming male vocal trio as more than merely a flash in the disco pan. It's a realistic goal, given the strength of their performance here—it's warmly soulful and technically far more flexible than what the act has displayed on its previous dance hits. In a sea of jeep-styled sound-alike slow jams, this Latin-flavored gem should stand out quite nicely with its plush keyboards and delicate acoustic guitar lines. Not to be missed." Another Billboard editor, Paul Verna described it as a "brooding ballad", "which allows singer Marty Cintron to fully flex his boyish, star-powered charm." Dave Sholin from the Gavin Report commented, "Proving they're also adept when it comes to tackling a ballad, this Miami trio slows it down and blends some sweet harmony into a pretty melody." Diana Valois from The Morning Call felt it has Marty Cintron "sounding like a coy and eager Prince".

=== Track listings ===
- CD single
1. "When I Die" (radio) – 4:28
2. "For Eternity" (Manumission club mix) – 5:56
- European CD maxi
1. "When I Die" (radio edit) – 4:28
2. "When I Die" (extended) – 6:16
3. "For Eternity" (Manumission club mix) – 5:56
4. "When I Die" (unplugged) – 4:12
5. "Message of Love" – 3:08

=== Charts ===
==== Weekly charts ====
Chart (1996–1997)	Peak position
Australia (ARIA)	2
Austria (Ö3 Austria Top 40)	1
Belgium (Ultratop 50 Flanders)	7
Belgium (Ultratop 50 Wallonia)	27
Canada Adult Contemporary (RPM)	53
Estonia Airplay (Eesti Top 25)	22
Europe (Eurochart Hot 100)	8
European Border Breakers (M&M)	3
Germany (GfK)	5
Latvia (Latvijas Top 20)	9
Netherlands (Dutch Top 40)	1
Netherlands (Single Top 100)	1
Spain (AFYVE)	5
Spain Airplay (Top 40 Radio)	25
Switzerland (Schweizer Hitparade)	3
US Billboard Hot 100	41
US Dance Singles Sales (Billboard)	14
US Pop Airplay (Billboard)	37
US Rhythmic Airplay (Billboard)	21

==== Year-end charts ====
Chart (1997)	Position
Australia (ARIA)	30
Austria (Ö3 Austria Top 40)	4
Belgium (Ultratop 50 Flanders)	35
Europe (Eurochart Hot 100)	26
Germany (Media Control)	19
Netherlands (Dutch Top 40)	2
Netherlands (Single Top 100)	17
Romania (Romanian Top 100)	21
Switzerland (Schweizer Hitparade)	12

==== Decade-end charts ====
Chart (1990–1999)	Rank
Austria (Ö3 Austria Top 40)	45
Netherlands (Dutch Top 40)	37

=== Certifications ===
Region	Certification	Certified units/sales
Australia (ARIA)	Platinum	70,000^{^}
Austria (IFPI Austria)	Platinum	50,000^{*}
Germany (BVMI)	Gold	250,000^{^}
Netherlands (NVPI)	Platinum	75,000^{^}
^{*} Sales figures based on certification alone.^{^} Shipments figures based on certification alone.

=== Release history ===
Region	Date	Format(s)	Label(s)	Ref.
Europe	18 November 1996	CD	MCI; BMG	
Japan	22 January 1997	CD	BMG Japan	
United States	29 April 1997	Contemporary hit radio	Arista	
United States	6 May 1997	CD	Arista	
