= Verpiss' dich =

1996 single by Tic Tac Toe

Single by Tic Tac Toe

from the album Tic Tac Toe
- Language: German
- English title: Piss Off
- Released: 28 October 1996
- Length: 4:06
- Label: RCA; BMG
- Composer: Torsten Börger
- Lyricists: Tic Tac Toe, Claudia A. Wohlfromm, Torsten Börger
- Producer: Torsten Börger

Tic Tac Toe singles chronology
"Leck mich am A, B, Zeh" (1996)	"Verpiss' dich" (1996)	"Warum?" (1997)

Music video
- "Verpiss' dich" on YouTube

"Verpiss' dich" (English: "Piss Off") is a song by German female pop-rap group Tic Tac Toe, written by Torsten Börger, Claudia A. Wohlfromm, and Tic Tac Toe. The track is a breakup song, with its lyrics directed at the ex-partner who has left for another woman. The song was released as the fourth and final single from the group's self-titled debut album in October 1996 and topped the charts in Germany and Switzerland. The single sold over 800,000 units by late April 1997.

== Track listings ==
- German, Austrian, and Swiss CD single
1. "Verpiss' dich" (single mix) – 4:06
2. "Verpiss' dich" (Ich vermiss' dich mix) – 4:44
3. "Verpiss' dich" (Egal, verpiss' dich mix) – 2:59
4. "Verpiss' dich" (Ich weiß genau, du vermißt mich mix) – 1:53
- German, Austrian, and Swiss 12-inch single

A1. "Verpiss' dich" (Ich vermiss' dich mix) – 4:44
A2. "Verpiss' dich" (Ich weiß genau, du vermißt mich mix) – 1:53
B1. "Verpiss' dich" (Egal, verpiss' dich mix) – 2:59
B2. "Verpiss' dich" (single mix) – 4:06

== Charts ==
=== Weekly charts ===
Chart (1996–1997)	Peak position
Austria (Ö3 Austria Top 40)	3
Europe (European Hot 100 Singles)	9
Germany (GfK)	1
Switzerland (Schweizer Hitparade)	1

=== Year-end charts ===
Chart (1996)	Position
Germany (Media Control)	58

Chart (1997)	Position
Austria (Ö3 Austria Top 40)	18
Europe (Eurochart Hot 100)	47
Germany (Media Control)	25
Switzerland (Schweizer Hitparade)	40

== Certifications ==
Region	Certification	Certified units/sales
Austria (IFPI Austria)	Gold	25,000^{*}
Germany (BVMI)	Platinum	500,000^{^}
^{*} Sales figures based on certification alone.^{^} Shipments figures based on certification alone.
