= Where Do You Go (La Bouche song) =

Single by La Bouche and No Mercy

Single by No Mercy

from the album No Mercy/My Promise
- Released: 13 May 1996
- Genre: Dance-pop; Eurodance
- Length: 4:29 (album version); 4:08 (radio edit); 3:50 (video mix)
- Label: MCI; BMG
- Songwriters: Peter Bischof; Franz Reuther
- Producer: Frank Farian

No Mercy singles chronology
"Missing (I Miss You Like the Deserts Miss the Rain)" (1995)	"Where Do You Go" (1996)	"When I Die" (1996)

Music video
- "Where Do You Go" on YouTube

"Where Do You Go" is a song written by Peter Bischof and Franz Reuther. It was first recorded in 1995 by German Eurodance band La Bouche as an album-only track from their debut album, Sweet Dreams (1995). A cover version of the song was then recorded by German pop trio No Mercy, taken from their debut album, My Promise (1996). Produced by Frank Farian, it was released on 13 May 1996 as the trio's first single and became a worldwide hit. It entered the top five in Australia, Austria, Belgium, France, Germany, Hungary, Israel, Lithuania, Mexico, Switzerland, the United Kingdom, and the United States. The accompanying music video was directed by Hannes Rossacher and filmed in the US.

American entertainment company BuzzFeed ranked the song number eight in their list of "The 101 Greatest Dance Songs of the '90s" in 2017. In 2021, it was ranked number forty in their list of "The 50 Best '90s Songs of Summer".

== Content ==
"Where Do You Go" is a dance track with a 4/4 rhythm structure, running at a speed of 127 beats per minute. It is built around a drum beat that was sampled from the Todd Terry remix of the song "Missing", by English act Everything but the Girl. The chorus hook "where do you go, my lovely?" references Peter Sarstedt's 1969 hit "Where Do You Go To (My Lovely)".

== Critical reception ==
AllMusic editor Leo Stanley highlighted the song in his review of No Mercy, stating that "they have enough hooks and beats to crossover to the charts and dancefloors." Larry Flick from Billboard magazine wrote, "Look for this Latin male trio to continue Arista's winning streak of slam-dunking Euro-splashed dance ditties on pop radio." He added, "This time, the beats are spiked with fluttering acoustic guitar riffs and making for a jam that will have punters revisiting their fave old hustle dance steps. Icing on the cake is an immediately contagious chorus and an irresistible a cappella breakdown midway through the song. Fun, fun, fun." Matt Stopera and Brian Galindo from BuzzFeed noted, "Spanish guitar + aggressive '90s dance-music beat = perfection." A reviewer from Chicago Sun-Times deemed it "bewitching".

Bob Cannon from Entertainment Weekly said that "like any good dance track, its hook buries itself deep in your brain." He also complimented its "snazzy flamenco guitar licks and production touches". Dave Sholin from the Gavin Report commented, "This trio of experienced dancers/performers will find a warm reception from Top 40 programmers searching for fresh sounds to fill those pop/dance slots. The threesome hail from Miami and are currently breaking in Europe with this polished, uptempo production." Howard Cohen for The Miami Herald wrote, "The club song's sole distinction, aside from its fluttery flamenco guitar licks, is an insistently annoying chorus hook you can't shake." Diana Valois from The Morning Call stated that its guitar riff "still sounds irresistible". Alan Jones from Music Week said it "shuffles along in much the same style as 'Missing', with tasteful acoustic guitars and a nicely understated dance beat. Tuneful, well sung and very likely a hit."

== Chart performance ==
"Where Do You Go" was very successful on the charts all over the world, peaking at number-one in Israel and on both the Canadian RPM Dance chart and the US Billboard Maxi-Singles Sales chart. In Europe, it reached the top spot in Denmark, Ireland and Scotland. The single also entered the top 10 in Austria, France, Germany, Hungary, Italy, Lithuania, the Netherlands, Sweden, Switzerland, the UK, and Wallonia, as well as on the Eurochart Hot 100, where it reached number four. In the UK, "Where Do You Go" peaked at number two during its fourth and fifth weeks on the UK Singles Chart. Additionally, it was a top-20 hit in Finland and a top-30 hit in Iceland. Outside Europe, it reached number two in Australia, number three in Mexico, number five on both the US Billboard Hot 100 and Cash Box Top 100 charts, and number 27 in New Zealand. The single earned a gold record in New Zealand and the US and a platinum record in Australia, Germany, and the UK.

== Music video ==
The music video for "Where Do You Go" was directed by Austrian film director and film producer Hannes Rossacher and premiered in September 1996. It was filmed in Miami, Florida.

== Track listings ==
- 7-inch single
1. "Where Do You Go" (Radio Mix) – 4:15
2. "Where Do You Go" (Trip House Mix Edit) – 4:26
- 12-inch maxi
1. "Where Do You Go" (Trip House Mix) – 7:10
2. "Where Do You Go" (Manumission Mix) – 5:34
3. "Where Do You Go" (Spike Mix) – 6:22
4. "Where Do You Go" (Spike Dub Mix) – 6:07
- CD single
1. "Where Do You Go" (Radio Mix) – 4:18
2. "Where Do You Go" (Ocean Drive Mix) – 7:27
- CD maxi, Europe
1. "Where Do You Go" (Radio Mix) – 4:28
2. "Where Do You Go" (Ocean Drive Mix) – 7:27
3. "Where Do You Go" (Club Mix) – 7:10
4. "Where Do You Go" (Spike Mix) – 6:25
5. "Where Do You Go" (Spike Dub Mix) – 6:05
6. "Where Do You Go" (Manumission Mix) – 5:33

== Charts ==
=== Weekly charts ===
1996–1997 weekly chart performance for "Where Do You Go"
Chart (1996–1997)	Peak position
Australia (ARIA)	2
Austria (Ö3 Austria Top 40)	5
Belgium (Ultratop 50 Flanders)	32
Belgium (Ultratop 50 Wallonia)	5
Canada Top Singles (RPM)	43
Canada (Nielsen SoundScan)	1
Canada Dance/Urban (RPM)	1
Denmark (IFPI)	1
Europe (Eurochart Hot 100)	4
Europe (European Hit Radio)	30
Finland (Suomen virallinen lista)	15
France (SNEP)	4
France Airplay (SNEP)	1
Germany (GfK)	3
Greece (IFPI Greece)	6
Hungary (Mahasz)	2
Iceland (Íslenski Listinn Topp 40)	28
Ireland (IRMA)	1
Israel (Israeli Singles Chart)	1
Italy (Musica e dischi)	9
Latvia (Latvijas Top 20)	12
Lithuania (M-1)	5
Mexico (Notitas Musicales)	3
Netherlands (Dutch Top 40)	7
Netherlands (Single Top 100)	10
New Zealand (Recorded Music NZ)	27
Scottish Singles Sales (Official Charts)	1
Spain Airplay (Top 40 Radio)	28
Sweden (Sverigetopplistan)	6
Switzerland (Schweizer Hitparade)	4
UK Singles (Official Charts)	2
UK Airplay (Music Week)	7
UK Dance (Official Charts)	34
UK Pop Tip Club Chart (Music Week)	16
US Billboard Hot 100	5
US Adult Pop Airplay (Billboard)	16
US Dance Singles Sales (Billboard)	1
US Pop Airplay (Billboard)	3
US Rhythmic Airplay (Billboard)	4
US Cash Box Top 100	5

2026 weekly chart performance for "Where Do You Go"
Chart (2026)	Peak position
Poland (Polish Airplay Top 100)	51

=== Year-end charts ===
1996 year-end chart performance for "Where Do You Go"
Chart (1996)	Position
Australia (ARIA)	26
Austria (Ö3 Austria Top 40)	29
Belgium (Ultratop 50 Wallonia)	41
Brazil (Crowley)	90
Canada Dance/Urban (RPM)	34
Europe (Eurochart Hot 100)	19
France (SNEP)	13
France Airplay (SNEP)	25
Germany (Media Control)	9
Israel (IBA)	18
Sweden (Topplistan)	43
Switzerland (Schweizer Hitparade)	17
US Billboard Hot 100	26
US Maxi-Singles Sales (Billboard)	9
US Top 40/Mainstream (Billboard)	25
US Top 40/Rhythm-Crossover (Billboard)	27

1997 year-end chart performance for "Where Do You Go"
Chart (1997)	Position
Australia (ARIA)	82
Europe (Eurochart Hot 100)	51
UK Singles (OCC)	18
US Billboard Hot 100	52
US Maxi-Singles Sales (Billboard)	40
US Rhythmic Top 40 (Billboard)	79
US Top 40/Mainstream (Billboard)	71

=== Decade-end charts ===
Decade-end chart performance for "Where Do You Go"
Chart (1990–1999)	Position
Canada (Nielsen SoundScan)	25

== Certifications and sales ==
Certifications and sales for "Where Do You Go"
Region	Certification	Certified units/sales
Australia (ARIA)	Platinum	70,000^{^}
Germany (BVMI)	Platinum	500,000^{^}
New Zealand (RMNZ)	Gold	5,000^{*}
United Kingdom (BPI)	Platinum	600,000^{‡}
United States (RIAA)	Gold	700,000
^{*} Sales figures based on certification alone.^{^} Shipments figures based on certification alone.^{‡} Sales+streaming figures based on certification alone.

== Release history ==
Release dates and formats for "Where Do You Go"
Region	Date	Format(s)	Label(s)	Ref.
Germany	13 May 1996	CD	MCI; BMG	
United States	28 May 1996	Contemporary hit radio	Arista	
United States	18 June 1996	CD	Arista	
Japan	21 September 1996	CD	MCI; BMG	
United Kingdom	6 January 1997	12-inch vinyl; CD; cassette	Arista	
