= Warum? =

1997 single by Tic Tac Toe

Single by Tic Tac Toe

from the album Klappe die 2te
- Language: German
- English title: "Why?"
- Released: 24 February 1997
- Length: 3:22
- Label: RCA; BMG
- Songwriter: Thorsten Börger
- Producer: Thorsten Börger

Tic Tac Toe singles chronology
| "Verpiss' dich" (1996) | "Warum?" (1997) | "Mr. Wichtig" (1997) |

"Warum?" (English: "Why?") is a song by German female pop-rap group Tic Tac Toe. The song was written by Thorsten Börger and tells about a close friend of the group members, Melanie, who had developed an addiction to drugs and died as a result of overdose. "Warum?" was released as the lead single from their second album, Klappe die 2te (1997), on 24 February 1997 and was met with commercial success, reaching number one in Germany, Austria, and Switzerland as well as number four in the Netherlands. The single sold 700,000 copies in less than two months and remains Tic Tac Toe's biggest hit.

== Track listings ==
- German, Austrian, and Swiss CD single
1. "Warum?" (single mix) – 3:22
2. "Warum?" (Score I) – 4:00
3. "Warum?" (Out of Space Mix) – 3:44
4. "Warum?" (Score II) – 3:33
- German, Austrian, and Swiss 12-inch single

A1. "Warum?" (Out of Space Mix) – 3:44
A2. "Warum?" (single mix) – 3:22
B1. "Warum?" (Score I) – 4:00
B2. "Warum?" (Score II) – 3:33

- European CD single
1. "Warum?" (single mix) – 3:22
2. "Warum?" (Out of Space Mix) – 3:44

== Charts ==
=== Weekly charts ===
| Chart (1997) | Peak position |
|---|---|
| Austria (Ö3 Austria Top 40) | 1 |
| Europe (European Hot 100 Singles) | 4 |
| Germany (GfK) | 1 |
| Netherlands (Dutch Top 40) | 4 |
| Netherlands (Single Top 100) | 5 |
| Switzerland (Schweizer Hitparade) | 1 |

=== Year-end charts ===
| Chart (1997) | Position |
|---|---|
| Austria (Ö3 Austria Top 40) | 9 |
| Europe (European Hot 100 Singles) | 36 |
| Germany (Media Control) | 5 |
| Netherlands (Dutch Top 40) | 53 |
| Netherlands (Single Top 100) | 38 |
| Switzerland (Schweizer Hitparade) | 17 |

== Certifications ==
| Region | Certification | Certified units/sales |
|---|---|---|
| Austria (IFPI Austria) | Gold | 25,000^{*} |
| Germany (BVMI) | Platinum | 500,000^{^} |
| Switzerland (IFPI Switzerland) | Gold | 25,000^{^} |
^{*} Sales figures based on certification alone.^{^} Shipments figures based on certification alone.
