= Tic Tac Toe (group) =

German girl group

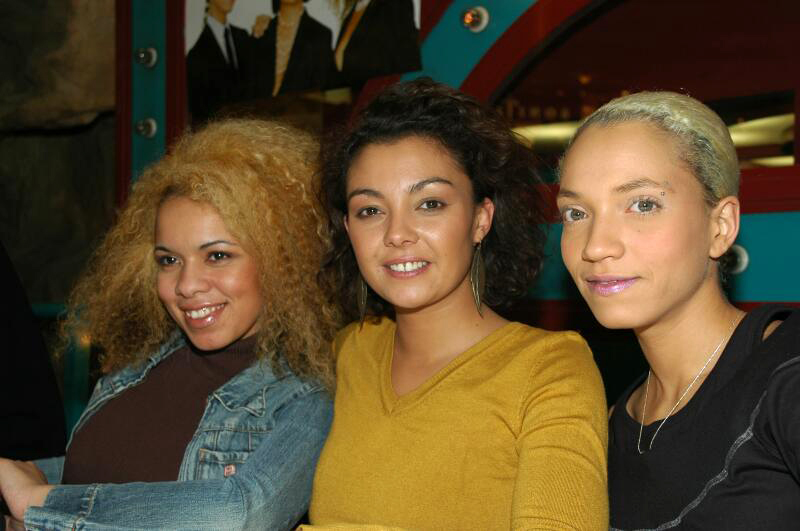
- Tic Tac Toe in 2006. From left: Ricarda Wältken, Marlene Tackenberg, Liane Wiegelmann

Background information
- Also known as: Tic Tac Two
- Origin: Ruhr, North Rhine-Westphalia, Germany
- Genres: Pop rap; rapcore; hip hop; pop
- Years active: 1995–2001; 2005–2007
- Labels: RCA; BMG; Sony BMG; A One Entertainment
- Past members: Liane "Lee" Wiegelmann; Ricarda "Ricky" Wältken; Marlene "Jazzy" Tackenberg; Sara Brahms

Tic Tac Toe were a German girl group formed in 1995, performing pop-rap music. Their first two albums, Tic Tac Toe and Klappe die 2te, were million-selling commercial successes and spawned major hits "Ich find' dich scheiße", "Verpiss' dich" and "Warum?". The band found biggest popularity in German speaking countries, the Netherlands and Eastern Europe. Due to numerous scandals and personal issues between the group members, Tic Tac Toe split in 2001. The band had a successful but short-lived comeback in 2005 with the hit single "Spiegel", but ultimately disbanded in 2007.

== History ==
=== 1995–1996: Formation and debut album ===
The band was established in 1995 by three young women from the industrial Ruhr area: Lee (Liane Wiegelmann), Ricky (Ricarda Wältken) and Jazzy (Marlene Tackenberg). Claudia Wohlfromm was the group's manager, and together with her partner Torsten Börger co-wrote all the songs for Tic Tac Toe. To appeal to young audience, the official band biography stated that all girls were in their teens, although only Ricky was actually a teenager when the group was formed.

Their first single was "Ich find' dich scheiße" in 1995, which caused a media stir due to its explicit title which translates "I Think You're Shit". The song became a major hit in Germany, Austria and Switzerland, and was followed by the band's self-titled debut album in the spring of 1996. It was a commercial success, reaching top 5 in the charts and going multi-platinum. The album spawned further singles, "Funky" and "Leck mich am A, B, Zeh", the latter song being about safe sex. However, it was the fourth single, provocatively titled "Verpiss' dich" (English: "Piss Off"), that became the band's first number 1 hit in Germany as well as Switzerland. Their public feud with fellow German rapper Sabrina Setlur was widely reported by the music press.

=== 1997–1998: Second album and controversies ===
In 1997 the band released their second album, Klappe die 2te. It became another multi-platinum success, topping German and Swiss albums charts, and has sold over 1.1 million copies in Germany alone. The lead single was "Warum?", whose lyrics were based on the story of a friend who had died of drug overdose. The track went to number 1 in Germany, Austria and Switzerland and remains Tic Tac Toe's biggest hit. Reggae-influenced "Mr. Wichtig" was released as the second single and reached the top 10. Two following singles, including "Bitte küss' mich nicht", a song about sexual harassment, charted outside the top 20.

During this time the press began writing unflattering articles about the band. The band members' true ages were revealed, and their biographies were reported to have been fabricated by the group. Liane Wiegelmann's marital status was made public when her husband committed suicide. It was also reported that Wiegelmann was using drugs, and that she had worked as a child prostitute for a two week period when she was 16 years old. Tensions between the band members escalated, and Ricky Wältken was reported to be struggling with stress-related issues. To prevent further damage to the band's image, their record company called a press conference in Munich in November 1997 to contradict the scandalous revelations and demonstrate the band's unity. However, the event took an unexpected turn when Ricky clashed against the rest of the band and the girls started to publicly argue and blame each other. The conference ended with Lee leaving the room in tears. As a result, Tic Tac Toe's popularity dramatically decreased. Ricky immediately left the band and embarked on a solo career releasing several modestly successful singles, although her solo album failed to chart.

=== 1999–2009: Comeback and definitive split ===
Lee and Jazzy performed as a duo for some time, before Sara Brahms joined the band. They recorded a single "Nie wieder" as Sara @ Tic Tac Two which was a chart success in 1999 and was later included on Sara's solo album. In 2000, the band released their third studio album, Ist der Ruf erst ruiniert..., recorded with Sara under their original moniker Tic Tac Toe. Three singles promoted the album, of which the most successful was "Isch liebe disch". The album itself did not fare as well in the charts as its predecessors and still in 2000 the trio disbanded.

Tic Tac Toe reformed in the original line-up in 2005, after Ricky had rejoined. At the end of the year the single "Spiegel" was released which was a top 10 chart success and brought the band back into the spotlight. To cash-in on the unexpected success of the song, their former label Sony BMG released a greatest hits album in early 2006. The following month, Tic Tac Toe's fourth studio album Comeback was released to modest chart success. The next single "Keine Ahnung" was their first to fail to enter the charts. The comeback concert tour was shortened due to lack of interest and in early 2007 Tic Tac Toe officially disbanded again.

Another reunion was rumoured in 2009, with Brahms replacing Lee, but in the end the project was abandoned. Lee has since completely withdrawn herself from the music business and in 2009 was reported as working as a cashier in a Cologne zoo. Jazzy has released solo music sporadically, and has taken part in musicals and TV shows.

== Members ==
Lee
Lee
Jazzy
Jazzy
Ricky
Ricky
Sara
│
1995
│
1997
│
1999
│
2001
│
2003
│
2005
│
2007
Band members and studio albums
- Lee – Liane Claudia Wiegelmann, née Springer (born 29 July 1974 in Iserlohn): from 1995 to 2001 and from 2005 to 2007
- Jazzy – Marlene Victoria Tackenberg (born 4 August 1975 in Gelsenkirchen): from 1995 to 2001 and from 2005 to 2007
- Ricky – Ricarda Priscilla Nonyem Wältken (born 24 February 1978 in Dortmund): from 1995 to 1997 and from 2005 to 2007
- Sara – Sara Brahms (born 24 July 1978 in Brighton): from 1998 to 2001

== Discography ==
=== Studio albums ===
Title	Details	Peak chart positions						Certifications
Title	Details	GER	AUT	EUR	HUN	NLD	SWI	Certifications
Tic Tac Toe	Released: 15 April 1996; Label: RCA, BMG; Formats: CD, cassette	3	3	15	—	—	4	GER: 2 × Platinum; AUT: Platinum; SWI: 2 × Platinum
Klappe die 2te	Released: 21 April 1997; Label: RCA, BMG; Formats: CD, cassette	1	2	5	27	43	1	GER: 2 × Platinum; AUT: Platinum; POL: Gold; SWI: 2 × Platinum
Ist der Ruf erst ruiniert...	Released: 29 May 2000; Label: RCA, BMG; Formats: CD, cassette	34	50	100	—	—	92	
Comeback	Released: 26 February 2006; Label: A One Entertainment; Formats: CD	25	26	73	—	—	43	

=== Compilations ===
Title	Details	Peak chart positions	
Title	Details	GER	AUT
The Best Of	Released: 13 January 2006; Label: Sony BMG; Formats: CD	51	35

=== Singles ===
Year	Title	Peak chart positions					Certifications	Album
Year	Title	GER	AUT	EUR	NLD	SWI	Certifications	Album
1995	"Ich find' dich scheiße"	3	4	15	38	6	GER: Platinum	Tic Tac Toe
1996	"Funky"	14	13	37	—	9		Tic Tac Toe
1996	"Leck mich am A, B, Zeh"	21	—	77	—	18		Tic Tac Toe
1996	"Verpiss' dich"	1	3	9	—	1	GER: Platinum; AUT: Gold	Tic Tac Toe
1997	"Warum?"	1	1	4	5	1	GER: Platinum; AUT: Gold; SWI: Gold	Klappe die 2te
1997	"Mr. Wichtig"	6	6	19	—	10	GER: Gold	Klappe die 2te
1997	"Ich wär' so gern so blöd wie du"	32	33	—	—	—		Klappe die 2te
1997	"Bitte küss' mich nicht"	47	—	—	—	—		Klappe die 2te
1999	"Nie wieder" (Sara @ Tic Tac Two)	4	4	13	—	4	GER: Gold	Spiesserparadies (Sara album)
2000	"Ist der Ruf erst ruiniert..."	27	—	—	—	—		Ist der Ruf erst ruiniert...
2000	"Isch liebe disch"	11	6	73	—	38		Ist der Ruf erst ruiniert...
2000	"Morgen ist heute schon gestern"	96	—	—	—	—		Ist der Ruf erst ruiniert...
2005	"Spiegel"	7	7	30	—	10		Comeback
2006	"Keine Ahnung"	—	—	—	—	—		Comeback
