= Fun Factory discography =

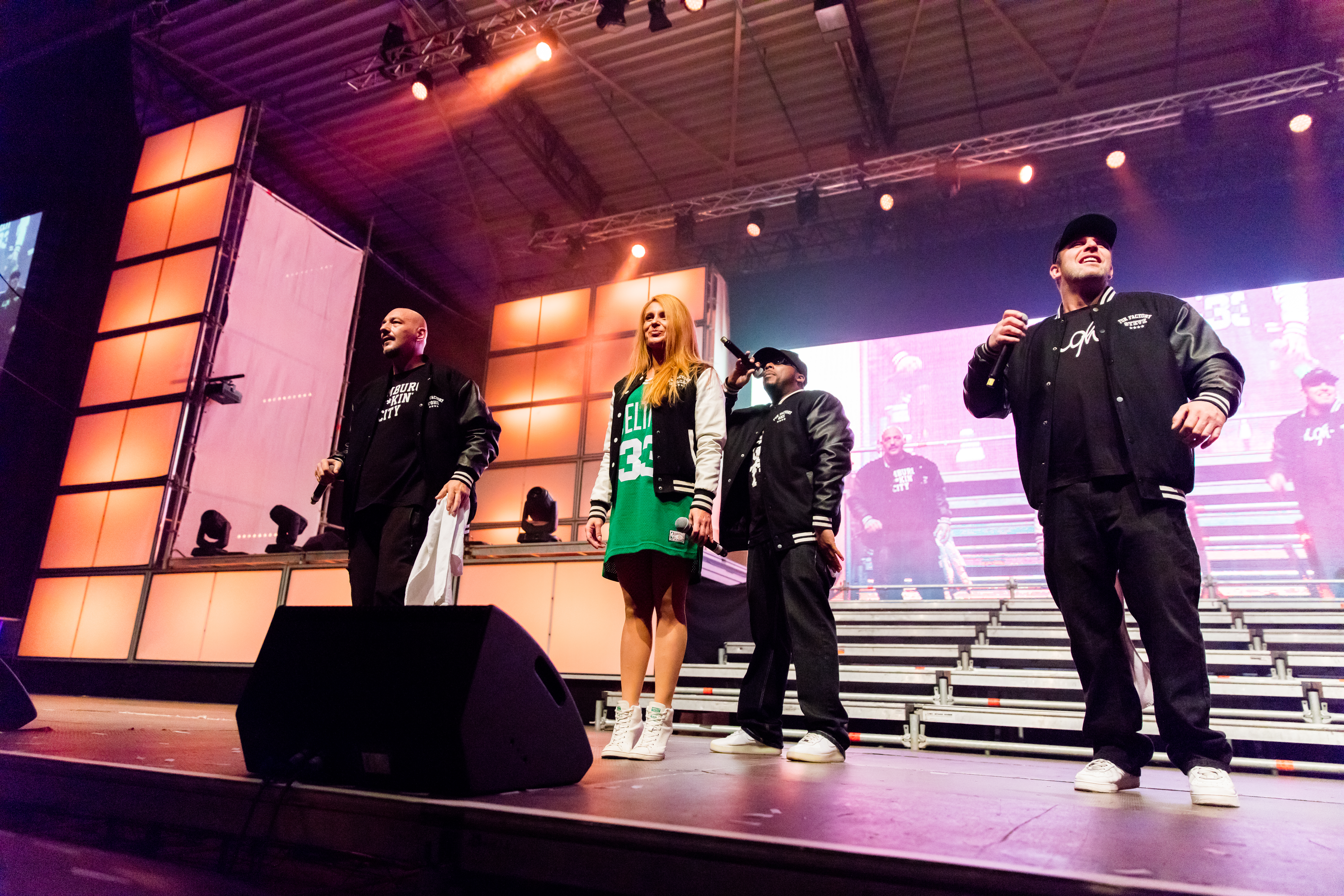
- Studio albums: 3
- Compilation albums: 1
- Singles: 23
- Music videos: 18
- Remix albums: 1
- Promotional singles: 6

The discography of Fun Factory, a German dance group, consists of 3 studio albums, one extended play, one compilation album, one remix album, 23 singles, including 3 as a featured artist, 6 promotional singles, and 18 music videos, including 3 as a featured artist. The first releases were the debut studio album Nonstop in 1994, preceded by the chart hits "Groove Me" and "Close to You", both released in 1993 and reprised on the 1995 album titled Close to You. "Take Your Chance" and "Pain" followed in 1994. This success was followed with the sophomore release Fun-Tastic in 1995, preceded by single releases "I Wanna B with U", "Celebration" and "Doh Wah Diddy", a cover version of Manfred Mann's song "Do Wah Diddy". Two more singles, "Don't Go Away" and "I Love You", have been released in 1996, both of moderate success, respectively. In 2015, Fun Factory returned with the single "Let's Get Crunk", the lead single of their third studio album "Back To The Factory".

== Albums ==
=== Studio albums ===
Title	Details	Peak chart positions			Certifications
Title	Details	GER	AUT	SWI	Certifications
Nonstop	Release date: April 24, 1994; Label: Regular Records; Formats: CD	41	—	—	
Fun-Tastic	Release date: November 6, 1995; Label: Regular Records; Formats: CD, Cassette	43	49	36	CAN: Gold
Back To The Factory	Release date: August 5, 2016; Label: Kontor Records; Formats: CD, Cassette	—	—	—	
"—" denotes studio album that did not chart.

=== Extended plays ===
Title	Details	Peak chart positions		
Title	Details	GER	AUT	SWI
Vol. 2 - Double A-Side	Release date: 1991; Label: Zeppelin; Formats: Vinyl	—	—	—
"—" denotes extended play that did not chart.

=== Compilation albums ===
Title	Details	Peak chart positions		
Title	Details	GER	AUT	SWI
All Their Best	Release date: November 15, 1996; Label: Regular Records; Formats: CD	—	—	—
"—" denotes compilation album that did not chart.

=== Remix albums ===
Title	Details	Peak chart positions		
Title	Details	GER	AUT	SWI
The Party - Nonstop Remix Album	Release date: September 21, 1999; Label: Victor; Formats: CD	—	—	—
"—" denotes remix album that did not chart.

== Singles ==
Year	Single	Peak chart positions										Certifications (sales thresholds)	Album
Year	Single	GER	AUT	CAN Dance	SPA	FIN	FRA	SWE	SWI	US	US Dance	Certifications (sales thresholds)	Album
1993	"Groove Me"	—	—	—	—	17	—	—	—	—	—		Nonstop
1994	"Close to You"	19	—	1	—	—	—	—	—	46	22		Nonstop
1994	"Take Your Chance"	18	—	5	—	—	—	35	37	88	—		Nonstop
1994	"Pain"	24	25	—	—	8	—	25	—	—	—		Nonstop
1995	"I Wanna B with U"	11	18	2	—	12	—	—	—	45	10		Fun-Tastic
1995	"Celebration"	12	—	9	10	—	19	—	—	88	—		Fun-Tastic
1995	"Doh Wah Diddy"	6	11	24	4	—	49	—	—	—	—	GER: Gold	Fun-Tastic
1996	"Don't Go Away"	37	31	—	6	—	—	—	—	93	—		Fun-Tastic
1996	"I Love You"	—	40	—	—	—	—	—	—	—	—		Fun-Tastic
2015	"Let's Get Crunk"	—	—	—	—	—	—	—	—	—	—		Back To The Factory
2016	"Turn It Up"	—	—	—	—	—	—	—	—	—	—		Back To The Factory
2021	"Memories"	—	—	—	—	—	—	—	—	—	—		—
2024	"Come on, Eileen"	—	—	—	—	—	—	—	—	—	—		—
2024	"Balkan Power"	—	—	—	—	—	—	—	—	—	—		—
"—" denotes single that did not chart.

=== Promotional singles ===
Year	Single	Peak chart positions			Album
Year	Single	GER	AUT	SWI	Album
1992	"Fun Factory's theme"	—	—	—	Nonstop
1994	"Love of my life"	—	—	—	Nonstop
1997	"Oh yeah yeah (I like it)"	—	—	—	Fun-Tastic
2009	"Shut up"	—	—	—	—
2020	"Oh Yaah"	—	—	—	—
2025	"Close To You (NATYS Remix)"	—	—	—	—
"—" denotes promotional single that did not chart.

=== Featured singles ===
Year	Single	Peak chart positions			Album
Year	Single	GER	AUT	SWI	Album
1996	"Love message" (with Masterboy, E-Rotic, Mr. President, Scooter & Worlds Apart)	4	12	12	—
1996	"Children" (as part of the supergroup Hand in Hand for Children)	19	—	—	—
2019	"Change" (with Captain Jack)	—	—	—	—
"—" denotes single that did not chart.

== Music videos ==
Year	Music video	Director(s)
1993	"Groove me"	Unknown
1994	"Close to You"	Apollon
1994	"Take Your Chance"	Steve Willis
1994	"Take Your Chance (U.S. Version)"	Unknown
1994	"Pain"	Chopstick
1995	"I Wanna B With U"	Music in Motion
1995	"Celebration"	Marcus Adams
1996	"Doh Wah Diddy"	Music in Motion
1996	"Don't Go Away"	V. Hannwacker & M. Rosenmüller
1996	"I love you"	Camelot
2015	"Let's get Crunk"	Unknown
2016	"Turn It Up"	Unknown
2021	"Memories"	Unknown
2024	"Come on, Eileen"	Unknown
2024	"Balkan Power"	Unknown

=== Featured music videos ===
Year	Music video	Director(s)
1996	"Love message" (with Masterboy, E-Rotic, Mr. President, Scooter & Worlds Apart)	Unknown
1996	"Children" (as part of the supergroup Hand in Hand for Children)	Unknown
2019	"Change" (Fun Factory feat. Captain Jack)	Tom Dannenberg
