= All Their Best (Fun Factory album) =

Compilation album by Fun Factory
- Released: 1996
- Recorded: 1993–1996
- Genre: Eurodance, electronic
- Length: 58:08
- Label: Curb Records
- Producer: Team 33

Fun Factory chronology
Fun-Tastic (1995)	All Their Best (1996)	The Party - Nonstop Remix Album (1999)

Professional ratings
Review scores
Source	Rating
AllMusic	4/5 stars
Music Week	3/5 stars

All Their Best is the first compilation album, third album release overall, by German Eurodance group Fun Factory. It was released in 1996 and features 17 tracks. On 20 March 2006, to celebrate the 10th anniversary of this release, Form Records re-released the compilation album with an altered cover art, but same track list except plus two bonus remixes, retitled 10th Anniversary Greatest Hits.

== Track listing ==
=== All Their Best ===
1. Celebration (radio party vocal)
2. Don't Go Away (Radio Walk)
3. Doh Wah Diddy (Dee Dee Radio)
4. I Wanna B With U (B On The Air rap)
5. I Love You (album version)
6. Pain (Feel The Pain mix)
7. Close to You (Trouble mix)
8. Oh Yeah Yeah (I Like It)
9. Prove Your Love
10. Love of My Life
11. Groove Me (album version)
12. Take Your Chance (Take The Airwaves mix)
13. Fun Factory's Theme
14. Doh Wah Diddy (Doh Wah NRG-remix)
15. Celebration (Slam rap extended)
16. I Wanna B With U (Homegirls International remix)
17. Freestylin'

=== 10th Anniversary Greatest Hits ===
1. Celebration (radio party vocal)
2. Don't Go Away (Radio Walk)
3. Doh Wah Diddy (Dee Dee Radio)
4. I Wanna B With U (B On The Air rap)
5. I Love You (album version)
6. Pain (Feel The Pain mix)
7. Close to You (Trouble mix)
8. Oh Yeah Yeah (I Like It)
9. Prove Your Love
10. Love of My Life
11. Groove Me (album version)
12. Take Your Chance (Take The Airwaves mix)
13. Fun Factory's Theme
14. Doh Wah Diddy (Doh Wah NRG-remix)
15. Celebration (Slam rap extended)
16. I Wanna B With U (Homegirls International remix)
17. Freestylin'
18. Close to You (Close To Ragga remix)
19. I Love You (short edit)

== Charts ==
=== Weekly charts ===
Chart (1997)	Peak position
Hungarian Albums (MAHASZ)	38

== Sources ==
- Discogs
