= Nana (album) =

Studio album by Nana
- Released: May 19, 1997
- Genre: Pop rap, conscious rap
- Label: Motor Music, Suburban
- Producer: Bülent Aris, Toni Cottura

Nana chronology
Nana (1997)	Father (1998)

Nana is the self-titled debut studio album by German rapper Nana. It was released on May 19, 1997. It was certified Gold by the German Bundesverband Musikindustrie and Swiss Hitparade. The album consists of eleven tracks and spawned four singles: "Darkman", "Let It Rain" (featuring Saskia Mireille Oldenstam), "He's Comin'" and "Lonely". The album's design was made by Katja Stier.

The album is dedicated to Nana's deceased mother Angela Adu-Adjei, who died of brain cancer.

== Track listing ==
Nana track listing
No.	Title	Length
1.	"Intro"	1:05
2.	"One Second"	5:42
3.	"Darkman"	6:00
4.	"Why?"	5:41
5.	"My Peeps"	4:51
6.	"Lonely"	6:21
7.	"He's Comin'" (featuring Bülent Aris, Necatin & Alex Prinz)	6:20
8.	"Darkman Reamaks"	5:09
9.	"Let It Rain"	3:55
10.	"1, 2, 3 Are U Ready?"	4:08
11.	"Mission (Booya)"	11:36

== Charts ==
Chart performance for Nana
Chart (1997-1998)	Position
Austrian Albums (Ö3 Austria)	22
German Albums (Offizielle Top 100)	4
Hungarian Albums (MAHASZ)	18
Swiss Albums (Schweizer Hitparade)	6

== Certifications ==
Certifications for "Nana"
Region	Certification	Certified units/sales
Germany (BVMI)	Gold	250,000^{^}
Poland (ZPAV)	Platinum	100,000^{*}
Switzerland (IFPI Switzerland)	Gold	25,000^{^}
^{*} Sales figures based on certification alone.^{^} Shipments figures based on certification alone.
