= All Their Best =

All Their Best may refer to:

- All Their Best (The Jets album)
- All Their Best (Fun Factory album), 1996
