= Fun-Tastic =

Album by Fun Factory

Studio album by Fun Factory
- Released: November 6, 1995
- Length: 58:08
- Label: Curb Records
- Producer: Team 33

Fun Factory chronology
NonStop! The Album (1994)	Fun-Tastic (1995)	All Their Best (1996)

Fun-Tastic is the second album by German Eurodance group Fun Factory.

Professional ratings
Review scores
Source	Rating
All Music Guide	3/5 stars

== Track listing ==
No.	Title	Lyrics	Music	Length
1.	"Dreaming"	Bülent Aris; Toni Cottura; Rodney Hardison	Bülent Aris; Toni Cottura	5:22
2.	"Celebration"	Aris; Cottura	Aris; Cottura	3:26
3.	"Doh Wah Diddy"	Jeff Barry; Ellie Greenwich	Jeff Barry; Ellie Greenwich	4:43
4.	"Oh Yeah Yeah (I Like It)"	Rainer Kesselbauer; Mathias Fiedler; Chris Götzki; Cottura; Hardison	Rainer Kesselbauer; Mathias Fiedler; Chris Götzki	4:50
5.	"I Love You"	Aris; Cottura; Hardison	Aris; Cottura	4:56
6.	"Don't Fight"	Aris; Cottura; Hardison	Aris; Cottura	5:57
7.	"I Wanna B with U"	Cottura; Zoltan Bender; Hardison	Cottura; Zoltan Bender	3:33
8.	"Together Forever"	Aris; Cottura; Hardison	Aris; Cottura	6:30
9.	"Don't Go Away"	Aris; Cottura; Hardison	Aris; Cottura	5:09
10.	"All For You (Close to You 2)"	Aris; Cottura	Aris; Cottura	4:20
11.	"Be Good to Me"	Kesselbauer; Fiedler; Götzki; Cottura; Hardison	Kesselbauer; Fiedler; Götzki	4:25
12.	"Back in the Days"	Aris; Cottura	Aris; Cottura	6:10

== Charts ==
Album

Year	Chart	Position
1996	Heatseekers	28

Singles

Year	Single	Chart	Position
1995	"Celebration/Take Your Chance"	Hot Dance Music/Maxi-Singles Sales	39
1996	"Celebration/Take Your Chance"	The Billboard Hot 100	88
