= New Fun Factory =

German pop-group

- Also known as: FF, The New Fun Factory, Fun Factory
- Origin: Hamburg, Germany
- Genres: Pop, Dance
- Years active: 1999-2003, 2005, 2008–2014
- Labels: Marlboro, Victor
- Members: Ela; Lisa; Dominique; Wyll
- Past members: Josephine Hiebel (1998–2003); Alfonso Losa-Eser (1998–1999); Annett Möller (1999–2003); Terrance Lamont Croom (1998–2003); Alexander Walser (1998–2003); Diana (2005–2009); Jenna (2005–2009); DGS (2005–2009); Douglas (2005–2009); Crash (2013–2014)

New Fun Factory was a German Pop group formed in late 1998, with rotating members, first comprising singer Lian Ross (Josephine Hiebel), rappers T-Roc/Tiger One (Terrance Lamont Croom), Alfonso Losa-Eser and Alexander Walser from Liechtenstein, who were the first of several spin-offs of the successful German dance group Fun Factory.

== Band history ==
=== 1998–99: Formation and Next Generation ===
When Fun Factory split up in 1997, a new group formed in the late of 1998, first comprising singer Lian Ross (Josephine Hiebel), rappers T-Roc/Tiger One (Terrance Lamont Croom), Alfonso Losa-Eser and Alexander Walser from Liechtenstein, who were the first of several spin-offs of the successful group Fun Factory. In particular, for some of their releases they have been credited as The New Fun Factory though they have also been credited as Fun Factory for better sales for the Asian Market and shared the same logo design. Other variations were Fun Factory #2, FF, New Fun Factory or Fun Factory Next Generation. The first single Party with Fun Factory, which samples J. Geils Band's song "Centerfold", has been released under the FF logo in 1998. Before their first studio album Next Generation, published on Marlboro Records, which has been released in 1999, lead singer Hiebel had been replaced with Annett Möller, an entertainer from Germany, though it has been later revealed, that Hiebel kept providing vocals in the background for all their later releases until their disbandment in 2001 with Möller just lip-syncing and performing with the group on stage. Also Losa-Eser left the band in 1998, leaving them as a trio. The album Next Generation has been released in the Asian market and sold over 100,000 copies. The album spawned two more singles, Sha-La-La-La-La and I wish, shortened and retitled Wish, which samples Michael Jackson's "Human Nature", in 1999. For the Party with Fun Factory and Wish single releases, the group has been promoted as simply FF and Sha-La-La-La-La as The New Fun Factory. Party with Fun Factory peaked #1.

=== 2000–04: ABC of Music and disbandment ===
Still in the band on a short break, Walser released a solo song Just for you, a contribution for the Eurovision song contest 2000. In 2002, New Fun Factory's studio album ABC of Music, published on Victor Entertainment, along with the single Tam tam taram tam, came up with the moderate success in the Asian market and the group was soon dissolved. On live performances they also covered and performed songs from the original Fun Factory. On December 21, 2002, they performed their very last concert at the In Club Gallery in Frankfurt, Germany before parting ways in early 2003. Each member has started solo careers, Walser back in California, USA, Croom back in Romania releasing his solo album in 2002 Tiger style under his name Tiger 1, and Möller retired from music, started a career in German television as a host for N-TV respectively. In the meantime, also Losa-Eser launched his solo career and released the singles Te quiero and Too late (...to be two strangers) in 2000 and 2001. Croom later joined Romanian band K1, with whom he released songs such as Ma luai or Plangeam in noapte.

=== 2005–09: Line-up changes and Buttons ===
In 2005, a group with all new members, now made of Diana, Jenna, DGS and Douglas, credited under the Fun Factory brand released the single Ilarie, which has been surfaced as a Fun Factory-credited single, along with the group, the credit has later been changed to Fun Factory presents Buttons and finally shortened to a solely band name becoming the group Buttons. In 2007, Walser released his single titled African queen featuring the rapper Que. In 2008, the band's single Be good to me was released. They performed at "ZDF Fernsehgarten", where they also performed their unreleased song Fiesta de samba, at "We Love The 90's" and toured around Germany, Poland, Slovakia and Romania. The single, I wanna B with U, a cover version of the original Fun Factory has been released in 2009 with an all new line-up respectively. In 2009, Walser released his single Living your dream, a collaboration with the singer Jermaine Jackson. The Fun Factory spin-offs have been produced by Rekardo Heilig.

=== 2010–2014: Singles, Return of Original Fun Factory and Disbandment ===
In October 2010, Ross has uploaded three songs to her YouTube account, titled Self Control, Crazy and Let it happen, all of them already had been previously recorded for the 2002 album ABC of Music. She herself labeled them as "Fun Factory & Lian Ross" for a better recognition. Also, Walser produced and released a song in 2011, called Trendsetter, a collaboration with the singer Joelina Drews. In 2011, Walser released his single Drunk, Drunk, Drunk. In 2012, the band consisted of Crash, Ela, Lisa and Dominique. In 2013, Crash has been replaced by Wyll. In 2013, the song On top of the world has been released. In 2014, their last single "B'Bang Bang" was released. In the same year, it was announced that the majority of the original members of Fun Factory from 1993 - 1997 would be returning to performing. They first returned under the name "Fun Factory: The Originalz" due to avoid confusion and legal issues with New Fun Factory, but later performed under "Fun Factory" after the cease of operations of New Fun Factory. No music has been made since.

== Members ==
| Member | 1998 | 1999 | 2000 | 2001 | 2002 | 2003 | 2005 | 2008 | 2009 | 2013 | 2014 |
|---|---|---|---|---|---|---|---|---|---|---|---|
| Josephine Hiebel (1998–2003) | | | | | | | | | | | |
| Annett Möller (1999–2003) | | | | | | | | | | | |
| Diana (2005–2009) | | | | | | | | | | | |
| Jenna (2005–2009) | | | | | | | | | | | |
| Ela (2013–2014) | | | | | | | | | | | |
| Lisa (2013–2014) | | | | | | | | | | | |
| Dominique (2013–2014) | | | | | | | | | | | |
| Alexander Walser (1998–2003) | | | | | | | | | | | |
| Terrance Lamont Croom (1998–2003) | | | | | | | | | | | |
| Alfonso Losa-Eser (1998–1999) | | | | | | | | | | | |
| Douglas (2005–2009) | | | | | | | | | | | |
| DGS (2005–2009) | | | | | | | | | | | |
| Crash (2013–2014) | | | | | | | | | | | |
| Wyll (2014) | | | | | | | | | | | |

Hiebel left the band in 1999, and has been replaced by Möller, though it has been revealed, that Hiebel kept providing vocals in the background for all their later releases until their disbandment in 2003 with Möller just lip-syncing and performing with the group on stage.

== Discography ==
=== Studio albums ===
| Title | Details | Peak chart positions | | Certifications |
| Title | Details | JAP | GER | Certifications |
|---|---|---|---|---|
| Next Generation | Release date: July 19, 1999; Label: Marlboro Records; Formats: CD | — | — | Japan: Gold (100,000 copies) |
| ABC of Music | Release date: August 21, 2002; Label: Victor; Formats: CD | — | — | |
"—" denotes studio album that did not chart.

=== Singles ===
| Year | Single | Peak chart positions | | Album |
| Year | Single | JAP | GER | Album |
|---|---|---|---|---|
| 1998 | "Party with Fun Factory" (Note: "Party with Fun Factory" has been labeled as "FF" for the release.) | 1 | — | Next Generation |
| 1999 | "Sha la la la la" (Note: "Sha la la la la" has been labeled as "The New Fun Factory" for the release.) | — | — | Next Generation |
| 1999 | "Wish" (Note: "Wish" has been labeled as "FF" for the release.) | — | — | Next Generation |
| 2001 | "I'll be there" | — | — | ABC of Music |
| 2002 | "Tam Tam Taram Tam" | — | — | ABC of Music |
"—" denotes single that did not chart.

=== Promotional singles ===
| Year | Single | Peak chart positions | | Album |
| Year | Single | JAP | GER | Album |
|---|---|---|---|---|
| 1999 | "House of love" | — | — | Next Generation |
| 2005 | "Ilarie" (Note: "Ilarie" has been later labeled as "Fun Factory presents Buttons" and finally "Buttons" for the release.) | — | — | N.A. |
| 2008 | "Be good to me" (Note: "Be good to me" saw a digital release only.) | — | — | N.A. |
| 2009 | "Uh la la" | — | — | N.A. |
| 2013 | "On top of the world" | — | — | N.A. |
"—" denotes promotional single that did not chart.

=== Other songs ===
- 2014: B'Bang bang
- 2009: Fiesta de samba (Unreleased)
- 2009: I Wanna B with U (Fun Factory cover)

=== Music videos ===
| Year | Music video | Director(s) |
|---|---|---|
| 1999 | "Party with Fun Factory" | Unknown |
| 2009 | "Uh la la" | Unknown |
| 2013 | "On top of the world" | Unknown |
