= Lonely (Nana song) =

1997 single by Nana

Single by Nana

from the album Nana
- Released: 7 March 1997
- Length: 3:54
- Label: Dance Pool
- Songwriters: Bülent Aris; Toni Cottura; Nana
- Producers: Bülent Aris; Toni Cottura

Nana singles chronology
"Darkman" (1996)	"Lonely" (1997)	"Let It Rain" (1997)

Music video
- "Lonely" on YouTube

"Lonely" is a song recorded by German rapper Nana. It was released in March 1997, by label Booya Music, as the second single from his debut album, Nana (1997). The song is written by him with its producers Bülent Aris and Toni Cottura and the chorus is performed by Aleksandra Jovanovic, Alexandra Prince and Jan van der Toorn. It became a successful European hit, reaching number one in Germany, Switzerland and Romania. "Lonely" also reached the top five in Austria, Denmark, and Norway. On the Eurochart Hot 100, it peaked at number seven in August 1997. The accompanying music video was directed by Swedish director Patric Ullaeus and premiered in April 1997.

== Track listing ==
CD maxi-single (Europe, 1997)

1. "Lonely" (Radio Mix) - 3:51
2. "Lonely" (Extended Mix) - 6:21
3. "Lonely" (Club Remix) - 5:17

== Charts ==
=== Weekly charts ===
Chart (1997)	Peak position
Austria (Ö3 Austria Top 40)	2
Denmark (IFPI)	2
Europe (Eurochart Hot 100)	7
Germany (GfK)	1
Norway (VG-lista)	3
Romania (Romanian Top 100)	1
Switzerland (Schweizer Hitparade)	1

=== Year-end charts ===
Chart (1997)	Position
Austria (Ö3 Austria Top 40)	38
Europe (Eurochart Hot 100)	52
Germany (Media Control)	7
Norway (VG-lista)	13
Romania (Romanian Top 100)	3
Switzerland (Schweizer Hitparade)	23

== Certifications ==
Region	Certification	Certified units/sales
Germany (BVMI)	Platinum	500,000^{^}
^{^} Shipments figures based on certification alone.
