= He's Comin' =

1997 single by Nana

Single by Nana

from the album Nana
- Released: 1 September 1997
- Length: 3:57
- Label: Dance Pool
- Songwriter(s): Bülent Aris, Toni Cottura, Nana, Jan van der Toorn
- Producer(s): Bülent Aris, Toni Cottura

Nana singles chronology
"Let It Rain" (1997)	"He's Comin'" (1997)	"Bible in My Hand" (1997)

"He's Comin'" is a song by the German rapper Nana. It was released in September 1997 as the fourth single from his debut album, Nana. The song reached number one in Romania and number four in Germany, as well as peaking at number 11 in Switzerland and number 14 in Austria.

== Track listings ==
CD single (Europe, 1997)

1. "He's Comin'" (Radio Mix) – 3:57
2. "Let It Rain" (Radio Mix) – 3:44
3. "He's Comin'" (Video Edit) – 3:57
4. "He's Comin'" (Extended Mix) – 6:19

== Music video ==
The music video was directed by Patric Ullaeus.

== Charts ==
=== Weekly charts ===
Chart (1997)	Peak position
Austria (Ö3 Austria Top 40)	14
Germany (GfK)	4
Romania (Romanian Top 100)	1
Switzerland (Schweizer Hitparade)	11

=== Year-end charts ===
Chart (1997)	Position
Germany (Media Control)	36
Romania (Romanian Top 100)	23
Switzerland (Schweizer Hitparade)	23

== Certifications ==
Region	Certification	Certified units/sales
Germany (BVMI)	Gold	250,000^{^}
^{^} Shipments figures based on certification alone.
