= Celebration (Fun Factory song) =

Single by Fun Factory

from the album Fun-Tastic
- Released: August 17, 1995
- Genre: Eurodance; pop rap; reggae fusion
- Length: 3:26
- Label: Scorpio Music; Regular Records; Victor
- Songwriters: Bülent Aris; Toni Cottura
- Producer: Team 33

Fun Factory singles chronology
"I Wanna B with U" (1995)	"Celebration" (1995)	"Do Wah Diddy" (1996)

Music video
- "Celebration" on YouTube

"Celebration" is a song by German Eurodance band Fun Factory, released in August 1995 by various labels as the second single from the band's second album, Fun-Tastic (1995). It features female vocals by Marie-Anett Mey and the rap parts is performed by Smooth T (a.k.a. Toni Cottura), who also co-wrote the song with Bülent Aris. A sizeable hit in Europe, it was a top-10 hit in Spain (10), and a top-20 hit in France (19) and Germany (12). Outside Europe, the single had some success in both North and South America, reaching number nine on the Canadian RPM Dance/Urban chart and number 88 on the US Billboard Hot 100, as well as becoming a top-10 hit in El Salvador. In 1996, a remix done by Mousse T. was sampled by French electronic music duo Daft Punk on their song "Revolution 909".

== Critical reception ==
Larry Flick from Billboard magazine wrote, "Speaking of musical calls for peace and unity, this red-hot Euro-dance act drops its standard rapid pace down to a per-cussive pop/reggae groove for this engaging plea for racial harmony. The result is the act's most appealing single to date. Do not be surprised if this is also Fun Factory's biggest hit, too. You are likely to be humming the chorus for hours after the first time you hear it."

== Music video ==
The accompanying music video for "Celebration" was directed by British director Marcus Adams. It was A-listed on German music television channel VIVA in November 1995.

== Track listing ==
- CD single, Germany (1995)
1. "Celebration" (Radio Party Rap) — 3:26
2. "Celebration" (Radio Party Vocal) — 4:03
- CD maxi, UK & Europe (1995)
1. "Celebration" (Radio Party Vocal) — 4:03
2. "Celebration" (Radio Party Rap) — 3:26
3. "Celebration" (Slam Rap Extended) — 4:28
4. "Celebration" (Mousse T's Back To The Old School) — 4:32
5. "Celebration" (Black Zone Remix) — 5:09
- CD maxi, Japan (1996)
1. "Celebration" (Radio Party Rap) — 3:29
2. "Celebration" (Radio Party Vocal) — 4:05
3. "Celebration" (Slam Rap Extended) — 4:30
4. "Celebration" (Black Zone Remix) — 5:06

== Charts ==
=== Weekly charts ===
Chart (1995)	Peak position
Canada Dance/Urban (RPM)	9
El Salvador (UPI)	10
Europe (Eurochart Hot 100)	90
France (SNEP)	19
Germany (GfK)	12
Iceland (Íslenski Listinn Topp 40)	39
Quebec (ADISQ)	11
Spain (AFYVE)	10
US Billboard Hot 100	88
US Maxi-Singles Sales (Billboard) with "Take Your Chance"	50
US Cash Box Top 100	83

=== Year-end charts ===
Chart (1995)	Position
Germany (Media Control)	86
Latvia (Latvijas Top 50)	76
