= Close to You (Fun Factory song) =

Single by Fun Factory

from the album NonStop
- Released: March 1994
- Genre: Eurodance; house; techno
- Length: 3:36
- Label: Scorpio Music; 12INC; Curb Edel Records
- Songwriters: Bülent Aris; Rainer Kesselbauer; Toni Cottura
- Producers: Bülent Aris; Toni Cottura

Fun Factory singles chronology
| "Groove Me" (1993) | "Close to You" (1994) | "Take Your Chance" (1994) |

Music video
- "Close to You" on YouTube

"Close to You" is a song by German Eurodance band Fun Factory, released in March 1994 by various labels as the second single from the band's debut-album, NonStop (1994). The song is written by Bülent Aris, Rainer Kesselbauer and Toni Cottura, while Aris and Cottura produced it. It received positive reviews from music critics, peaking at number-one on the Canadian RPM Dance/Urban chart and at number 22 on the US Billboard Hot Dance Club Play chart. Additionally, the single peaked at number 46 on the Billboard Hot 100 and number 14 on the Billboard Hot Dance Music/Maxi-Singles Sales chart. In Europe, it reached number 19 in Germany and number 97 in the UK. Its music video was directed by Swedish director Stefan Berg and filmed at a quarry. It was A-listed on Germany's VIVA in June 1994. "Close to You" uses the same melody as the 1993 hit single "Hold On" by German group Loft.

== Critical reception ==
Larry Flick from Billboard magazine wrote, "Taking a cue from Snap, this European-flavored dance anthem mixes soaring vocals with house beats and a snazzy rap. Multiple synthesizer riffs, a booming bass, and an amorous melody should keep the dance floor jumpin'." In 1995, "Close to You" was described as a "slick dance/pop ditty" and a "unabashedly gleeful twirler". Flick complimented the song's "contagious energy" and noted that "by the end of this toe-tapper, you will be singing along with the chorus as if it were second nature-the mark of a real hit."

Pan-European magazine Music & Media stated, "At 120+ bpm, Fun Factory's hard-edged techno experience is among the faster house tracks now storming charts everywhere." They added, "Thanks to a convincing chorus and a strong hook, its quick jump to number 22 in the German sales charts doesn't come as a surprise." Alan Jones from Music Week commented, "Marie-Annette sings, Rod D raps and the hugely commercial chorus surfaces at frequent intervals to reinforce the message that this is yet another continental invader that is bound for UK glory." Stephen Meade from The Network Forty named it a "high-energy dance track guaranteed to put a smile on your face." James Hamilton from the Record Mirror Dance Update called it a "typical girl cooed and guy rapped cheesy German galloper" in his weekly dance column.

== Track listing ==
- 12" (Remixes), Germany
1. "Close to You" (Energy Trance Mix) — 8:23
2. "Close to You" (Trance Radio Cut) — 3:40
3. "Close to You" (Peace & Positive Mix) — 5:42
4. "Close to You" (Doug's Club Mix) — 6:04
5. "Close to You" (Doug's Apple Mix) — 5:06
- CD single, France
1. "Close to You" (Radio Edit) — 3:36
2. "Close to You" (Close to Ragga Mix - Radio Edit) — 3:50
- CD maxi, Europe
1. "Close to You" (Radio Edit) — 3:36
2. "Close to You" (Trouble Mix) — 4:36
3. "Close to You" (Close to Ragga Remix) — 4:49
4. "Fun Factory's Groove" (Instrumental) — 5:34
- CD maxi, US
1. "Close to You" (Radio Edit) — 3:35
2. "Close to You" (Trouble Mix) — 4:45
3. "Close to You" (Close to Ragga Mix) — 4:48
4. "Fun Factory's Groove" (Instrumental) — 5:33
5. "Close to You" (Close to Trance Remix) — 5:09

== Charts ==
=== Weekly charts ===
| Chart (1994–1995) | Peak position |
|---|---|
| Australia (ARIA) | 171 |
| Canada Dance/Urban (RPM) | 1 |
| Europe (European Dance Radio) | 3 |
| Germany (GfK) | 19 |
| Peru (UPI) | 4 |
| UK Singles (OCC) | 97 |
| UK Club Chart (Music Week) | 59 |
| US Billboard Hot 100 | 46 |
| US Hot Dance Club Play (Billboard) | 22 |
| US Maxi-Singles Sales (Billboard) | 14 |
| US Top 40 Mainstream (Billboard) | 40 |
| US Rhythmic Top 40 (Billboard) | 28 |
| US Cash Box Top 100 | 41 |

=== Year-end charts ===
| Chart (1994) | Position |
|---|---|
| Canada Dance/Urban (RPM) | 50 |
| Europe (European Dance Radio) | 9 |
| Germany (Official German Charts) | 94 |
