= Marie-Anett Mey =

Marie Anett
- Born: June 3, 1971 (age 53); Paris, France
- Origin: Hamburg, Germany
- Genres: Pop, Electronica
- Years active: 1993–2000

Marie Anett (born June 3, 1971, as Marie-Anett Mey) is a French model, entertainer, singer and musician born in Paris, France. She gained popularity success throughout the 1990s as the lead vocal performer of the German eurodance music group Fun Factory.

== Life and career ==
=== 1971–92: Early life ===
Mey is born on June 3, 1971, as Marie-Anett Mey in Paris, in France. She moved to Hamburg in Germany where she met her future fellow Fun Factory band member Toni Cottura.

=== 1993–94: Joining Fun Factory and Nonstop ===
Before Fun Factory's third single release "Close to You" in 1993, Mey replaced lead singer Balca Tözün, who left the band and joined surviving founding members Rodney Hardison, Toni Cottura and Stephan Browarczyk. With the second line-up, the band gained massive success, though it has been later revealed, that Tözün kept providing vocals in the background for all their later releases until their disbandment in 1997, with Mey just lip-syncing and performing with the group on stage. "Close to You" became their first chart success peaking #1 at the Canadian Dance chart. Follow-up singles were "Take Your Chance" and "Pain" being chart hits as well, peaking at #18 and #24 in the German Single chart, respectively. Fun Factory released their debut album Nonstop in 1994. Mey started her side project in 1994 with the band Darkness, a group fronted by her and rapper Nana. Their single "In My Dreams" was a hit, whose female vocals were also by Tözün.

=== 1995–97: Fun-Tastic and disbandment ===
In 1995, Fun Factory released their singles "I Wanna B with U", "Celebration" and the cover version of Manfred Mann's "Doh Wah Diddy", peaking at #11, #12 and #6 in the German Single chart. In 1995, Fun Factory released their second studio album Fun-Tastic. By this time they began to become more popular throughout Europe and even saw some of their songs to chart in the United States and Canada. The follow-up single release was "Don't Go Away", becoming their yet last moderate chart success. "Don't Go Away" was also the last single to be promoted by the band as a quartet, when Cottura left the band. As a trio, the group released a last single, the ballad "I Love You". When Hardison left Fun Factory to join Garcia in 1997, with whom he released three singles, the remaining two members Mey and Browarczyk were joined by the new member Ray Horton and planned to continue with a rebranded band name Fun Affairs, but had no success with it and Fun Factory split up. In 1997, a first Greatest Hits album has been released to end up the chapter.

=== 1998–2000: Other projects and Solo career ===
In 2000, Mey briefly launched a musical solo career and released her first and only solo single "Be the One". The single also included another song, the B-Side "Light in My Life". A studio album hasn't been realized.

=== 2001–Present: Music retirement and other ventures ===
Mey became a make-up artist for the worldwide known make-up company MAC Cosmetics.

== Discography ==
=== Singles ===
- 2000 "Be the One"
