= NonStop (Fun Factory album) =

NonStop! The Album

Studio album by Fun Factory
- Released: April 24, 1994
- Length: 55:08
- Label: Regular Records
- Producer: Base B.

Fun Factory chronology
NonStop! The Album (1994)	Fun-Tastic (1995)

NonStop! The Album is the debut album by German musical group Fun Factory.

The original lead singer, Balca, appears only in one music video titled "Groove Me". Due to a disagreement, she separated from the group but because she was under a contract, she still had to continue singing for the band. She was replaced in visuals by Marie-Anett Mey.

== Track listing ==
No.	Title	Lyrics	Music	Length
1.	"Intro Jam"		Bülent Aris; Rainer Kesselbauer; Toni Cottura	1:15
2.	"Groove Me"	Aris; Rodney Hardison	Aris; Kesselbauer	4:16
3.	"Take Your Chance"	Aris; Cottura; Hardison	Aris; Kesselbauer; Cottura	4:32
4.	"Love of My Life"	Aris; Stephan Browarczyk; Cottura; Hardison	Cottura; Kesselbauer	5:03
5.	"Close to You"	Aris; Cottura; Hardison	Aris; Kesselbauer; Cottura	4:39
6.	"We are the World"	Aris; Cottura; Hardison; Browarczyk	Aris; Cottura	4:19
7.	"Fun Factory's Groove"		Aris; Kesselbauer; Cottura	3:35
8.	"Hey Little Girl"	Aris; Cottura	Aris; Cottura	6:46
9.	"Fun Factory's Theme"		Kesselbauer	3:05
10.	"Prove Your Love / Freestylin'"	Aris; Cottura / Hardison	Aris; Cottura / Cottura; Hardison	5:36
11.	"Pain"	Aris; Cottura; Hardison	Aris; Cottura; Kesselbauer	5:45
12.	"I Miss Her"	Guy Simone	Guy Simone	6:05
13.	"Close to You" (Close to Ragga Mix) (bonus track)	Aris; Cottura; Hardison	Aris; Kesselbauer; Cottura	4:36
14.	"Take Your Chance" (Take the Tribe Mix) (bonus track)	Aris; Cottura; Hardison	Aris; Kesselbauer; Cottura	5:53

== Charts ==
Singles

Year	Single	Chart	Position
1995	Close to You	Hot Dance Music/Maxi-Singles Sales	14
1995	Close to You	Dance Music/Club Play Singles	22
1995	Close to You	Top 40 Mainstream	40
1995	Close to You	The Billboard Hot 100	46
1995	Close to You	Rhythmic Top 40	28

== Sources ==
- Fun Factory.euweb.cz
- NonStop! The Album at Discogs
- NonStop! The Album at Allmusic
