= Alexandra Prince =

German singer and songwriter (born 1975)

- Also known as: Alex Prince
- Born: 1975 (age 50–51); Hamburg, West Germany
- Genres: Dance, house
- Occupations: Singer, songwriter
- Years active: 1997–present
- Website: alexandraprince.com

Alexandra Prince (born 1975) is a German singer and songwriter.

Alexandra Prince (born 1975 in Hamburg-Altona, West Germany) is a German singer and songwriter associated primarily with house and Eurodance music.

Prince began her career working with the Booya Family, contributing vocals to several releases, including Nana's 1997 single "Lonely". Her early solo work included "How We Livin'", recorded as Alex Prince featuring Mazaya.

She later collaborated with a number of electronic and dance music acts, including DJs@Work and Neo Cortex, and worked as a backing vocalist for the German Eurodance act Blümchen.

In 2005, Prince was featured on Gadjo's single "So Many Times", which she also co-wrote. The song reached number 22 on the UK Singles Chart. She subsequently collaborated with house music producers and DJs including Steve Angello, Sebastian Ingrosso, Syke'n'Sugarstarr, Till West and DJ Delicious.

Prince has also contributed as a songwriter and vocalist to recordings by other electronic music artists and producers.

== Discography ==
Year	Artist	Title	Credit
1997	Nana	Lonely	Vocals
1997	Nana	He's Comin'	Vocals
1997	Nana feat. Alex Prince	One Second	Vocals
1998	Alex Prince feat. Mazaya	How We Livin'	Vocals
1999	Alex Prince	Whatever	Vocals
2001	Madelyne	Beautiful Child	Vocals
2002	Laava	Wherever You Are (I Feel Love)	Vocals
2002	New Tone	Waiting for Your Love	Vocals, co-writer
2002	Gadjo	Besame Mucho	Vocals
2002	DJs@Work	Time 2 Wonder	Vocals
2002	Neo Cortex	Elements	Vocals
2003	Neo Cortex	Don't You	Vocals
2003	DJs@Work	Past Was Yesterday	Vocals
2003	DJs@Work	Some Years Ago	Vocals
2003	No Angels	Angel of Mine	Co-writer
2003	Vanessa S.	Shining	Co-writer
2003	Nalin & Kane vs. Denis the Menace feat. Alexandra Prince	Cruising	Vocals
2003	Phantom Black feat. Alexandra Prince	I Have Nobody (Deichkind Remix)	Vocals
2003	Phantom Black feat. Alexandra Prince	My Love	Vocals, co-writer
2004	Neo Cortex	Elements	Remix
2005	Gadjo feat. Alexandra Prince	So Many Times	Vocals, co-writer
2005	Fettes Brot feat. Alexandra Prince	Kuba	Vocals
2005	Neo Cortex	Storm of Light	Vocals
2006	Neo Cortex	I Want You!	Vocals
2006	Fireflies feat. Alexandra Prince	I Can't Get Enough	Vocals, co-writer
2006	Locktown feat. Alexandra Prince	Alive	Vocals, co-writer
2006	Syke'n'Sugarstarr feat. Alexandra Prince	Are You (Watching Me, Watching You)	Vocals, co-writer
2007	Neo Cortex	Hold Me Tonight	Vocals
2007	Giulia Siegel	Dance!	Vocals
2007	Alexandra Prince	Rising High	Vocals
2010	Syke'n'Sugarstarr feat. Alexandra Prince	So Alive	Vocals, co-writer
2010	Kool Savas feat. Olli Banjo and MoTrip	30 Sekunden	Vocals / appearance
2014	Kool Savas feat. Alexandra Prince	Limit	Vocals
2015	Neo Cortex	Elements 2k15	Vocals
2016	Ben Delay feat. Alexandra Prince	The Boy Is Mine	Vocals
2016	Mark Lower feat. Alexandra Prince	Always on My Mind	Vocals
2017	Ben Delay feat. Alexandra Prince	Out of My Life	Vocals
