= Do Wah Diddy Diddy =

1964 single by Manfred Mann

Single by Manfred Mann

from the album The Manfred Mann Album
- B-side: "What You Gonna Do?"
- Released: 10 July 1964
- Recorded: June 1964
- Genre: Rock
- Length: 2:23
- Label: His Master's Voice POP 1320 (UK); Ascot (US); Capitol (Canada)
- Songwriters: Jeff Barry; Ellie Greenwich
- Producer: John Burgess

Manfred Mann singles chronology
"Hubble Bubble (Toil and Trouble)" (1964)	"Do Wah Diddy Diddy" (1964)	"Sha La La" (1964)

"Do Wah Diddy Diddy" is a song written by Jeff Barry and Ellie Greenwich and originally recorded in 1963, as "Do-Wah-Diddy", by the American vocal group the Exciters. Cash Box described the Exciters' version as "a sparkling rocker that bubbles over with coin-catching enthusiasm" and said that the "great lead job is backed by a fabulous instrumental arrangement." It was made internationally famous by the British band Manfred Mann in 1964 and covered by Fun Factory in 1995.

== Manfred Mann version ==
It was soon covered by British R&B, beat and pop band Manfred Mann. Their version was released on 10 July 1964. It spent two weeks at No. 1 of the UK Singles Chart in August and two weeks at No. 1 of the US Billboard Hot 100 in October.

=== Critical reception ===
Billboard magazine said it "features powerful beat with Mann's solo echoed by male chorus." Cash Box described it as "a thumpin' novelty rocker that's right up the teeners' alley."

=== Charts ===
==== Weekly charts ====
Chart (1964)	Peak position
Australia (Kent Music Report)	2
Belgium (Ultratop Flanders)	8
Belgium (Ultratop Wallonia)	13
Canada Top Singles (RPM)	1
Finland (Suomen Virallinen)	4
Ireland (IRMA)	2
Netherlands (Single Top 100)	6
New Zealand Lever Hit Parade	1
Norway (VG-lista)	4
Sweden (Sverigetopplistan)	1
UK Singles (OCC)	1
US Billboard Hot 100	1
West Germany (GfK)	4

==== Year-end charts ====
Chart (1964)	Rank
Australia	19
US Billboard Hot 100	15

== Fun Factory version ==
"Doh Wah Diddy"

Single by Fun Factory

from the album Fun-Tastic
- Released: November 30, 1995
- Recorded: 1995
- Genre: Eurodance
- Length: 3:31
- Label: Curb
- Songwriters: Jeff Barry; Ellie Greenwich
- Producers: Bülent Aris; Toni Cottura

Fun Factory singles chronology
"Celebration" (1995)	"Doh Wah Diddy" (1995)	"Don't Go Away" (1996)

Music video
- "Do Wah Diddy" on YouTube

In 1995, German Eurodance band Fun Factory released a new version of "Doh Wah Diddy". It was released in November 1995 by Curb Records as the third single from their second album, Fun-Tastic (1995). Bülent Aris and band member Toni Cottura produced it and only a few lines of lyrics were retained, and supplemented by rap passages. The single was a top-10 hit in both Germany and Spain, peaking at number six and four, respectively. Additionally, it was a top-20 hit in Austria and a top-30 hit on the Canadian RPM Dance/Urban chart. The accompanying music video was directed by Frank Paul Husmann and produced by Music In Motion GmbH.

=== Track listings ===
- CD-maxi
1. "Doh Wah Diddy" (Dee Dee Radio) – 3:31
2. "Doh Wah Diddy" (Dee Dee Fun-Tastic Extended) – 4:43
3. "Doh Wah Diddy" (Fly Bass Remix) – 4:31
4. "Doh Wah Diddy" (Medium Houze) – 4:43
5. "Fun Factory's Theme II" – 3:24

=== Charts ===
==== Weekly charts ====
Chart (1996)	Peak position
Australia (ARIA)	152
Austria (Ö3 Austria Top 40)	11
Canada Dance/Urban (RPM)	24
Europe (Eurochart Hot 100)	33
France (SNEP)	49
Germany (GfK)	6
Spain (AFYVE)	4

==== Year-end charts ====
Chart (1996)	Position
Germany (GfK)	64

=== Certifications ===
Region	Certification	Certified units/sales
Germany (BVMI)	Gold	250,000^{^}
^{^} Shipments figures based on certification alone.

== Other cover versions ==
The song has been covered many times, notably by DJ Ötzi whose version titled "Do Wah Diddy" peaked at No. 9 on the Ö3 Austria Top 40, as well as charting in Germany, Switzerland, the UK and Ireland. Swedish singer Claes Dieden reached number 14 on Tio i Topp with his rendition in 1969.

A French cover version, "Vous les copains, je ne vous oublierai jamais", by Sheila was a top 10 hit in France in 1964.

== See also ==
- List of number-one singles from the 1960s (UK)
- List of Billboard Hot 100 number-one singles of 1964
