= Pain (Fun Factory song) =

Single by Fun Factory

from the album NonStop
- B-side: "Fun Factory's Slam"
- Released: November 1994
- Genre: Eurodance
- Length: 3:52
- Label: Scorpio Music; Regular
- Songwriters: Bülent Aris; Rodney Hardison; Toni Cottura
- Producers: Bülent Aris; Toni Cottura

Fun Factory singles chronology
"Take Your Chance" (1994)	"Pain" (1994)	"I Wanna B with U" (1995)

Music video
- "Pain" on YouTube

"Pain" is a song by German Eurodance band Fun Factory, released in November 1994, by Scorpio Music and Regular Records, as the fourth and last single from their debut-album, NonStop (1994). It is written by Bülent Aris, Rodney Hardison and Toni Cottura, and produced by Aris and Cottura. The song was a top-10 hit in Finland, peaking at number eight. In Germany, Austria and Sweden, it became a top-30 hit. Outside Europe, "Pain" peaked at number 30 in Israel. The accompanying music video was directed by R.T. Firefly (Rainer Thieding) and produced by Chopstick films. It received "buzz bin" rotation on MTV Europe and was B-listed on Germany's VIVA in January and February 1995. The CD single also featured the video for the band's previous hit single, "Take Your Chance". James Hamilton from the Music Week RM Dance Update described the song as an "instantly familiar cliches packed but powerful cheesy Euro galloper".

== Track listing ==
- 12", Germany
1. "Pain" (Feel The Pain Mix) – 4:50
2. "Pain" (Endless Pain Mix) – 6:54
3. "Pain" (Sequential One Club Mix) – 5:47
4. "Fun Factory's Slam" – 3:46
- CD single, France
1. "Pain" (Feel The Radio Vocal Mix) – 3:52
2. "Pain" (Feel The Pain Mix) – 4:50
- CD maxi, Germany, Austria & Switzerland
1. Video: "Take Your Chance" (The Video - Ultramega Multimedia Bonus) – 16:23
2. "Pain" (Feel The Pain Mix) – 4:50
3. "Pain" (Feel The Radio Vocal Mix) – 3:52
4. "Pain" (Sequential One Club Mix) – 5:47
5. "Fun Factory's Slam" (Instrumental) – 3:47

== Charts ==
Chart (1994–95)	Peak position
Austria (Ö3 Austria Top 40)	25
Europe (Eurochart Hot 100)	56
Europe (European Dance Radio)	15
Finland (Suomen virallinen lista)	8
Germany (GfK)	24
Sweden (Sverigetopplistan)	25
UK Pop Tip Club Chart (Music Week)	10
