= I Wanna B with U =

Single by Fun Factory

from the album Fun-Tastic
- Released: April 18, 1995
- Genre: Eurodance; pop rap; reggae fusion
- Length: 3:33
- Label: Scorpio Music; Regular Records; Curb Edel Records; Attic
- Songwriters: Zoltan Bender; Toni Cottura; Rodney Hardison
- Producer: Team 33

Fun Factory singles chronology
"Pain" (1994)	"I Wanna B with U" (1995)	"Celebration" (1995)

Music video
- "I Wanna B With U" on YouTube

"I Wanna B with U" is a song by German Eurodance band Fun Factory, released on 18 April 1995, by various labels, as the first single from the band's second album, Fun-Tastic (1995). The song was written by Zoltan Bender, Toni Cottura and Rodney Hardison. It became a top-10 hit in countries like Canada, El Salvador and Lithuania, and a top-20 hit in Austria, Finland and Germany. In the US, "I Wanna B with U" peaked at numbers 45 and 34 on the Billboard Hot 100 and Cash Box Top 100, and number ten on the Billboard Hot Dance Club Play chart. It remains one of their most successful songs and their biggest hit in the US. The track was released with remixes by Mousse T, Sequential One and Simon Harris.

== Critical reception ==
Larry Flick from Billboard magazine felt that songs like "I Wanna B with U" "are dance music in its purest and celebratory form." A reviewer from Music Week gave it a score of four out of five, writing, "A reggae-flavoured, summery song with the oft-repeated title line providing a great hook. Certain to make radio playlists, with big sales to follow." Rupert Howe from NME was less enthustiastic, saying, "Fun Factory may look like yet another instant melting-pot-noodle of a Eurobeat combo along the lines of Clock/Corona/The Real McCoy etc, but in a trick of Faustian proportions turn out to be merely a horrible tuneless facsimile of the already horrible and tuneless Ace of Base." James Hamilton from the Record Mirror Dance Update described it as a "plaintive girl chanted and gruff chaps rapped Euro reggae lurcher" in his weekly dance column.

== Music video ==
The accompanying music video for "I Wanna B with U" was directed by Frank Paul Husmann-Labusga, featuring the band performing at a garden party in a suburban area, and produced by Music In Motion GmbH. It also has a storyline of an elderly couple working in their garden who are disturbed by the music from their neighbor's party with Fun Factory. Eventually, the wife begins to dance to the music, much to her husband's annoyance. But by the time the video ends, they both dances to the music from the garden party. It was A-listed on German music television channel VIVA in June 1995. Same month, MTV Europe put it on prime break out rotation. In the UK, "I Wanna B with U" was a Box Top on The Box for three weeks in November 1995.

== Track listing ==
- 7" single, Germany
1. "I Wanna B with U" (On the Air Rap) — 3:33
2. "I Wanna B with U" (On the Air Vocal) — 3:33
- 12", Germany
1. "I Wanna B with U" (B On the Floor Extended) — 4:40
2. "I Wanna B with U" (B In the Groove) — 3:33
3. "I Wanna B with U" (Sequential One Remix) — 5:38
4. "I Wanna B with U" (Mousse T's Old School) — 4:16
- CD single, US
1. "I Wanna B with U" — 3:32
2. "We Are the World" — 4:08
- CD maxi, Germany
1. "I Wanna B with U" (B On the Air Vocal) — 3:33
2. "I Wanna B with U" (B On the Air Rap) — 3:33
3. "I Wanna B with U" (B On the Floor Extended) — 4:40
4. "I Wanna B with U" (Mousse T's Old School) — 4:16
5. "Fun Factory's Kick" (Maxi Edit) — 4:40
- CD maxi (Remixes), Europe
1. "I Wanna B with U" (Homegirls International Remix) — 5:38
2. "I Wanna B with U" (Mousse T's House Dub Edit) — 3:30
3. "I Wanna B with U" (Sequential One Remix) — 5:38
4. "I Wanna B with U" (Simon Harris' Jamaican Stylee) — 5:05

== Charts ==
=== Weekly charts ===
Chart (1995)	Peak position
Australia (ARIA)	145
Austria (Ö3 Austria Top 40)	18
Canada Retail Singles (The Record)	9
Canada Dance/Urban (RPM)	2
El Salvador (UPI)	2
Europe (Eurochart Hot 100)	59
Europe (European Dance Radio)	9
Finland (Suomen virallinen lista)	12
Germany (GfK)	11
Iceland (Íslenski Listinn Topp 40)	25
Lithuania (M-1)	10
Netherlands (Dutch Top 40 Tipparade)	11
Netherlands (Dutch Single Tip)	5
Quebec (ADISQ)	11
US Billboard Hot 100	45
US Hot Dance Club Play (Billboard)	10
US Maxi-Singles Sales (Billboard)	36
US Cash Box Top 100	34

=== Year-end charts ===
Chart (1995)	Position
Canada Dance/Urban (RPM)	21
Germany (Media Control)	50
Latvia (Latvijas Top 50)	85
