= Don't Go Away (Fun Factory song) =

Single by Fun Factory

from the album Fun-Tastic
- B-side: "Fun Factory's Break"
- Released: 11 April 1996
- Genre: Eurodance; pop rap; reggae fusion
- Length: 3:28
- Label: Attic; Curb Records; Edel; Form Records; Regular Records; Scorpio Music; Victor; What's Music
- Songwriters: Bülent Aris; Toni Cottura; Rodney Hardison
- Producer: Team 33

Fun Factory singles chronology
"Do Wah Diddy" (1996)	"Don't Go Away" (1996)	"I Love You" (1996)

Music video
- "Don't Go Away" on YouTube

"Don't Go Away" is a song by German Eurodance band Fun Factory, released in April 1996 by various labels as the fourth single from the band's second album, Fun-Tastic (1995). It is written by Bülent Aris, Toni Cottura and Rodney Hardison, and was a success especially in Spain, peaking at number six. Additionally, the single was a top-40 hit in Austria and Germany. Outside Europe, "Don't Go Away" reached number 93 on the Billboard Hot 100 chart in the US. Its accompanying music video was directed by V. Hannwacker & M. Rosenmüller, featuring the band performing at a party on the beach.

== Critical reception ==
Larry Flick from Billboard magazine described the song as "a reggae-splashed ditty", comparing it to Ace of Base's 1992 hit "All That She Wants". He added that the key difference is "the use of throaty male rapping, as well as a slew of versions that tip-toe through jeep-funk and house grooves". British magazine Music Week gave it a score of three out of five, writing, "Jolly reggae'n rap from the band who sell in huge quantities on the Continent, but have yet to make an impact here."

== Track listing ==
- 12" single, France (1996)
1. "Don't Go Away" (Real House Walk) — 4:41
2. "Don't Go Away" (Funky Dub Walk) — 4:55
3. "Don't Go Away" (Extended Walk) — 4:55
4. "Fun Factory's Break" — 4:31
- CD single, US (1996)
1. "Don't Go Away"
2. "Do Wah Diddy Diddy"
- CD maxi, Germany (1996)
1. "Don't Go Away" (Radio Walk) — 3:28
2. "Don't Go Away" (Extended Walk) — 4:55
3. "Don't Go Away" (Funky Dub Walk) — 4:55
4. "Don't Go Away" (Real House Walk) — 4:41
5. "Fun Factory's Break" — 4:31

== Charts ==
Chart (1996)	Peak position
Austria (Ö3 Austria Top 40)	31
Europe (Eurochart Hot 100)	91
Europe (European Dance Radio)	12
Germany (GfK)	37
Spain (AFYVE)	6
UK Singles (OCC)	183
US Billboard Hot 100	93
