= Fun Factory (band) =

German band

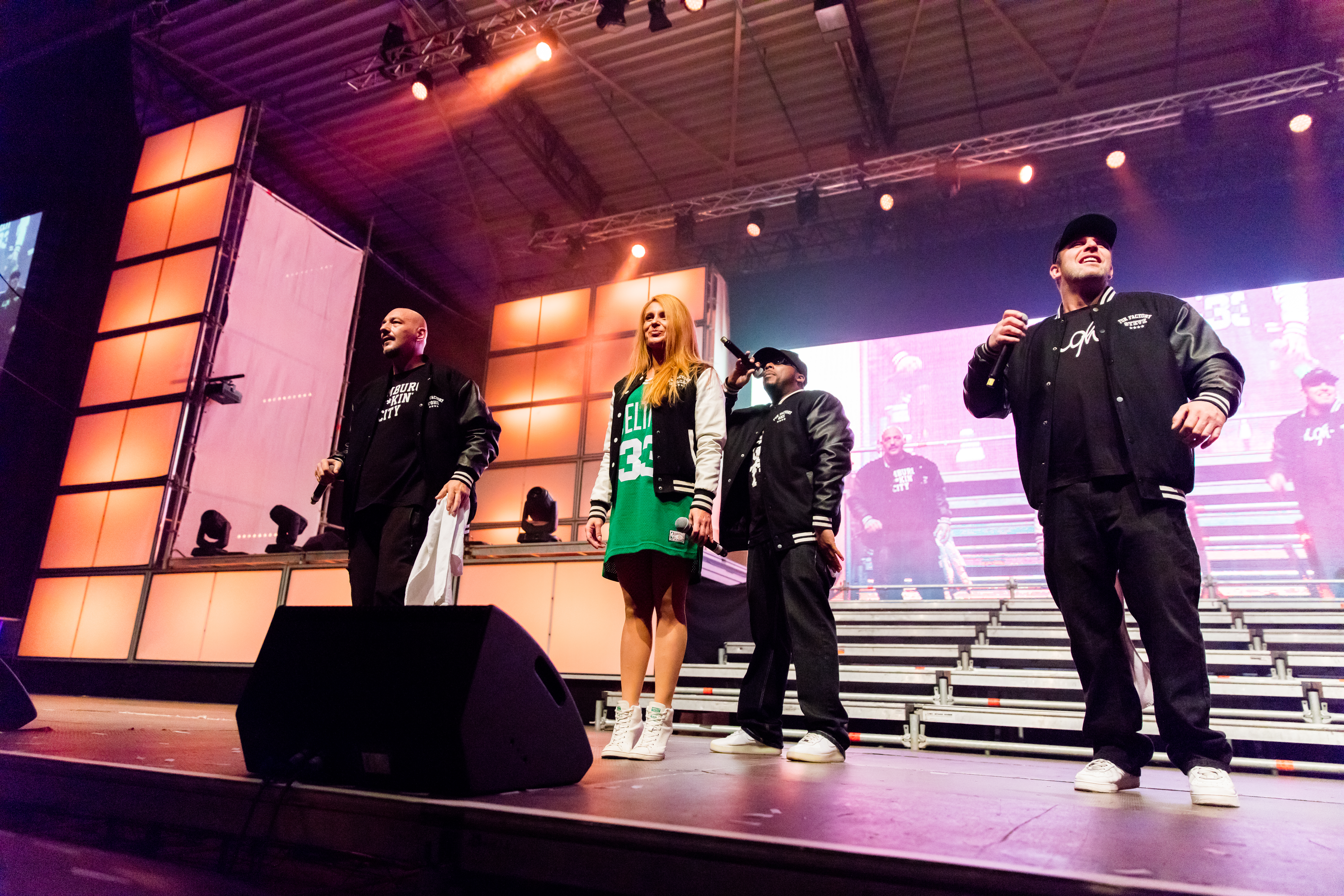
- Fun Factory performing in 2015

Background information
- Also known as: The Originalz FF Members of Fun Factory, S.T.S.B. fka Fun Factory, Fun Factory: The Originalz
- Origin: Hamburg, Germany
- Genre: Eurodance
- Years active: 1992–1997, 2009, 2013–2021, 2024–present
- Members: Toni Cottura; Stephan Browarczyk; Balca Tözün; Anthony Freeman
- Past members: Marie-Anett Mey; Rodney Hardison; Douglas; DGS; Jasmin
- Website: FunFactory webpage

Fun Factory is a German eurodance group formed in 1992, originally consisting of founding members Balca Tözün, Rodney Hardison, Toni Cottura and Stephan Browarczyk. They have been nicknamed simply Balja, Rod D., Smooth T. and Steve respectively. The group achieved significant success throughout the 1990s.

== History ==
=== 1992–94: Formation, Non Stop-The Album and Balca's departure ===
The group was founded in 1992 with Balca Tözün from Turkey, Rodney Hardison from the United States, and Toni Cottura and Stephan Browarczyk from Germany. They released their first singles "Fun Factory's Theme" and "Groove Me" in 1992 and 1993. Fun Factory released their debut album Nonstop! The Album in 1994. Before their third single release "Close to You" in late 1993, the group reported that lead singer Balca Tözün had been replaced with Marie-Anett Mey, an entertainer from Paris, France. "Close to You" became their first chart success, peaking at number 1 on the Canadian Dance chart. Follow-up singles were "Take Your Chance" and "Pain", which peaked at 18 and 24 respectively on the German Singles Chart.

=== 1995–97: Fun-Tastic and disbandment ===
In 1995, the band released their singles "I Wanna B with U", "Celebration" and the Manfred Mann cover version "Do Wah Diddy". They were all chart hits, peaking at nos. 11, 12 and 6 on the German Singles Charts. The same year, Fun Factory released their second Studio Album Fun-Tastic. By this time they began to become more popular throughout Europe, the United States, and Canada. The follow-up single release was "Don't Go Away", becoming their last chart success. Following the release of "Don't Go Away", Cottura left the band. As a trio, the group released two more singles, "I Love You" and "Oh Yeah Yeah (I Like It)". For the single version of "I Love You", the first rap verse by Cottura was re-recorded by Browarczyk. In 1996, Cottura started releasing solo singles and founded the record label Booya Family, where he produced tracks for a variety of artists including NANA, Marky Mark, 'N Sync, and Backstreet Boys. In 1997, a Fun Factory Greatest Hits album was released. Hardison left Fun Factory in 1997; the remaining two members Mey and Browarczyk were joined by the new member Ray Horton and planned to continue with a rebranded band name "Fun Affairs", but saw little success and Fun Factory split up.

=== 1998–08: Solo projects and Fun Factory spin-offs ===
In 1998, a Fun Factory spin-off was introduced with an all-new line-up, with rotating members, first comprising singer Lian Ross (Josephine Hiebel), rappers T-Roc/Tiger One (Terrance Lamont Croom), Alfonso Losa-Eser and Alexander Walser from Liechtenstein. On some of their releases they have been credited as The New Fun Factory. The first studio album Next Generation, published on Marlboro Records, was released in 1999 and sold over 100,000 copies, along with the singles "Party With Fun Factory", "Sha-La-La-La-La" and "Wish" in 1998 and 1999. In 2000, Mey released her first and only solo single, "Be the One". In 2002, New Fun Factory's studio album ABC of Music, saw moderate success and the group was soon dissolved. In 2008, a group with all new members, credited under the Fun Factory brand released their first single titled "Be Good To Me". They performed at ZDF Fernsehgarten and toured in Germany, Poland, Slovakia and Romania. Two more singles, "I Wanna B With U 2010", a cover version of the original, and "On Top Of The World", were released in 2009 and 2013 respectively.

=== 2009–19: Return of Balca and comeback with Back to the Factory ===
In December 2009, a promotional single titled "Shut Up" was released, which marked the first song since 1995 where founding members Cottura and Tözün were involved. In 2013, three of four founding members, Tözün, Cottura and Browarczyk, reunited for performances. They were joined by new rapper Ski (Anthony Freeman) from New York City. They gave their first full concert, credited as 'The Originalz FF Members of Fun Factory', in Poland on October 26, 2013, where they also presented the new song "Hands Up (Give Me Your Heart)". In 2014, the group began performing as Fun Factory again.

On August 7, 2015, the single "Let's Get Crunk" was released. On July 15, 2016, "Turn It Up" was released, followed by the group's third studio album, Back to the Factory, in August. Between 2017 and 2019, the group went on tour, mainly on 90s festivals in Germany, Finland, Hungary, Poland and Czechia. In 2019, Fun Factory released the collaborative single "Change" alongside Captain Jack.

=== 2020–23: Singles and brief Line-up change ===
On August 28, 2020, Fun Factory released the promotional reggaeton single "Oh Yaah", followed by the single "Memories" on February 22, 2021. The accompanying music video premiered in the same month. The song was originally planned to be their final single as the band announced all members were leaving the project and a cast for the new members was following. However Balja, Toni, Steve and Anthony still performed together under the alias "S.T.S.B. fka Fun Factory" possibly due to a name dispute. After over a year of inactivity, the producers of the Fun Factory and New Fun Factory projects have recruited two former members of the New Fun Factory pool, Douglas and DGS, alongside new singer Jasmin, to present Fun Factory. In July 2023, the group released the single, "Uh La La" (not to be confused with "Uh La La", a different song also released by the New Fun Factory members labeled as Fun Factory back in 2009).

=== 2024–present: Second Return and Singles ===
In 2024, the original members returned to use the Fun Factory name and released a string of singles, "Come on, Eileen" on August 23, and "Balkan Power" on October 18, 2024, with accompanying music videos. On April 18, 2025, the band released a remix by NATYS for their early hit "Close To You".

==== Rodney Hardison Accident ====
In April 2025, former member Rodney Hardison was injured while working on his classic car in Los Angeles. The vehicle unexpectedly slipped into reverse, knocking him over and running him over, pinning him to the ground with his head inches from the tire. He sustained a shattered hip broken in three places, requiring multiple hospital transfers, trauma care, and ongoing intensive rehabilitation. Medical staff described his survival as a "miracle," given the circumstances. As of mid-May 2025, Hardison was unable to work and focused on relearning to walk, showing strong determination in therapy.

== Members ==
Member	1992	1993	1994	1995	1996	1997	2009	2013	2014	2015	2016	2017	2018	2019	2020	2021
Balca Tözün (1992–1993, 2009, 2013–2021)																
Marie-Anett Mey (1993–1997)																
Toni Cottura (1992–1996, 2009, 2013–2021)																
Stephan Browarczyk (1992–1997, 2013–2021)																
Rodney Hardison (1992–1997)																
Anthony Freeman (2013–2021)																

- Tözün was said to have left the band in 1993 and was replaced by Mey, however, Tözün continued to provide uncredited vocals for all their later releases until their disbandment in 1997 with Mey serving as a visual, lip-syncing and performing with the group on stage.
- In 2023, former New Fun Factory members Douglas and DGS, alongside new singer Jasmin, briefly presented "Uh La La" labeled as Fun Factory.

== Discography ==
- Nonstop! The Album (1994)
- Fun-Tastic (1995)
- Back To The Factory (2016)
