= Nana (rapper) =

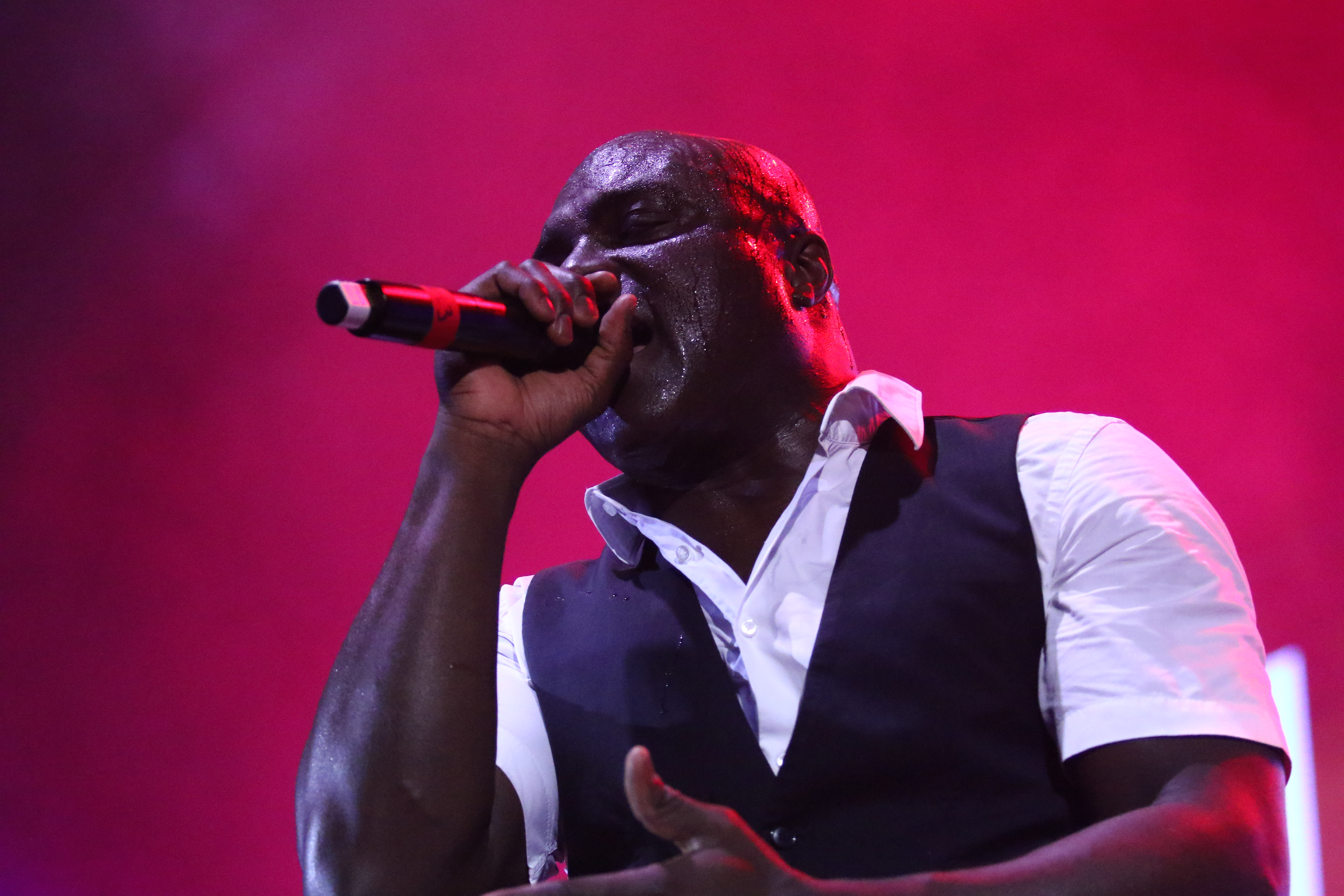

Background information
- Born: Nana Kwame Abrokwa; October 5, 1968 (age 57); Accra, Ghana
- Origin: Hamburg, Germany
- Genres: Hip hop, eurodance
- Occupation: Rapper
- Years active: 1996–present
- Labels: Motor Music GMBH; Darkman Records
- Website: https://nanadarkman.com/

Nana Kwame Abrokwa (born 5 October 1968) is a Ghanaian born German rapper and DJ, performing under the pseudonyms Nana or Darkman. Nana is not an actual first name, but is rather a Ghanaian title of nobility. His 1996 self-titled debut album was certified Platinum in Poland and Gold in Germany and Switzerland. The album spawned the 1997 hit single, "Lonely", which reached number-one in Germany and Switzerland, and was certified Platinum in Germany.

== Early life ==
Nana arrived in Hamburg, Germany, with his mother and his brothers at the age of 10.

== Musical career ==
=== Beginnings ===
At the beginning of the 90s, his debut consisted of DJing in hip-hop clubs. He also co-produced and rapped in some songs of DJ David Fascher ("Here We Go", "Make The Crowd Go Wild"), under the alias MC Africa True.

=== 1994: Eurodance project and departure ===
In 1994 he joined the Eurodance project Darkness as a rapper, which was produced by Bülent Aris and Toni Cottura. The song "Dreams" became a club hit, but Nana did not feel very comfortable with the style Darkness adopted and the group separated. However, his current scene name, Darkman, originated from this time.

=== 1996-1997: Debut album and commercial success ===
In 1996 Aris and Cottura founded the Black Music label Booya Music, which Nana joined as the first artist. The first single, "Darkman" reached the top 10 of Germany's official single-chart by Media Control. The following single, "Lonely", became the most successful euro-rap song, being number-one for several weeks. The album, Nana, released in 1997, is more on the mainstream, American style of rapping. It features numerous other members of the Booya Family, such as Jan van der Toorn and Alex Prince.

=== 1998: Father ===
The second album, Father, was released in May 1998 and contains slower pieces and more personal lyrics. The songs "Too Much Heaven" and "War" were also featured on the tribute albums Love The Bee Gees and Hands on Motown.

=== 1999-2004: Single releases and hiatus ===
At the end of 1999, Nana's released the single "I Wanna Fly", which flopped, due to a decrease in euro-rap's popularity and the growing importance of hip-hop played in German. Nevertheless, Nana still recorded two further albums with Booya Music, which were not released due to legal problems.

At the beginning of 2001 Nana released the German-language song Du wirst sehen, a gesture which was not appreciated by international fans. The single flopped, and the planned bilingual album Global Playa was canceled at the request of the record company.

=== 2004: All Doors in Flight No. 7 ===
After a long break, Nana made his highly anticipated return in the summer of 2004 with the release of his album All Doors In Flight No. 7. Featuring collaborations with Jan van der Toorn and Manuell, the album was launched under Nana’s own label, Darkman Records. It was distributed exclusively online through Nana’s official website.

=== 2022: Team Darkman (The Storm After the Calm) ===
After the COVID-19 pandemic, Nana made a return to touring across Europe in August 2022, accompanied by his newly appointed official backing singer, Polish R&B singer-songwriter Graciano Markowski, known professionally as Graciano Major. Their collaboration went beyond live performances—Nana and Graciano also teamed up in the studio, releasing their single “One Night Stand” in 2021 under Nana’s own label, Darkman Records. The track was distributed online and made available across major digital streaming platforms. In October 2022, Graciano Major collaborated with Lebanese electronic music producer and DJ Ramzy Shaar to remix Graciano’s Single “Dubai”, which was released under the label Cat Music. The official Ramzy Shaar remix of “Dubai” is now featured in Graciano Major’s live performances alongside Nana.

== Discography ==
=== Studio albums ===
Year	Title	Chart positions			Certifications
Year	Title	AUT	GER	SUI	Certifications
1997	Nana	22	4	6	GER: Gold SUI: Gold POL: Platinum
1998	Father	17	4	8	
2004	All Doors in Flight No. 7	—	—	—	
2008	12 Y.O.	—	—	—	
2010	Stand Up	—	—	—	

=== Singles ===
Year	Single	Peak chart positions						Certifications (sales thresholds)	Album
Year	Single	AUT	DEN	GER	NED	NOR	SUI	Certifications (sales thresholds)	Album
1996	"Darkman"	—	—	9	71	—	20		Nana
1997	"Lonely"	2	4	1	—	3	1	GER: Platinum	Nana
1997	"Let It Rain"	22	—	12	—	—	48		Nana
1997	"He's Comin'"	14	—	4	—	—	11	GER: Gold	Nana
1997	"Bible in My Hand"	—	—	54	—	—	—		Single only
1998	"Too Much Heaven"	6	—	2	—	—	7	GER: Gold	Father
1998	"Remember the Time"	10	—	6	—	—	10	GER: Gold	Father
1998	"Dreams"	—	—	18	—	—	—		Father
1999	"I Wanna Fly (Like an Eagle)"	—	—	84	—	—	—		Single only
"—" denotes releases that did not chart

== Awards ==
- 1997: Comet Award for "Best German debut"
- 1998: ECHO for "Most successful German debut"
- 1998: ECHO for "Most successful German artist"
- 1998: Comet Award for "Best German act"
