= Take Your Chance =

Single by Fun Factory

from the album NonStop! The Album
- Released: August 6, 1994
- Genre: Eurodance; ragga
- Length: 4:33
- Label: Regular
- Songwriters: Bülent Aris; Rainer Kesselbauer; Toni Cottura; Rodney Hardison
- Producers: Bülent Aris; Tony Cottura

Fun Factory singles chronology
"Close to You" (1994)	"Take Your Chance" (1994)	"Pain" (1994)

Music video
- "Take Your Chance" on YouTube

"Take Your Chance" is a song by German Eurodance band Fun Factory, released in August 1994, by Regular Records, as the fourth single from their debut album, NonStop! The Album (1994). It is written by Bülent Aris, Rainer Kesselbauer, Toni Cottura, and Rodney Hardison, and produced by Aris and Cottura. The song was a top-20 hit in Germany, peaking at number 18 with 14 weeks in total inside the German Singles Chart. In Sweden and Switzerland, it was a top-40 hit and it also reached number five on the Canadian RPM Dance/Urban chart. The accompanying music video was directed by Steve Willis and produced by Czar Films. It was A-listed on German music television channel VIVA in October 1994. Pan-European magazine Music & Media wrote in their review of the single, "In a "1984" doom-type prophecy everybody says the end of Euro is near, and all involved should change their musical course. Here, the adjustments are the presence of rap and ragga rhymes."

== Track listings ==
- CD maxi-single (Europe, 1994)
1. "Take Your Chance" (Take The Airwaves Mix) — 3:56
2. "Take Your Chance" (Take The Original Mix) — 5:45
3. "Take Your Chance" (Take The Tribe Mix) — 5:53
4. "Take Your Chance" (Take The Remix) — 5:38
- CD maxi-single (Remixes), (Germany, 1994)
1. "Take Your Chance" (Take No Mercy Mix) — 7:29
2. "Take Your Chance" (Take The Trance Mix) — 7:29
3. "Freestylin'" (Extensive Version) — 2:42

== Charts ==
=== Weekly charts ===
Chart (1994)	Peak position
Canada Dance/Urban (RPM)	5
Europe (Eurochart Hot 100)	79
Germany (GfK)	18
Sweden (Sverigetopplistan)	35
Switzerland (Schweizer Hitparade)	37
US Billboard Hot 100	88
US Maxi-Singles Sales (Billboard)	39
US Cash Box Top 100	83

=== Year-end charts ===
Chart (1995)	Position
Canada Dance/Urban (RPM)	41
