= Toni Cottura =

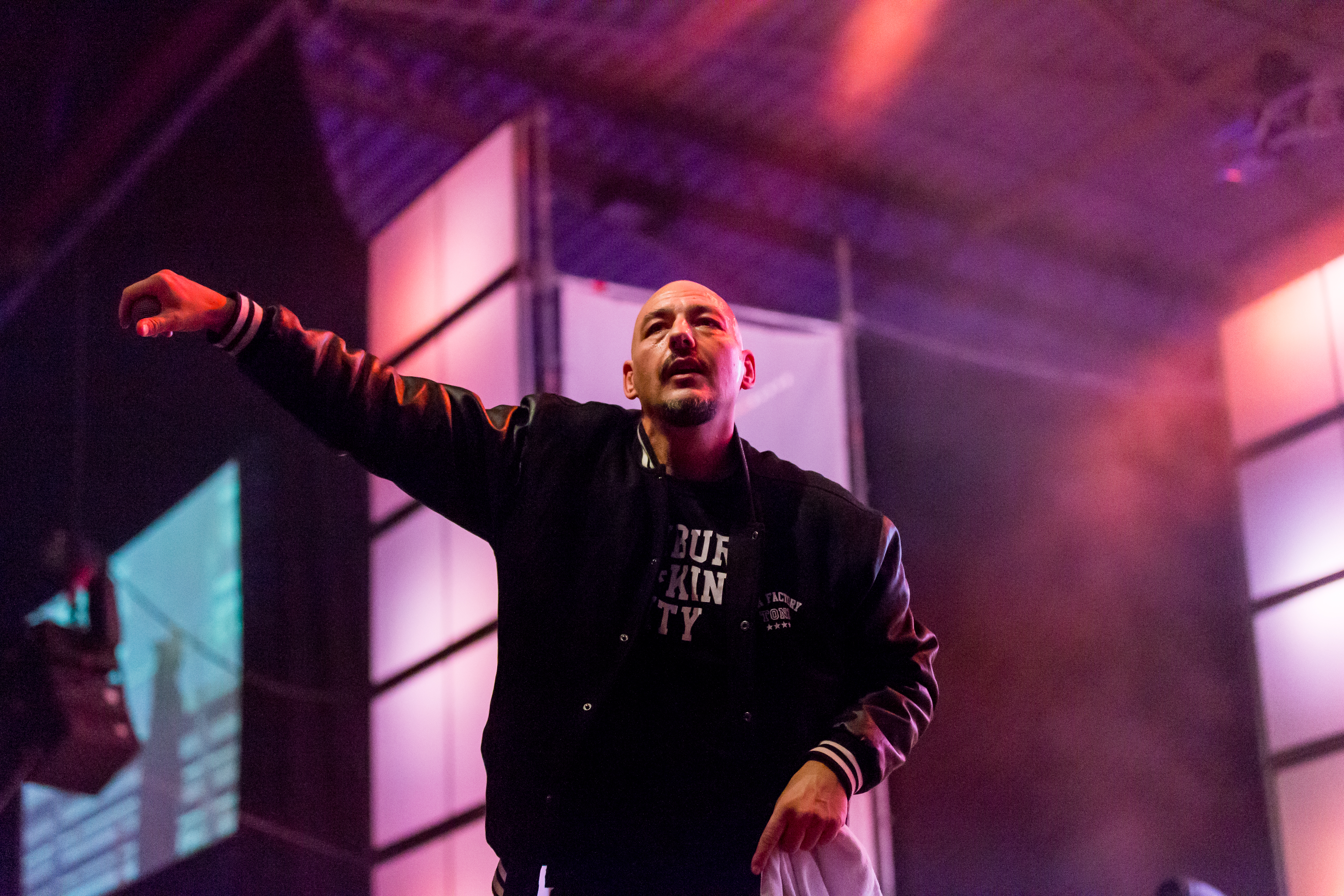

Background information
- Also known as: Smooth T
- Born: 7 June 1971 (age 55)
- Genres: Eurodance, hip hop
- Years active: 1988–present
- Label: Eastwest Records
- Member of: Fun Factory

Toni Cottura (born 7 June 1971), better known by his stage name Smooth T., is an Italian-born German Eurodance and hip hop producer and rapper.

== Musical career ==
He started his career in 1988 as a hip hop producer with David Fascher and later worked with DJ Shahin.

In 1993, he founded the Eurodance group Fun Factory, where he started as a dancer before he went on to be a producer, a songwriter and then moved up to rapping on the band's second album. Fun Factory disbanded in 1996. Cottura and partner Bülent Aris began to concentrate on their hip-hop collective, known as the Booya Family.

While at Booya, he produced tracks for a variety of artists, including Nana (a.k.a. Darkman), Pappa Bear, Ray Horton, Jonestown, A.K. Swift and Alex Prince, mostly in hip hop and R&B. He also produced tracks for boy bands 'N Sync ("Here We Go", "U Drive Me Crazy") and Backstreet Boys ("Get Down") and collaborated with P. Diddy.

In 2000, Cottura parted ways with Aris and disbanded Booya, returning to Eurodance to form The Underdog Project and Popstars winners Bro'Sis. He made a surprise return in 2003 with a pop ballad, "Fly".

In 2002, Cottura produced the track "Bounce" for Sarah Connor's 2002 album "Unbelievable"

In 2006, Cottura returned to the scene with a new single entitled "Quieres Una Aventura", a duet with Romanian singer Corina.
