= Oh! Pleasant Hope =

Studio album by Blue Cheer
- Released: April 1971
- Recorded: 1970–71
- Genre: Psychedelic rock, blues rock, folk rock
- Length: 32:18
- Label: Philips
- Producer: Eric Albronda, Blue Cheer

Blue Cheer chronology
The Original Human Being (1970)	Oh! Pleasant Hope (1971)	The Beast Is Back (1983)

Oh! Pleasant Hope is the sixth album by American rock group Blue Cheer, and their final album until 1984's The Beast Is Back. It features less psychedelia and hard rock and includes more folk rock elements. This is an unusual Blue Cheer album in that Dickie Peterson only sings lead on three songs. Another unusual aspect is that the song "I'm the Light" features extensive use of the sitar and synthesizer, although on the previous album The Original Human Being the song "Babaji (Twilight Raga)" also featured extensive use of the aforementioned instruments.

Professional ratings
Review scores
Source	Rating
Allmusic	3.5/5 stars
Robert Christgau	B+

== Track listing ==
1. "Hiway Man" (Gary R. Grelecki, Norman Mayell, Gary Yoder) – 4:22
2. "Believer" (Gary R. Grelecki, Gary Lee Yoder) – 3:41
3. "Money Troubles" (Dr. Richard Peddicord) – 4:02
4. "Traveling Man" (Gary R. Grelecki, Gary Lee Yoder) – 3:10
5. "Oh! Pleasant Hope" (Dr. Richard Peddicord) – 2:39
6. "I'm the Light" (Kent Housman, Norman Mayell) – 5:39
7. "Ecological Blues" (Norman Mayell) – 2:26
8. "Lester the Arrester" (Ralph Burns Kellogg) – 3:02
9. "Heart Full of Soul" (Dickie Peterson)– 4:37

== Personnel ==
- Dickie Peterson – bass, vocals
- Norman Mayell – drums, guitar, sitar, vocals
- Gary Yoder – acoustic and electric guitars, harp, vocals
- Ralph Burns Kellogg – organ, piano, synthesizer, bass

with:

- Bob Gurland - Mouth Trumpet
- Kent Housman - Dobro, Backing Vocals
- Cynthia Jobse - Harp
- Jim Keylor - Bass
- Douglas Killmer - Bass
- Jack May - Guitar
- Dehner Patten - Guitar
- Dr. Richard Peddicord - Guitar, Vocals
- Ronald Stallings - Saxophone
