= The Original Human Being =

Studio album by Blue Cheer
- Released: September 1970
- Recorded: 1970
- Studio: Mercury Sound Studio West, San Francisco, California
- Genre: Psychedelic rock, blues rock, hard rock, country rock
- Length: 44:30
- Label: Philips
- Producer: Gary Lee Yoder, Eric Albronda, Norman Mayell (track 1)

Blue Cheer chronology
Blue Cheer (1969)	The Original Human Being (1970)	Oh! Pleasant Hope (1971)

Professional ratings
Review scores
Source	Rating
AllMusic	3/5 stars

The Original Human Being is Blue Cheer's fifth album. It was released in 1970 and shows Blue Cheer exploring a more psychedelic and laid‑back rock and roll with horn sections on a few of the songs. This album features a very unusual, and different, song for Blue Cheer: "Babaji (Twilight Raga)", which features extensive use of sitar and synthesizer. These instruments were only used one other time in the song "I'm the Light" on the album Oh! Pleasant Hope.

The Original Human Being peaked at No. 188 on the Billboard Top LPs chart.

== Track listing ==
Side one

1. "Good Times Are So Hard to Find" (Kent Housman, Norman Mayell) – 3:22
2. "Love of a Woman" (Dickie Peterson) – 4:35
3. "Make Me Laugh" (Ralph Burns Kellogg) – 5:06
4. "Pilot" (Gary R. Grelecki, Gary Lee Yoder) – 4:49
5. "Babaji (Twilight Raga)" (Mayell) – 3:46 (instrumental)

Side two

1. "Preacher" (Grelecki, Yoder) – 4:01
2. "Black Sun" (Grelecki, Yoder) – 3:31
3. "Tears in My Bed" (Kellogg) – 2:06
4. "Man on the Run" (Peterson) – 3:58
5. "Sandwich" (Grelecki, Yoder) – 5:01
6. "Rest at Ease" (Grelecki, Yoder) – 5:35

== Personnel ==
Blue Cheer

- Dickie Peterson – bass, guitar, lead vocals (tracks 2, 3, 9)
- Gary Lee Yoder – guitar, harmonica, vocals, harp, lead vocals (tracks 1, 4–8, 10–11), producer
- Ralph Burns Kellogg – organ, piano, synthesizer, bass
- Norman Mayell – drums, guitar, percussion, sitar, producer on track 1

Production

- Eric Albronda – producer
- Mark Harman, George Horn – engineers
- Russ Gary – mixing and editing at Wally Heider Studios, San Francisco, California
