= Just a Little Bit (Blue Cheer song) =

Single by Blue Cheer

from the album Outsideinside
- B-side: "Gypsy Ball"
- Released: August 1968
- Recorded: Gate 5 Studios; Pacific Recorders; A&R Studio; Olmstead Studios
- Genre: Psychedelic rock; heavy metal
- Length: 3:24
- Label: Philips
- Songwriter(s): Dickie Peterson
- Producer(s): Abe "Voco" Kesh

Blue Cheer singles chronology
| "Summertime Blues" (1968) | "Just a Little Bit" (1968) | "Feathers From Your Tree" (1968) |

"Just a Little Bit" is a song by American rock band Blue Cheer featured on the album Outsideinside. It is one of two Blue Cheer songs to chart on the Billboard Hot 100, peaking at number 92, and number 69 in Canada. The band did a remake of the song for their album What Doesn't Kill You... Drummer Neil Peart of Rush later used one of the drum patterns from the song for the ending of their cover of "Summertime Blues".

== Personnel ==
- Dickie Peterson – bass, lead vocals
- Leigh Stephens – guitar
- Paul Whaley – drums

== Charts ==
| Chart (1972) | Peak position |
|---|---|
| Canada Top Singles (Canadian Hot 100) | 69 |
| US Top Singles (Billboard Hot 100) | 92 |
