= Blue Cheer (album) =

Studio album by Blue Cheer
- Released: December 1969
- Recorded: 1969
- Studio: Wally Heider Studios, San Francisco, California
- Genre: Psychedelic rock, hard rock
- Length: 36:15
- Label: Philips
- Producer: Michael Sunday, Eric Albronda

Blue Cheer chronology
New! Improved! (1969)	Blue Cheer (1969)	The Original Human Being (1970)

Blue Cheer is the fourth album by American rock band Blue Cheer. It was recorded at Wally Heider Studios in San Francisco and released in December 1969 by Philips Records. Gary Lee Yoder contributed songwriting for the opening and closing tracks and would later join the group as guitarist on their next album The Original Human Being.

== Release and reception ==
Professional ratings
Review scores
Source	Rating
AllMusic	3.5/5 stars
Robert Christgau	B

According to Lillian Roxon's Rock Encyclopedia, the album was released in December 1969. Reviewing for The Village Voice the following June, Robert Christgau gave the album a "B" grade and wrote: "There ought to be hundreds of groups like this one—hard, competent, slightly commercial—but there probably aren't more than 20. This is not especially original, but it's good, and I'll bet they're a stone happy gas live." AllMusic's Mark Deming later gave it three-and-a-half out of five stars and appraised it in comparison to the band's harder previous records, calling it "a fun album that generates an impressive groove ... a more laid-back and relaxed effort, but it still rocks with a strong and steady roll."

== Track listing ==
Side one

1. "Fool" (Gary R. Grelecki, Gary Lee Yoder) – 3:26
2. "You're Gonna Need Someone" (Norman Mayell, Bruce Stephens) – 3:31
3. "Hello LA, Bye Bye Birmingham" (Delaney Bramlett, Mac Davis) – 3:29
4. "Saturday Freedom" (Stephens) – 5:47
5. "Ain't That the Way (Love's Supposed to Be)" (Ralph Burns Kellogg, Dickie Peterson) – 3:11

Side two

1. "Rock and Roll Queens" (Kellogg, Peterson) – 2:44
2. "Better When We Try" (Kellogg) – 2:48
3. "Natural Man" (Kellogg, Peterson) – 3:36
4. "Lovin' You's Easy" (Stephens) – 3:50
5. "The Same Old Story" (Grelecki, Yoder) – 3:53

The 2007 Japanese mini-LP sleeve reissue of Blue Cheer contains the mono non-LP single "All Night Long" (Kellogg) b/w "Fortunes" (Peterson) along with the single versions of "Fool" and "Ain't That the Way" as bonus tracks.

== Personnel ==
Blue Cheer

- Bruce Stephens – guitar, backing and lead (2, 4, 7, 9) vocals
- Dickie Peterson – bass, lead vocals (1, 3, 5, 6, 8, 10)
- Ralph Burns Kellogg – keyboards
- Norman Mayell – drums

Production

- Michael Sunday – producer
- Eric Albronda – assistant producer, backing vocals
- John Craig – cover design
- Russ Gary – engineering
- Richard Germinaro – liner note art
- Baron Wolman – photography
