= New! Improved! =

1969 album by Blue Cheer

Studio album by Blue Cheer
- Released: March 1969
- Recorded: 1969
- Studio: Amigo, North Hollywood, California
- Genre: Hard rock; psychedelic rock; blues rock
- Length: 31:25
- Label: Philips
- Producer: Milan Melvin

Blue Cheer chronology
Outsideinside (1968)	New! Improved! (1969)	Blue Cheer (1969)

New! Improved! is the third album by American rock group Blue Cheer. Released in March 1969 by Philips Records, it is their first without original guitarist Leigh Stephens. The album features songs recorded by two different group lineups: in addition to bassist and vocalist Dickie Peterson and drummer Paul Whaley, side one includes Bruce Stephens (no relation to Leigh) on guitar and Burns Kellogg on keyboards; while side two includes Randy Holden on guitar and vocals.

The two lineups contribute very different material. With Holden, the approach is closer to the previous psychedelic hard rock of Blue Cheer albums; with Kellogg and Peterson, they explore more understated blues rock and country rock styles. Also, unlike their earlier albums, Peterson plays a smaller role. Holden wrote and sings the songs on side two, while Kellogg and Stephens contribute most of the material on side one.

New! Improved! was slightly more successful than the group's previous album, Outsideinside, and reached number 84 on the Billboard 200 album chart. One single "West Coast Child of Sunshine", backed with "When It All Gets Old", was released, but did not reach the charts. The album has been reissued several times and a 1994 release by Repertoire Records includes two songs first released in 1969 on a non-album single. The Holden compositions "Peace of Mind" and "Fruit & Icebergs" appear on several Blue Cheer compilations, such as Louder Than God: The Best of Blue Cheer (1986) and The History of Blue Cheer – Good Times Are So Hard to Find (1988).

== Critical reception ==
Professional ratings
Review scores
Source	Rating
AllMusic	3.5/5 stars
Collector's Guide to Heavy Metal	7/10

In a retrospective review for AllMusic, Mark Deming gave the album three and a half out of five stars. He emphasizes the two very different musical styles: terms such as "rootsy", "country rock", and "percussive boogie" are used to describe the songs with Kellogg and Stephens, while Holden's "contributions feel a lot more like the group's formative work [and] suggest an evolution from the towering proto-metal of Vincebus Eruptum and Outsideinside".

== Track listing ==
Album details taken from the original Philips album liner notes and may differ from other sources.

Side one
No.	Title	Writer(s)	Length
1.	"When It All Gets Old"	Burns Kellogg	2:51
2.	"West Coast Child of Sunshine"	Bruce Stephens	2:35
3.	"I Want My Baby Back"	Stephens	3:12
4.	"Aces 'n' Eights"	Kellogg, Dickie Peterson, Stephens	2:43
5.	"As Long as I Live"	Peterson, Stephens	2:18
6.	"It Takes a Lot to Laugh, It Takes a Train to Cry"	Bob Dylan	3:13

Side two
No.	Title	Writer(s)	Length
1.	"Peace of Mind"	Randy Holden	7:17
2.	"Fruit & Icebergs"	Holden	6:05
3.	"Honey Butter Lover"	Holden	1:21

Bonus tracks on 1994 Repertoire re-issue
No.	Title	Writer(s)	Length
1.	"All Night Long"	Kellogg	2:06
2.	"Fortunes"	Peterson	2:20

== Personnel ==
Side One

- Dickie Peterson – bass, 12-string guitar, vibraslap, vocals
- Paul Whaley – drums, percussion
- Bruce Stephens – guitar, tortoise shell, woodblocks
- Burns Kellogg – piano, organ
- Gene Estes – "percussion stuff"

Side Two

- Randy Holden – guitar, vocals
- Dickie Peterson – bass
- Paul Whaley – drums

Production

- Milan Melvin – producer
- Hank Cicalo – engineer, mixing
- Greg Irons – cover art and lettering
