= The Savage Resurrection =

American psychedelic rock band

- Origin: Richmond, California, United States
- Genres: Psychedelic rock, acid rock, garage rock
- Years active: 1967–1968, 2007–present
- Label: Mercury
- Past members: Bill Harper; Randy Hammon; John Palmer (deceased); Steve Lage (deceased); Jeff Myer (deceased)

The Savage Resurrection was an American psychedelic rock band from the San Francisco Bay area, and were active in between 1967 and 1968. The band was known as one of the youngest psychedelic rock bands in the area, with their 16-year-old lead guitarist, Randy Hammon, who is the cousin of Blue Cheer drummer Paul Whaley. There was only one member of the band who was not a teenager, and that was Steve Lage, who was 21.

== History ==
Founded in 1967, the group was signed to Mercury Records, on which they released their eponymous debut in 1968. Their album was produced by Abe "Voco" Kesh who is famous with his work with the band Blue Cheer and Harvey Mandel. Their sound was close to groups such as Love and the Jimi Hendrix Experience. Singer Bill Harper and bassist Steve Lage quit the band shortly thereafter, leading to the demise of the group. The band continued on touring until late 1968 and then disbanded.

Nick Saloman of The Bevis Frond has cited the Savage Resurrection as one of his biggest influences and, in October 2008, performed a live set with guitarist Randy Hammon. There was some suspicion that Randy Hammon was actually Randy Holden due to some citing that was done in Joe Carducci's book, The Pop Narcotic; this seems to be a misconception.

=== Post 1968 ===
Bill Harper went on to write and perform, notably appearing on an LP and several singles with The Stepford Husbands in the early 1980s. Jeff Myer recorded and toured extensively throughout the 1970s and 1980s with Van Morrison, Jesse Colin Young, Janis Ian, Tom Fogerty, Terry and The Pirates (with Terry Dolan, John Cipollina, and Greg Douglass), and reggae band The Edge (with the Rowan brothers). Former band member Steve Lage, who was born Stephen Allen Lage on August 15, 1947, died on July 25, 2010, in Oakland, California.

=== Present day ===
A version of The Savage Resurrection has been performing since 2007. It featured original members Bill Harper, Randy Hammon and Jeff Myer, although Jeff left sometime during 2019.

The group was joined by John Hansen on bass, Greg Langston on drums, and Cliff Moser on guitar.

== Band members ==
- Bill Harper – lead vocals
- Randy Hammon – lead guitar
- John Palmer – guitar
- Steve Lage – bass
- Jeff Myer – drums

== Discography ==
Singles

- "Thing in E" b/w "Fox Is Sick" (Mercury 72778) 1968
- "Thing in E" b/w "Fox Is Sick" [Reissue] (Mercury 72778 1-35789) 1968

Albums

- The Savage Resurrection (Mercury MG-21156 (mono)/SR-61156 (stereo)) 1968
