= Blitzkrieg Over Nüremberg =

Live album by Blue Cheer
- Released: 1989
- Genre: Hard rock, heavy metal
- Label: Magnum Records

Blue Cheer chronology
| The Beast Is Back (1984) | Blitzkrieg Over Nüremberg (1989) | Highlights and Lowlives (1990) |

Professional ratings
Review scores
| Source | Rating |
|---|---|
| Allmusic | 3/5 stars |

Blitzkrieg Over Nüremberg is the first live album by American blues-rock band Blue Cheer. It features a cover of Jimi Hendrix's "Red House".

== Track listing ==
1. "Babylon" (Dickie Peterson)/"Girl Next Door" (Tony Rainier) – 9:20
2. "Ride with Me" (Tony Rainier) – 8:50
3. "Just a Little Bit" (Dickie Peterson) – 4:27
4. "Summertime Blues" (Jerry Capehart, Eddie Cochran) – 6:39
5. "Out of Focus" (Dickie Peterson) – 4:36
6. "Doctor Please" (Dickie Peterson) – 12:05
7. "The Hunter" (Booker T. Jones) – 6:37
8. "Red House" (Jimi Hendrix) – 8:47

== Personnel ==
- Dickie Peterson – bass guitar, vocals
- Duck MacDonald – lead guitar, vocals
- Dave Salce – drums
