= What Doesn't Kill You... (Blue Cheer album) =

Studio album by Blue Cheer
- Released: August 21, 2007
- Genre: Heavy metal, blues rock, stoner rock
- Length: 55:30
- Label: Rainman

Blue Cheer chronology
Dining with the Sharks (1991)	What Doesn't Kill You... (2007)

Professional ratings
Review scores
Source	Rating
Allmusic	3/5 stars

What Doesn't Kill You... is the tenth and final studio album recorded by American rock band Blue Cheer. It includes a remake of their song "Just a Little Bit" originally from their album Outsideinside and a cover of the classic blues song "Born Under a Bad Sign." David Fricke has called the album "a strong studio calling card." The album features Pentagram drummer Joe Hasselvander on half of the album's tracks while the other half features original drummer, Paul Whaley. The title alludes to Nietzsche's aphorism "What does not kill me makes me stronger".

== Track listing ==
1. "Rollin' Dem Bones" (MacDonald, Peterson) – 4:49
2. "Piece o' the Pie" (MacDonald, Peterson) – 5:06
3. "Born Under a Bad Sign" (William Bell, Booker T. Jones) – 3:38
4. "Gypsy Rider" (MacDonald, Peterson) – 4:54
5. "Young Lions in Paradise" (Dickie Peterson) – 6:49
6. "I Don't Know About You" (MacDonald, Peterson) – 5:00
7. "I'm Gonna Get to You" (MacDonald, Peterson) – 6:32
8. "Maladjusted Child" (MacDonald, Peterson) – 5:08
9. "Just a Little Bit (Redux)" (Dickie Peterson) – 4:01
10. "No Relief" (MacDonald, Peterson) – 9:31

== Personnel ==
- Dickie Peterson – bass guitar, vocals
- Duck MacDonald – guitar
- Paul Whaley – drums (tracks: 3, 6–9)
- Joe Hasselvander – drums (tracks: 1, 2, 4, 5, 10)
