= Dehner =

Dehner is a surname. Notable people with the surname include:

- Dorothy Dehner (1901–1994), American painter and sculptor
- Durk Dehner, Canadian businessman, film director and publisher
- Ernst Dehner (1889–1970), Nazi German Wehrmacht general
- Jeremy Dehner (born 1987), American ice hockey player
- John Dehner (1915–1992), American actor
- Michelle Dehner (died 1990), possible victim of the Frankford Slasher
- Pick Dehner (1914–1987), American basketball player and coach

== See also ==
- Dehner Company, a footwear manufacturer based in Omaha, Nebraska
- Dehner Patten, lead guitarist of The Oxford Circle and Kak
- Dr. Elisabeth Dehner, a character in Where No Man Has Gone Before, a Star Trek episode
- Jason and Justin Dehner, characters in Dynasty (1981 TV series)
