= The Beast Is Back =

Studio album by Blue Cheer
- Released: 1984
- Recorded: Music America Studios, Rochester, New York, 1984
- Genre: Heavy metal, blues rock, hard rock
- Length: 37:14
- Label: Megaforce
- Producer: Carl Canedy, Paul Curcio, Jon Zazula

Blue Cheer chronology
Oh! Pleasant Hope (1971)	The Beast Is Back (1984)	Highlights and Lowlives (1990)

The Beast Is Back: The Megaforce Years CD cover

Professional ratings
Review scores
Source	Rating
Kerrang!	3.5/5 stars

The Beast Is Back is the seventh album by a newly reformed Blue Cheer, 13 years after their previous album, Oh! Pleasant Hope (1971). It contains re-recorded versions of some of the band's most popular songs from their late-1960s heyday as well as new material. The album features founding members Dickie Peterson and Paul Whaley. Original guitarist Leigh Stephens did not participate in the reunion.

The Beast Is Back has been released with three different album covers.

== Track listing ==
Side one

1. "Nightmares" (Dickie Peterson) – 5:03
2. "Summertime Blues" (Jerry Capehart, Eddie Cochran) – 3:57
3. "Ride with Me" (Tony Rainier) – 5:25
4. "Girl Next Door" (Rainier) – 3:39

Side two

5. "Babylon" (Peterson) – 4:12
6. "Heart of the City" (Dr. Richard Peddicord) – 4:19
7. "Out of Focus" (Peterson) – 3:43
8. "Parchment Farm" (Mose Allison) – 6:55

== Personnel ==
Band members

- Dickie Peterson – bass, lead vocals
- Tony Rainier – lead guitars, backing vocals
- Paul Whaley – drums

Production

- Carl Canedy, Paul Curcio - producers
- Chris Bubacz - engineer
- Jack Skinner - Mastering
- Jon Zazula - executive producer
