= Guitar God =

Studio album by Randy Holden
- Released: 1997
- Recorded: 1993
- Genre: Rock
- Label: Captain Trip Records

Randy Holden chronology
| Population II (1970) | Guitar God (1997) | Guitar God 2001 (2001) |

Guitar God is the first album recorded by Randy Holden, after a hiatus from music for two decades. The last album he recorded, prior to his departure from the music world, was Population II, in 1970. The Population II album became a much sought after, difficult to find collector's album, with prices upward of $900 being paid to get one.

Guitar God was recorded in 1993 in a limited release by the artist in 1997 through Captain Trip Records, a Japan-only label. Holden recorded with his former Blue Cheer bandmate, drummer Paul Whaley. Prior to recording Guitar God, Holden and Whaley had not seen or spoken to each other for over two decades.

Guitar God received excellent reviews.

== Track listing ==
1. Dark Eyes (Part I)
2. Wild Fire
3. Scarlet Rose
4. Pain in My Heart
5. Hell and High Water
6. No Trace
7. Got Love
8. Blue My Mind
9. Castle in the Sky
10. Dark Eyes (Part II)

== Personnel ==
- Randy Holden - guitar, vocals
- Robert Bauer - Bass
- Paul Whaley - Drums
- Rachel Stavach - Vocals on "Hell and High Water" / "Pain in My Heart"
