= Guitar God 2001 =

Studio album by Randy Holden
- Released: 2001
- Genre: Rock

Randy Holden chronology
Guitar God (1997)	Guitar God 2001 (2001)	Surf Guitar God 1963/2001 (2007)

Guitar God 2001 is an album by Randy Holden (formerly of The Sons of Adam) guitarist, as the follow-up to a previous album Guitar God released in 1997. The newer Guitar God 2001 featured a 22-minute instrumental titled "Prayer to Paradise" in celebration of the new millennium, whose musical content was a rock guitar styled journey through time and cultures of music of the world, as a musical statement of the journey of man to the destiny of his endless quest to reach paradise. Originally titled "Parade to Paradise", the title was changed to move more toward the poetic sense of the music. This was the second album recorded and released by Randy Holden after a hiatus from music.

== Track listing ==
1. "Space Surf Rider"
2. "Sail on Love"
3. "Prayer to Paradise"
4. "I'll Take Your Blues Away"

== Reviews ==
The Guitar God 2001 album received an excellent review from MusicDish.

== Personnel ==
- Randy Holden - guitar, vocals
- Randy Pratt - Bass
- Darren Lyons - Drums
- Phil Weiss - Drums on "Sail On Love"
- Rachel Stavach - Vocals on "I'll Take Your Blues Away"
