= Dining with the Sharks =

Dining With the Sharks

Studio album by Blue Cheer
- Released: 1991
- Studio: Foel Studio, Llanfair Caereinion, Powys, Wales
- Genre: Blues rock, heavy metal, stoner rock
- Length: 47:43
- Label: Nibelung
- Producer: Roland Hofmann and Blue Cheer

Blue Cheer chronology
Highlights and Lowlives (1990)	Dining With the Sharks (1991)	What Doesn't Kill You... (2007)

Professional ratings
Review scores
Source	Rating
AllMusic	2/5 stars
Collector's Guide to Heavy Metal	6/10

Dining With the Sharks is the ninth studio album by American rock band Blue Cheer. It features a cover of Jimi Hendrix's classic "Foxy Lady".

== Track listing ==
1. "Big Noise" (Bruce Stephens, John Rewind, Dickie Peterson) – 4:51
2. "Outrider" (Peterson) – 6:19
3. "Sweet Child of Reeperbahn" (Peterson, Dieter Saller) – 4:12
4. "Gunfight" (Peterson, Saller) – 6:53
5. "Audio Whore" (Peterson) – 3:53
6. "Cut the Costs" (Peterson, Saller) – 3:41
7. "Sex Soldier" (Peterson, Saller) – 5:05
8. "When Two Spirits Touch" (Peterson) – 3:52
9. "Pull the Trigger" (Saller) – 5:20
10. "Foxy Lady" (Jimi Hendrix) – 3:51

== Personnel ==
Blue Cheer

- Dickie Peterson – bass, vocals, guitar
- Paul Whaley – drums, percussion
- Dieter Saller – guitars, percussion

Additional musicians

- Tony McPhee – slide guitar on track 8
- Dave Anderson, Mick Jones, Harry Love, Roland Hofmann – handclaps and good vibes

Production

- Roland Hofmann – producer
- Harry Love, Dave Anderson – engineers
- Hardy Heinlin – mixing
- Hans-Jörg Mauksch – mastering
