= Geoff Westen =

American songwriter

- Genres: Rock, Instrumental, Ambient
- Occupations: Musician, Songwriter, Vocalist, Performer, Graphic Designer
- Instruments: Guitar, Bass, Keyboards, Programming

Geoff Westen is an American musician, songwriter, artist, producer and graphic designer. He was a member of the seminal San Francisco rock group The Other Half with guitarist Randy Holden, and was subsequently a founding member of Epic Records' recording group C.K. Strong with lead singer Lynn Carey. Recording as The Balls in London, he released the single "I Love The Balls" on Towerbell Records, and the follow-up release "I Never Dress Right" under the name The Scoop.

As a graphic designer, Westen designed the album cover for Steely Dan's album, Aja. As a songwriter he co-wrote "Lovin' You," a solo single for Shocking Blue singer, Mariska Veres and "Leather Boots" recorded by Alice Cooper on the album Flush the Fashion. The album was distributed by Warner Bros. Records in 1980 and re-released on Rhino Records in 2011.

Since 2002, he has released seven albums on Disturbing Music. The pop albums, The Pigs Oink! was named by indie-music.com as one of the "Top Indie Albums of 2006, Vidiots Tune In! was released in 2008 and I'm Not Crazy in 2015. His rock/ambient instrumental albums are Xmas Vol. 1 in 2003, Birth in 2004 and Activate in 2011.

== Discography ==
=== Performer ===
- The Other Half GNP/Crescendo Records – 1966
- C.K. Strong Epic Records - 1969
- The Balls/The Scoop Towerbell Records - 1981

== Albums ==
- Digital Activity Xmas Vol. 1 Disturbing Music – 2003
- Digital Activity Birth Disturbing Music - 2004
- The Pigs Oink! Disturbing Music - 2006
- Vidiots Tune In Disturbing Music - 2008
- Activate Disturbing Music - 2011
- I'm Not Crazy Disturbing Music - 2015
- Random Acts of Music Disturbing Music - 2021

=== Songwriter ===
- Mariska Veres - "Lovin' You" - 1976
- Alice Cooper – "Leather Boots" - 1980
