= Vincebus Eruptum =

Studio album by Blue Cheer
- Released: January 16, 1968
- Recorded: 1967
- Studios: Amigo (Los Angeles, California)
- Genres: Hard rock; blues rock; psychedelic rock; acid rock; heavy metal
- Length: 32:08
- Label: Philips
- Producer: Abe "Voco" Kesh

Blue Cheer chronology
Vincebus Eruptum (1968)	Outsideinside (1968)

Singles from Vincebus Eruptum
- 1. "Summertime Blues" Released: January 23, 1968

Vincebus Eruptum (/vɪŋˈkeɪbəs ɪˈrʌptəm/; pseudo-Latin) is the debut album of American rock band Blue Cheer. Released on January 16, 1968, the album features a heavy-thunderous blues sound, which would later be known as heavy metal.

A commercial and critical success, Vincebus Eruptum peaked at number 11 on the Billboard 200 albums chart and spawned the number 14 hit cover of Eddie Cochran's "Summertime Blues". Being an example of hard rock, it is also lauded as one of the first heavy metal albums. Spin magazine placed it at number 22 on their list of the 40 greatest metal albums, declaring the album, "Proto-metal, but also the birthplace of grunge."

== Background and history ==
Blue Cheer's debut album was recorded in 1967 at Amigo Studios in North Hollywood, California. In an interview, frontman Dickie Peterson explained that "Some songs I wrote have taken 20 years to really complete. And there are other songs like 'Doctor Please' or 'Out of Focus' that I wrote in ten minutes."

On "Doctor Please" in particular, Peterson explained that "when I wrote the song (in 1967), it was a glorification of drugs. I was going through a lot of 'Should I take this drug or should I not take this drug? Blah, blah, blah.' There was a lot of soul searching at the time when I wrote that song, and I actually decided to take it. That’s what that song was about and that’s what I sang it about, sort of a drug anthem for me." On the band's cover of Eddie Cochran's "Summertime Blues", Peterson noted that "We kept changing it around and adding/taking bits away. It also has to do with large doses of LSD."

== Music ==
"As Black Sabbath began to pick up the pace in the UK, San Francisco’s Blue Cheer were offering an alternative view of heaviness. This was based on a bad acid trip in a war zone. Which was appropriate, as legend has it that many US soldiers went into battle during the Vietnam war with this album blasting out. The trio's distortion-obsessed cover of the Eddie Cochran hit 'Summertime Blues' has become emblematic of the era, while 'Parchment Farm' and 'Doctor Please' were more doomy than even Sabbath."

== Reception and legacy ==
Professional ratings
Review scores
Source	Rating
AllMusic	4.5/5 stars
Collector's Guide to Heavy Metal	6/10
Pitchfork	9.0/10
Rolling Stone	(negative)

The album has widely been held in high regard by critics. Writing for music website AllMusic, Mark Deming described Vincebus Eruptum as "a glorious celebration of rock & roll primitivism run through enough Marshall amps to deafen an army", praising the band's "sound and fury" as one of the founding movements of heavy metal. Pitchfork reviewer Alexander Linhardt gave the album nine out of ten points, noting that the album was less structured than its successor, Outsideinside. It has been described by Billboard as "the epitome of psychedelic rock", while VH1 called it an "acid rock masterwork". Martin Popoff was less enthusiastic in his review and called the music "derivative" and "equating closer to acid-washed loud and slurring renditions of '60s rock" than heavy metal, judging the album "a howling mess."

Online music service Rhapsody included Vincebus Eruptum in its list of the "10 Essential Proto-Metal Albums", suggesting that the band "not only inspired the term 'power trio,' they practically invented heavy metal." In 1998, The Wire included Vincebus Eruptum in their list of "100 Records That Set the World on Fire (While No One Was Listening)", calling it a "seminal" album that "snarled rabidly in the face of hippy innocence and soon became a Hells Angels party stomper." They also note the strong influence the album had on 1990s Japanese noise trios such as High Rise and Musica Transonic.

Classic Rock Magazine wrote in 2021: "This album is a highly charged, deranged masterpiece that still sounds remarkably contemporary."

== Track listing ==
Side one
No.	Title	Writer(s)	Length
1.	"Summertime Blues"	Eddie Cochran, Jerry Capehart	3:47
2.	"Rock Me Baby"	B.B. King, Joe Josea	4:22
3.	"Doctor Please"	Dickie Peterson	7:53

Side two
No.	Title	Writer(s)	Length
4.	"Out of Focus"	Peterson	3:58
5.	"Parchment Farm"	Mose Allison	5:49
6.	"Second Time Around"	Peterson	6:17
Total length:			31:54

2003 remastered reissue
No.	Title	Writer(s)	Length
7.	"All Night Long"	Ralph Burns Kellogg	2:06
Total length:			34:00

== Personnel ==
Blue Cheer

- Dickie Peterson – vocals, bass
- Leigh Stephens – guitar
- Paul Whaley – drums

Additional personnel

- Abe "Voco" Kesh – production
- John MacQuarrie – engineering
- John Van Hamersveld – photography

Remastered version

- Bill Levenson – production
- Ellen Fitton – remastering
