= The New Penelope =

Montreal concert venue from the 1960s

Coordinates: 45°30′28″N 73°34′17″W

The New Penelope was a coffeehouse and concert venue that operated in Montreal, Canada from 1966 to 1968. The café was a popular hangout spot for youth in Montreal's Milton Park area. Despite its short run, it was an integral venue for live folk, rock, blues, and jazz, in Montreal and featured musicians and bands like The Mothers of Invention, The Fugs, Joni Mitchell, Jesse Winchester, Muddy Waters, and other notable names before they were international headliners.

== History ==
Originally located on Stanley St., the New Penelope moved to Sherbrooke St. West in 1967. Owned by musician Gary Eisenkraft, who started learning business at age 17 in 1964, he took over The Fifth Dimension coffeehouse at 1455 Bleury St. and subsequently renamed it The Fifth Amendment. The Reverend Gary Davis, The Greenbriar Boys, Eric Andersen, and John Hammond were among the folk, blues, and bluegrass acts who performed at this venue. At the time, there were few, if any, other venues where people could see these kinds of American performers, and it quickly became a popular hangout spot among students and young people.

Unfortunately, the Fifth Amendment closed in the spring of 1965. That summer, Eisenkraft opened a new coffeehouse called The Penelope on Bishop St. The Penelope lasted only five months but was followed shortly after by The New Penelope, a larger coffeehouse and concert venue that operated at 1432 Stanley from spring to December 1966.

While the Penelope and the Fifth Amendment had primarily presented acoustic blues, folk and bluegrass acts, the New Penelope on Stanley St. hosted concerts by rock and roll and electric blues bands. Among those who performed there were the Paul Butterfield Blues Band, Canadian folk-pop acts Ian and Sylvia and Gordon Lightfoot, as well as local rock bands like The Sidetrack and The Cavemen.

By the winter of 1967, Eisenkraft had moved The New Penelope to 378 Sherbrooke St. W. and hired the young artist Francois Dallegret for its interior design. The minimalist layout consisted of bleacher-type seating with long wooden planks arranged over metal pipe scaffolding.

The first band to perform at the new venue was the emerging Frank Zappa and The Mothers of Invention, who played there every night for two weeks. This appearance was notable since the band's very first album, Freak Out!, had been just released that summer, and was not yet well-known.

The New Penelope's Sherbrooke St. location had a capacity of over 200 people, albeit not every concert saw such turnout. The first appearance of Joni Mitchell at the café in 1967 was sparsely attended, but by the spring of 1968, Mitchell was returning to host several shows there.

Mitchell was not the only singer-songwriter of the "folk-rock" style to play the New Penelope around that time. Tim Hardin, Tim Buckley and Richie Havens also gave concerts and singer-songwriter Jesse Winchester played there regularly.

Among the blues performers who played at the New Penelope in 1967 and 1968 were Muddy Waters, Junior Wells, James Cotton, and Sonny Terry and Brownie McGhee. Notable rock groups that also played there include The Linn County Blues Band, The Fugs, and The Young Ones.

The New Penelope found itself in financial difficulty by the summer of 1968. Despite various fundraising efforts and benefit concerts, it closed its doors for good in November, 1968.
