= Proud Flesh Soothseer =

Studio album by Linn County
- Released: September 1968
- Recorded: 1968 at Amigo & Annex Studios, Los Angeles
- Genre: Psychedelic rock, blues rock, acid rock, progressive rock, jazz rock
- Length: 39:25
- Label: Mercury Records
- Producer: John Cabalka & Abe Kesh

Linn County chronology
Proud Flesh Soothseer (1968)	Fever Shot (1969)

Professional ratings
Review scores
Source	Rating
Rolling Stone	(neutral)

Proud Flesh Soothseer is a 1968 album by Linn County. The album predominantly features lengthy blues rock and psychedelic rock jams typical of its era. It barely sold and didn't chart. Cave Song was co-written by the band's previous bassist Bob Miskimen, despite him not being featured on the album.

In October 2011, the album was given its first reissue on CD, and remains the only album by Linn County that is currently in print.

== Track listing ==
Side 1

1. "Think" (L. Pauling) - 3:31
2. "Lower Lemons" (S. Miller, L. Easter, F. Walk) - 4:06
3. "Moon Food" (S. Miller, L. Easter, F. Walk, D. Long) - 6:30
4. "Cave Song" (S. Miller, B. Miskimen) - 4:28

Side 2

1. "Protect & Serve/Bad Things" (S. Miller, L. Easter, F. Walk) - 14:12
2. "Fast Days" (S. Miller, F. Walk) - 6:44

== Personnel ==
- Stephen Miller: Organ, Vocals
- Fred Walk: Guitar, Electric Sitar
- Dino Long: Bass guitar
- Larry Easter: Tenor Saxophone, Soprano Saxophone, Flute
- Jerry 'Snake' McAndrew: Percussion

== Production ==
- Produced by John Cabalka and Abe Kesh
- Engineered by Hank Cicalo
- Arrangements by Shorty Rodgers
