= Outsideinside =

Studio album by Blue Cheer
- Released: August 1968
- Recorded: California & New York, 1968
- Genre: Hard rock; psychedelic rock; acid rock; heavy metal
- Length: 32:44
- Label: Philips
- Producer: Abe "Voco" Kesh

Blue Cheer chronology
Vincebus Eruptum (1968)	Outsideinside (1968)	New! Improved! (1969)

Singles from Outsideinside
- 1. "Just a Little Bit" Released: August 1968

Outsideinside is the second album by American rock trio Blue Cheer. Philips Records released the album in August 1968, only seven months after their debut LP, Vincebus Eruptum.

The album was recorded both outdoors and indoors—hence the title of the album. The songs include contributions from all members, along with two covers: "Satisfaction" by the Rolling Stones and "The Hunter" by Albert King.

Outsideinside reached number 90 on the Billboard 200 album chart. "Just a Little Bit" was the first single from the album; it peaked at number 92 on the Billboard Hot 100 singles chart.

== Critical reception ==
Professional ratings
Review scores
Source	Rating
AllMusic	4/5 stars
Collector's Guide to Heavy Metal	8/10
Pitchfork	9.6/10

In a retrospective review for AllMusic, Mark Deming commented:

[Outsideinside] captures the psychedelic side of their musical personality with greater clarity than the blunt approach of the debut; Outsideinside doesn't sound trippy so much as righteously buzzed, and the speedy roar of this the music is big enough that the legend that parts of this were so loud they had to be recorded outside seems not just plausible, but perfectly reasonable.

In a review of the two-for-one reissue of the album (coupled with Vincebus Eruptum), Pitchfork's Alexander Lloyd Linhardt noted, "Outsideinside converts their [Blue Cheer's] stylistic enthusiasm and leathery attitude into structured song. If it doesn't sound as influential as Vincebus's cataclysmic insanity, it's because it defines 'classic' rock." Canadian journalist Martin Popoff praised the album where the band "pre-dispose of Purple, thwack the face of Hendrix, and generally pound psychedelia into the dirt" and concluded that "by most definitions this ain't heavy metal, but by most measures Blue Cheer stomp over Zep I and II".

== Track listing ==
Details taken from the original Philips LP liner notes; other releases may show different information.

Side one
No.	Title	Writer	Length
1.	"Feathers from Your Tree"	Dickie Peterson, Leigh Stephens, Peter Wagner	3:29
2.	"Sun Cycle"	Peterson, Stephens, Wagner	4:12
3.	"Just a Little Bit"	Peterson	3:24
4.	"Gypsy Ball"	Peterson, Stephens	2:57
5.	"Come and Get It"	Peterson, Stephens, Wagner	3:13

Side two
No.	Title	Writer	Length
1.	"Satisfaction"	Jagger/Richards	5:07
2.	"The Hunter"	Booker T. Jones, Carl Wells, Al Jackson, Jr., Donald Dunn, Steve Cropper	4:22
3.	"Magnolia Caboose Babyfinger"	Peterson, Stephens	1:38
4.	"Babylon"	Peterson	4:22
Total length:			32:44

Bonus track (Akarma CD version 2003)
No.	Title	Writer	Length
1.	"Fortunes"	Peterson	2:20

== Recording locations ==
"Outside sessions"

- Gate Five, Sausalito, California
- Muir Beach, California
- Pier 57, New York City

"Inside sessions"

- A&R Studio, New York City
- Olmstead Studios, New York City
- Record Plant, New York City
- Pacific Recorders, San Mateo, California

== Personnel ==
Blue Cheer

- Leigh Stephens – guitar; backing vocals on "Feathers From Your Tree"
- Dickie Peterson – bass, lead vocals; backing vocals on "Feathers From Your Tree", "(I Can't Get No) Satisfaction" and "The Hunter"
- Paul Whaley – drums; backing vocals on "Feathers From Your Tree", "(I Can't Get No) Satisfaction" and "The Hunter"

Additional musicians

- Eric Albronda – backing vocals on "(I Can't Get No) Satisfaction"
- Ralph Burns Kellogg – organ and reeds on "Babylon"

Production

- Abe "Voco" Kesh – producer
- Hank McGill, Jay Snyder, Tony May, Eddie Kramer – engineers
