= Duck MacDonald =

American guitarist (born 1953)

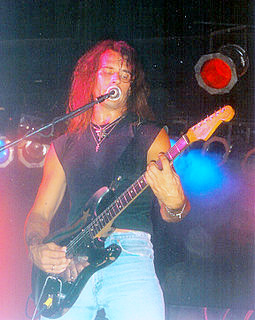

Background information
- Born: Andrew MacDonald; September 17, 1953 (age 72); Auburn, New York, U.S.
- Instruments: Vocals, Guitar
- Years active: 1970s–Present

Andrew "Duck" MacDonald (born September 17, 1953) is an American heavy metal/hard rock guitarist, who has played in several bands, the most well-known of which being Blue Cheer.

He started playing in various bands around New York City. In 1980 he was asked to join Shakin' Street, replacing guitarist Ross the Boss. Shakin Street toured the U.S., supporting Black Sabbath and Blue Öyster Cult on the Black and Blue tour. Following this and a tour of France, Shakin Street broke up.

MacDonald met with ex-Elf/Rainbow members Gary Driscoll and Craig Gruber, and started the band Bible Black. They recorded the album Ground Zero with singer Jeff Fenholt. After this, MacDonald and Driscoll worked with Anthrax producer Carl Canedy to put together the album Thrasher, with various other musicians. It was released in 1985.

For the next three years he worked with various artists, such as David Feinstein, in his band The Rods, and Kim Simmonds, in the Kim Simmonds Band. In 1988 he was contacted by Blue Cheer bassist Dickie Peterson, and he joined them for the 1989 live album Blitzkrieg over Nüremberg and 1990's Highlights and Lowlives, followed by a tour of the United States. In 1992 he left Blue Cheer, being replaced with Dieter Saller, following which he built a recording studio and started the band Playground. Playground released several unsuccessful albums before he re-joined Blue Cheer in 1999. He had been playing with them up until Dickie Peterson's death and Blue Cheer's official disbandment on October 12, 2009.

== Discography ==
With Bible Black

- Bible Black (1981)
- Ground Zero (1983)

With Thrasher

- Burning at the Speed of Light (1985)

With Lone Rager

- "Metal Rap" Single, (1985)

With Blue Cheer

- Highlights and Lowlives (1990)
- What Doesn't Kill You (2007)

Live

- Blitzkrieg Over Nüremberg (1989; Thunderbolt/Nibelung Records)
- Hello Tokyo, Bye Bye Osaka – Live in Japan 1999 (1999)
- Rocks Europe CD/DVD, 2009; Rainman/Captain Trip Records)
- Live at Anti WAA Festival 1989 CD/DVD, (2014; Nibelung Records)
- Live Bootleg: London – Hamburg (official bootleg, 2005; Rockview Records)
