= Abe Kesh =

American disc jockey and record producer

Abe Keshishian, known professionally as Abe "Voco" Kesh (November 4, 1933 – July 3, 1989) was an American disc jockey and record producer. He is best-known for discovering the seminal hard rock band Blue Cheer, and for producing their first two albums, Vincebus Eruptum and Outsideinside. He also produced the band's 1968 Top 10 cover of Eddie Cochran's "Summertime Blues."

He worked as a DJ at the legendary KSAN San Francisco doing the overnight show. He was born in Detroit, and died at the Marin Hotel in San Rafael, where he lived the final 14 years of his life.

== Record production ==
Besides Blue Cheer, Kesh produced albums by Harvey Mandel, Graham Bond, Morning Glory, Linn County, The Savage Resurrection, Don Robertson, and others. Many of the artists he worked with originated or first achieved prominence in the San Francisco Bay area. He produced recordings for a number of labels, including Mercury, Philips, Fontana, Blue Thumb, Pulsar, and Janus.

Kesh produced Chuck Berry's Live at the Fillmore Auditorium after Berry's release from jail in 1967. Steve Miller was part of Berry's band, and recalled that during rehearsals, "All of a sudden, Mercury Records says, 'This is great. We want to make a live album.' And a deal was struck that afternoon the day we were going to do the show. They brought in this funky little board to record it on. All of a sudden, this guy Abe Kesh shows up, who was the producer for Mercury. We're rehearsing and all ready to go when he takes Chuck Berry outside for 10 minutes before the show. Chuck comes back in and he's almost unconscious, like he's in slow motion. They went out and had a shot or something. We did four sets and we recorded the album. It came out pretty good."

In 1972, he produced the compilation album Lights Out: San Francisco (Voco Presents the Soul of the Bay Area), spotlighting music from the San Francisco region. The album, released on the Blue Thumb label, featured tracks by John Lee Hooker, Tower of Power, Sylvester and the Hot Band, Dan Hicks & His Hot Licks, and other artists.

== Radio broadcasting ==
Kesh was a radio personality on San Francisco rock station KSAN in the late 1960s, hosting a program titled "Lights Out San Francisco." He was the first rock DJ to air the gospel recording "Oh Happy Day" by the Edwin Hawkins Singers. According to a May 1969 article in Rolling Stone, the album had been released in limited quantities to the gospel market in 1967. In 1969, "John Lingel, rock promotion director at Chatton Distributors in Oakland, was going through some gospel product lying around when he stumbled onto the Hawkins LP [...]. He gave it to Abe 'Voco' Kesh at KSAN-FM, who, he says, 'immediately flipped,' and the rush of phone calls confirmed gospel-fan Lingel's hunch: 'Oh Happy Day' was hit material." Based on the reaction to Kesh's airing, Buddah Records signed the Edwin Hawkins Singers, gave them a $50,000 advance, and the single "Oh Happy Day" became an international hit.
