= Kak (band) =

American psychedelic rock band

- Origin: Davis, California, U. S.
- Genres: Psychedelic rock; country rock
- Years active: 1967-1969
- Labels: Epic
- Past members: Gary Lee Yoder; Dehner Patten; Joe Dave Damrell; Chris Lockheed

Kak was an American psychedelic rock band, based in San Francisco between 1967 and 1969.

The band was formed in Davis, California, in late 1967, by singer, songwriter and rhythm guitarist Gary Lee Yoder, and lead guitarist Dehner Patten. Both had previously been members of The Oxford Circle, a garage rock and early psychedelic band. Adding Joe Dave Damrell on bass and sitar, and Chris Lockheed on drums and harpsichord, they started performing together as Kak around San Francisco. After meeting songwriter and record producer Gary Grelecki, they were signed by Epic Records.

The band released their only album, Kak, in 1968, with all songs written or co-written by Yoder, some with Grelecki, in a style influenced by such artists as Moby Grape, Quicksilver Messenger Service, the Grateful Dead, and Donovan. Reviewer Richie Unterberger characterizes the music as "minor-league San Francisco psychedelic rock". Two singles, "Everything's Changing" and "I've Got Time", were also released but were unsuccessful.

Damrell left the band before the end of 1968, and Kak split up early in 1969. After one solo single, Yoder later joined Blue Cheer.

Although, at the time, Kak's records were not successful, they later became highly collectable, and the album was bootlegged. It was legitimately reissued in 1999, as Kak-Ola, with additional tracks including demo recordings and solo tracks by Yoder.
