= The Fender IV =

- Origin: Baltimore Maryland, United States
- Genres: Surf rock
- Years active: 1963-1964, 2016
- Labels: Imperial
- Past members: Randy Holden; Joe Kooken (AKA: Jac Ttanna, Jack Thomas); Mike Port; Bruce Miller

The Fender IV were an American surf rock band of the 1960s.

The Fender IV were started up in Baltimore, by guitarist Randy Holden. Although almost prevented by an incident with a bumble bee, he successfully moved the band to Southern California in 1963, in order to play for a more receptive audience. Their music was strongly influenced by Dick Dale, and The Ventures. When the popularity for surf music decreased their style changed to a vocal based sound, and they changed name to The Sons of Adam, bestowed upon them by the record producer Kim Fowley.

In 2016, Randy Holden was contacted by Matt Quilter to play at the "Surf 101 Convention", Alpine Village, Torrence CA. The result was Randy reforming the Fender IV group with original rhythm guitarist, Joe Kooken (aka: Jac Ttanna). The additional musicians for the show were Matt Quilter on bass and Dusty Watson (who has played for Dick Dale) on drums. Subsequently, a DVD of the concert was released. Additionally, as a result of the "Surf 101 Convention" show, Randy was invited to play the Surfer Joe Summer Festival in Livorno, Italy, June 22 through June 25, 2017.

== Band members ==
- Randy Holden - guitar, vocals
- Joe Kooken (d.2022) - guitar
- Mike Port (d.2014) - bass
- Bruce Miller - drums

== Singles ==
- "Mar Gaya" / "You Better Tell Me Now" (Imperial 66061, 1964)
- "Malibu Run" / "Everybody Up" (Imperial 66098, 1965)

== CDs ==
- Randy Holden: Early Works 64-66 (including 'Fender IV' and 'The Sons of Adam' material)
- Saturday's Sons: The Complete Recordings 1964–1966 (2022 compilation of all known 'Fender IV' and 'The Sons of Adam' studio recordings, plus a live 1966 'TSOA' show.)

== DVDs ==
- Fender IV: Surf 101 - Live (2016)
