= Randy Holden =

American musician

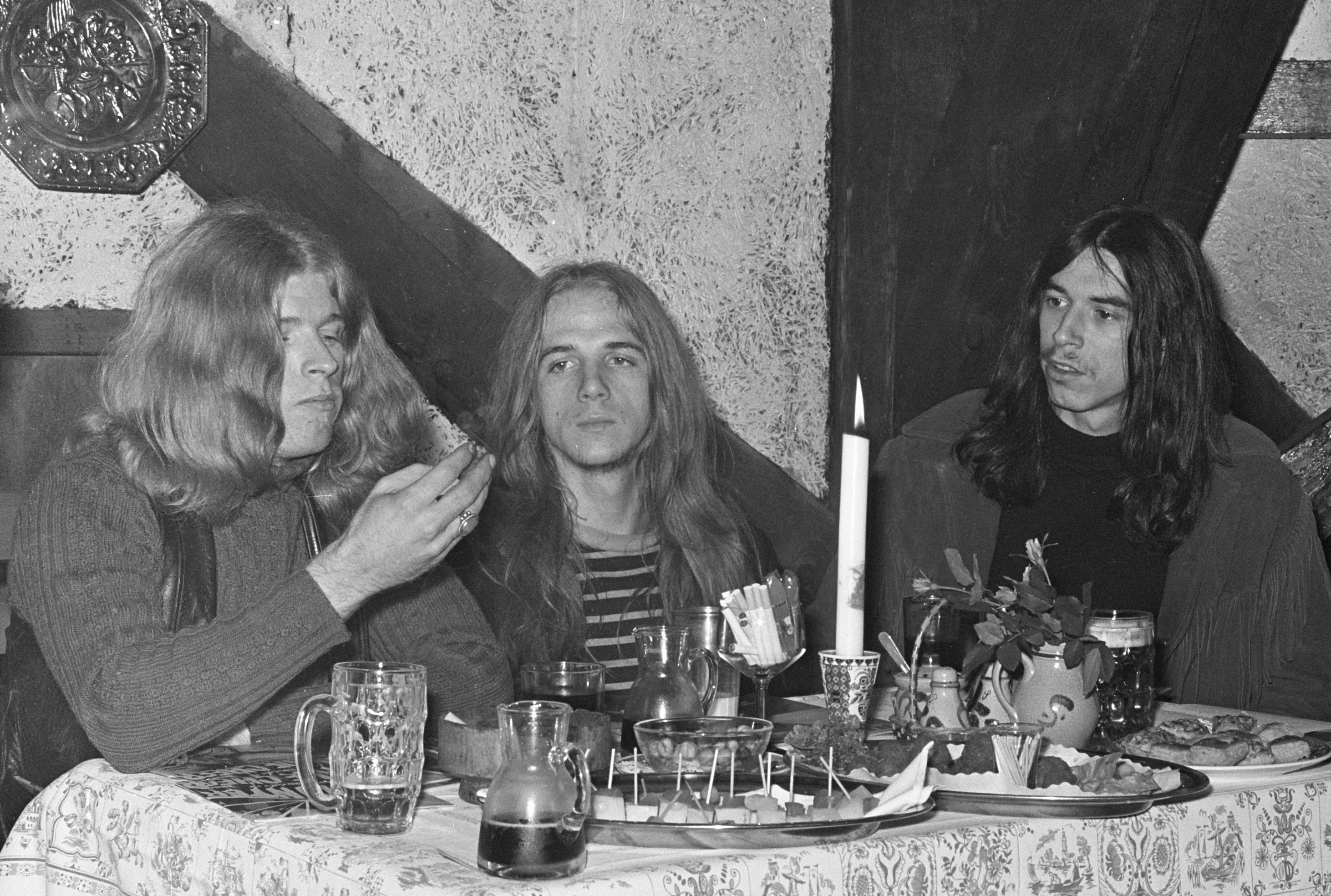
- Holden (right) with Dickie Peterson (left) and Paul Whaley (center) of Blue Cheer (1968)

Background information
- Born: July 2, 1945 (age 81)
- Origin: Pennsylvania, U.S.
- Genres: Hard rock; heavy metal; acid rock; psychedelic rock; blues rock
- Occupation: Musician
- Instruments: Guitar, vocals
- Years active: 1959–70, 1993–present
- Website: www.randyholden.com

Randy Holden (born July 2, 1945) is an American guitarist best known for being a member of the West Coast acid rock group Blue Cheer and performance on their third album, New! Improved! (1969). His solo album Population II (1970) is considered to be one of the earliest examples of doom metal. Holden is also a painter.

== Biography ==
Randy Holden was born in Pennsylvania and grew up on the move. He played in a number of bands, including the Iridescents (blues rock), the Fender IV (surf rock) and the Sons of Adam (surf rock/psychedelic rock). Holden relocated the Fender IV from Baltimore, Maryland, to Southern California and they eventually became the Sons of Adam. While playing in the Sons of Adam, Holden opened for the Rolling Stones at their first show at the Long Beach Sports Arena. Holden was heavily influenced by Keith Richards' guitar and amp set up, which helped change his own attitude towards equipment and tone. The Sons of Adam (specifically Holden) began experimenting with distortion and feedback, which pushed into psychedelic rock. Holden left the band frustrated with the lack of original material.

Holden joined the Other Half, a psychedelic garage band from Los Angeles. In 1968, they recorded an album, but Holden soon left and replaced Leigh Stephens in Blue Cheer. He toured with them for a year and contributed three songs for the album New! Improved! Blue Cheer (1969). He is credited with the songwriting, vocal, and guitars for "Peace of Mind", "Fruits & Icebergs", and "Honey Butter Love". He left the group during the recording sessions and the rest of the album was recorded with other musicians.

Frustrated with lack of control over the bands, Randy formed his next new band with drummer Chris Lockheed. Lockheed, also a keyboard player, uniquely played both drums and keyboard simultaneously in live performances. During this time Holden obtained a sponsorship deal with Sunn amplifiers. Through this, he received his famous sixteen 200-watt amplifiers. His new band was dubbed "Randy Holden – Population II", which referred to the band having only two members, and to the astronomical term "population II", which is "a category of stars that have heavy metal in their composition, an appropriate description of the original style of the music attributed to the band". (In actual fact, Population II, or metal-poor, stars are those with relatively little of the elements heavier than helium.) The band recorded only one album, Population II (1970). Trouble with its release led to Holden going bankrupt, losing all his equipment, and departing from music for over two decades. The album was released multiple times in bootleg forms over the years, with no official re-release until a limited issue in LP in 2005 and finally a remastered CD in 2008. The album has become a much-sought-after collector's item over the years.

After more than two decades he returned to his guitar, and began creating music again, reportedly at the continual urging of a loyal fan. He recorded Guitar God in 1994 and released Guitar God 2001 in 2001, followed in 2008 with the release of Raptor.

In 2008, Richie Unterberger said "He's a good candidate for selection as the great unknown 1960s rock guitar hero. No other American guitarist was as skilled at creating the kind of sustain-heavy, snaky guitar lines pioneered by Jeff Beck in the Yardbirds. His recordings with the Fender IV, the Sons of Adam, Ugly Things, the Other Half, and Blue Cheer, as well as his solo recordings, don't only contain some feverishly innovative playing, they also chart the overall rainbow of changes undergone by California 1960s rock guitar as a whole, from surf to pseudo-Merseybeat to psychedelia, hard rock and heavy metal."

In 2010, Holden began working with Randy Pratt (Cactus) and drummer Bobby Rondinelli (Black Sabbath, Rainbow, Blue Öyster Cult) on Population III, released by Ridingeasy Records on July 1, 2022. Pratt and Holden both composed the songs on Population III.

== Personal life ==
Randy is married to American artist Ruth Mayer. His son, Marlon Holden, is a photographer.

== Discography ==
The Fender IV

- "Mar Gaya" / "You Better Tell Me Now" (1964 Imperial single)
- "Malibu Run" / "Everybody Up" (1965 Imperial single)
- Fender IV: Surf 101 – Live (2016 DVD)

The Sons of Adam

- "Take My Hand" / "Tomorrow's Gonna Be Another Day" (1965 Decca single)
- "You're a Better Man Than I" / "Saturday's Son" (1966 Decca single)

The Other Half

- The Other Half (1968 Acta album)

Blue Cheer

- New! Improved! (1969 side 2 only)

Lucifer

- Unreleased album (1969–1970)

Touch of Heaven

- Visions of You (2010 collaborative project with opera singer Jaclyn Guthrie)

Solo

- Population II (1970)
- Guitar God (1997)
- Early Works '64–'66 (1997 compilation of singles with Fender IV and Sons of Adam plus some demos)
- Guitar God 2001 (2001)
- Surf Guitar God 1963/2001 (2007 Fender IV compilation plus new music)
- Raptor (2007)
- Psychedelic Blue (2011 largely a covers album with some new material)
- Population III (2022)
