= Uptight Tonight: The Ultimate 1960s Garage Punk Primer =

Compilation album
- Released: June 21, 2005
- Recorded: 1960s
- Genre: Garage rock; proto-punk
- Length: 1:05:03
- Label: Big Beat

Uptight Tonight: The Ultimate 1960s Garage Punk Primer is a garage rock compilation put out in 2005 by Big Beat Records. The set consists of twenty-six tracks that, with a few exceptions, focus on the harder and more aggressive side of the genre. Steve Legget, commenting in AllMusic, writes that Uptight Tonight "...rips out the attitude and trash riffs pretty darn well, making it perhaps the ultimate single-disc set of this raggedly endearing (and enduring) rock style." The packaging includes well-researched liner notes written by Alec Palao, which provide helpful biographical information about the artists and their songs, as well as extensive photographs of the bands."

The set commences with the sound of overdriven guitars that propel "Action Woman" by the Litter, while the Sonics' respond with "He's Waitin'", from their 1966 Boom LP, with its brash power chords "turned up to eleven". The Outcasts' carry on with "I'm in Pittsburgh (And It's Raining)", followed by the adrenaline-laced intensity of the Unrelated Segments' "Where You Gonna Go". The Castaways' "Liar Liar" provided the group with a #1 hit in 1965, while The Wailers' "Hang Up" provides enough primitive fuzz-driven "scorched earth policy" to satiate appetites of the more carnivorous variety 1960s garage punk devotees. The set's title song, "Uptight Tonight" is by Flash and the Casuals from Memphis who were led by David "Flash" Fleishman. The Oxford Circle, do "Foolish Woman", which builds up to a climactic breakneck-speed rave-up at the end. The Moving Sidewalks, featuring Billy Gibbons, later of ZZ Top, do "99th Floor", while Teddy & His Patches provide the album's most "flipped out" track, "Suzy Creamcheese". Denise & Company, led by Denise Kaufman, later of the Ace of Cups, provide an antidote to male misogyny in the scathing "Boy, What'll You Do Then". Texas' The Sparkles are represented with "No Friend of Mine", which starts with a double-stroke drum beat then races into a fuzz-drenched invective, followed by The Count Five's Yardbirds-influenced 1966 hit, "Psychotic Reaction". The Chob ensue with an ample amount of "brat punk" braggadocio in "We're Pretty Quick", while the Music Machine, led by Sean Bonniwell experiment with adventuresome time changes and odd meter in "Talk Talk". The Seeds' perennial garage classic, "Pushin' Too Hard" is included, along with Mouse and the Traps' churning "Maid of Sugar, Maid of Spice". The Wilde Knights close the set with "Beaver Patrol".

== Track listing ==
1. The Litter: "Action Woman" (Warren Kendrick) 2:32
2. The Sonics: "He's Waitin'" (Gerald Roslie) 2:41
3. The Outcasts: "I'm in Pittsburgh (And It's Raining)" 2:03
4. The Unrelated Segments' "Where You Gonna Go" (Rory Mack/Ron Stults)
5. The Castaways: "Liar Liar" 2:45 (James Donna) 1:50
6. The Wailers: "Hang Up" (Ron Gardner) 2:23
7. Flash & the Memphis Casuals: "Uptight Tonight" (Jim Dickinson) 2:17
8. The Oxford Circle: "Foolish Woman" (Dehner E. Patten/Gary Yoder) 2:31
9. The Moving Sidewalks: "99th Floor" (Billy Gibbons) 2:39
10. Teddy & His Patches: "Suzy Creamcheese" (Dave Conway) 3:11
11. Denise & Company: "Boy, What'll You Do Then" (Denise Kaufman) 2:29
12. The Sparkles: "No Friend of Mine" (Larry Parks/Jay Turnbow) 2:24
13. The Count Five: "Psychotic Reaction" (Craig "Butch" Atkinson/John Byrne/Roy Chaney/ Kenn Ellner/John Michalski) 3:07
14. The Chob: "We're Pretty Quick" 2:25
15. The Music Machine: "Talk Talk" (Sean Bonniwell) 1:58
16. The Electric Company: "Scary Business" (George "Funky" Brown) 3:11
17. Dean Carter: "Jailhouse Rock" (Jerry Leiber/Mike Stoller) 2:14
18. The Vagrants: "I Can't Make a Friend" (Trade Martin/Jerry Storch) 2:34
19. Madd, Inc.: "I'll Be the One" 2:39
20. The Seeds: "Pushin' Too Hard" (Sky Saxon) 2:35
21. The Express: "Wastin' My Time" (Dennis Maxwell) 2:47
22. Mouse and the Traps: "Maid of Sugar, Maid of Spice" (Ronny Weiss) 2:38
23. The Orfuns: "The Animal in Me" (Jerry McCann) 2:26
24. Lindy & the Lavells: "You Ain't Tuff" 2:19
25. The Soul Vendors: "Get Out of My Eye" 2:05
26. The Wilde Knights: "Beaver Patrol" 2:20

== Catalogue and release information ==
- Uptight Tonight: The Ultimate 1960s Garage Punk Primer (Big Beat CDWIKND 225, 2005)
