= Highlights and Lowlives =

Highlights And Lowlives

Studio album by Blue Cheer
- Released: 1990
- Recorded: January–February 1990
- Studio: Foel Studio, Llanfair Caereinion, Powys, Wales
- Genre: Blues rock, heavy metal, stoner rock
- Length: 40:11; 44:00 (Bonus track release)
- Label: Thunderbolt (UK and US); Nibelung (Germany)
- Producer: Jack Endino, Roland Hofmann

Blue Cheer chronology
The Beast Is Back (1984)	Highlights And Lowlives (1990)	Dining with the Sharks (1991)

Professional ratings
Review scores
Source	Rating
AllMusic	1.5/5 stars
Collector's Guide to Heavy Metal	4/10

Highlights and Lowlives is the eighth studio album by American rock band Blue Cheer, released in 1990 and produced by Jack Endino. The bonus track Blues Cadillac is on some versions/releases and can be hidden on some of the CDs.

== Track listing ==
1. "Urban Soldiers" (Dickie Peterson) – 4:09
2. "Hunter of Love" (Duck MacDonald, Peterson) – 5:32
3. "Girl from London" (MacDonald, Peterson) – 5:40
4. "Blue Steel Dues" (MacDonald, Peterson) – 6:19
5. "Big Trouble in Paradise" (Peterson, Rainer) – 4:11
6. "Flight of the Enola Gay" (MacDonald, Peterson) – 3:49
7. "Hoochie Coochie Man" (Willie Dixon) – 5:56
8. "Down and Dirty" (MacDonald, Peterson) – 4:35

Bonus track

9. "Blues Cadillac" (Peterson) – 3:49

== Personnel ==
Blue Cheer

- Dickie Peterson – bass guitar, lead vocals
- Duck MacDonald – lead guitar, backing vocals
- Paul Whaley – drums

Production

- Jack Endino – producer
- Dave Anderson, Ivor Mladek – engineers
- Rainer Kleber – mastering
- Roland Hofmann – executive producer
