= The Other Half (band) =

American psychedelic garage rock band

- Origin: Los Angeles, California, United States
- Genres: Psychedelic rock; garage rock
- Years active: 1966–1968
- Labels: Acta; Orlyn

The Other Half was an American psychedelic garage rock band, based in San Francisco, and active in the mid-to-late 1960s. The band gained interest after one of the Nuggets compilations in the 1980s included their single "Mr. Pharmacist".

== History ==
The Other Half formed in Los Angeles California, United States, but later moved to San Francisco. They played several shows at Chet Helms Family Dog shows at the Avalon Ballroom. Their music was strongly influenced by the Yardbirds and Rolling Stones. Former The Sons of Adam guitarist Guitarist Randy Holden had been offered the chance to replace Jeff Beck in the Yardbirds before joining The Other Half. The Other Half were at their peak when the music scene was at its height in San Francisco and the Flower Power movement in full swing in Haight Ashbury. Their style changed from an earlier vocal based garage band, to the loudest big stage band sound of the time, taken in that direction by Holden. Their sound has been compared to the Yardbirds, and contained elements of blues, hard rock, and Eastern melodic influences. Holden left the band after their debut album was recorded, dissatisfied with the recording and the guitar he was playing at the time, later stating "I was trying to accommodate everyone else, at the expense of my own soul and happiness". Despite Holden's misgivings, the album has been described as "awesome incendiary rock".

Holden went on to join Blue Cheer before embarking on a solo career.

The band's "Mr. Pharmacist" was included on one of the Nuggets compilations in the early 1980s, Volume 12: Punk Part Three, and was later covered by The Fall, becoming a number 75 UK chart hit. A collection of their recordings, titled Mr. Pharmacist was issued in 1982. This included their entire 1968 album and several tracks from singles. Two songs, "Bad Day" and "Oz Lee Eaves Drops" appeared in the 1968 pilot episode of The Mod Squad.

== Band members ==
- Randy Holden – Lead guitar, vocals
- Geoff Westen – Rhythm guitar, vocals
- Larry Brown – Bass guitar
- Danny Woody – Drums
- Jeff Nowlen – Vocalist

== Singles ==
- "Mr. Pharmacist" / "I've Come So Far" (GNP Crescendo 378X, Nov 1966)
- "Wonderful Day" / "Flight of the Dragon Lady" (Acta 801, Mar 1967)
- "I Need You" / "No Doubt About It" (Acta 806, Jul 1967)
- "What Can I Do For You" / "Bad Day" (Acta 819, Feb 1968)
- "Morning Fire" / "Oz Lee Eaves Drops" (Acta 825, May 1968)

== Vinyl LPs ==
- The Other Half (Acta 38004, 1968; reissued on Radioactive 025, 2004)
- Mr. Pharmacist (Eva 12003, 1982) – this too is a reissue of Acta 38004
