= The Sons of Adam =

American garage rock band

- Origin: Baltimore, Maryland, United States
- Genres: Garage rock, rock and roll, proto-punk, hard rock, surf rock
- Years active: 1965–1967
- Labels: Decca, Alamo
- Past members: Randy Holden; Joe Kooken (Jac Ttanna); Mike Port; Michael Stuart; Craig Tarwater; Randy Carlisle

The Sons of Adam (earlier the Fender IV) were an American garage rock band. Originally from Baltimore, Maryland, they relocated to Los Angeles and became a regular fixture on the Sunset Strip music scene during the mid-1960s. The band released several singles for the Decca and Alamo labels, which included the songs "Saturday's Son", "Feathered Fish" (written by Arthur Lee) and "Baby Show the World". They included guitarist Randy Holden, later of The Other Half and Blue Cheer, and drummer Michael Stuart, later of Love. Although the band, with Randy Holden, played "Feathered Fish" in clubs before it was recorded, Craig Tarwater played the guitar on the studio recording since Holden had left by then.

== History ==
=== Origins ===
The band, from Baltimore, Maryland, was founded in 1962 as The Iridescents, by guitarist Randy Holden, who had previously played in other local rock and roll bands, and bassist Mike Port. By 1963, they had enlisted Sonny Lombardo on drums, then adding Joe Kooken (later known as Jac Ttanna) on guitar, to complete the original lineup. They were originally a surf rock and instrumental group. Holden, then a fan of Duane Eddy, stated:

My band was more rock or hard rock-oriented. To define that, you’d have to say Duane Eddy was ‘hard rock’ back then... I wanted to do surf music, because—well, actually it wasn’t called surf music yet. I liked the instrumental vein...”

By the end of 1963, the band's repertoire had become completely dominated by surf influences. They changed their name to The Fendermen, and made arrangements to relocate to Southern California, in hopes of riding the crest of the then-current surf rock craze to find success in Los Angeles, which was becoming a center of the recording industry. The band departed in a Volkswagen bus and drove to California, and arrived there in November 1963, shortly before John F. Kennedy's assassination.

=== The Fender IV: California ===
As drummer Sonny Lombardo was unable to accompany them to California, the band recruited a new drummer, Bruce Miller. Unlike in Maryland, the drinking age in California was 21, so the band members went to Tijuana, Mexico and had fake IDs made in order to be able to play gigs at nightclubs and bars. They were eventually able to get steady work playing gigs at the popular night-spot, Gazzarri’s. In 1964 they changed their name to The Fender-Menn IV, and later The Fender IV, a move partially motivated by a deal they made with Fender to provide the group with free equipment, and to avoid confusion with another group called Irridescents, from Santa Barbara, who would later become Thee Sixpence and eventually Strawberry Alarm Clock.

They signed with managers Bill Doane and Ozzie Schmidt who were familiar with surf and the West Coast scene. Doane and Schmidt knew music biz mogul Russ Regan, who arranged for the group to be signed to the Imperial label. In the summer of 1964, they recorded two singles (as The Fender IV) at Los Angeles' Gold Star Studios, the home of many of Phil Spector’s recordings at the time. Several months before they recorded this first single, The Beatles had appeared on the Ed Sullivan Show and the British Invasion had swept the music industry. So the flip side of the record, "You Better Tell Me Now", would be a Mersey-inspired vocal track, which would point to the direction of their later work as the Sons of Adam. With the British Invasion in full effect, the band members of The Fender IV began to feel the pull, but at least initially Randy Holden was reluctant to make the full switch away from instrumental music. However, after having a chance to meet and "jam" with Brian Jones and Bill Wyman a while before The Rolling Stones' performance on the Hollywood Palace TV show, and getting to know members of other L.A. rock acts such as The Turtles, Holden's reluctance to embrace vocal rock subsided. He and the group began to favor R&B-flavored rock and started including covers of Stones' songs in their sets.

In 1964 drummer Bruce Miller was drafted into the Army, so they found Keith Kester to take his place. Perhaps as a result of their previous time as an instrumental band, they became highly respected amongst L.A. bands for their musical prowess, and were considered one of the better live acts in town. They became a frequent attraction at clubs on the Sunset Strip in Los Angeles, and were able to land a residency at Ciro’s. By 1965, the band's musical direction had shifted dramatically to a Beat group orientation. The popularity of surf music waned, and their style changed to vocal-based R&B and rock songs. They were seen by Dewey Martin, who had been performing as the leader of Sir Raleigh & The Coupons, and recruited the band to back him at shows in Seattle and Juneau. As Sir Raleigh & The Coupons, they recorded a single, "Tomorrow's Gonna Be Another Day", on the Jerden label.

=== The Sons of Adam ===
Back in Los Angeles, they resisted Martin's attempts to replace Holden with Neil Young, and continued to perform as The Fender IV, with Kester, whose personality and image differed from that of other group members, being replaced by drummer Michael Stuart (later Stuart-Ware). It was during this time that they changed their name to the Sons of Adam, which was suggested by record producer and impresario Kim Fowley. They replaced The Walker Brothers as resident band at Gazzarri's, and became noted for their loud volume, Holden repeating the mantra "Never turn down". Holden later claimed he was approached around this time to replace Jeff Beck in The Yardbirds.

After auditioning for producer Gary Usher, they secured a recording contract with Decca Records. They made a brief appearance playing in a nightclub scene in the 1965 movie The Slender Thread starring Anne Bancroft, though the music was later overdubbed by session musicians. The group recorded their first single with Gary Usher producing, "Take My Hand", released in mid-October 1965. The song failed to gain any traction on the charts.

By the end of the year, disappointed in lack of record sales, the band broke off connections with Bill Doane and Ozzie Schmidt. They entered into an unwritten agreement with Dick St John (of Dick & Dee Dee) and Mike Post. In 1966 they returned to the studio with producer Gary Usher and engineer David Hassinger to record "Saturday's Son," an anthem of alienation, featuring Randy Holden on lead guitar and vocals; it appeared on a single, along with their version of "You're a Better Man Than I," previously recorded by The Yardbirds, as the flipside. The band believed that they had a strong record that had a chance to break them in the charts, but the single failed to catch on. Around this time the band hired a new manager, Howard Wolf, to conduct their affairs.

As the year progressed, Holden's behavior, and emphasis on volume, became increasingly erratic, and his relationship with the other band members became strained. The band pushed him out, a decision they later regretted, and replaced him with Craig Tarwater (aka John Simmons), on lead guitar. Holden joined The Other Half. The Sons of Adam continued to play and record, releasing another single on Alamo records, featuring "Feathered Fish", written by Arthur Lee of Love, who was attempting to convince drummer Michael Stuart to join his band, and the flip side "Baby Show the World." However, without Randy Holden the band lost much of its former musical chemistry. Michael Stuart, after Arthur Lee's constant requests, finally decided to join Love as their drummer just in time for the recording of Da Capo and then for their third album, the seminal Forever Changes; he was replaced in the Sons of Adam by Randy Carlisle from The Yellow Payges. Craig Tarwater soon left to join The Daily Flash.

By June 1967, the Sons of Adam had disbanded. After the band broke up, Kooken and Port formed a new band, Genesis, but it soon collapsed and Port left the music industry. He experienced homelessness and drug problems before his death in 2014. Kooken, later known as Jac Ttanna, died in Thailand in 2022.

== Band members ==
- Randy Holden - guitar, vocals (1965-1966)
- Joe Kooken (aka Jac Ttanna) - guitar (1965-1967; died 2022)
- Mike Port - bass (1965-1967; died 2014)
- Michael Stuart - drums (1965-1967)
- Craig Tarwater - guitar, vocals (1966-1967)
- Randy Carlisle - drums (1967)

== Discography ==
=== Singles ===
- "Take My Hand" / "Tomorrow's Gonna Be Another Day" (Decca, Dec 1965) - produced by Gary Usher
- "You're a Better Man Than I" (written by Mike Hugg, Brian Hugg) / "Saturday’s Son" (Decca, Jul 1966) - produced by Gary Usher
- "Feathered Fish" (written by Arthur Lee) / "Baby Show the World" (Alamo, 1966) - also recorded by The Other Half

=== CDs ===
- Randy Holden: Early Works 64-66 (including 'Fender IV' and 'The Sons of Adam' material) --- Released on Captain Trip Records in 1997. Re-mastered and later released as The Sons of Adam: Bytes (including 'Fender IV' material) on Guitar God Records in 2007.
- Saturday's Sons: The Complete Recordings 1964–1966 --- 2022 compilation on High Moon Records of all known 'Fender IV' and 'The Sons of Adam' studio recordings, plus a live 1966 'TSOA' show.
