= Eric Albronda =

American drummer, music manager, record producer (1945–2024)

- Born: November 18, 1945; Long Beach, California
- Died: July 7, 2024 (aged 78) Mount Shasta, California, U.S.
- Occupations: Musician; music manager; record producer
- Instrument: Drums
- Formerly of: Blue Cheer

Eric Albronda (November 18, 1945 – July 7, 2024) was an American musician and the first drummer for Blue Cheer, briefly, prior to being replaced by Paul Whaley. He also co-produced (with Leigh Stephens) Red Weather, the first solo album by former Blue Cheer guitarist Leigh Stephens, as well as the eponymous solo album by one of Stephens' post Blue Cheer bands, Pilot.

The group Pilot had as its vocalist Bruce Stephens, often confused with Leigh Stephens. Eric Albronda co-produced the Pilot album with Bruce Stephens at Trident Studios in London. The recordings were done in 1971 and released on RCA Records. The song "Fillmore Shuffle" was covered by Sammy Hagar.

Albronda died on July 7, 2024, following complications from an automobile accident.
