= The Oxford Circle =

American garage and psychedelic rock band

Background information
- Origin: Davis, California, United States
- Genres: Psychedelic rock; garage rock; blues rock; proto-punk
- Years active: 1964–1967
- Label: World United
- Past members: Gary Lee Yoder; Dehner Patten; Jim Keylor; Paul Whaley

The Oxford Circle was an American garage rock and psychedelic rock band from Davis, California, near Sacramento, who were active from 1964 to 1967. They became a popular garage rock act with a proto-punk sound influenced by Them and other blues-based bands of the British Invasion, that, in addition to heavy guitar feedback, came to encompass psychedelia. The group began to make appearances in San Francisco, where they became a top draw in venues such as the Avalon Ballroom. They taped a show at the Avalon in 1966 and, after lying in the vaults for years, it was rereleased in 1997 on the Nuggets from California: Live at the Avalon 1966 anthology. In November 1966, they released the single, "Foolish Woman" b/w "Mind Destruction", which is also included, along with several other studio outtakes, on the Nuggets from California compilation. In 1967, drummer Paul Whaley left to play in pioneering heavy rock act Blue Cheer. Lead vocalist and guitarist Gary Lee Yoder and lead guitarist Dehner Patten left to form Kak, who recorded for Epic Records. Yoder subsequently went on to join Blue Cheer in one of their later configurations.

The Oxford Circle began as the Hideaways in 1964 and they were from Davis, California, which is a university town just outside of Sacramento, and Northeast of San Francisco. Their membership consisted of Gary Lee Yoder on lead vocals and rhythm guitar, Dehner Patten on lead guitar, Jim Keylor on bass, and Paul Whaley on drums. They quickly became popular in the regional teen scene and in 1965 changed their name to the Oxford Circle (a small street in Davis), in deference the popular British Invasion, particularly some of the tougher blues-based bands such as Them, led by Van Morrison, who were particularly influential. The group became known for their intense live performances which included occasional use of heavy feedback from their guitars.

Sensing a new market for their style of playing, the Oxford Circle began to make trips to San Francisco to play in the psychedelic pattern-projected, strobe-lit ballrooms there, where they became a popular live act, on several occasions sharing the bill with the Grateful Dead, Quicksilver Messenger Service, and Big Brother and the Holding Company. They played at venues such as the Avalon Ballroom, operated by Family Dog and Chet Helms, where they made a live recording that would remain in the vaults for years, which is highly indicative of their performances at the time in which they mix garage-based proto-punk with psychedelic experimentation. At that show they performed a nine-minute feedback-laden version of "Mystic Eyes", previously recorded by Them, a version of the Yardbirds' "Mister, You're a Better Man Than I", and blues "war-horses" such as "Baby Please Don't Go", later recorded by the Amboy Dukes and Bo Diddley's "I'm A Man". In November 1966, they released the single "Foolish Woman" b/w "Mind Destruction" on World United Records. Drummer Paul Whaley eventually joined heavy rock pioneers Blue Cheer, but it created a vacuum in the band which led to their eventual dissolution. Future blues star Joe Louis Walker played with the group briefly. Yoder and Patten left to form Kak, who recorded for Epic, and Yoder subsequently joined Blue Cheer in one of their later configurations. By the end of 1967, the Oxford Circle were no more.

In recent years the Oxford Circle's reputation has grown amongst psychedelic and garage rock enthusiasts. Their entire 1966 concert recorded at the Avalon Ballroom, along with the single, "Foolish Woman" (both the live and studio versions of the song are included) and other studio tracks, were released in 1997 in pristine sound quality on the Nuggets from California: Live at the Avalon 1966 anthology, put out by Big Beat Records. The studio version of "Foolish Woman" was released on the 2004 deluxe 5-CD box set compilation Trash Box issued by Hit Records and on Uptight Tonight: The Ultimate 1960s Garage Punk Primer, put out by Big Beat Records.

== Membership ==
- Gary Lee Yoder (lead vocals and rhythm guitar)
- Dehner Patten (lead guitar)
- Jim Keylor (bass)
- Paul Whaley (drums)

== Discography ==
=== 45 r.p.m. single ===
- "Foolish Woman" b/w "Mind Destruction" (World United 002, November 1966)

=== Anthology/Live album ===
- Nuggets from California: Live at the Avalon 1966 (Big Beat, 1997)

== Bibliography ==
- Markesich, Mike (2012). Teenbeat Mayhem (1st ed.). Branford, Connecticut: Priceless Info Press. ISBN 978-0-985-64825-1.
