= Linn County (band) =

- Also known as: Linn County Blues Band
- Origin: Linn County, Iowa, U.S.
- Genres: Psychedelic rock, acid rock, blues rock, progressive rock, jazz rock
- Years active: 1966–1973
- Labels: Mercury Records, Philips Records

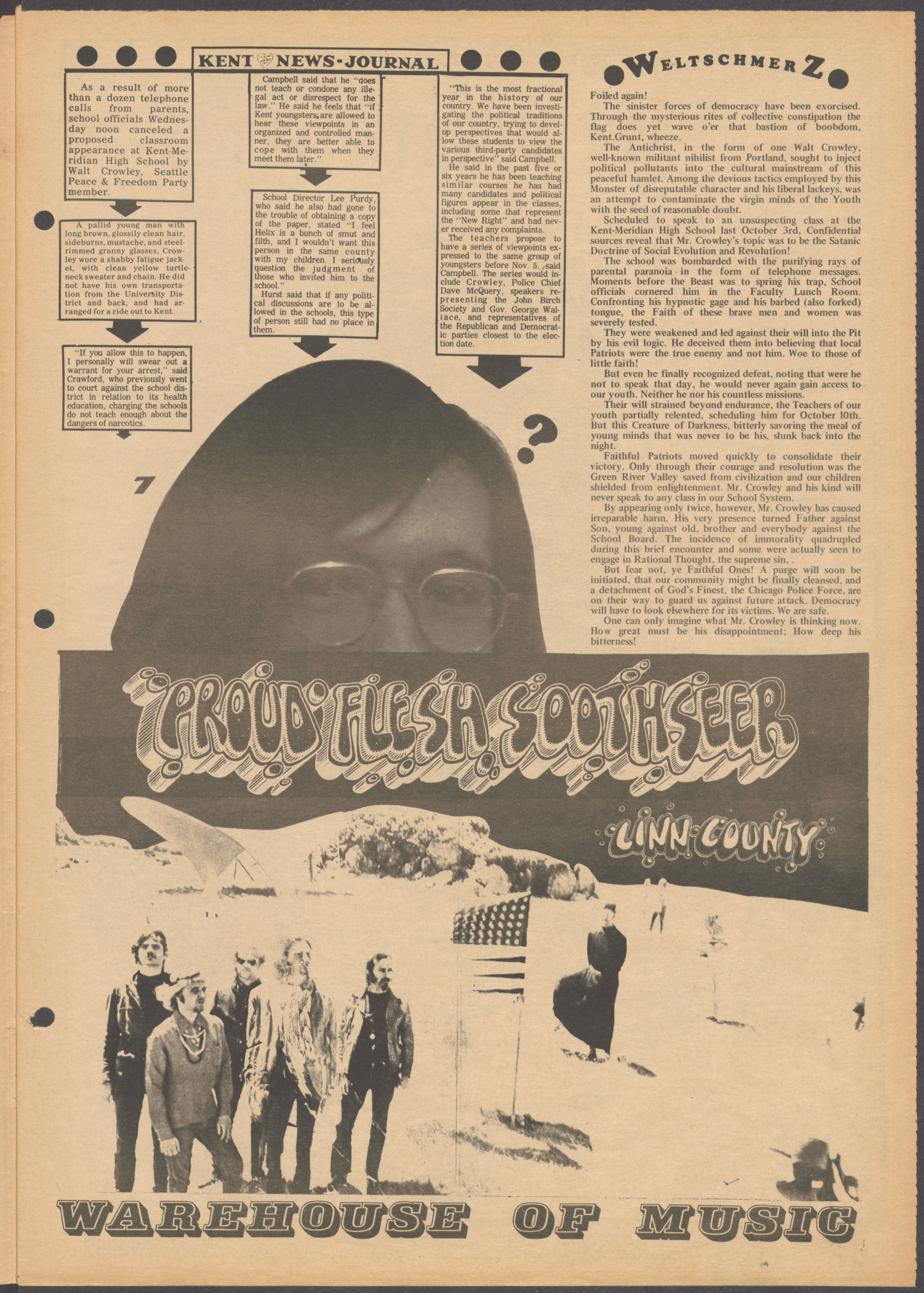
Advertisement for Proud Flesh Soothseer, 1968

Linn County was an American blues-based band based in Iowa, and later in San Francisco, California. Linn County released three albums from 1968 to 1970. Over the course of their existence, they had seven band members.

== History ==
Linn County formed around 1966 in Linn County, Iowa, United States as the Prophets. In 1968, the band signed with Mercury Records, moved to San Francisco, and changed its name to Linn County. They released their first album Proud Flesh Soothseer in 1968, and toured performing with bands and musicians such as Albert King, Led Zeppelin, Sly & the Family Stone, Eric Burdon & the Animals and Ten Years After. They were becoming more well known when the group broke up shortly after Clark Pierson left to join Janis Joplin and Stephen Miller left to join Elvin Bishop. Fred Walk kept the band together with different personnel for a time then disbanded the group in 1973. Linn County also headlined or played with Ike & Tina Turner, Earl Hooker, John Lee Hooker, Paul Butterfield, Bo Diddley, Howlin' Wolf, Elvin Bishop, Charlie Musselwhite, Steve Miller, Albert Collins and a host of others during music festivals.

== Members ==
Member	Instruments	Length
Stephen Miller	organ, vocals	1967–1970
Larry Easter	saxophone, flute	1967–1971
Bob Miskimen	bass	1967–1968
Dino Long	bass	1968–1973
Fred Walk	guitar, sitar	1967–1973
Jerry 'Snake' McAndrew	drums	1967–1969
Clark Pierson	drums	1969–1970

== Discography ==
- Proud Flesh Soothseer 1968
- Fever Shot 1969
- Till The Break Of Dawn 1970

== Bibliography ==
- Roxon, Lillian: Lilian Roxon's Rock Encyclopedia (Grosset and Dunlop, Universal Library Edition, 1972) p. 297 ISBN 0-448-00255-8
