= Gary Lee Yoder =

American musician (1946–2021)

Gary Lee Yoder (January 25, 1946 – August 7, 2021) was an American musician who was part of several 1960s San Francisco psychedelic rock bands, including the Oxford Circle, Kak, and Blue Cheer.

Yoder was born in Pasadena, California. Oxford Circle (formed in 1966) and Kak (formed in 1968) were both formed in Yoder's hometown of Davis, California, and featured the same nucleus of members. While Oxford Circle frequently shared the stage with greats such as the Grateful Dead, Jefferson Airplane, and Janis Joplin, they did not achieve the same level of fame and never got a record deal. In 1997, a live album, Live at the Avalon 1966 was released. It made #6 on Record Collector's list of Top 50 reissues of 1997, ahead of reissues of Pink Floyd, Grateful Dead, and Santana, and also received a favorable review in Mojo.

Kak would release only one record in 1969, the eponymous Kak, which has become a collector's item. It was reissued by Big Beat Records in 1999 as Kak-ola. This recording additionally contained unreleased solo work by Yoder.

Yoder performed occasionally prior to his death, aged 75 on August 7, 2021.
