= Summertime Blues =

Original song written and composed by Eddie Cochran and Jerry Capehart

- Label of the 1958 US single

Single by Eddie Cochran
- B-side: "Love Again"
- Released: July 21, 1958 (US); September 1958 (UK)
- Recorded: March 28, 1958
- Studio: Gold Star, Hollywood
- Genre: Rock and roll
- Length: 1:59
- Label: Liberty
- Songwriters: Eddie Cochran; Jerry Capehart
- Producer: Eddie Cochran

Eddie Cochran singles chronology
| "Pretty Girl" (1958) | "Summertime Blues" (1958) | "C'mon Everybody" (1958) |

"Summertime Blues" is a song co-written and recorded by the American rock artist Eddie Cochran. It was written by Cochran and his manager Jerry Capehart. Originally a single B-side, it was released in August 1958 and peaked at number 8 on the Billboard Hot 100 on September 29, 1958, and number 18 on the UK Singles Chart. It has been covered by many artists, including being a number-one hit for country music artist Alan Jackson, and scoring notable hits in versions by Blue Cheer, the Who and Brian Setzer, the last of whom recorded his version for the 1987 film La Bamba, in which he portrayed Cochran.

== Lyrics ==
The song is about the struggle between a teenager and his parents, his boss and his congressman during the summer. The narrator resents having to take a job in order to earn pocket money, and he cannot go on a date with his girlfriend because his boss keeps scheduling him to work late. After falsely telling the boss he is sick in order to get out of going to work, his parents will not let him use their car due to his laziness. Finally, he considers visiting the United Nations to complain about his situation; he settles for writing to his congressman, who brushes him off since he is too young to vote. (Note: The minimum voting age in most of the United States was 21 when the song was written. It would be lowered to 18 in 1971, following ratification of the 26th Amendment. Cochran was 19 when he recorded the song.)

== Eddie Cochran version ==
"Summertime Blues" was recorded on March 28, 1958, at Gold Star Recording Studios in Hollywood, California. Eddie Cochran sang both the vocal and bass vocal (the "work-a-late" portions, Cochran's tribute to the Kingfish character from the Amos and Andy television series), played all the guitar parts, and added the hand clapping with possibly Sharon Sheeley. Connie 'Guybo' Smith played the electric bass and Earl Palmer drums.

=== Legacy ===
The 1958 Liberty Records single by Eddie Cochran was inducted into the Grammy Hall of Fame in 1999 and the song is ranked number 73 in Rolling Stone's 500 Greatest Songs of All Time. In March 2005, Q magazine placed it at number 77 in its list of the 100 Greatest Guitar Tracks. The song is also on the Rock and Roll Hall of Fame and Museum list of "The Songs That Shaped Rock and Roll". The song appears in the films Untamed Youth performed by Cochran, Caddyshack, This Boy's Life and American Shaolin, as well as season 4 of Beverly Hills, 90210. The song is also featured in the 2010 video game Mafia II. Waylon Jennings references Eddie Cochran and "Summertime Blues" in his early 1960s song, "The Stage (Stars In Heaven)" with the lines, "A mighty cheer brings Eddie Cochran on/ "Summertime Blues" brings a happy roar/and the crowd cheers loud as they call for more."

=== Chart performance ===
| Chart (1958) | Peak position |
|---|---|
| Austrian Singles Chart | 18 |
| Canadian Singles Chart (CHUM) | 10 |
| Rhodesian Singles Chart (1968) | 12 |
| South African Singles Chart (1968) | 18 |
| UK Singles Chart | 18 |
| UK Singles Chart (1968) | 34 |
| US Billboard Hot 100 | 8 |

== Johnny Chester version ==
"Summertime Blues"

Single by Johnny Chester

from the album Wild and Warm
- B-side: "I Love Mary"
- Released: November 1962
- Genre: Rock and roll
- Length: 2:00
- Label: W&G
- Songwriters: Eddie Cochran; Jerry Capehart

Johnny Chester singles chronology
| "Let's Dance" (1962) | "Summertime Blues" (1962) | "Nick Nack Paddy Whack" (1963) |

Australian rock 'n' roll singer Johnny Chester cited Cochran as one of his idols and had used the track when rehearsing his first band in 1959. Chester released his cover version on W&G Records in 1962 and was backed on the recording by local instrumental group the Chessmen, with Bert Stacpool on piano, his brother Les Stacpool on guitar, Frank McMahon on bass guitar, and Graeme Trottman on drums. In December it peaked at No. 30 on the Kent Music Report.

== Hep Stars version ==
"Summertime Blues"

Single by the Hep Stars
- B-side: "If You Need Me"
- Released: March 1965
- Recorded: December 1964
- Studio: Borgarskolan, Stockholm
- Genre: Rock and roll; garage rock
- Length: 1:52
- Label: Olga
- Songwriters: Eddie Cochran; Jerry Capehart
- Producer: Åke Gerhard

The Hep Stars singles chronology
| "A Tribute to Buddy Holly" (1965) | "Summertime Blues" (1965) | "Farmer John" (1965) |

Swedish rock band Hep Stars recorded Summertime Blues as a single in late December 1964. It was a six-hour, consecutive session in which the Hep Stars recorded six tracks: "Summertime Blues", "A Tribute to Buddy Holly", "Farmer John", "If You Need Me", "Bird Dog" and "Donna". The sessions for these were the first professional recordings of keyboardist Benny Andersson, later of ABBA fame. Their manager, Åke Gerhard had booked the recording sessions, as cheaply as he possibly could get away with. He booked Borgarskolan in central Stockholm and quickly turned it into a makeshift recording studio. Andersson would later comment on the sessions:

It must have been one of the cheapest sessions in the history of recorded music, we put two microphones on the stage of the assembly hall in a school and then we just played

— Carl Magnus Palm, Bright Lights, Dark Shadows: The Real Story of ABBA

Of these tracks, only "A Tribute to Buddy Holly" was released as a single in February 1965. While that initially failed to chart, their increasing popularity was fueled by their March 23, 1965 appearance on Drop-In which quickly made "A Tribute to Buddy Holly" climb the charts. This prompted Gerhard and his record label Olga Records to quickly issue "Summertime Blues" "Farmer John" and "Cadillac" as singles in late March 1965. While "Farmer John", "Cadillac" and "A Tribute to Buddy Holly" peaked at number 1, 2 and 4 at the same time on Tio i Topp, "Summertime Blues" missed the charts altogether. This was most likely due to the fact that guitarist Janne Frisk provided lead vocals on the track, as opposed to Svenne Hedlund singing it. "Summertime Blues" and "A Tribute to Buddy Holly" became the Hep Stars only singles to feature Frisk on lead vocals.

While not issued on any album at the time, it, along with the B-Side were issued as bonus material on the 1996 remaster of their debut album We and Our Cadillac.

=== Personnel ===
- Janne Frisk – guitar, lead vocals
- Christer Pettersson – drums
- Benny Andersson – keyboards, piano
- Lennart Hegland – bass guitar

== Blue Cheer version ==
"Summertime Blues"
- Netherlands single picture sleeve, 1968

Single by Blue Cheer

from the album Vincebus Eruptum
- B-side: "Out of Focus"
- Released: January 23, 1968
- Recorded: 1967
- Genre: Hard rock; heavy metal
- Length: 3:43
- Label: Philips
- Songwriters: Eddie Cochran; Jerry Capehart
- Producer: Abe "Voco" Kesh

Blue Cheer singles chronology
| "Summertime Blues" (1968) | "Just a Little Bit" (1968) |

The American rock band Blue Cheer recorded their version of "Summertime Blues" in 1967 and included it on their 1968 release entitled Vincebus Eruptum. The single peaked at number 14 on the Billboard Hot 100, pushing the sales of the album even higher to number 11. It topped the Dutch charts for one week in 1968. This version was ranked number 73 on the list of "The 100 Greatest Guitar Songs of All Time" of Rolling Stone.

=== Weekly charts ===
| Chart (1968) | Peak position |
|---|---|
| Canadian Singles Chart | 3 |
| Netherlands (Dutch Top 40) | 1 |
| Netherlands (Single Top 100) | 2 |
| US Billboard Hot 100 | 14 |

=== Year-end charts ===
| Chart (1968) | Rank |
|---|---|
| Netherlands (Dutch Top 40) | 21 |

== The Who version ==
"Summertime Blues"
- German single picture sleeve, 1970

Single by the Who

from the album Live at Leeds
- B-side: "Heaven and Hell"
- Released: June 1970
- Recorded: February 14, 1970
- Venue: University of Leeds Refectory (Leeds)
- Genre: Hard rock
- Length: 3:22
- Label: Track (UK); Decca (US)
- Songwriters: Eddie Cochran; Jerry Capehart
- Producer: The Who

The Who singles chronology
| "The Seeker" (1970) | "Summertime Blues" (1970) | "See Me, Feel Me" (1970) |

The Who played "Summertime Blues" as a staple of their concerts from their early days up to 1976, with intermittent appearances thereafter. It has not been played since the death of bassist John Entwistle in 2002. It was performed during the 1967 US tour, from which the first known Who recordings of the song were made, including a June 1967 date at the Monterey Pop Festival.

The first version to be released by the Who appeared on the 1970 album Live at Leeds. The single from this album peaked at number 38 in the UK and number 27 in the US. "I'm a big fan of 'Summertime Blues' on that album," remarked Rush bassist Geddy Lee, "which we covered [see below] to a large degree because of their version."

This version by the Who differed from the original in both the sense of aggression and volume. As lead singer Roger Daltrey noted, "We'd taken the song from being in kind of a swing rhythm on the off-beat to a rock rhythm on the one." Entwistle would sing the bass parts on the song, but the band struggled to capture the same energy of it in the studio. The live version recorded at the Leeds show managed to capture this fully.

=== Studio version ===
The Who recorded at least two studio versions of this track in 1967. They went unreleased until 1998 and 2009, when they appeared on the remastered CD of Odds & Sods and the deluxe edition of The Who Sell Out, respectively. Other live versions from the Who are featured in the Monterey Pop Festival CD box set and the concert and documentary film Woodstock (1970), as well as Live at the Isle of Wight Festival 1970 and the CD release of Live at the Royal Albert Hall.

=== Critical reception ===
Billboard magazine reviewed the song favorably, saying that the Who gave it a "wild updating" and was "certain to put them right up there at the top".

=== Chart performance ===
| Chart (1970) | Peak position |
|---|---|
| Canadian RPM Top Singles | 8 |
| Dutch Singles Chart | 25 |
| UK Singles Chart | 38 |
| US Billboard Hot 100 | 27 |

== Buck Owens version ==
"Summertime Blues"

Song by Buck Owens

from the album Hot Dog!
- Released: November 16, 1988
- Recorded: Late 1988
- Studio: Maximus Studio
- Genre: Country; rockabilly
- Length: 2:33
- Label: Capitol
- Songwriters: Eddie Cochran; Jerry Capehart
- Producer: Jim Shaw

In 1988, Country singer Buck Owens released a cover version of the song for his comeback album "Hot Dog!", released in November that year, produced by Jim Shaw. In said album, Owens resurrected the rockabilly sound of his earlier works. The album also featured a cover of another rock and roll classic, "Memphis, Tennessee" by Chuck Berry (Owens's version titled as, "Memphis", a common shortened title of the latter song). Though not released as a single nor charted, This cover version would later inspire Alan Jackson's country version in 1994 as noted by Jackson, a hit in the country charts in the US and Canada that year.

== Alan Jackson version ==
"Summertime Blues"

Single by Alan Jackson

from the album Who I Am
- B-side: "Hole in the Wall"
- Released: June 6, 1994
- Recorded: January 11, 1994
- Genre: Country
- Length: 3:11 (album version)
- Label: Arista Nashville
- Songwriters: Eddie Cochran; Jerry Capehart
- Producer: Keith Stegall

Alan Jackson singles chronology
| "(Who Says) You Can't Have It All" (1994) | "Summertime Blues" (1994) | "Livin' on Love" (1994) |

American country music artist Alan Jackson recorded the song for his 1994 album, Who I Am. It was released in June 1994 as the lead single from the album and the song reached Number One on the U.S. Billboard Hot Country Singles & Tracks chart and number 4 on the Bubbling Under Hot 100 (equivalent to number 104 on the Billboard Hot 100). Jackson said that he was inspired by Buck Owens' version.

=== Critical reception ===
Deborah Evans Price of Billboard magazine reviewed the song favorably, saying that Jackson "gives the oft-covered Eddie Cochran oldie the full, twangy 'Chattahoochee' treatment". She goes on to say that "until the vocal starts, you may not know which song you're listening to. But who cares?" She says that with his "signature laid-back vocal style, the long, tall Georgian turns this '50s teen anthem into a '90s country classic". Kevin John Coyne of Country Universe reviewed the song unfavorably, saying that Jackson blatantly attempted to recreate the "Chattahoochee" phenomenon. He goes on to say that the "charm of the Eddie Cochran original is lost by forcing those country line-dance beats into the backing track".

=== Music video ===
The video was directed by Michael Salomon and was released in June 1994. Considered by Jackson as the "sequel" to his "Chattahoochee" video a year earlier, it was also the only video of his that Salomon directed. It begins with a shot of him water-skiing (which ends the "Chattahoochee" video) before transitioning to him and a band performing the song while seated in the bed of a pickup. Many 4-wheelers, ATVs and a limo full of middle-aged farmers are seen riding through the mud and getting stuck. Jackson, in a plain white t-shirt, is seen riding around in the mud in his pickup before getting out and walking in between many people fighting in the mud. However, he stays stainless until the very end, where he only gets one small spot of mud on the left side of his shirt before finally joining in the tussle. It ends with Jackson posing as a scarecrow.

=== Chart positions ===
"Summertime Blues" debuted at number 53 on the US Billboard Hot Country Singles & Tracks for the week of June 18, 1994.

| Chart (1994) | Peak position |
|---|---|
| Canada Country Singles (RPM) | 1 |
| US Bubbling Under Hot 100 (Billboard) | 4 |
| US Hot Country Songs (Billboard) | 1 |

=== Year-end charts ===
| Chart (1994) | Position |
|---|---|
| Canada Country Tracks (RPM) | 3 |
| US Country Songs (Billboard) | 7 |

=== Certifications ===
Certifications for Summertime Blues
| Region | Certification | Certified units/sales |
|---|---|---|
| United States (RIAA) | Platinum | 1,000,000^{‡} |
^{‡} Sales+streaming figures based on certification alone.

== Rush version ==
"Summertime Blues"

Single by Rush

from the album Feedback
- Released: May 21, 2004
- Genre: Hard rock
- Length: 3:43
- Label: Anthem (Canada); Anthem/Atlantic
- Songwriters: Eddie Cochran; Jerry Capehart
- Producers: David Leonard; Rush

Rush singles chronology
| "Secret Touch" (2002) | "Summertime Blues" (2004) | "Far Cry" (2007) |

Canadian rock band Rush released their cover as a single on May 21, 2004. It was later included on their cover EP Feedback, released on June 29. The song was the theme for the WWE SummerSlam event on August 15, 2004. The song was performed live during the band's 30th anniversary tour later that year, and was included on the R30: 30th Anniversary World Tour concert DVD. The fourth line of each verse is omitted.

=== Chart positions ===
| Chart (2004) | Peak position |
|---|---|
| Canada Rock Top 30 (Radio & Records) | 12 |
| US Mainstream Rock Airplay (Billboard) | 30 |

=== Personnel ===
- Geddy Lee – lead vocals, bass
- Alex Lifeson – guitar
- Neil Peart – drums, percussion

== Johnny Hallyday version (in French) ==
"La Fille de l'été dernier"

Single by Johnny Hallyday

from the album Rock à Memphis
- Language: French
- English title: Last Summer's Girl
- B-side: "Dégage"
- Released: April 14, 1975
- Recorded: Early 1975
- Genre: Rock
- Length: 2:21
- Label: Philips
- Songwriters: Eddie Cochran; Jerry Capehart; Long Chris
- Producer: Lee Hallyday

Johnny Hallyday singles chronology
| "À propos de mon père" (1975) | "La Fille de l'été dernier" (1975) | "La Terre promise" (1975) |

Music video
- "La Fille de l'été dernier" (INA archive, 1975) on YouTube

The song was covered in French by Johnny Hallyday. His version (titled "La Fille de l'été dernier", meaning "Last Summer's Girl") was released on Philips Records (the same label that released Blue Cheer's version) in April 1975 for Hallyday's nineteenth studio album "Rock à Memphis", released one month later and spent one week at no. 1 on the singles sales chart in France (from May 10 to 16, 1975). Hallyday had previously recorded an adaption of another one of Cochran's songs, "Cut Across Shorty" (the last song the former had ever recorded before his death) in 1968 as "Cours plus vite Charlie" ("Run faster Charlie"), with Also adapted into French by Long Chris. The single is backed by a French adaption of the Larry Williams song, "Slow Down", titled "Dégage" (meaning "Cleared")

=== Charts ===
| Chart (1975) | Peak position |
|---|---|
| France (singles sales) | 1 |

== Other covers ==
- 1962, The Beach Boys, on Surfin' Safari
- 1978, The Flying Lizards, A-side on a single
