= Leigh Stephens =

American guitarist and songwriter

- Born: August 2, 1947 (age 79)
- Genres: Heavy metal, acid rock, garage rock, hard rock, blues rock, psychedelic rock
- Occupations: Musician, songwriter, guitarist
- Instrument: Guitar
- Years active: 1967–present

Leigh Stephens is an American guitarist and songwriter best known for being former lead guitarist of the San Francisco psychedelic rock group Blue Cheer.

== Blue Cheer ==
Leigh Stephens recorded two albums with the band, Vincebus Eruptum and Outsideinside. He has claimed to have been the only member of the band who did not use drugs. His replacement as Blue Cheer's lead guitarist was Randy Holden.

== After Blue Cheer ==
Red Weather, Stephens' debut solo album, was recorded in February 1969, the artwork was based on a Sutro Baths photo.

=== Silver Metre ===
"Silver Metre formed in Venice Beach and Santa Monica, California after my first trip to the United States at age 21...We recorded our first of a two-album deal with National General Records at Trident Studios, Wardour St, London. Our managers were Charlie Osborne, and later Tom Donahue who got us the deal...The money for our second album mysteriously disappeared...but I won’t go into that, other than to say it wasn’t the record companies fault."
—Pete Sears

Silver Metre, named after Ben Dixon's "The Silver Meter" from Along Came John, formed in 1969, evolving out of the Red Weather recording sessions, with Micky Waller (drummer), just fired from the Jeff Beck Group, Stephens, Pete Sears, and Jack Reynolds (singer). They recorded one album at Trident Studios in London, England, released on National General Records, produced by their manager, FM rock radio pioneer Tom Donahue. Contributing music and lyrics included Andrew Lloyd Webber, Tim Rice, Elton John, Bernie Taupin, Leigh Stephens, Pete Sears, and Tom Coman.

=== Pilot ===
Pilot was formed in 1971, with Mick Waller (drums), Leigh Stephens (electric guitar), Bruce Stephens (vocals, keyboards and guitar), Martin Quittenton (acoustic guitar), and Neville Whitehead (bass). Pilot only produced one, self-titled, album in 1972.

Stephens' 1971 album, And a Cast of Thousands featured his fellow band members from Pilot, the power trio Ashton, Gardner and Dyke, the two sax players from If, Dave Quincey, Dick Morrissey, and Jethro Tull bassist, Glenn Cornick.

Foxtrot, Stephens' next band, in 1974, with George Michalski (keyboards), Gary Richwine (bass, vocals), and David Beebe (drummer), signed and recorded an album for Motown Records, but was never released.

Chronic with a "K", Stephens' next band, in 1998, with Melissa Olsen (keyboards, vocals), Ron Stone (bass), and Ryan Goodpastor (drummer), released Ride the Thunder on ChroniCorp Records.

In 2004, High Strung/Low Key, Stephens' third solo album was self-released.

=== Graphic artist, 1990s ===
While still involved in the music scene in the early 1990s, Stephens also worked as a graphic artist and studio photographer. He designed automotive illustrations for the advertising and production of a mail order catalog company, ASAP, in Carson City, Nevada.

== Recognition ==
He was ranked number 98 on Rolling Stone magazine's list of the Top 100 Guitarists.

== Discography ==
=== With Blue Cheer ===
Albums

- Vincebus Eruptum (1968)
- Outsideinside (1968)
- The '67 Demos (Demo, 2018; BeatRocket)

Live

- Live & Unreleased, Vol. 1: '68/'74 (1996; Captain Trip Records)
- Live & Unreleased, Vol. 2: Live at San Jose Civic Centre, 1968 & More (1998; Captain Trip Records)

Singles

- "Summertime Blues" b/w "Out Of Focus" (From the album Vincebus Eruptum)
- "Just a Little Bit" b/w "Gypsy Ball"
- "Feathers From Your Tree" b/w "Sun Cycle" (From the album Outsideinside)
- "The Hunter" b/w "Come And Get It" (From the album Outsideinside)

=== With Silver Metre ===
Albums

- Silver Metre (1969)

Singles

- "Superstar" b/w "Now They've Found Me"

=== With Pilot ===
Albums

- Pilot (1972)

Singles

- "Rider" (Promo, Stereo/Mono)

=== Solo ===
Albums

- Red Weather (1969, Philips)
- ...and a Cast of Thousands (1971, Charisma)
- Chronic With a K – Ride The Thunder (1999, Chronicorp)
- High Strung Low Key (2004, Self-Released)
- A Rocket Down Falcon Street (2013, Self-Released)

Singles

- "Saki Zwadoo" b/w "Red Weather"
