= Paul Whaley =

American drummer (1947–2019)

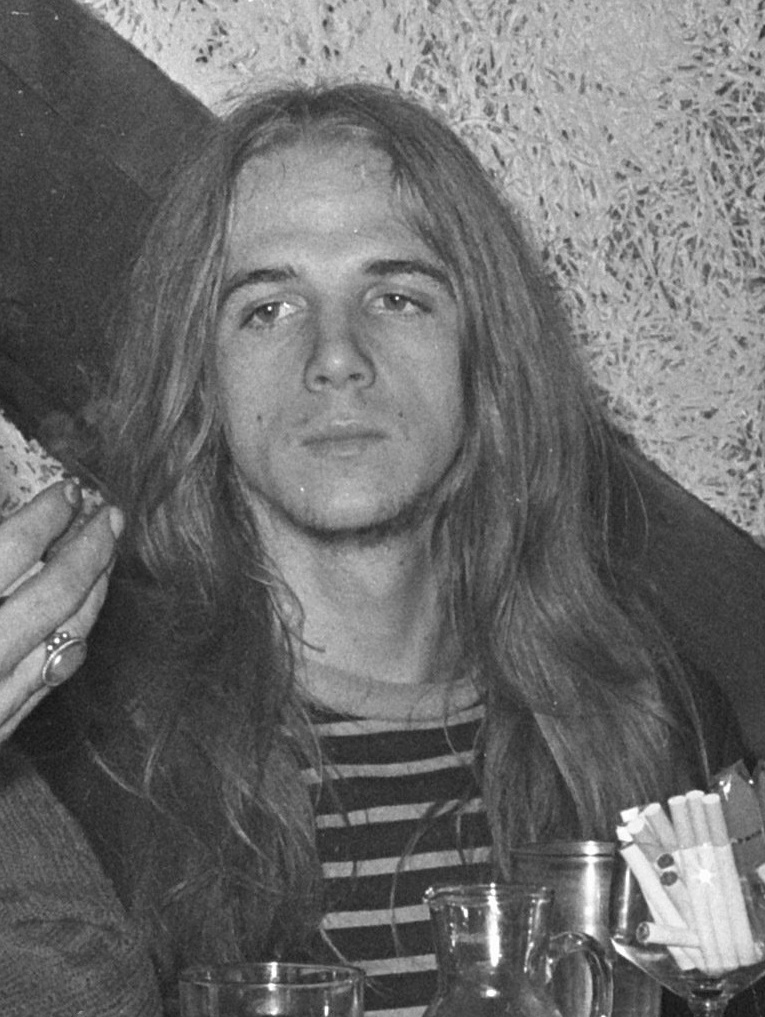
- Whaley in 1968

Background information
- Born: January 14, 1947; Albany, California, U.S.
- Died: January 28, 2019 (aged 72) Regensburg, Germany
- Genres: Heavy metal, blues rock, hard rock, acid rock, psychedelic rock
- Occupation: Drummer
- Formerly of: Blue Cheer, The Oxford Circle

Paul Gene Whaley (January 14, 1947 – January 28, 2019) was an American drummer best known as the drummer for rock band Blue Cheer. He was the son of country music singer Paul Edward Whaley. He grew up in the towns of Vallejo and Winters, California. He played drums with a Davis, California band called the Oxford Circle. Whaley is credited on the Oxford Circle album Live at the Avalon 1966. When he left the Oxford Circle to join Blue Cheer in 1967, the former band dissolved. He was the longest-standing member in Blue Cheer following Peterson's death at age 63. Whaley died of heart failure on January 28, 2019, two weeks after his 72nd birthday.

== Discography ==
=== With Oxford Circle ===
Singles

- "Foolish Woman/Mind Destruction" (World United 002, January 1966)

Albums

- "Nuggets from California: Live at the Avalon" 1966 (Big Beat, 1997)

=== With Blue Cheer ===
Singles

- "Summertime Blues" b/w "Out Of Focus" (From the album Vincebus Eruptum)
- "Just a Little Bit" b/w "Gypsy Ball" (From the album Vincebus Eruptum)
- "Feathers From Your Tree" b/w "Sun Cycle" (From the album Outsideinside)
- "The Hunter" b/w "Come And Get It" (From the album Outsideinside)

Albums

- Vincebus Eruptum (1968)
- Outsideinside (1968)
- New! Improved! (1969)
- The Beast Is Back (1984)
- Highlights and Lowlives (1990)
- Dining with the Sharks (1991)
- What Doesn't Kill You... (2007)
- 7 (Finish in 1979) (2012; ShroomAngel Records)
- The '67 Demos (Demo, 2018; BeatRocket)

Live

- Blitzkrieg Over Nüremberg (1989; Thunderbolt/Nibelung Records)
- Live & Unreleased, Vol. 1: '68/'74 (1996; Captain Trip Records)
- Live & Unreleased, Vol. 2: Live at San Jose Civic Centre, 1968 & More (1998; Captain Trip Records)
- Hello Tokyo, Bye Bye Osaka – Live in Japan 1999 (1999)
- Rocks Europe CD/DVD, 2009; Rainman/Captain Trip Records)
- Live at Anti WAA Festival 1989 CD/DVD, (2014; Nibelung Records)
- Party Hard at the Underground Cologne (online only, 2017; Nibelung Records)
- Three Giants, One Tour - Live in Germany in 1992 (online only, 2022; Nibelung Records)
- Live Bootleg: London – Hamburg (official bootleg, 2005; Rockview Records)
