= Blue Cheer =

American rock band

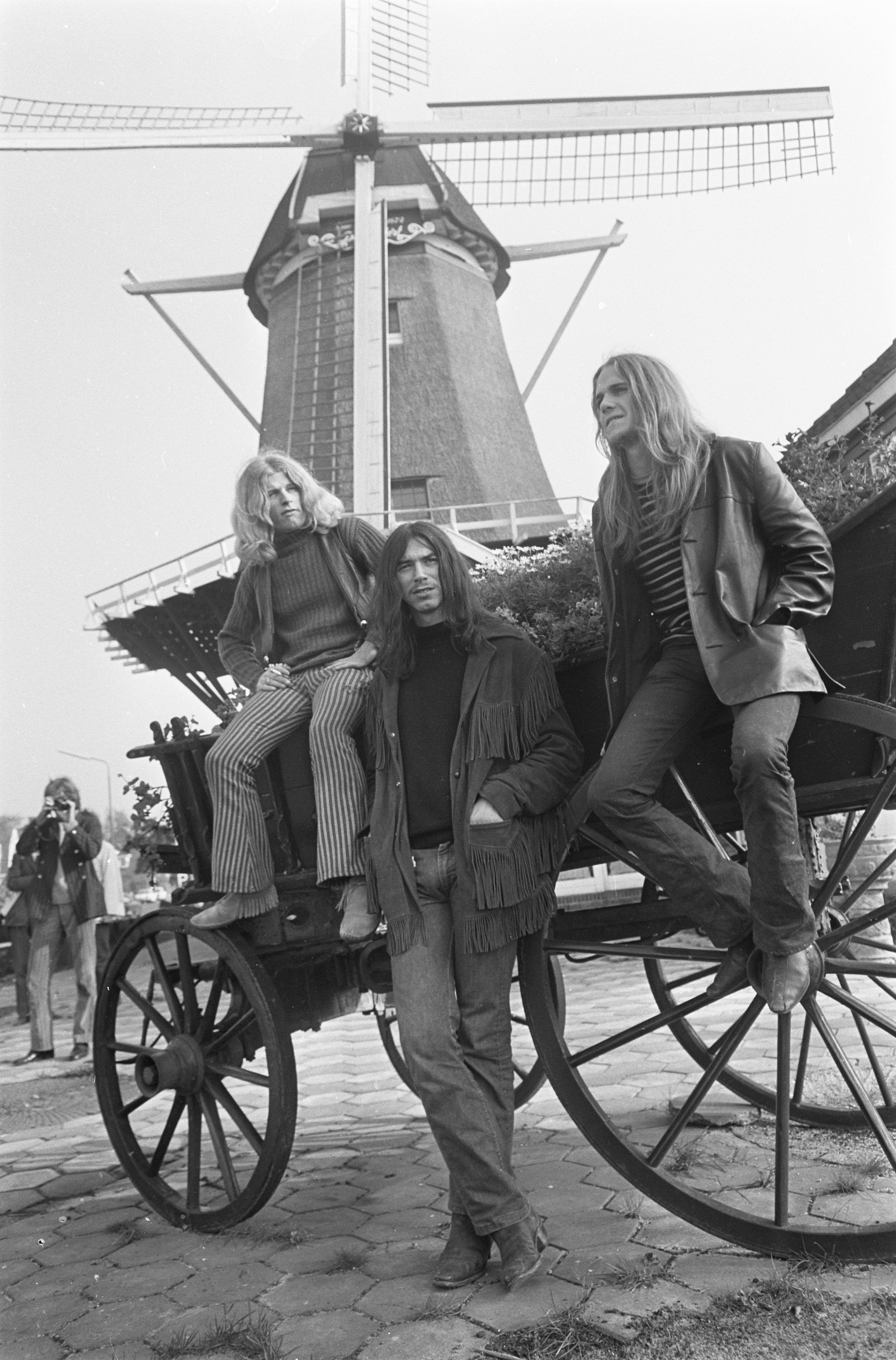
- From left to right: Dickie Peterson, Randy Holden, and Paul Whaley in 1968

Background information
- Origin: San Francisco, California, U.S.
- Genres: Hard rock; psychedelic rock; blues rock; acid rock; heavy metal; proto-punk; stoner rock; experimental rock
- Years active: 1966–1975; 1978–1979; 1984–1994; 1999–2009
- Label: Philips
- Past members: See list of members

Blue Cheer was an American rock band that initially performed and recorded in the late 1960s and early 1970s and was sporadically active until 2009. Based in San Francisco, Blue Cheer played in a psychedelic blues rock or acid rock style. They are also credited as being some of the earliest pioneers of heavy metal, with their cover of "Summertime Blues" sometimes cited as the first in the genre. They have also been noted as influential in the development of genres as disparate as stoner rock, experimental rock, and grunge.

== History ==
=== Main career (1966–1971) ===
Blue Cheer was formed in 1966 by Dickie Peterson. Peterson had previously been with the Davis-based band the Oxford Circle along with future Blue Cheer members Paul Whaley and Gary Lee Yoder. The original Blue Cheer personnel were singer/bassist Peterson, guitarist Leigh Stephens and Eric Albronda as drummer. Albronda was later replaced by Whaley, who was joined by Peterson's brother Jerre (guitar), Vale Hamanaka (keyboards), and Jere Whiting (vocals, harmonica). Albronda continued his association with Blue Cheer as a member of Blue Cheer management, as well as being the producer or co-producer of five Blue Cheer albums.

The band was managed by Allen "Gut" Terk, a former member of the Hells Angels. Early on, it was decided that the line-up should be trimmed down. It has been said that Blue Cheer decided to adopt a power trio configuration after seeing Jimi Hendrix perform at the Monterey Pop Festival. The Who performed a live version of "Summertime Blues" at the same festival. Hamanaka and Whiting were asked to leave. Jerre Peterson did not want to remain in the group without them, so he departed as well, leaving Peterson, Stephens and Whaley as a trio.

Their first hit was a cover version of Eddie Cochran's "Summertime Blues" from their debut album Vincebus Eruptum (1968). The single peaked at No. 14 on the Billboard Hot 100 chart, their only such hit, and the album peaked at No. 11 on the Billboard 200 chart. In Canada, the song peaked at No. 3 on the RPM Magazine chart.

The "Summertime Blues" single was backed with Dickie Peterson's original song "Out Of Focus". Peterson also contributed to the album the eight-minute "Doctor Please" and "Second Time Around", which features Paul Whaley's frantic drum solo. Filling out the record, the band cranked out blues covers "Rock Me Baby" (by B.B. King) and "Parchman Farm" (Mose Allison, but retitled "Parchment Farm").

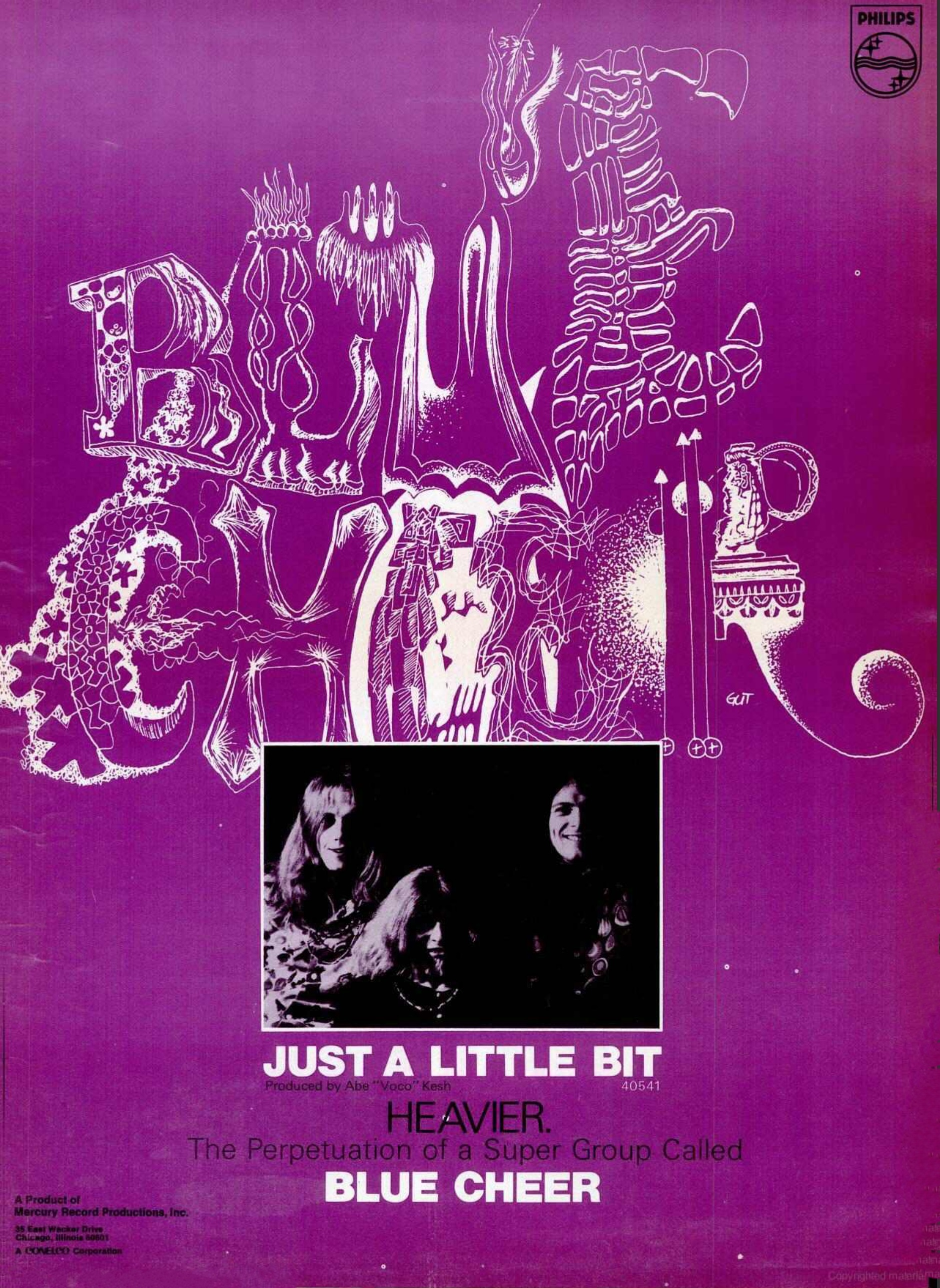
Billboard advertisement, June 15, 1968

The group underwent several personnel changes, the first occurring after the 1968 release of Outsideinside after Leigh Stephens – who never used drugs – was asked to leave the band after criticizing his bandmates' behaviour. He was replaced by Randy Holden, formerly of Los Angeles garage rock band the Other Half. On 1969's New! Improved! there were different guitarists on side 1 and side 2 (Randy Holden and Bruce Stephens) due to Holden's unanticipated departure from the band. Following Holden's departure the band's line-up initially consisted of Dickie Peterson (bass), Tom Weisser (guitar), and Mitch Mitchell (drums), before Whaley returned and Bruce Stephens joined the band. Later, Ralph Burns Kellogg joined the band on keyboards. Blue Cheer's style now changed to a more commercial hard rock sound à la Steppenwolf or Iron Butterfly. By the fourth album, Blue Cheer, Paul Whaley had left the band and had been replaced by Norman Mayell, and following the release of the fourth album Bruce Stephens also left the band and was succeeded by Gary Lee Yoder who helped complete the album.

According to Peterson, the group's lifestyle during this period caused problems with the music industry and press. Peterson said the group was outraged by the Vietnam War and society in general.

The new line-up of Peterson, Kellogg, Mayell and Yoder in 1970 saw the release of The Original Human Being, followed by 1971's Oh! Pleasant Hope. When the latter album failed to dent the sales charts, Blue Cheer temporarily split up in 1971.

=== 1974–1975 and 1978–1979 reunions ===
In 1974, Blue Cheer reformed under the name “Peterbilt,” with Dickie Peterson and brother Jerre Peterson as founding members and three guitars in the band's lineup. Peterbilt played club appearances in Sacramento January 10–12. By May of that year, they had switched the name back to "Blue Cheer" and the Petersons were co-writing new songs and slowly attracting more bookings. The band played an outdoor festival in San Juan Capistrano July 5.

In December 1974, Blue Cheer played a Christmas festival at The Greek Theatre in Los Angeles on December 22 alongside Van Halen, Judee Sill, The Coasters and Art Laboe's Band, followed by a three-night run of appearances at The Whisky a Go Go from December 23 to December 25.

In 1974, Kim Fowley produced an album for Blue Cheer, with sometime Steppenwolf member Nick St. Nicholas co-producing. The lineup included the Peterson brothers on bass and guitar, along with ex-Hollywood Stars members Ruben De Fuentes on guitar and Terry Rae on drums. Although the album was never released, six tracks from this period were released on the Captain Trip Records album Live and Unreleased '68/'74 (1996).

Dickie Peterson left the band in 1975 with Nick St. Nicholas replacing him on bass/vocals, leaving the band with no original members for some shows. The band played Laguna Beach Winter Festival February 15 of that year.

In 1978, Dickie Peterson began rehearsing with Davis-based guitarist Tony Rainier, a younger brother of Peterson's high school friend (and sometime Blue Cheer soundman and bodyguard) Larry Rainier. Michael Fleck was auditioned as drummer. The reformed Blue Cheer recorded an album with Jim Keylor at Army Street Studios. The album was initially unreleased, but received an official release in 2012 by ShroomAngel Records as Blue Cheer 7. The band embarked on a US tour in 1978–1979 with setlists that featured tracks from the first two Blue Cheer albums, and then returned to a period of inactivity after the tour completed.

=== Further reconfigurations, relocation to Germany, second and third extended hiatus (1980s–1998) ===
Blue Cheer was once again inactive in the early 1980s. There was another attempt to reunite in 1983, but that fell through. In 1984, Peterson had better luck when he returned with Whaley and Rainier as Blue Cheer and a brand new album The Beast Is Back, which was released on the New York label Megaforce Records. Whaley left again in 1985 as drummer Brent Harknett took over, only to be succeeded by Billy Carmassi in 1987. That same year, Dickie led yet another new lineup of the Cheer that had Ruben De Fuentes back on guitar and Eric Davis on drums. In 1988, the line-up changed once again, being now composed of Dickie Peterson (bass), with Andrew "Duck" MacDonald (guitar) and Dave Salce (drums).

From 1989 to 1993, Blue Cheer toured mainly in Europe. During this time, they played with classic rock acts as well as then-up-and-coming bands: Mountain, Outlaws, Thunder, The Groundhogs, Ten Years After, Mucky Pup, Biohazard and others.

1989 saw the release of Blue Cheer's first official live album, Blitzkrieg over Nüremberg. This album was recorded during Blue Cheer's first European tour in decades.

1990 saw the release of the Highlights and Lowlives studio album, composed of blues-based heavy metal and one ballad. The album was co-produced by notable grunge producer Jack Endino and producer Roland Hofmann. The line-up was Peterson, Whaley on drums and MacDonald on guitars.

Blue Cheer followed up Highlights and Lowlives with the much heavier Dining with the Sharks. Duck MacDonald was replaced by German ex-Monsters guitar player Dieter Saller in 1990. Also featured is a special guest appearance by Groundhogs guitarist Tony McPhee. The album was co-produced by Roland Hofmann and Blue Cheer. Gary Holland (ex-Dokken/Great White/Britton replaced Whaley on drums in 1993.

In the early 1990s, Peterson and Whaley re-located to Germany. In 1992, Peterson recorded his first solo album, Child of the Darkness, in Cologne with a band named "The Scrap Yard". The album appeared five years later in Japan on Captain Trip Records. After Peterson came back to the U.S. in 1994, Blue Cheer was dormant from 1994 to 1999.

=== The return of Blue Cheer (1999–2009) ===
In 1999, Peterson and Whaley got together with guitarist MacDonald to resume touring as Blue Cheer. This band configuration remained largely constant from 1999 until Peterson's death in 2009.

In 2000, Blue Cheer was the subject of a tribute album, Blue Explosion – A Tribute to Blue Cheer, featuring such bands as Pentagram, Internal Void, Hogwash and Thumlock.

Peterson and Leigh Stephens were together once again in Blue Cheer with drummer Prairie Prince at the Chet Helms Memorial Tribal Stomp in San Francisco's Golden Gate Park on October 29, 2005, and their lively performance drew old rockers like Paul Kantner and others from backstage to observe. They did some recordings in Virginia in Winter 2005 with Joe Hasselvander of Raven and Pentagram on drums, due to Paul Whaley choosing to remain in Germany. While Hasselvander played on the entire album, his contribution was reduced to drums on five songs, with Paul Whaley re-recording the drum parts on the balance of the album. This was because Whaley was set to rejoin the band and it was felt that he should contribute to the album, prior to touring. The resulting CD, What Doesn't Kill You..., released in 2007, features contributions from both Whaley and Hasselvander as a consequence.

Blue Cheer's video for "Summertime Blues" made an appearance in 2005 documentary Metal: A Headbanger's Journey, where Geddy Lee of Rush referred to the group as one of the first heavy metal bands.

=== Death of Peterson and disbandment (2009) ===
Peterson died on October 12, 2009, in Germany from prostate cancer. Peterson was actually 63 at the time of his death despite some initial confusion, as exemplified here, immediately following the announcement of his death. After Peterson's death, long-time Blue Cheer guitarist Andrew MacDonald wrote on the group's website that "Blue Cheer is done. Out of respect for Dickie, Blue Cheer [will] never become a viable touring band again." Drummer Paul Whaley died of heart failure in January 2019.

=== Dispute over ownership of band name ===
In recent years, a dispute has arisen as to ownership of the Blue Cheer band name. It was reported that, as of the early 2000s (decade), former Blue Cheer guitarist Randy Holden, assisted by Randy Pratt of The Lizards band, had trademarked the Blue Cheer band name. Holden's association with Blue Cheer was quite brief; his only recorded output with the band is three tracks on New! Improved! from 1969. The matter had upset Dickie Peterson, given his position as a co-founder of the band and the only continuing member since its inception, but does not appear to have been resolved.

According to Randy Pratt, this report is not entirely accurate. Pratt provides uncited commentary as follows:

The Blue Cheer band name was trademarked in 2000 by fan and professional musician Randy Pratt. Pratt put the trademark in former Blue Cheer guitarist Randy Holden's possession after Dickie Peterson said he was finished with Blue Cheer and wanted nothing to do with it ever again, with his sole future interest in his new band, Mother Ocean.

== Legacy ==
Blue Cheer is often credited as one of the very earliest pioneers of heavy metal and their version of "Summertime Blues" has been cited as the first heavy metal song. Frontman Dickie Peterson recalled his first time hearing the term: "There was a guy in our road crew named Peter Wagner who referred to us as the "Heavy Metal Kids". But I think he did that because the Heavy Metal Kids were junkies in William Burroughs' books. I don't think he was talking about our music."

According to Tim Hills in his book, The Many Lives of the Crystal Ballroom, "Blue Cheer was the epitome of San Francisco psychedelia." Jim Morrison of The Doors characterized the group as "the single most powerful band I've ever seen" and Eric Clapton defined them as "probably the originators of heavy metal". Scott Asheton and James Williamson of The Stooges cited Blue Cheer as the first heavy metal band, with Scott remarking; "they had huge stacks of amps, they had the long hair, I think they were even banging their heads. They were I'd say the first thing I think you could call metal". Ron Asheton cited Blue Cheer as an inspiration for The Stooges loud volume approach, stating; "We opened up for Blue Cheer at the Grande Ballroom, and they were so loud it was painful, but we loved it... That was the only way we knew how to play". Blue Cheer influenced such late 1970s bands as Hungarian psychedelic hardcore band Galloping Coroners.

Blue Cheer was also widely recognized as the loudest band ever at the time when they emerged. Billy Altman reported that at a 1968 concert the band was "So loud, in fact, that within just a few songs, much of the crowd in the front orchestra section was fleeing."

Various artists in the grunge movement have paid homage to Blue Cheer, including Melvins vocalist Buzz Osborne and Mudhoney vocalist Mark Arm, who said; "Hearing Blue Cheer [while in college] was almost as important to me as hearing the Stooges for the first time the year before. When Mudhoney started up, Blue Cheer was definitely part of our blueprint.”

"Blue Cheer" was the name of a variety of LSD made by chemist and Grateful Dead patron Owsley Stanley, and the band was probably named after that, although the name existed earlier, as the name of a laundry detergent, after which the LSD variety itself was named.

== Personnel ==
=== Members ===
- Dickie Peterson – bass, vocals (1967–1972, 1974–1975, 1978–1979, 1984–1994, 1999–2009; died 2009)
- Leigh Stephens – guitar (1967–1968, 2005)
- Paul Whaley – drums (1967–1969, 1969, 1984–1985, 1990–1993, 1999–2004, 2005–2009; died 2019)
- Eric Albronda – drums (1967)
- Jerre Peterson – guitar (1967, 1974–1975; died 2002)
- Vale Hamanaka – keyboards (1967)
- Jere Whiting – vocals, harmonica (1967)
- Randy Holden – guitar (1968–1969)
- Mitch Mitchell – drums (1969; died 2008)
- Tom Weisser – guitar (1969)
- Bruce Stephens – guitar, vocals (1969; died 2012)
- Ralph Burns Kellogg – keyboards, bass (1969–1972; died 2003)
- Norman Mayell – drums, guitar (1969–1972)
- Gary Lee Yoder – guitar, vocals (1969–1972; died 2021)
- Troy Spence Jr. – guitar (1972–1974)
- James L. Curry – drums (1972–1974)
- Ruben De Fuentes – guitar (1974–1975, 1987–1988)
- Terry Rae – drums (1974–1975)
- Nick St. Nicholas – bass, vocals (1975)
- Tony Rainier – guitar (1978–1979, 1984–1987; died 2025)
- Mike Fleck – drums (1978–1979)
- Brent Harknett – drums (1985–1987)
- Billy Carmassi – drums (1987)
- Eric Davis – drums (1987–1988)
- Andrew "Duck" MacDonald – guitar (1988–1990, 1999–2005, 2005–2009)
- David Salce – drums (1988–1990)
- Dieter Saller – guitar (1990–1994)
- Gary Holland – drums (1993–1994)
- Prairie Prince – drums (2005)
- Joe Hasselvander – drums (2004–2005, 2009)

=== Lineups ===
1967	1967	1967–1968	1968–1969
Eric Albronda – drums; Dickie Peterson – bass, vocals; Leigh Stephens – guitar	Dickie Peterson – bass, vocals; Leigh Stephens – guitar; Vale Hamanaka – keyboards; Jerre Peterson – guitar; Paul Whaley – drums; Jere Whiting – vocals, harmonica	Dickie Peterson – bass, vocals; Leigh Stephens – guitar; Paul Whaley – drums	Dickie Peterson – bass, vocals; Paul Whaley – drums; Randy Holden – guitar
1969	1969	1969	1969–1970
Dickie Peterson – bass, vocals; Mitch Mitchell – drums; Tom Weisser – guitar	Dickie Peterson – bass, vocals; Bruce Stephens – guitar, vocals; Paul Whaley – drums	Dickie Peterson – bass, vocals; Bruce Stephens – guitar, vocals; Paul Whaley – drums; Ralph Burns Kellogg – keyboards, bass	Dickie Peterson – bass, vocals; Bruce Stephens – guitar, vocals; Ralph Burns Kellogg – keyboards, bass; Norman Mayell – drums, guitar
1970–1972	1972–1974	1974–1975	1975
Dickie Peterson – bass, vocals; Ralph Burns Kellogg – keyboards, bass; Norman Mayell – drums, guitar; Gary Lee Yoder – guitar, vocals	Dickie Peterson – bass; Jerre Peterson – guitar; Troy Spence Jr. – guitar; James L. Curry – drums	Dickie Peterson – bass, vocals; Ruben De Fuentes – guitar; Jerre Peterson – guitar; Terry Rae – drums	Ruben De Fuentes – guitar; Jerre Peterson – guitar; Terry Rae – drums; Nick St. Nicholas – bass, vocals
1975–1978	1978–1979	1979–1984	1984–1985
Disbanded	Dickie Peterson – bass, vocals; Mike Fleck – drums; Tony Rainier – guitar	Disbanded	Dickie Peterson – bass, vocals; Tony Rainier – guitar; Paul Whaley – drums
1985–1987	1987	1987–1988	1988–1990
Dickie Peterson – bass, vocals; Tony Rainier – guitar; Brent Harknett – drums	Dickie Peterson – bass, vocals; Tony Rainier – guitar; Billy Carmassi – drums	Dickie Peterson – bass, vocals; Eric Davis – drums; Ruben De Fuentes – guitar	Dickie Peterson – bass, vocals; Andrew "Duck" MacDonald – guitar; David Salce – drums
1990	1990–1993	1993–1994	1994–1999
Dickie Peterson – bass, vocals; Andrew "Duck" MacDonald – guitar; Paul Whaley – drums	Dickie Peterson – bass, vocals; Paul Whaley – drums; Dieter Saller – guitar	Dickie Peterson – bass, vocals; Dieter Saller – guitar; Gary Holland – drums	Disbanded
1999–2005	2005	2005	2005–2009
Dickie Peterson – bass, vocals; Andrew "Duck" MacDonald – guitar; Paul Whaley – drums	Dickie Peterson – bass, vocals; Leigh Stephens – guitar; Prairie Prince – drums	Dickie Peterson – bass, vocals; Andrew "Duck" MacDonald – guitar; Joe Hasselvander – drums	Dickie Peterson – bass, vocals; Andrew "Duck" MacDonald – guitar; Paul Whaley – drums

== Discography ==
=== Studio albums ===
Title	Year	US Top 200
Vincebus Eruptum	1968	11
Outsideinside	1968	90
New! Improved!	1969	84
Blue Cheer	1969	—
The Original Human Being	1970	188
Oh! Pleasant Hope	1971	—
The Beast Is Back	1984	—
Highlights and Lowlives	1990	—
Dining with the Sharks	1991	—
What Doesn't Kill You...	2007	—

=== Singles ===
Year	Title	Peak chart positions		Album
Year	Title	CAN	US	Album
1968	"Summertime Blues" b/w "Out of Focus"	3	14	Vincebus Eruptum
1968	"Just a Little Bit" b/w "Gypsy Ball""	69	92	Outsideinside
1968	"Feathers from Your Tree" b/w "Sun Cycle"	—	—	Outsideinside
1969	"The Hunter" b/w "Come and Get It"	—	—	Outsideinside
1969	"West Coast Child of Sunshine" b/w "When It All Gets Old"	—	—	New! Improved!
1969	"All Night Long" b/w "Fortunes"	—	—	non-album tracks*
1970	"Hello L.A., Bye-Bye Birmingham" b/w "Natural Man"	—	—	Blue Cheer*
1970	"Fool" b/w "Ain't That the Way"	—	—	Blue Cheer*
1970	"Pilot" b/w "Babaji (Twilight Raga)"	—	—	The Original Human Being
"—" denotes a recording that did not chart or was not released in that territory.

* The 2007 Japanese mini-LP sleeve reissue of Blue Cheer contains the mono non-LP single "All Night Long" b/w "Fortunes" along with the single versions of "Fool" and "Ain't That The Way" as bonus tracks.

=== Live ===
- Blitzkrieg Over Nüremberg (1989; Thunderbolt/Nibelung Records)
- Live & Unreleased, Vol. 1: '68/'74 (1996; Captain Trip Records)
- Live & Unreleased, Vol. 2: Live at San Jose Civic Centre, 1968 & More (1998; Captain Trip Records)
- Hello Tokyo, Bye Bye Osaka – Live in Japan 1999 (1999)
- Rocks Europe CD/DVD, 2009; Rainman/Captain Trip Records)
- Live at Anti Waa Festival 1989 CD/DVD, (2014; Nibelung Records)
- Party Hard at the Underground Cologne (online only, 2017; Nibelung Records)
- Three Giants, One Tour - Live in Germany in 1992 (online only, 2022; Nibelung Records)
- Live Bootleg: London – Hamburg (official bootleg, 2005; Rockview Records)

=== Other releases ===
- The Best Of Blue Cheer (1970; Philips)
- Motive (1982; Philips)
- Louder Than God: The Best Of Blue Cheer (1986; Rhino Records)
- The History Of Blue Cheer – Good Times Are So Hard To Find (1988; Mercury)
- Summertime Blues (compilation, 1990; PolyGram Special Products)
- Vincebus Eruptum + Outsideinside (2003; Track Record)
- Records Of Yesteryear (online only, 2005; Mercury)
- Blue Cheer Rollin' Dem Bones (EP, 2008; Rainman)
- 7 (2012; ShroomAngel Records)
- Beginnings (online only, 2017)
- The '67 Demos (demo, 2018; BeatRocket)
- Junk (2025; Flatiron Recordings)

== See also ==
- List of bands from the San Francisco Bay Area
- Cheer (brand)

== Sources ==
- Hughes, Tom (2006). Dimery, Robert (ed.). 1001 Albums You Must Hear Before You Die. Quintet Publishing Limited. ISBN 0-7893-1371-5.
- Buckley, Peter (2003). The Rough Guide to Rock. London: Rough Guides. ISBN 1-85828-201-2.
