= Ethan James (producer) =

American musician

Ethan James

Ralph Burns Kellogg (August 2, 1946 – June 19, 2003), also known as Ethan James, was an American musician, record producer, and recording engineer best known for his work on Minutemen's seminal album Double Nickels on the Dime. He also produced and engineered albums for Black Flag, The Bangles, Rain Parade, Dos, and many others. Many of these recordings were undertaken at Radio Tokyo Studio, the recording facility he founded in the early 1980s.

Under his real name, he was a member of the heavy metal band Blue Cheer from 1969 to 1972. He was considered a master of the hurdy-gurdy, a medieval instrument, and was also noted for playing the symphonium. James returned to performing in 1989 and performed with the San Francisco Mozart Festival Orchestra, among others.

James died of complications from liver cancer in San Francisco at the age of 56.

== Selected discography ==
- Mint Tattoo (Dot, 1969)
- Shaking Hands With Kafka (Moll Tonträger, 1993)
- What Rough Beast (Moll Tonträger, 1995)
- The Ancient Music Of Christmas (Hannibal Records, 1996)
- A Garden Of Hurdy-Gurdy Delights (Taqsim Records, 1997)
- Learning Chinese The Hard Way (Stonegarden Records, 2002)
