= Dickie Peterson =

American musician (1946–2009)

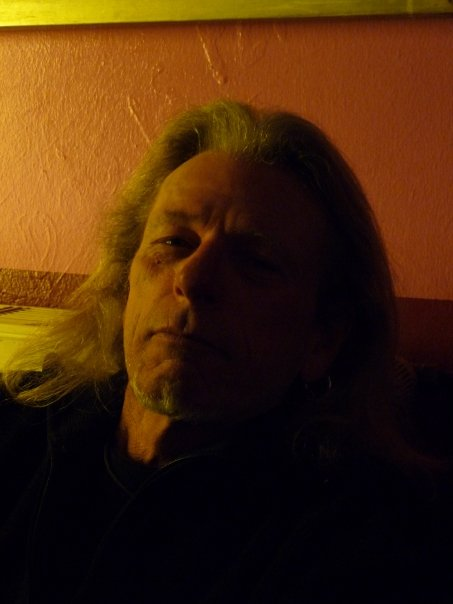
- Peterson in 2008

Background information
- Born: September 12, 1946; Grand Forks, North Dakota, U.S.
- Died: October 12, 2009 (aged 63) Erkelenz, Germany
- Genres: Blues rock, psychedelic rock, heavy metal
- Occupations: Musician, songwriter
- Instruments: Bass, vocals, guitar, drums
- Years active: 1966–2009

Richard Allan Peterson (September 12, 1946 – October 12, 2009) known as Dickie Peterson was an American musician, best known as the bassist, lead singer and only constant member of Blue Cheer. He also recorded two solo albums: Child of the Darkness and Tramp.

== Biography ==
Born in Grand Forks, North Dakota, Peterson played bass from the age of thirteen onward, and knew at the age of eight that he wanted to become a professional musician. He came from a musical family: his father played trombone, his mother played piano and his brother initially played flute. Drums were Peterson's first instrument.

Peterson spent much of his youth in East Grand Forks, Minnesota, the twin city to Grand Forks, North Dakota, where he was born. He attended Grand Forks Central High School from grade 10 through grade 12. His parents died when he was young, resulting in his living with his aunt and uncle on a farm in North Dakota, for part of his youth.

Peterson cited Otis Redding as a significant influence. He credited his brother, the late Jerre Peterson, as being his lifelong musical influence. Jerre was one of the lead guitarists in the initial lineup of Blue Cheer (the other being Leigh Stephens) and played with various formations of the band in later years.

Peterson spent much of the past two decades preceding his death based in Germany, playing with Blue Cheer and other groups on occasion. In 1998 and 1999, he played various dates in Germany with the Hank Davison Band and as an acoustic duo with Hank Davison under the name "Dos Hombres." He appeared on the album, Hank Davison and Friends - Real Live. In 2001 and 2002, Peterson played, principally in Germany, with Mother Ocean, a group he formed that included former Blue Cheer guitarist Tony Rainier, as well as brother Jerre Peterson.

Throughout his life, Peterson's relationship to music had been all-consuming. Peterson provided the following self-description: "I've been married twice, I’ve had numerous girlfriends, and they’ll all tell you that if I’m not playing music I am an animal to live with. … Music is a place where I get to deal with a lot of my emotion and displaced energy. I always only wanted to play music, and that’s all I still want to do."

In his early life, Peterson was a user of various drugs and was a heroin addict for a number of years. In 2007, Peterson said he believed LSD and other similar drugs can have positive effects, but that he and other members of Blue Cheer "took it over the top." He had ceased much of his drug use by the mid-1970s, and stopped drinking 10 years before his death.

Blue Cheer has been considered a pioneering band in many genres. Peterson did not consider that the band belonged to any particular genre: "People keep trying to say that we’re heavy metal or grunge or punk, or we’re this or that. The reality is, we’re just a power trio, and we play ultra blues, and it’s rock ‘n roll. It’s really simple what we do."

On October 12, 2009, Peterson died in Erkelenz, Germany, at the age of 63 from liver cancer, after prostate cancer spread throughout his body. He was survived by his second wife, his former wife, a daughter from his first marriage, and a six-year-old grandson.

Peterson was cremated and his ashes given to his daughter, Corrina. Peterson wished his ashes to be spread in the Rhine River in Germany and in the Redwoods of Northern California, at a site to be determined by his daughter.

Neil Peart, the drummer for Rush, said in tribute to Peterson:

Dickie Peterson was present at the creation — stood at the roaring heart of the creation, a primal scream through wild hair, bass hung low, in an aural apocalypse of defiant energy. His music left deafening echoes in a thousand other bands in the following decades, thrilling some, angering others, and disturbing everything — like art is supposed to do.

== Discography ==
- 1998: Child of the Darkness Captain Trip Records; released only in Japan
- 1999: Tramp Captain Trip Records; released only in Japan
