= 1966 in Nordic music =

The following is a list of notable events and compositions of the year 1966 in Nordic music.

== Events ==
- March – Birgit Nilsson doubles in the roles of Venus and Elisabeth in Wagner's Tannhäuser, at the Metropolitan Opera, opposite Pekka Nuotio.
- 5 March – The 11th Eurovision Song Contest is held in Luxembourg, and is won by Austria. Of the Scandinavian countries, Sweden finish 2nd, Norway 3rd, Finland 10th and Denmark 14th.
- 29-30 May The first Helsinki Folk Festival takes place, in Sandvik, Espoo, Finland, as a one-off event.
- unknown date – Nicolai Gedda is inducted into the Royal Swedish Academy of Music.

== New works ==
- Ulf Grahn – Symphony no 1
- Harald Sæverud – Symphony no 9
- Leif Segerstam – String Quartet no 4

== Popular music ==
- Benny Andersson
  - "Consolation" (#1 Sweden for Hep Stars)
  - "Sunny Girl" (#1 Sweden for Hep Stars)
- Benny Andersson and Svenne Hedlund – "Wedding" (#1 Sweden for Hep Stars)
- Tages – "In My Dreams" (#1 Sweden)

== New recordings ==
- Mozart's Die Entführung aus dem Serail, with Nicolai Gedda and Lucia Popp; (Belmonte) Vienna State Opera Chorus and Orchestra, Josef Krips, EMI
- Steinn Steinarr – Steinn Steinarr Les Eigin Ljóð (spoken word)

== Eurovision Song Contest ==
- Denmark in the Eurovision Song Contest 1966
- Finland in the Eurovision Song Contest 1966
- Norway in the Eurovision Song Contest 1966
- Sweden in the Eurovision Song Contest 1966

== Film music ==
- Lars Johan Werle – Ön

== Musical films ==
- Flagermusen, with music by Johann Strauss II

== Births ==
- 17 February – Quorthon, Swedish singer, songwriter, musician and record producer (died 2004)
- 16 April – Jarle Vespestad, Norwegian jazz drummer
- 15 September – Håvard Gimse, cellist.

== Deaths ==
- 6 February – Algot Haquinius, Swedish pianist and composer (born 1890)
- 18 March – Osvald Helmuth, Danish actor and singer (born 1894)
- 13 May – Henrik Adam Due, Norwegian violinist (born 1891)
- 9 August – Gösta Nystroem, Swedish composer (born 1890)
- 17 August – Rolf Billberg, Swedish jazz saxophonist (born 1930)

== See also ==
- 1966 in Denmark
- 1966 in Iceland
- 1966 in Norwegian music
- 1966 in Sweden
