= It's Been a Long Long Time (album) =

1968 Hep Stars album

Studio album by the Hep Stars
- Released: February 1968
- Recorded: 27 November − 11 December 1967
- Genres: Baroque pop; pop rock; psychedelic pop
- Length: 33:19
- Label: Cupol
- Producer: Steve Clark

The Hep Stars chronology
Jul med Hep Stars (1967)	It's Been a Long Long Time (1968)	Songs We Sang 68 (1968)

Singles from It's Been a Long Long Time
- 1. "It´s Been a Long Long Time" Released: February 1968; 2. "Musty Dusty" Released: February 1969 (U.S only)

It's Been a Long Long Time is the fourth studio album by Swedish band the Hep Stars, released by Cupol Records in February 1968. Intended to be their international breakthrough, it was recorded in London with session musicians, with the only members of the Hep Stars to appear on the album being lead singer Svenne Hedlund, keyboardist Benny Andersson and tour manager Lennart Fernholm.

The album failed to garner any major international attention, and It's Been a Long Long Time was never issued in the United States. The soft-rock album was the Hep Stars only release on the Cupol label, as opposed to both their previous and later albums which were released on Olga Records.

== Background and recording ==
By November 1967, the Hep Stars had achieved sixteen top-10 singles in Sweden, of which seven had peaked on the top of the chart. They were almost equally successful on Tio i Topp, where they had placed eleven songs, of which five had reached the top spot. Their success was not only limited to Sweden, as seven singles had also entered Norway's VG-lista. They had also released four albums prior (two studio albums and one live album, with Jul med Hep Stars being recorded in December 1967). However, outside of the Scandinavian countries, the Hep Stars were virtually unknown. They had made several attempts to breach the UK market with "Sunny Girl", however, bitterness between Olga Records and Decca Records successfully hindered a British career.

However, the chances of gaining an international career had started to appear once again. Richard Reese-Edwards approached the Hep Stars, certain of gaining them a successful international career. He managed to secure them a performance on the successful British television show Dee Time, which was hosted by Simon Dee, where the Hep Stars performed "It's Nice to Be Back", which had been issued as the B-side of "Malaika" earlier in April 1967. However, due to the rivalry between the record labels, "Malaika" was never issued in the United Kingdom as a result of this, meaning that the performance was rendered obsolete. Further attempts of international success led them to London. However, lead singer Svenne Hedlund, keyboardist Benny Andersson and tour manager Lennart Fernholm are the only Hep Stars members to appear on the recording, which was recorded between 27 November and 11 December 1967. Following their return to Stockholm, the band recorded Jul Med Hep Stars at Europafilm Studios and the Gustaf Vasa Church.

== Material and release ==
The material on the song falls mostly towards the baroque-pop category, with many songs having string and brass-arrangements. The songs have a broader sounds compared to previous albums. Unlike The Hep Stars, which featured several original compositions, It's Been a Long Long Time only features one original composition, that being its title track which was written by Benny Andersson and Lasse Berghagen, a newly formed songwriting duo. Most other material were written by either American or British songwriters, including the opening track "Enter the Young", which was originally recorded by The Association for their studio album And Then... Along Comes the Association. In fact, most songs on the albums were written by Curt Boettcher, who was the Association's producer, and collaborated with them on "Would You Like To Go".

It's Been a Long Long Time was released in February 1968 on Cupol records, and was coupled with the single release of its title track. "It's Been a Long Long Time" reached number 14 on Kvällstoppen, becoming one of their lowest charting singles. The album itself failed to chart in the UK, and was never released in the US. "Musty Dusty", which initially was the B-side of the title track, was issued as a single in the US in February 1969 on a smaller record label called Chartmaker Records in a vain attempt to make an international breakthrough. This single failed to chart on both the Billboard Hot 100 and the Cashbox top 100. The album was re-issued and remastered in 1996, coupling it with several singles released during the period, including "Sagan om Lilla Sofi", "Det Finns En Stad" and other tracks which were released on Songs We Sang 68.

== Track listing ==
Side one
No.	Title	Writer(s)	Length
1.	"Enter the Young"	Terry Kirkman	2:46
2.	"Hope"	Buddy Buie; John Rainey Adkins	2:21
3.	"5 A.M."	Sandy Salisbury	2:42
4.	"It's Time For a Change"	Spencer Proffer; Jeffrey Marmelzat	2:38
5.	"Changing Away From You"	John Bettis	3:00
6.	"It's Been a Long Long Time"	Benny Andersson; Lasse Berghagen	2:59
Total length:			16:26

Side one
No.	Title	Writer(s)	Length
1.	"Musty Dusty"	Curt Boettcher	3:14
2.	"Spinning, Spinning, Spinning"	Boettcher; Ruthann Friedman	2:10
3.	"There Is Love"	Jim Valley	2:32
4.	"Would You Like To Go"	Boettcher; Gary Alexander	2:32
5.	"It's Now Winter's Day"	Tommy Roe	3:11
6.	"Another Time"	Boettcher	3:14
Total length:			16:53

== Personnel ==
=== Hep Stars ===
- Svenne Hedlund – lead vocals
- Benny Andersson – keyboards, backing vocals
- Lennart Fernholm – bass guitar, backing vocals

=== Additional personnel ===
- Unidentified session musicians – guitars, drums, brass instruments, string instruments
- Michael Lee Henderson – arrangements
- George S. Whiteman – artwork
- Steve Clark – producer
