= Hawaii (The Beach Boys song) =

1963 song by The Beach Boys

Single by The Beach Boys

from the album Surfer Girl
- B-side: "The Rocking Surfer"
- Released: September 16, 1963
- Recorded: July 1963
- Genre: Surf rock; rock and roll
- Length: 1:59
- Label: Capitol
- Songwriters: Brian Wilson, Mike Love
- Producer: Brian Wilson

"Hawaii" is a song written by Brian Wilson and Mike Love for the American rock band the Beach Boys. It was recorded in July 1963 and released on their 1963 album Surfer Girl. It is one of the first Beach Boy songs that Hal Blaine played on, contributing timbales, but regular drummer Dennis Wilson still played. In January 1964, it was released as a single in Australia, becoming a top-10 hit. "Hawaii" made its way into the Beach Boys repertoire almost 50 years later.

== Chart performance ==
"Hawaii" was released in Australia as a single, where it was reported as number two by Cash Box, charting at that position in the surveys of the premier radio stations of both Sydney and Brisbane during the Beach Boys' tour of Australia in February 1964. It was tabulated as eleventh for Australia's end-of-year survey.

== Performers ==
The Beach Boys

- David Marks – harmony and backing vocals; rhythm guitar
- Mike Love – lead, harmony and backing vocals
- Brian Wilson – lead, harmony and backing vocals; piano
- Al Jardine – harmony and backing vocals, bass guitar
- Carl Wilson – harmony and backing vocals; lead guitar
- Dennis Wilson – harmony and backing vocals, drums
  Session musicians and production staff
  - Hal Blaine – timbales
  - Chuck Britz – sound engineer

== Other notable covers ==
=== Hep Stars version ===
"Hawaii"

Single by the Hep Stars
- A-side: "Sunny Girl"
- Released: March 1966
- Recorded: March 1966
- Studio: Europafilm Studios, Stockholm
- Genre: Surf rock
- Length: 1:30
- Label: Olga
- Songwriters: Wilson; Love
- Producer: Gert Palmcrantz

Hep Stars singles chronology
"Should I" (1965)	"Hawaii" (1966)	"Wedding" (1966)

Swedish rock group Hep Stars recorded "Hawaii" as the B-side to their 1966 single "Sunny Girl", one of the earliest Benny Andersson compositions. While "Sunny Girl" was a hit, reaching number 1 on both Kvällstoppen and Tio i Topp, "Hawaii", despite being issued as the B-side, managed to chart on Kvällstoppen due to the popularity of Hep Stars. It stayed on the chart for two weeks, peaking at number 7 on March 22, 1966. "Hawaii" was recorded by the group as a joke, in style with their debut single "Kana Kapila" and "Mashed Potatoes".

==== Personnel ====
- Svenne Hedlund – lead vocals
- Janne Frisk – harmony vocals, guitar
- Lennart Hegland – backing vocals
- Benny Andersson – tambourine, backing vocals
- Christer Pettersson – harmony vocals, drums

=== Charts ===
Chart (1966)	Peak position
Sweden (Kvällstoppen)	7
