= Last Night I Had the Strangest Dream =

Anti-war song written by Ed McCurdy

"Strangest Dream"
- 1968 Norwegian single release

Song by Pete Seeger

from the album Love Songs for Friends & Foes
- Released: 1956
- Recorded: March 8, 1956
- Genre: Folk; country
- Length: 2:33
- Label: Folkways
- Songwriter: Ed McCurdy
- Producer: David Hancock

"Last Night I Had the Strangest Dream" (also known as "The Strangest Dream") is a song written by American folk singer-songwriter Ed McCurdy in 1950. Due to McCurdy's connection with fellow musicians, it was common in repertoires within the folk music community. The song had its first album release when Pete Seeger recorded it as "Strangest Dream" for his 1956 album Love Songs For Friends & Foes. Seeger would later re-visit the song for his 1967 album Waist Deep in the Big Muddy and other Love Songs. The strong anti-war theme of the song led it to be recorded by multiple other artists, including The Weavers (1960), Joan Baez (1962), The Kingston Trio (1963), Simon & Garfunkel (1964), and Johnny Cash who released two versions of the song during the 2000s.

The song has been recorded by over 50 acts in English, and has also been adapted into several different languages, the most successful of these translations being a Swedish version by Cornelis Vreeswijk, a song that he recorded live in late 1964 along with Fred Åkerström and Ann-Louise Hanson, and released in 1965 on their album Visor och oförskämdheter. In mid-1966, Swedish rock group the Hep Stars released a version of it as a single; it became their first Swedish-language song and peaked at number 2 on Kvällstoppen and number 1 on Svensktoppen. Danish songwriter Thøger Olesen translated it into Danish in 1965, and German singer-songwriter Hannes Wader translated it to German in 1979 for his own studio album Wieder Unterwegs.

Written during the prelude of the Korean War, "Last Night I Had the Strangest Dream" remains one of the most influential anti-war songs written, as such it is considered McCurdy's signature song and is still referenced in popular culture to this day. Although only successful in a few languages, it was translated into close to 80 languages. It acts as the theme song for the Peace Corps.

== Synopsis ==
"Last Night I Had the Strangest Dream" tells the tale of a narrator, who during one night slept and had a dream. In the dream, he encountered a room filled with men (presumably politicians) signing papers that stated "They'd never fight again". Following the ratifying and widespread publication of it, the men put aside their differences, joining hand-in-hand, bowing their heads, and praying. The lyrics then go on to describe the reaction of the public, which is joyfulness, with citizens dancing on the street while weapons and army equipment could be spotted on the ground. The song ends with the opening verse, which is "Last night I had the strangest dream, I'd never dreamed before. I dreamed the world had all agreed, to put an end to war."

== Background ==
"Last Night I Had the Strangest Dream" was initially composed by McCurdy during the spring of 1950, during a period in time in which there was an ever-looming threat of war, with a big Red Scare being spread by politicians such as Joseph McCarthy. The song was one of McCurdy's first original compositions. It was written in a period of McCurdy's life in which he resided in Canada, where he moved in 1948. It was here that McCurdy was introduced to folk music by artists such as Oscar Brand, Josh White, and Pete Seeger, a genre he would embrace on his first album by the name of Sings Canadian Folksongs in 1949. Following the release of this album, McCurdy migrated back to the United States, settling in New York City's Greenwich Village. He had a residency at a local club, where he often played together with Seeger. There he met another folk act, the Weavers, and introduced them to the song at a hotel.

In 1950, Ed McCurdy came up to the hotel room of the Weavers, who were working in the vaudeville show at the Strand Theater on Broadway at the time. He just sang "Last Time I Had the Strangest Dream" which he'd just made up. The song has never been in the top-forty, but has gradually spread throughout much of the world, and has been translated into several languages

— Ronald D. Cohen, Will Kaufman, Singing for Peace: Antiwar Songs in American History, Pete Seeger

The Weavers quickly incorporated "Last Night I Had the Strangest Dream" into their live repertoire, with a live version being recorded on April 1, 1960, for their live album The Weavers at Carnegie Hall Vol. 2, released in 1963. Seeger himself also featured the song on his live repertoire. McCurdy, the Weavers, and Seeger were the first three to perform the song as the lyrics were not published for another year; McCurdy first released them in a July 1951 copy of the folk publication Sing Out! One of the earliest recordings of the track was a live recording captured at one of Seeger's Reed College performances in 1950. While not officially issued, it was widely circulated as a Bootleg recording. McCurdy would also feature the song as a staple of his live performances, having it on his setlist for a long period of time.

Pete Seeger had been introduced to McCurdy in 1949, and "Last Night I Had the Strangest Dream" in 1950. As a result of this, the song stayed in Seeger's live repertoire. Seeger would play the song, but besides a live bootleg, it was never released on a studio album for six years until it was recorded on March 8, 1956, and subsequently issued on Love Songs For Friends & Foes, which was released that same year. The album was a minor hit and together with the Weavers, Seeger helped popularizing "Last Night I Had the Strangest Dream" to become one of the most well-known recordings. The arrangement of the song features Seeger unaccompanied, singing and playing banjo on the recording, which clocks in at approximately two minutes and thirty seconds. In his review for the album, AllMusic critic William Ruhlmann states that the album "was the most political album Seeger assembled", noting the song's inclusion on the record. Seeger would later re-record "Last Night I Had the Strangest" dream for his 1967 studio album Waist Deep in the Big Muddy and Other Love Songs, 11 years after it was first officially released on record.

== The Kingston Trio version ==
=== Background ===
"Last Night I Had the Strangest Dream"

Single by the Kingston Trio

from the album Time to Think
- B-side: "The Patriot Game"
- Released: February 17, 1964
- Recorded: 1963
- Genre: Folk
- Length: 2:08
- Label: Capitol
- Songwriter: McCurdy
- Producer: Voyle Gilmore

the Kingston Trio singles chronology
"Ally Ally Oxen Free" (1963)	"Last Night I Had the Strangest Dream" (1964)	"Seasons in the Sun" (1964)

By mid-1963, American folk trio the Kingston Trio had started recording their fourteenth studio album, Time to Think, which was finished by December of that year. "Last Night I Had the Strangest Dream" was an emotional song for John Stewart and Nick Reynolds; they could barely sing it without crying. The album was released that same month by Capitol Records, reaching number 18 on the Billboard 200. Despite reaching the top-20, Time to Think became their lowest charting album since 1962's New Frontier, which had reached number 16 the previous year. This prompted Captiol records to release singles from the album, starting with 1963's "Ally Ally Oxen Free", which was written by Rod McKuen and Jacques Brel. This single became a failure, reaching only number 61 on the Billboard Hot 100 and number 60 on Cashbox 100.

=== Release ===
In an attempt to once again reach the top-10, Capitol issued "Last Night I Had the Strangest Dream" as the second single from Time to Think, released on February 17, 1964, with the folk ballad "The Patriot Game" on its B-side. It had the catalogue number of CL 15341. Although heavily promoted, including occupying an ad occupying an entire page of the February 29, 1964, issue of Billboard magazine, it failed to chart on either the Hot 100 or the Cashbox 100. Most of their earlier recordings had reached both charts, but "Strangest Dream" and Time to Think marked their declining popularity. The follow-up "Seasons in the Sun" (also written by McKuen and Brel) was also a chart failure.

=== Personnel ===
==== The Kingston Trio ====
- Bob Shane – lead vocals, rhythm guitar
- Nick Reynolds – harmony vocals, tenor guitar
- John Stewart – harmony vocals, banjo

==== Additional personnel ====
- Dean Reilly – bass
- John Staubard – guitar

== Simon and Garfunkel version ==
"Last Night I Had the Strangest Dream"
- 1966 Japan album release

Song by Simon & Garfunkel

from the album Wednesday Morning, 3 A.M.
- Released: October 19, 1964
- Recorded: March 17, 1964
- Studio: Columbia Studios, New York City
- Genre: Folk; country
- Length: 2:11
- Label: Columbia
- Songwriter: McCurdy
- Producer: Tom Wilson

=== Background ===
American folk duo Simon & Garfunkel knew McCurdy, as he had been a host at The Bitter End, and had therefore heard him play the song. As a result, it was later decided that "Last Night I Had the Strangest Dream" would be recorded by the duo for their first album. Upon conceiving Wednesday Morning, 3 A.M. record producer Tom Wilson requested that the album would be composed of six covers and six original songs (suggesting one of the covers to be "The Times They Are a-Changin'"). The song, along with "He Was My Brother", "The Sun Is Burning", and the title track "Wednesday Morning, 3 A.M." were all recorded on March 17, 1964, at Columbia Studios in New York City.

=== Release ===
Wednesday Morning, 3 A.M. was released on October 19, 1964, by Columbia Records to critical and commercial indifference, selling only 3000 copies upon release. This led Simon & Garfunkel to temporarily break up until "The Sound of Silence" began rising the charts in late 1965. "Last Night I Had the Strangest Dream" received mixed reviews. In their review of the album, Entertainment Focus writes that "it ties it to another American musical tradition, but there’s no obvious disconnect – already it’s clearly the vocals of the two that go together perfectly, that define their overarching sound." In his book Paul Simon: An American Tune, Cornel Bonca writes that the song along with "The Sun Is Burning" are bad examples of political folk-songs due to being shallow requests for peace. In a review for AllMusic, Matthew Greenwald wrote that while they weren't as good as they later would be, their rendition of the song emphasizes on the duo's "unique and tight harmony vocals.

For unknown reasons, Wednesday Morning, 3 A.M. was released as Last Night I Had the Strangest Dream in Japan in 1966. This album was released by CBS Records and had the catalogue number of YS-711-C. For this album, CBS reshuffled the track listing, featuring "Last Night I Had the Strangest Dream" as the opening song, as opposed to "You Can Tell The World" which opens Wednesday Morning, 3 A.M.. The original album was first issued in Japan in 1969, almost five years after it was first issued.

=== Personnel ===
==== Simon & Garfunkel ====
- Art Garfunkel – harmony vocals
- Paul Simon – banjo, harmony vocals

==== Additional personnel ====
- Barry Kornfeld – acoustic guitar
- Bill Lee – double bass
- Tom Wilson – producer

== Johnny Cash version ==
"Last Night I Had the Strangest Dream"

Song by Johnny Cash

from the album American VI: Ain't No Grave
- Released: February 23, 2010
- Recorded: 2003
- Genre: Folk
- Length: 3:14
- Label: American
- Songwriter: McCurdy
- Producer: Rick Rubin

Johnny Cash had incorporated "Last Night I Had the Strangest Dream" into his live repertoire during the late 1960s, occasionally performing it. In 2003, Cash recorded it as part of his American series in 2003, during the sessions for American V: A Hundred Highways. Although Cash died on September 12, 2003, at the age of 71, the recording was not released for another six years, until it was finally issued on American VI: Ain't No Grave on February 23, 2010, his final in the American series. Cash's rendition of the song heavily features string arrangements, but is otherwise completely acoustic, with Cash and a couple of other guitarists performing it on acoustic guitar.

"Last Night I Had the Strangest Dream" received positive feedback from critics. Thom Jurek wrote in his AllMusic review of the album that the song "is a true anti-war song that serves as a testimonial." However, Stephen M. Deusner writes in his review that not even Cash could record the track without sounding slightly preposterous. In his book Johnny Cash International: How and Why Fans Love the Man in Black, Michael Hinds writes that the song only adds confusion to Cash's uncertain stance on the Vietnam War. Tony Tost writes that Cash had a contradictory position on war overall with the song. Cash had previously recorded the song live on December 5, 1969, for his 2002 live album Johnny Cash at Madison Square Garden. Richie Unterberger calls the performance spiritual in his review for the album.

=== Personnel ===
Musicians are listed on the album's liner notes.

- Johnny Cash – lead vocals, guitar
- Benmont Tench – keyboards
- Mike Campbell – guitar
- Smokey Hormel – guitar
- Jonny Polonsky – guitar

== Other English versions ==
- Guy Carawan recorded it in 1958 as "Strangest Dream" on his album Songs with Guy Carawan.
- American folk singer-songwriter Joan Baez performed the song during her early tours. An early version featuring her on guitar and vocals was recorded sometime between 1961 and 1963 and released on the November 1982 album Very Early Joan.
- The Chad Mitchell Trio released a version on their live album At the Bitter End, which was recorded on March 19, 1962. In his review of the album, Cary Ginell of AllMusic states that when the audience starts singing along on the track, it became one of the most emotional moments in the folk revival scene.
- UK band the Spinners released a version of the song as "Strangest Dream" on their 1965 album More Folk at the Phil.
- Swedish rock band Hep Stars recorded the song in both English and Swedish, releasing the Swedish version as a single while featuring the English version on their second studio album The Hep Stars, which was released in December 1966. Both versions use the same backing track
- Carolyn Hester recorded it with her band the Carolyn Hester Coalition for their 1968 debut album of the same name. In his review of the album, Richie Unterberger of AllMusic states that the song "is an effective interpretation of a significant composition that was overlooked by other folk-rock acts"
- The Brothers Four recorded it as "The Strangest Dream" for their 1969 album Let's Get Together.
- Mitch Miller and the Gang recorded a version as the opening track on their 1970 peace album Peace Sing-Along.
- American folk group The Hillside Singers recorded a version for their 1971 album I'd Like to Teach the World to Sing.
- John Denver frequently performed this song throughout his career, and it appears on his 1971 Live concert album Live at the Troubadour.
- In 1971, Champaign, Illinois rock band Mason Proffit recorded it and released it as the title song for their third studio album. Billboard magazine wrote that the track was the album's best cut, while Richard Foss at AllMusic writes that the track, along with "Eugene Pratt" are "noteworthy for their gentle insistence that something is wrong with the society in which we live, and something should be done about it immediately."
- Irish folk group Ryan's Fancy recorded it as the final track on their 1973 studio album Times To Remember.
- Arlo Guthrie recorded it as "(Last Night I Had) the Strangest Dream" for his 1978 album One Night, with the band Shenandoah.
- The Limeliters featured it on their live repertoire, and recorded a live version in November 1985 for their live album Alive in Concert, Vol. 1.
- Male A cappella group The Flirtations recorded the song live for their 1992 live album Live – Out on the Road.
- Penny Lang featured a live version on her 1997 album Live at the Yellow Door.
- American psychedelic band Spirit recorded it for their 2003 album Blues from the Soul.
- While American singer-songwriter Garth Brooks recorded it, it wasn't released on a studio album, instead being released on The Limited Series.
- A version appeared on Serena Ryder's 2006 album If Your Memory Serves You Well.
- The Canadian band The Raftsmen included the song on their 1962 album Down in the Valley and it was released as the first single from that album.

== Swedish versions ==
=== Cornelis Vreeswijk version ===
"I natt jag drömde något som"

Song by Cornelis Vreeswijk, Fred Åkerström and Ann-Louise Hanson

from the album Visor och oförskämdheter
- Released: 1965
- Recorded: December 4, 1964
- Venue: Stockholm Concert Hall
- Genre: Folk
- Length: 3:14
- Label: Metronome
- Composer: McCurdy
- Lyricist: Cornelis Vreeswijk
- Producer: Anders Burman

The song was first translated into Swedish by Dutch-Swedish singer-songwriter Cornelis Vreeswijk, under the title "I natt jag drömde något som" ("Last Night I Dreamed Something That"). The song did not feature a new arrangement, with the only difference being the translation, which varies slightly from the English original. In the Swedish version, the lines which alludes to people dancing in the street is replaced by a line which states that they instead partied at bars and pubs, drinking and smiling. The line which reads "They'd never fight again" is replaced with a line which roughly translates to "there exists no more soldiers or rifles, and nobody has ever heard the term military."

Vreeswijk first recorded "I natt jag drömde något som" live on Friday December 4, 1964, a performance he held at the Stockholm Concert Hall in the country's capital. This performance was together with fellow Swedish singers Fred Åkerström and Ann-Louise Hanson, the latter of which sings solo on the track. The performance was sold out, with an additional having to be scheduled. This recording was issued early in 1965 on Visor och oförskämdheter (Poems and Rudeness), on Metronome Records with the catalogue number MLP 15176 and was produced by Anders Burman. Although only issued as an album track, "I natt jag drömde något som" managed to chart on Svensktoppen, entering the chart on April 10, 1965, and staying there for a week before ascending to number 9 the following week before leaving the chart.

==== Personnel ====
- Cornelis Vreeswijk – harmony vocals, acoustic guitar
- Fred Åkerström – harmony vocals, acoustic guitar
- Ann-Louise Hanson – harmony and lead vocals
- Nils Hellmark – guitar

==== Charts ====
Chart (1965)	Peak position
Sweden (Svensktoppen)	8

=== Hep Stars version ===
"I natt jag drömde"

Single by the Hep Stars
- B-side: "Jag vet"
- Released: September 1966
- Recorded: August 22–23, 1966
- Studio: Philips Studio, Stockholm
- Genre: Folk; soft rock
- Length: 2:19
- Label: Olga
- Composer: McCurdy
- Lyricist: Vreeswijk
- Producer: Gert Palmcrantz

the Hep Stars singles chronology
"Wedding" (1966)	"I natt jag drömde" (1966)	"Consolation" (1966)

==== Background ====
By mid-1966, the Hep Stars had established themselves as a hugely successful recording artists, but also as great songwriters, with keyboardist Benny Andersson writing their number-1 hit "Sunny Girl" on February 10, 1966. "Sunny Girl" was released in March of that year and reached number 1 on both Kvällstoppen and Tio i Topp. The follow up "Wedding" was a collaboration between Andersson and lead singer Svenne Hedlund. This song was released in May of that year and reached number 1 on both charts as well. However, these two releases also led to some disputes by band members; these two recordings were unlike anything they'd previously recorded. The sound was soft, compared to the rhythm and blues sound that dominated their earlier singles.

The Hep Stars had at the time changed their live repertoire as well, due to Hedlund breaking his foot, requiring him to sit still on a chair on stage. As a result of this, the group had begun incorporating slower songs into their setlist, ditching "Whole Lotta Shakin' Goin' On", which they'd frantically closed every show with. They had now also heard Vreejswijk's rendition of "I natt jag drömde något som", and began playing the song live. Unlike previous renditions, both in Swedish and English, is that the Hep Stars' version of it is electrical, featuring Janne Frisk playing electric guitar while Andersson is playing the Hammond B3 organ. So on the night between August 22–23, 1966, the group entered Philips Studio in Stockholm, Sweden, successfully recording the song.

Beyond the Swedish rendition of the song, the Hep Stars would also go on to record an English rendition of the song as well. The vocals were also taped during the night between August 22–23. Both of these versions have an identical backing track which were then sung in the respective languages. The only difference between the Swedish and the English renditions is that due to the Swedish version only being put out as a single, and not on an LP record, it was never mixed to stereo, whereas the English rendition exists in both mono and stereo versions. The Swedish rendition would be released as a single the following month, while the English version would be included on their second studio album The Hep Stars in December of that year.

==== Release ====
The band did not agree on releasing the song, as it further strayed the band away from their roots. However, they decided to release it anyway. The single was released in September 1966 by Olga Records with the catalogue number SO 29. For reasons unknown, the Hep Stars release of the song shortened the title down to simply "I natt jag drömde" ("Last Night I Dreamed"). The B-side was "Jag Vet", which was a Swedish translation of Perry Como's 1959 single "I Know", which was written by Carl Stutz and reached number 13 on the UK Singles Chart that year. "Jag Vet" was translated by Bengt Sigurd, a version which was first released that same year by Gunnar Wiklund. "I natt jag drömde" was issued in 80,000 copies.

The song entered Svensktoppen on January 7, 1967, where it peaked at number 1, a position it held for an entire eight weeks. On March 4 it had finally exited the first spot, climbing to number 3 and being replaced by "En Sång En Gång För Längesen" by Hootenanny Singers. The single held position number 3 on the chart for three weeks. The following week, it had ascended to number 5, which it only held for a single week. On April 8, it was seen at number 9, a position it again held for three weeks. However, it would climb to number 7 on April 29, a position it held for one week. It was last seen on Svensktoppen the following week at number 8, before disappearing off the charts. In total, the single stayed on the chart for 17 weeks, of which 12 were in the top-5 and 8 were at the top position.

It also fared well on the sales chart, Kvällstoppen. It first entered the chart on October 4, 1966, at a position of number 7 before making its way to number 4 the following week. On October 18, it reached its peak of number 2, where it stayed for three weeks before dropping to number 3, where it stayed for two weeks. On November 22, it had ascended to number 4, before reaching number 5 the following week. On December 9, it made a surprising jump from number 5 to number 9, where it stayed for two weeks in total. On December 20, it had gone to number 10, a position it held for two weeks. On January 3, 1967, it had once again started climbing its way back onto the chart, reaching number 7. After jumping back to number 10 the week after it reached number 4 on January 17. On January 24, it had once again reached number 2, a position it this time held for six weeks before going to number 4 on March 7. The following week it had jumped to number 6, a position it held for two weeks until March 28, when it went up to number 9 for two weeks. It first exited the top-10 on April 11 at a position of number 11, and was last spotted on the chart the following week at number 15. In total, it spent 29 weeks on the chart, of which 27 were in the top-10, 16 were in the top-5, and 9 at number 2.

Despite being sung in Swedish, the single also charted on Norway's sales chart, VG-lista. It entered the chart at a position of number 10 on October 29, 1966. The following week, it had climbed its way up to number 7 before dropping off the charts on November 12. However, it re-appeared on the charts the following week at a position of number 9, and by December 3, 1966, it had reached number 8. However, the week after it had dropped down to number 10 before once again reaching number 9. By December 17 it was back at number 7, and by the next week it reached number 6, a position it held for three weeks. By January 14, 1967, it had climbed to number 5, and the following week it reached its peak of number 4. The following week it once again fell to number 5 for two weeks before once again peaking at number 4 on February 11, a position it held for 5 weeks. By March 18, the single had dropped to number 6 and was back on number 10 the following week. However, a week later it had risen to number 9, and by April 8 was at number 7. The following week it dropped back down to number 10 before once again reaching number 7. By April 16, it had reached number 8, a position it held for three weeks before leaving the chart. In total, it spent 28 weeks on the charts, of which 9 were in the top-5.

"I natt jag drömde" became the Hep Stars' first single in Swedish. Being originally issued in 80,000 copies, it sold an at the time undefeated 300,000 copies in Sweden alone. Due to charting on Svensktoppen, which only played songs in the Swedish language, it attracted an entire new generation of Hep Stars fans. "I natt jag drömde" was the first cover song the Hep Stars released as a single since 1965's "Should I". "I natt jag drömde" is, together with "Cadillac" and "Sunny Girl", considered to be one of their signature songs.

==== Personnel ====
- Svenne Hedlund – lead vocals
- Janne Frisk – electric guitar, backing vocals
- Lennart Hegland – bass guitar, backing vocals
- Benny Andersson – Hammond organ, backing vocals
- Christer Petterson – tambourine, backing vocals

==== Charts ====
Chart (1966–1967)	Peak position
Sweden (Kvällstoppen)	2
Sweden (Svensktoppen)	1
Finland (The Official Finnish Charts)	12
Norway (VG-lista)	4

== See also ==
- List of anti-war songs
