= Consolation (song) =

Song written by Benny Andersson

- Swedish picture sleeve

Single by the Hep Stars

from the album The Hep Stars
- B-side: "Don't"
- Released: 15 October 1966
- Recorded: c. 29 August 1966
- Studio: Philips, Stockholm
- Genre: Pop
- Length: 3:25
- Label: Olga
- Songwriter: Benny Andersson
- Producer: The Hep Stars

The Hep Stars singles chronology
"I Natt Jag Drömde" (1966)	"Consolation" (1966)	"Malaika" (1967)

Audio
- "Consolation" on YouTube

"Consolation" is a song by Swedish pop band the Hep Stars, written by their keyboardist Benny Andersson. Andersson composed the song during the summer of 1966 and was initially reluctant about its qualities. He was persuaded to record it by his bandmates during the sessions for the band's second studio album in August 1966 at the Philips Studio in Stockholm. The song was produced by the band themselves, with Gert Palmcrantz engineering. Musically, "Consolation" is a pop song that prominently features an echo effect alongside a "mystical" keyboard sound akin to the music of the Doors.

Olga Records released "Consolation" as a single in Sweden on 15 October 1966, with "Don't" as the B-side. The release was prompted by response to their Swedish language- single "I Natt Jag Drömde" which had alienated fans. The single was a commercial success in Sweden, reaching at number two on Tio i Topp and topping the sales chart Kvällstoppen for ten non-consecutive weeks between November 1966 and January 1967. It was also successful outside of Sweden, reaching at number seven in Finland.

In April 1967, "Consolation" was awarded a gold disc for the sales of 100,000 copies in Sweden, shortly after its inclusion on their second album The Hep Stars in December 1966. An alternative take of "Consolation" was issued in Britain by accident. Upon release, "Consolation" received mixed reviews, with some critics praising Andersson's keyboard performance and others dismissing it as subpar material. Retrospectively, Andersson was continuously dismissive of it, considering it his worst composition. It nonetheless reflected a musical thread to his later work in ABBA, and other critics cite it as a highlight of late 1960s Swedish pop.

== Composition and recording ==
Benny, always his own harshest critic, was sometimes unable to recognize the true merit of his material. Originally, he didn't see any potential at all in "Consolation" and had to be persuaded by his fellow band members that the song should be recorded.

— Carl Magnus Palm (2002)

As with the Hep Stars' two prior English-language singles "Sunny Girl" and "Wedding" (both 1966), "Consolation" was penned by keyboardist Benny Andersson. (Note: "Wedding" had been co-written by the band's lead vocalist Svenne Hedlund.) Written during the summer of 1966, ABBA biographer Carl Magnus Palm stated that "Consolation" marked an "unabated" development in Andersson's songwriting. It is suggested that Andersson was doubtful about "Consolation", finding it to be subpar to his earlier material; he had to be coerced by the other members of the band to record it. Dan-Eric Landén states that "Consolation" was most likely recorded on 29 August 1966, during the sessions for the band's second studio album at the Philips Studio in Gärdet, Stockholm. The members of the Hep Stars producing the recording themselves. Long-time band collaborator Gert Palmcrantz was present as an audio engineer.

With a runtime of 3:25, "Consolation" is in the key of C with a BPM of 129. Two versions of "Consolation" exist, with the one released in Sweden featuring an echo effect. (Note: The second version of "Consolation", released in England, features the bass mixed low, lacks the afforementioned echo and features an alternate organ arrangement during the song's introduction. Palm speculates that this was the first take of "Consolation".) Music journalist Harry Amster draws a parallel with Andersson's organ sound on "Consolation" to Ray Manzarek's equivalent sound in the Doors, though he believes the former would have been forgotten if not for his later association with ABBA. Similarly, Palm noted the organ on "Consolation" as "mystical". He believed the song to be a pop production that featured a memorable chorus. He described the song as representative of late 1960s Swedish pop.

== Release and commercial performance ==
As a precursor to the Hep Stars second album, Olga Records issued "Consolation" as a single on 15 October 1966 with the Elvis Presley cover "Don't" as the B-side. (Note: Catalogue number SO 33) "Consolation" was also released as a single in West Germany through Polydor Records. (Note: Catalogue number Polydor 590 77.) The song was released only a few weeks after their previous single, the Swedish language "I Natt Jag Drömde", which had alienated fans as it was material aimed at the more mature Svensktoppen chart. This discrepancy was commented on in the Swedish press, with the staff writer for Arbetet believing that "Consolation" was rush-released to satiate fans of the band who were critical of "I Natt Jag Drömde".

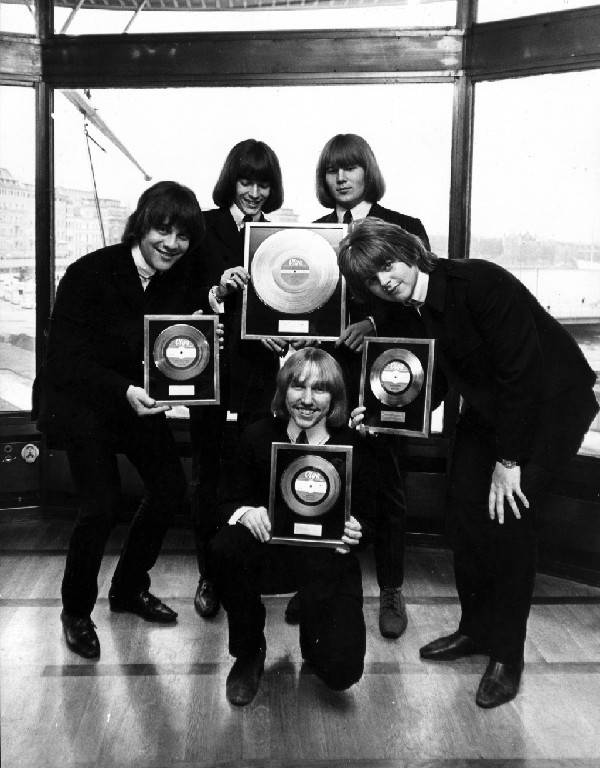
Hep Stars posing with gold discs in 1967. "Consolation" was the seventh single by the Hep Stars to be awarded a gold disc.

"Consolation" entered Swedish record chart Tio i Topp at number four on 29 October 1966, before peaking at number two on 12 November, unable to dislodge "Marble Breaks and Iron Bends (Dum Dum)" by the Deejays from the top spot. (Note: "Marble Breaks and Iron Bends (Dum Dum)" by the Deejays was produced by Benny Andersson and Svenne Hedlund, and had been released on the Hep Stars' independent record label Hep House.) It spent a total of five weeks on the chart. (Note: Comparatively, "Sunny Girl" and "Wedding" spent 15 and eight weeks on Tio i Topp, respectively.) On sales chart Kvällstoppen both "Consolation" and "Don't" were listed as a double A-side and debuted at number one on 8 November 1966. In total, "Consolation" and "Don't" spent ten non-consecutive weeks at number one, and was the Hep Stars most successful single on that chart. (Note: "Consolation" shared the number-one spot on Kvällstoppen with "Miss Mac Baren" by Tages during its tenth and final week on top of the charts on 17 January 1967.) According to Cash Box, "Consolation" was Sweden's third biggest selling single in November 1966, and the best-selling single during the entirety of December. Elsewhere in the world, "Consolation" also reached number seven in Finland in November 1966.

By mid-December 1966, "Consolation" had sold 80,000 copies in Sweden alone, and 90,000 by early January 1967, before the Hep Stars received a gold disc for the sale of 100,000 copies of the single in Sweden in April 1967. "Consolation" was the seventh of eight singles by the Hep Stars to be awarded a gold disc. "Consolation" was included as the third track on the Hep Stars second studio album The Hep Stars which Olga issued on 19 December 1966. (Note: Catalogue number LPO 04.) On the album, it was sequenced between the songs "The Birds in the Sky" and "Easy to Fool". In the UK, Olga released an alternate take of "Consolation" as the B-side of the single "Wedding" in February 1968. (Note: Catalogue number Ole 001.) (Note: Palm believes that Olga in Sweden sent the wrong master tape to their British offices for the UK release.)

== Reception and legacy ==
Upon release, "Consolation" received mixed reviews in the Swedish press, with a statement by Håkan Sandén of Bildjournalen classing it as a "beautiful, haunting" record. He praised the build-up of the verses into the chorus to be of an "international level". His review ended with a praising of Andersson's keyboard performance. Similarly, the staff reviewer for Arbetet particularly noted Andersson's performance on the disc as "inventive", describing him as a keyboard-virtuoso. He also praised the songwriting as one of the Hep Stars' advantages. On the contrary, the staff reviewer for Expressen called "Consolation" nothing more than a "middle-of-the-road" single that would sell only because of the Hep Stars' fame.

Despite the commercial success the single saw, Andersson was never proud of the song, and in a May 1967 interview still considered it his worst composition to date. In retrospect, however, Andersson stated that he saw a musical thread between "Consolation" and "Wedding" that carried over to his later works with ABBA alongside the Chess and Kristina från Duvemåla musicals. Journalist Dan Backman of Svenska Dagbladet classify both "Consolation" and "Wedding" as two of the Hep Stars best recordings. Landén found "Consolation" to be a "strong melody" with a clear "Andersson-signum" and a highlight of the Swedish 1960s pop, and additionally suggested the success of the single contributed to the Hep Stars being behind 10% of all domestic record sales in Sweden during 1966.

== Personnel ==
Personnel is adapted from liner notes of Like We Used To: The Anthology 1965-67, unless otherwise noted.

The Hep Stars

The Hep Stars also collectively produced the recording.

- Svenne Hedlund – lead vocals
- Jan "Janne" Frisk – guitar, vocals
- Benny Andersson – keyboards
- Lennart "Lelle" Hegland – bass guitar
- Christer "Chrille" Pettersson – drums

Other personnel

- Lennart ”Felle” Fernholm – sleeve photography
- Gert Palmcrantz – audio engineer

== Charts ==
Weekly chart performance for "Consolation"
Chart (1966–1967)	Peak position
Finland (Mitä Suomi Soittaa?)	7
Sweden (Kvällstoppen)	1
Sweden (Tio i Topp)	2
