= So Mystifying =

1964 song written by Ray Davies

Song by the Kinks

from the album Kinks
- Released: 2 October 1964
- Recorded: August 1964
- Studio: Pye, London
- Genre: Rhythm and blues
- Length: 2:58
- Label: Pye
- Songwriter: Ray Davies
- Producer: Shel Talmy

"So Mystifying" is a song by the English rock band the Kinks. Written by Ray Davies, it was first released on the band's 1964 debut album Kinks. It appears as the second track on side one, following "Beautiful Delilah", and is the first track on the album on which Ray Davies performs the lead vocals. The best known version of the song was recorded by Swedish rock group Hep Stars, whose version of the song reached the top-five on both Kvällstoppen and Tio I Topp in 1965.

== The Kinks version ==
The song revolves around a guitar riff played by the band's lead guitarist Dave Davies and feature "Beatle-like" harmonies. As a result of this, it doesn't feature significant American phrasing. The song is the first original composition on the album, following "Beautiful Delilah" written by Chuck Berry. It is also the first song where the listener is introduced to Ray Davies's lead vocals, as his brother Dave sings lead on "Beautiful Delilah".

The song was recorded in late August 1964 at Pye Studios number 2 in London together with almost all other tracks from the album. The session was produced by American producer Shel Talmy. "So Mystifying" feature a similar chord sequence and tempo with "It's All Over Now" by the Rolling Stones, a song which had reached number 1 on the UK Singles Chart in July 1964, shortly before the majority of Kinks had been recorded.

It has been suggested by many websites that guitarist Jimmy Page (later of the Yardbirds and Led Zeppelin fame) played on "So Mystifying" along with all other tracks on Kinks. However, this claim has never been proven and has been refuted multiple times. Page did however play on other tracks from the album, including "I'm a Lover Not a Fighter" and "I've Been Driving on Bald Mountain". Session drummer Bobby Graham played on the recording due to drummer Mick Avory being demoted by Talmy because he considered Avory "too inexperienced." Avory played tambourine on the recording as a compensation.

=== Personnel ===
The Kinks

- Ray Davies – lead vocals, rhythm guitar
- Dave Davies – lead guitar, backing vocals
- Pete Quaife – bass guitar, backing vocals
- Mick Avory – tambourine

Other personnel

- Bobby Graham – drums
- Shel Talmy – producer

== Hep Stars version ==
"So Mystifying"

Single by the Hep Stars
- B-side: "Young and Beautiful"
- Released: September 1965
- Recorded: September 1965
- Studio: Europafilm, Stockholm
- Genre: Pop; rhythm and blues
- Length: 2:48
- Label: Olga
- Songwriter: Ray Davies
- Producer: Gert Palmcrantz

The Hep Stars singles chronology
"No Response" (1965)	"So Mystifying" (1965)	"Should I" (1965)

Swedish rock group Hep Stars recorded "So Mystifying" in September 1965, intended for single release. The single marked a return to the band briefly recording covers for their singles, following their first self-penned composition "No Response" which had been written by keyboardist Benny Andersson. The song had been a part of the Hep Stars repertoire during the late summer when they performed in Folkparks across Sweden. It, just like "No Response", had gotten positive feedback from the audience which led the band to record the track. In September of that year, the group entered Europafilm Studios in Solna, Stockholm to record the song. Bassist Lennart Hegland was substituted on bass by Lennart Fernholm, the band's tour manager, something that he'd done for all the Hep Stars recordings since "Bald Headed Woman" was recorded. Hegland appears on the recording, singing backing vocals. Hep Stars were fans of the Kinks, with "So Mystifying" being the second Kinks song they recorded, the first being "Bald Headed Woman".

Olga Records released "So Mystifying" as a single in September 1965, shortly after it was recorded. It succeeded "No Response" only by a few weeks. The song entered Kvällstoppen on 12 October 1965 at a position of number 19. The following week, the single had reached the top-5 for the first time at a position of number 5. It stayed there for one week before ascending to number 7 the following week. On the 2nd of November it had once again reached its peak of number 5 before going straight to number 9 the following week. The single stayed at number 9 for four weeks in November, before finally exiting the top-10 on the 7th of December. That was also the last week it was seen on the chart before exiting, at a position of 15. In total, the single spent 9 weeks on the chart, of which 7 were in the top-10 and 2 were in the top-5. It fared similarly well on Tio I Topp, where it reached a position of number 4, spending only two weeks there. Although this was a chart success, it was their lowest charting single since "A Tribute to Buddy Holly" charted in April.

The B-Side was "Young and Beautiful", which was written by Aaron Schroeder and Abner Silver. It had previously appeared on their debut album We and Our Cadillac. Although the studio recording of the song never was included on a studio album, a live version was recorded on 7–8 August, which was later included on their only live album Hep Stars on Stage.

=== Personnel ===
Hep Stars

- Svenne Hedlund – lead vocals
- Janne Frisk – guitar, backing vocals
- Christer Pettersson – drums, tambourine, backing vocals
- Benny Andersson – electric organ, backing vocals
- Lennart Hegland – backing vocals

Other personnel

- Lennart Fernhom – bass guitar
- Gert Palmcrantz – producer

=== Charts ===
Chart (1965)	Peak position
Sweden (Kvällstoppen)	5
Sweden (Tio I Topp)	4
