= Hep Stars on Stage =

Live album by Hep Stars
- Released: December 1965
- Recorded: 7 and 8 August 1965
- Venues: Trollhättan and Västerås folkparks, Sweden
- Genre: Hard rock
- Length: 34:27
- Label: Olga Records
- Producer: Gert Palmcrantz

Hep Stars chronology
We and Our Cadillac (1965)	Hep Stars on Stage (1965)	The Hep Stars (1966)

Professional ratings
Review scores
Source	Rating
AllMusic	3/5 stars

Hep Stars on Stage (also referred to as simply On Stage) is the first live album and second overall release by Swedish rock band Hep Stars. Released in December 1965 on Olga Records, the album is composed of recordings made on 7 and 8 August 1965 at two separate folkparks in Trollhättan and Västerås, Sweden. Hep Stars on Stage, although not the first live album by a Swedish artist, was the first live recording of a Swedish rock group released.

The album is composed of rock standards, including "What'd I Say", "Surfin' Bird" and "If You Need Me", but also features the band's hit singles of the time, such as the opening track, "Farmer John", "Bald Headed Woman", "No Response" and "So Mystifying", all of which had been hits on both Kvällstoppen and Tio i Topp. On "Cadillac", Lennart Fernholm, the band's tour manager, introduces the band by their nicknames, which were "Chrille" (Christer Pettersson), "Janne" (Janne Frisk), "Lelle" (Lennart Hegland), "Benne" (Benny Andersson) and "Svenne" (Svenne Hedlund).

Nonetheless the album became a huge success in Sweden, reaching number two on Bildjournalen's LP-Toppen (LP-Top) after The Beatles Rubber Soul in Sweden, and number 20 in Norway. The album was a favorite of Per Gessle when he was younger. The album was remastered and re-issued in 1996, with added content, consisting of singles and B-sides.

== Track listing ==
Writing credits and track lengths adapted from the 1996 re-issue of Hep Stars on Stage.

Side one

1. "Cadillac" (Don Gibson, Michael Brown, Graham Johnson, Ian Mallet, Vince Taylor) – 2:24
2. "What'd I Say" (Ray Charles) – 2:52
3. "Donna" (Ritchie Valens) – 3:05
4. "What Do You Want to Make Those Eyes at Me For?" (James Monaco, Howard Johnson, Joseph McCarthy) – 1:45
5. "So Mystifying" (Ray Davies) – 2:42
6. "Only You" (Buck Ram) – 3:28
7. "Wear My Ring Around Your Neck" (Barbara Carroll, Russel Moody) – 1:48

Side two

1. "Surfin' Bird" (Alfred Frazier, Turner Wilson, Carl White, John Harris) – 1:22
2. "Tallahassee Lassie" (Frank Slay, Bob Crewe, Frederick Picariello) – 1:59
3. "No Response" (Benny Andersson) – 1:32
4. "If You Need Me" (Wilson Pickett, Robert Bateman, Sonny Sanders) – 2:17
5. "Farmer John" (Don Harris, Dewey Terry) – 1:12
6. "Bald Headed Woman" (Shel Talmy) – 2:27
7. "Whole Lot-ta Shak-in' Goin' On" (Dave Williams, Sunny David) – 5:34

== Personnel ==
Personnel according to writer Carl Magnus Palm, unless otherwise noted.

The Hep Stars

- Svenne Hedlund – lead vocals ("Cadillac", "What'd I Say", "Donna", "So Mystifying", "Wear My Ring Around Your Neck", "No Response", "Farmer John", and "Bald Headed Woman"), co-lead vocals ("What Do You Want to Make Those Eyes at Me For?", and "Whole Lot-ta Shak-in' Goin' On")
- Jan "Janne" Frisk – guitar, lead vocals ("Only You", "Tallahassee Lassie", and "If You Need Me"), co-lead vocals ("What Do You Want to Make Those Eyes at Me For?", and "Whole Lot-ta Shak-in' Goin' On")
- Benny Andersson – keyboards
- Lennart "Lelle" Hegland – bass guitar
- Christer "Chrille" Pettersson – drums, lead vocals ("Surfin' Bird")

Other personnel

- Gert Palmcrantz – production, remote recording
- Åke Gerhard – liner notes
- Lennart Fernholm – vocal introduction ("Cadillac")
- Ulf H. Holmstedt – cover photography

== Charts ==
Weekly chart performance for Hep Stars on Stage
Chart (1967)	Peak position
Norwegian VG-lista LPs Chart	20
