= Farmer John (song) =

1959 single by Don Harris and Dewey Terry

Single by Don and Dewey
- B-side: "Justine"
- Released: February 1959
- Recorded: 1959
- Genre: Rhythm and blues
- Length: 2:30
- Label: Specialty
- Songwriters: Don "Sugarcane" Harris; Dewey Terry

Don and Dewey singles chronology
"Koko Joe" (1958)	"Farmer John" (1959)	"Fiddlin' the Blues" (1959)

"Farmer John" is a song written by Don "Sugarcane" Harris and Dewey Terry, and first recorded by the two as the American R&B duo Don and Dewey, in 1959. Although the original version of the composition did not receive much attention, it was reinvigorated by the garage rock band the Premiers, whose raving remake of the song was released in 1964. The song's raw and partying atmosphere was immensely popular, reaching number 19 on the Billboard Hot 100. Following the group's national success, several additional interpretations of "Farmer John" were released, making the tune a classic of garage rock.

In 1965, Swedish rock band Hep Stars released a version of "Farmer John" that reached number one on the Swedish sales charts.

== Original version ==
Don and Dewey penned "Farmer John", a simplistic tune about marrying a farmer's daughter, in early 1959, and first recorded their original rendition in January 1959. The duo's R&B song was much more subdued than the Premiers' later interpretation, with trumpet instrumentals and a sax solo providing backdrop to Don and Dewey's vocal harmonies. It was released as a single in February 1959 on Specialty Records; however, the song did not receive much attention and failed to chart. "Farmer John", like much of the pair's material (including "I'm Leaving It Up to You" and "Big Boy Pete"), was recognized only when another artist covered the song.

== The Premiers version ==
"Farmer John"

Single by The Premiers

from the album Farmer John Live!
- B-side: "Duffy's Blues"
- Released: March 19, 1964
- Recorded: 1964
- Studio: Stereo Masters, Hollywood, California
- Genre: Garage rock; R&B
- Length: 2:12
- Label: Faro; Warner Bros.
- Songwriters: Harris; Terry
- Producers: Billy Cardenas; Eddie Davis

The Premiers singles chronology
"Farmer John" (1964)	"Get Your Baby" (1965)

Featuring brothers Lawrence Perez on lead guitar and John Perez on drums, the Premiers were established as many garage rock bands were, practicing in their garage. The group had the opportunity to record "Farmer John" when the mother of the brothers arranged an audition with record producer Billy Cardenas, who was instrumental in promoting several Chicano groups. As Lawrence Perez recalled, Cardenas recommended to the Premiers that they cover "Farmer John", saying he "wanted to do it more East L.A.-style, or 'Louie Louie'-type. At the time, the 'Louie Louie'-type rhythm and sound was happening, so we tried to base the beat and sound towards that". As it so happens, "Louie Louie" had, like "Farmer John" begun as a single released by a Los Angeles-based African-American R&B musical act (in this case Richard Berry), before the Kingsmen's classic rendition propelled to number two on the Billboard Hot 100. For that reason, the Premiers' cover was marked by the same kind of unpolished adolescence that garnered the Kingsmen national success.

Although the band is credited with recording the song live at the Rhythm Room in Fullerton, California on the single's label, the Premiers actually used Stereo Masters Studios in Hollywood to record "Farmer John". Cardenas delivers the unusual spoken word intro asking if anyone has seen "Kosher Pickle Harry", before the song breaks into a simplistic, but catchy, three-chord melody. The key to closely resembling a live performance of "Farmer John" was supplied by members of the all-girl Chevelles Car Club, who provided the majority of the vibrant audience noise. Co-producer Eddie Davis, quoted in The West Coast East Side Sound, Volume 3 compilation album, recollected "We had a party at the studio and had all the kids come down. Everybody was having a good time and we put the record on – in those days they had three-track recording – and while everybody was having a party we recorded the crowd on top of it". This live party sound had been employed by Cardenas and Davis on an earlier recording, the Blendells cover of Little Stevie Wonder's "La La La La La," which reached number 62 on the national charts in 1964.

"Farmer John" was originally released on Davis's independent record label, Faro Records, but was soon licensed by Warner Bros. Records, and distributed nationally in September 1964. It became the Premiers' one and only Top 40 single, as it charted at number 19 on the Billboard Hot 100. In the following month, the band appeared on the television program American Bandstand, where Dick Clark announced that the group would be featured on his Caravan of Stars national tour. An alternate version of the song, which appears on the Premiers only album, Farmer John Live!, features crowd sounds that nearly drown out the vocals. Though further success eluded the group, "Farmer John" had become a staple in the repertoire of numerous garage rock bands, inspiring cover versions of the tune over the years. In 1972, the composition was included on the well-known compilation Nuggets: Original Artyfacts from the First Psychedelic Era, 1965–1968.

=== Personnel ===
- Lawrence Perez – lead guitar
- John Perez – drums, vocals
- George Delgado – rhythm guitar, vocals
- Frank Zuniga – bass guitar
- Tony Duran – saxophone

=== Chart positions ===
Chart (1964)	Peak position
US Cash Box Top 100	19
US Billboard Hot 100	19

== Hep Stars version ==
"Farmer John"

Single by the Hep Stars
- B-side: "Donna"
- Released: March 1965
- Recorded: December 1964
- Studio: Borgarskolan, Stockholm
- Genre: Garage rock; R&B
- Length: 1:52
- Label: Olga
- Songwriters: Harris; Terry
- Producer: Åke Gerhard

The Hep Stars singles chronology
"Summertime Blues" (1965)	"Farmer John" (1965)	"Cadillac" (1965)

Swedish rock band Hep Stars recorded "Farmer John" as a single in late 1964. The band most likely did not derive their rendition of the song from The Premiers, which, despite being a sizable hit in the US, did not chart in Sweden. They presumably got their inspiration from British beat group the Searchers, who had recorded the track for their debut album Meet The Searchers in 1963. Both covers are extremely similar to each other, with both featuring the drum-roll intro along with the distinct harmonies and vocalizations not found on the Premiers version. Although the rendition heavily relies on the Searchers version of the track, the Hep Stars heard it through a Finnish rock band first before listening to other versions. The Hep Stars version is notably much more quicker and raw than both previous counterparts.

"Farmer John" originates in one consequtive six-hour recording session in late December 1964 when they cut three singles, "A Tribute to Buddy Holly", "Summertime Blues" and "Farmer John" along with their respective B-Sides, "Bird Dog", "If You Need Me" and "Donna". However, none of these tracks would be issued for another approximately three months, with the exception of "A Tribute to Buddy Holly" which was released in February of that year. "A Tribute To Buddy Holly" first failed to garner any attention, but after an appearance on Swedish television show Drop-In on March 23, 1965, it quickly rose through the charts, peaking at number five on Kvällstoppen. Following this, Olga Records rush-released three singles simultaneously in late March 1965, those being "Summertime Blues", "Farmer John" and their rendition of "Brand New Cadillac", retitled "Cadillac" which had been recorded in February of that year.

"Farmer John" entered Kvällstoppen on April 27, at a position of number 10. The following week it entered the top-5, at number 5. It slowly progressed up the charts the following week, reaching number 4. The week after it reached number 2. On May 25, it had reached number 1, a position it held for 4 consecutive weeks before being replaced by "Bring It On Home to Me" by the Animals on June 22. It exited the top-5 on July 6, and left the top-10 on the 20th. It was last seen on August 24 at a position of 20, but later re-entered the chart four weeks later at number 18 for a week. In total, the single spent 19 weeks on Kvällstoppen, of which 12 were in the top-10, 9 were in the top-5 and 4 were at number 1. It fared similarly well on Tio i Topp as well, spending 12 weeks on that chart, reaching number one.

Bruce Eder of AllMusic describes the song as a pale imitation of the Premiers original, but a satisfaction for their home-grown audience. Although not issued on an album, it is featured on the 1996 remaster of the group's debut album We and Our Cadillac. A live version was featured on their 1965 live album Hep Stars On Stage.

=== Personnel ===
- Svenne Hedlund – lead vocals
- Christer Pettersson – drums, backing vocals
- Janne Frisk – guitar, backing vocals
- Benny Andersson – keyboards
- Lennart Hegland – bass guitar

=== Chart positions ===
Chart (1965)	Peak position
Sweden (Kvällstoppen)	1
Sweden (Tio i Topp)	1
Norway (VG-lista)	4

== Other versions ==
- In August 1963, the Searchers featured "Farmer John" on their debut album Meet the Searchers. The album peaked at number two on the UK Album Charts.
- Danish rock band the Defenders issued the song on their debut single on Sonet Records, in 1964.
- The Invictas' version of "Farmer John" was released on their album A-Go-Go, in 1965.
- Detroit-based garage rock group the Tidal Waves released the composition on their first single on SVR Records, in May 1966. It was immensely popular regionally, reaching the Top 10 on several radio charts and number 79 on Cashbox.
- The Matadors recorded a Czech-speaking interpretation of the tune for their debut single on Supraphon in 1966.
- Neil Young performed the song live with his early band The Squires, and later revisited "Farmer John" on his album Ragged Glory in September 1990. It also appears on the live albums from that period Weld released in 1991 and Way Down in the Rust Bucket released in 2021.
- Los Lobos released a cover version of the song as a single in 1981 and have performed the song many times over the years. The band re-recorded it for their album Native Sons in 2021.
- The Delmonas released a version of the song on their eponymous 1989 album.
- Billy Childish used the Premiers' version of the tune as the basis for a new song Davy Crockett, released by Thee Headcoats on their 1990 album The Kids Are All Square.
- Hinds released a cover of Thee Headcoats' version of the tune in 2015.
