= Jul med Hep Stars =

Studio album by Hep Stars
- Released: December 1967
- Recorded: October – November 1967
- Studio: Europafilm Studio and Gustaf Vasa Church, Stockholm
- Genre: Pop; Christmas carol
- Label: Olga Records
- Producer: Gert Palmcrantz

Hep Stars chronology
The Hep Stars (1966)	Jul med Hep Stars (1967)	It's Been a Long Long Time (1968)

Jul med Hep Stars (Christmas with Hep Stars) is the third studio album by Swedish pop group Hep Stars, released through the Olga label. In 2001, it was rereleased by EMI. The album is made up by arrangements of well-known traditional Swedish Christmas songs mixed with somewhat newer tracks such as "Alla Sover Utom Jag".

== Track listing ==
Side one
No.	Title	Writer(s)	Length
1.	"Nu Är Det Jul Igen"	traditional; arranged by Hep Stars
2.	"Christmas Today"	Lars Berghagen
3.	"Alla Sover Utom Jag"	Berndt Öst; Berghagen
4.	"White Christmas"	Irving Berlin
5.	"Johanssons Boogie-Woogie Vals"	Povel Ramel
6.	"Jingle Bells"	James Lord Pierpont; arranged by Hep Stars

Side two
No.	Title	Writer(s)	Length
1.	"Hej Tomtegubbar"	traditional; arranged by Hep Stars
2.	"Christmas on My Mind"	Berry Bjärenäs
3.	"The Boy That Old Santa Forgot"	Kurt Foss; Reidar Bøe; Svenne Hedlund
4.	"Gläns Över Sjö Och Strand"	Alice Tegnér; Viktor Rydberg
5.	"Nu Tändas Tusen Juleljus"	Emmy Köhler; arranged by Hep Stars
6.	"Stilla Natt"	Franz Xaver Gruber; Edvard Evers; Arranged by Hep Stars
7.	"Dotter Sion"	Georg Friedrich Händel; arranged by Hep Stars
