= The Hep Stars (album) =

Studio album by Hep Stars
- Released: 19 December 1966
- Recorded: April – 4 December 1966
- Studio: Europafilm Studio, Stockholm
- Genre: pop music; freakbeat; psychedelic pop
- Length: 30:35
- Label: Olga Records
- Producer: Gert Palmcrantz

Hep Stars chronology
Hep Stars on Stage (1965)	The Hep Stars (1966)	Jul med Hep Stars (1967)

Singles from The Hep Stars
- 1. "Wedding" Released: May 1966; 2. "Consolation" Released: October 1966

The Hep Stars (also known as just Hep Stars) is the second studio album (and third overall album release) by Swedish pop group Hep Stars, released on 19 December 1966 on Åke Gerhard's Olga Records, carrying the catalogue number LPO 04. The album can be considered the band's musical breakthrough, as five out of twelve tracks are original compositions, and nine out of the twelve tracks had never previously been recorded by other bands.

Nonetheless, with over 40.000 copies of the album being sent to record stores across Scandinavia, it became a huge hit, reaching number 12 on Kvällstoppen in Sweden, number 5 on Norway's VG-lista and number 3 in Finland, where it stayed for two months. The album was later certified gold in Sweden after selling 25.000 copies.

== Material ==
In contrast to their heavier and more rhythm and blues based sound of their debut album We And Our Cadillac, songs on The Hep Stars varies between pop on songs such as "Lady Lady" to psychedelia on "Consolation". The album also marks keyboardist Benny Andersson's songwriting debut, as five tracks on it are credited to him. "Isn't It Easy To Say" is also the first collaboration by him and future ABBA-bandmate Björn Ulvaeus. The album features an English version of "Last Night I Had the Strangest Dream", a song Hep Stars previously had a hit with in Sweden with a Swedish translation called "I Natt Jag Drömde".

"No Time" was a song given to the band by Ulvaeus, since he had decided to record "Sunny Girl" for his band Hootenanny Singers' 1966 studio album Många Ansikten / Many Faces. It also features two hit singles, "Wedding" and "Consolation", which both reached peak position on the Kvällstoppen chart for 4 and 10 weeks respectively. The album itself peaked at number 12 on the same chart. Which at the time was a huge feat for an album, as it at the time was dominated by singles. This had only previously been achieved with the album Rubber Soul by the Beatles.

"Lady Lady" was released as a single in Belgium in 1968 by Columbia Records, backed by "Sunny Girl", a release which failed to chart. Both "The Birds In The Sky" and "Morning Comes After Night" had initially been recorded by a Swedish group called Vat 66 in 1966. These releases failed to chart. Vat 66 also recorded and released "Lady Lady" as a single in 1967.

== Track listing ==
Side one
No.	Title	Writer(s)	Length
1.	"No Time"	Björn Ulvaeus	2:48
2.	"The Birds In The Sky"	Berry Bjärenäs	3:12
3.	"Consolation"	Benny Andersson	3:29
4.	"Easy To Fool"	Berndt Öst; Peter Himmelstrand	2:34
5.	"Sound Of Eve"	Andersson	3:13
Total length:			15:16

Side two
No.	Title	Writer(s)	Length
1.	"Isn't It Easy To Say"	Andersson; Ulvaeus	3:00
2.	"Lady Lady"	Andersson	1:54
3.	"Last Night I Had the Strangest Dream"	Ed McCurdy	2:22
4.	"Morning Comes After Night"	Bjärenäs	2:15
5.	"I've Said It All Before"	Chris Arnold; David Martin; Geoff Morrow	2:50
6.	"Wedding"	Andersson; Svenne Hedlund	2:58
Total length:			15:19

1996 Bonus tracks
No.	Title	Writer(s)	Original release	Length
7.	"Sunny Girl"	Andersson	Single A-Side, 1966	2:23
8.	"Hawaii"	Brian Wilson; Mike Love	B-Side of 'Sunny Girl', 1966	1:30
9.	"When My Blue Moon Turns To Gold Again"	Wiley Walker; Gene Sullivan	B-Side of 'Wedding', 1966	2:47
10.	"I Natt Jag Drömde"	Ed McCurdy; Cornelis Vreeswijk	Single A-Side, 1966	2:19
11.	"Jag Vet"	Bengt Sigurd; Carl Stutz	B-side of 'I Natt Jag Drömde', 1966	3:23
12.	"Don't"	Jerry Leiber; Mike Stoller	B-side of 'Consolation', 1966	3:08
13.	"Malaika"	Adam Salim	Single A-Side, 1967	2:49
14.	"It's Nice To Be Back"	Andersson	B-Side of 'Malaika', 1967	2:34
Total length:				20:53

== Personnel ==
Hep Stars

- Svenne Hedlund – lead vocals, percussion
- Janne Frisk – rhythm and lead guitar, backing vocals
- Lennart Hegland – bass guitar, backing vocals
- Benny Andersson – various keyboard instruments, backing vocals
- Christer Pettersson – drums, percussion, backing vocals

Additional personnel

- Lennart Fernholm – bass guitar
- Gert Palmcrantz – producer

== Charts ==
Weekly chart performance for The Hep Stars
Chart (1966–1967)	Peak position
Finnish Soumen virallinen Albums	4
Norwegian VG-lista Albums	9
Swedish Kvällstoppen Chart	12
