= Should I (song) =

1965 song written by Chad Stuart and Jeremy Clyde

- Reversed single sleeve

Single by Chad & Jeremy

from the album I Don't Want to Lose You Baby
- A-side: "I Have Dreamed"
- Released: 22 September 1965
- Recorded: 1 February – 24 June 1965
- Genre: Folk rock; soft rock
- Length: 2:55
- Label: Columbia
- Songwriters: Chad Stuart; Jeremy Clyde
- Producer: Lor Crane

Chad & Jeremy singles chronology
"September in the Rain" (1965)	"Should I" (1965)	"Teenage Failure" (1966)

"Should I" is a song written by Chad Stuart and Jeremy Clyde, first recorded by their duo Chad & Jeremy as the B-side to "I Have Dreamed", which became a top-100 hit in the US. The song was arranged by Stuart and was included a week later on their fourth studio album I Don't Want to Lose You Baby.

The best known rendition of the track was by Swedish rock band the Hep Stars, who recorded "Should I" as their ninth single in late 1965. This rendition reached the top-5 on the Swedish sales chart Kvällstoppen and radio show Tio i Topp.

== Chad & Jeremy version ==
"Should I" was initially recorded as the B-Side to "I Have Dreamed", a song written by songwriting duo Rodgers and Hammerstein for The King and I. Columbia Records decided that they had to write an original composition on the B-Side, a song which later became "Should I." "I Have Dreamed" initially released on Columbia on 22 September 1965. The song, along with most of I Don't Want to Lose You Baby was recorded between 1 February – 24 June 1965. "I Have Dreamed" failed to make a major impact on the charts, reaching only number 91 on the Billboard Hot 100, staying on the charts for two weeks. It peaked at number 97 on Cashbox magazine on 16 October 1965. "Should I", although a B-Side charted on Cashbox as well, reaching number 100 for a week. The single fared best on the Easy Listening chart, where it reached number 22.

On 27 September of that same year, "Should I" was included on the duo's fourth studio album I Don't Want to Lose You Baby. The song was one of only two originals on the album, the other being "The Woman in You" The song, which is in C-major, opens with an electric and acoustic guitar before piano appears drastically. Chad and Jeremy then starts harmonizing together. The contemporary lyrics regards a complicated relationship, in which the narrator questions whether he should break up with his partner, as implied by the opening verse:

Should I tell you after all that we've been through. Should I tell you, even though you don't want me to. Should I tell you goodbye? Should I?

— Chad Stuart and Jeremy Clyde, "Should I"

In the second verse, the narrator reflects on whether he should give the partner a second chance on the relationship

Could you show me a way out of this misery? Could you show me any way to set me free? Should I tell you goodbye? Should I?

— Chad Stuart and Jeremy Clyde, "Should I"

The third verse reveals that the narrator has been cruel towards the partner for reasons unknown, though he dubs them "to be kind" and "for the best." This lines is ambiguous for the listener as to if the narrator actually is abusive or is only implied to be

You know it's been a long, long time, We've been together, don't you know I'm only being cruel to be kind? Don't think badly of me, it's for the best, don't you see?

— Chad Stuart and Jeremy Clyde, "Should I"

=== Personnel ===
Chad & Jeremy

- Chad Stuart – harmony lead vocals, electric guitar, harmonica
- Jeremy Clyde – harmony lead vocals, acoustic guitar

Other musicians

- Hal Blaine – drums
- James William Guercio – bass guitar
- Larry Knechtel – piano

== Hep Stars version ==
"Should I"

Single by the Hep Stars
- B-side: "I'll Never Quite Get Over You"
- Released: December 1965
- Recorded: December 1965
- Studio: Europafilm Studios, Stockholm
- Genre: Folk rock; pop
- Length: 2:56
- Label: Olga
- Songwriters: Stuart; Clyde
- Producer: Gert Palmcrantz

The Hep Stars singles chronology
"So Mystifying" (1965)	"Should I" (1965)	"Sunny Girl" (1966)

Swedish rock group Hep Stars recorded "Should I" as their ninth single in December 1965. The recording was produced by Gert Palmcrantz, who had produced all of their recordings since "Bald Headed Woman" in June 1965. Following the rather disappointing chart positions of "So Mystifying" (a song which had only reached number 5 on Kvällstoppen, unlike all their previous charting singles which had reached the top-3) the band returned to Europafilm Studios to record a follow-up to it. The group had previously heard "Should I" on the radio and decided to record it. The recording features Benny Andersson on Harpsichord and electric organ while Svenne Hedlund and guitarist Janne Frisk share lead vocals. Bassist Lennart Hegland was not present on the recording, as he had been substituted on bass by Lennart Fernholm for all recordings since "Bald Headed Woman".

Olga Records released "Should I" as a single shortly after it was recorded in December 1965; it was their final of eight singles released that year. "Should I" first entered Kvällstoppen on 28 December 1965 at number 10. The following week it had ascended to number 13 before climbing in to the top-5 for the first time at a position of number 4. The following week it reached number 3 before finally peaking at number 2 on the week ending 25 January 1966. The week after it reached number 6. On 8 February 1966 it had reached number 9, a position it held for two weeks before exiting the top-10 the following week at number 17. The week after it had descended to number 16. It was last seen on 8 March at a position of 17. In total, the single stayed on the charts for 11 weeks, of which 7 were in the top-10 and 4 were in the top-5. The single fared similarly well on Tio i Topp, where it reached number 3, staying on the chart for two weeks.

The single was the last in a string of covers recorded as singles, as the following track "Sunny Girl" was written by Benny Andersson. It had the catalogue number of SO 17. The B-Side was "I'll Never Quite Get Over You", which had previously appeared on Hep Stars debut album We and Our Cadillac. "Should I" was never included on any of the Hep Stars albums, but was later issued as a bonus track on 1996 remasters of their live album Hep Stars on Stage. Bruce Eder of AllMusic states that "They had a decent if slightly smooth garage band style, Andersson's organ and Frisk's guitar paired up very nicely on the breaks"

=== Personnel ===
Hep Stars

- Svenne Hedlund – harmony lead vocals
- Janne Frisk – guitar, harmony lead vocals
- Christer Pettersson – drums, backing vocals
- Benny Andersson – harpsichord, electric organ

Other personnel

- Lennart Fernholm – bass guitar
- Gert Palmcrantz – producer

=== Charts ===
Chart (1965–1966)	Peak position
Sweden (Kvällstoppen)	2
Sweden (Tio i Topp)	3
