= Should I =

Should I or Should I? may refer to:

- "Should I" (song), a 1965 song by Chad & Jeremy, later covered by the Hep Stars
- "Should I?" (song), a song from the 1930 film Lord Byron of Broadway
- "Should I?", a song by Rihanna featuring J-Status from the 2006 album A Girl like Me

== See also ==
- Should I Stay or Should I Go (disambiguation)
