= Sunny Girl (song) =

Single by the Hep Stars
- B-side: "Hawaii"
- Released: March 1966
- Recorded: March 1966
- Studio: Europafilm Studios, Stockholm
- Genre: Soft rock; baroque pop
- Length: 2:23
- Label: Olga
- Songwriter: Benny Andersson
- Producer: Gert Palmcrantz

Hep Stars singles chronology
"Should I" (1965)	"Sunny Girl" (1966)	"Wedding" (1966)

1968 Dutch release

Music video
- "Sunny Girl" (audio) on YouTube

"Sunny Girl" is a song written by Benny Andersson, which was recorded and released as the Swedish rock group Hep Stars' tenth single in March 1966. Their second original song after "No Response", it was the song which made Andersson believe in himself as a songwriter, with support from their manager Åke Gerhard. As a result, almost all singles by the Hep Stars following "Sunny Girl" are original compositions.

Nonetheless, the single became a huge success in Sweden, reaching number 1 on both Kvällstoppen and Tio i Topp, their first to do so since "Bald Headed Woman" in mid-1965. It was the Hep Stars only top-10 single outside of the Nordic countries, as it reached number 4 in the Netherlands in 1968. Another Swedish group, the Telstars, reached Svensktoppen with a translation of the song in September 1966. Andersson has since stated dislike for the lyrics.

== Background ==
In 1965 alone, the Hep Stars had accumulated six top-10 singles, of which three were number ones. However, most of this material were covers, and the band had been heavily criticized by Swedish media and other bands for this. So Andersson introduced them "No Response", which was his first composition. The song was a success, reaching number 2 on Kvällstoppen in October 1965. However, the following single was "So Mystifying" written by Ray Davies of the Kinks, which once again brought them back to recording covers as singles, largely because Andersson was not satisfied with "No Response", which made him doubt his songwriting talents. "So Mystifying" and the follow-up, "Should I", still became hits on Kvällstoppen, reaching number 5 and 2 respectively.

Hep Stars were still doing heavy touring across Sweden during this time, but as they were almost equally as successful in Norway, they embarked on a tour there as well. On 10 February 1966, they arrived at Vinger Hotel in Kongsvinger. After unpacking and checking in to their rooms, the band sans Andersson went to the restaurant inside the establishment. Andersson however, went to the ballroom of the hotel, lit up several candles and started playing his piano. After several hours, he had come up with the melody of "Sunny Girl". In comparison to "No Response", "Sunny Girl" was a huge leap forward for the band, because unlike the rock and roll influenced "No Response", "Sunny Girl" drew inspiration from Classical music and is as a result baroque pop.

"Sunny Girl" was reportedly inspired by Andersson's girlfriend at the time, who was Norwegian. It was not originally a slow-drawn out ballad. Andersson had envisioned a faster version of the song. However, Hep Stars sound engineer Gert Palmcrantz suggested that he'd play the spinet, something he agreed on and promptly slowed down the arrangement of the song. Andersson later admitted that he was heavily influenced by classical music on both "Sunny Girl" and the follow-up "Wedding". "Sunny Girl" was introduced to their manager Åke Gerhard, who saw great potential in Andersson as a songwriter, and who liked the track. It was recorded in March 1966 at Europafilm Studios with Palmcrantz producing.

== Release and commercial performance ==
The band did not initially agree on releasing "Sunny Girl" as a single, as drummer Christer Pettersson and guitarist Janne Frisk were not too fond of the slow-baroque sound that the single had produced; all their previous singles had been high-tempoed rock or rhythm and blues recordings. However, Andersson, singer Svenne Hedlund and bassist Lennart Hegland liked the song. The members would eventually agree for the single to be released, and in March 1966, "Sunny Girl" was released by Olga Records with the catalogue number SO 21.

Heavily promoted, the single entered Kvällstoppen on 15 March 1966 at a position of number 15. The following week it had for the first time entered the top-10, at number 7. The week after it had reached number 6 and on 5 April it had reached the top-5 for the first time, at number 3, almost a year after their first charting single. On 12 April, it reached number 1 on the charts, a position which it held for 5 weeks, before finally leaving on the week ending 17 May where it was at number 2, a position it held for two weeks. The week after, it had ascended to number 4, with number 5 following the next week. On 14 June, it had exited the top-5 for the first time at number 8, and the following week it left the top-10 at number 12. "Sunny Girl" was last seen on the chart on 28 June at a position of number 14. In total, the single spent 16 weeks on the charts, of which 13 were in the top-10, 10 were in the top-5 and 5 at number 1. The single was equally successful on Tio i Topp, where it was voted number 1 on 2 April, a position it held for six weeks. In total, the record stayed on Tio i Topp for 14 weeks, their most successful single on that chart.

After being played repeatedly on Radio Luxembourg, the single gained traction in the Netherlands almost two years later. For most international releases outside of the Nordic countries, they were issued by Decca Records, but with few exceptions as they were issued by Olga in the Netherlands. In the Netherlands, the single was backed by "No Response". The single entered the charts on 13 July 1968 at a position of number 18. The following week, it had reached number 14. On 27 July, it had reached the top-10 for the first time at number 8. The following week, it entered the top-5 for the first time and reached its peak of number 4, a position which it held for two weeks. On 17 August, the single had exited the top-5 at number 10, a position it also held for two weeks. The single was last seen on 31 August at number 17 before exiting the chart. In total, it spent 8 weeks on the chart, of which 5 were in the top-10 and two were in the top-5. "Sunny Girl" became the Hep Stars only successful release outside the Nordic countries, as clashes between Olga Records and Decca Records hindered virtually any records to be released outside of the Nordics, successfully terminating their international career.

The single was also hugely successful on Norway's chart, VG-lista, and became their first charting single on there since "Bald Headed Woman" The single entered the chart at number 9 on 16 April 1966. The following week, it had reached number 8, a position it held for two weeks. On 7 May that year, it had climbed to number 6, and by the following week it had entered the top-5 for the first time, at its peak of number 4. The following week it ascended to number 5, before once again reaching number 4 on 28 May that year. The week after it ascended to number 6, a position it held for two weeks, and was last seen on the chart on 18 June that year at a position of number 7. In total, the single spent ten weeks on the chart, of which all were in the top-10 and three were in the top-5. The B-Side of "Sunny Girl" was a cover of the Beach Boys "Hawaii", which was recorded as a joke (in similar fashion to that of their debut single "Kana Kapila"). A reversed single sleeve which by accident meant that "Hawaii" became the A-side was released. This release managed to actually chart on Kvällstoppen before being recalled. It entered the chart on 15 March 1966 at number 15 before reaching its peak of number 7 the following week. It exited that same date after only two weeks on the chart.

== Reception and legacy ==
Upon British release, the single gained favorable reviews. In a review for Record Mirror, Norman Jopling and Peter Jones considered the song "open", noting the harpsichord found on the song. However, they also found the song unoccupied.

In retrospect, Benny Andersson has stated that the writing of "Sunny Girl" made him physically feel good inside, and made him believe in himself as a serious songwriter after it reached number 1 on Tio i Topp. Realizing that it had reached number 1, he started crying. On a bench in a dressing room in Kungsbacka, Andersson decided to dedicate his life to songwriting after this. He has stated that the feeling of physical gratification has been achieved every time he writes a song, ever since "Sunny Girl". Andersson stated that "Sunny Girl" was the first song which he wrote that he considered good, as opposed to "No Response" which he considered throwaway. In a review for his Andersson's 2017 solo album Piano, Jens Peterson of Aftonbladet writes that "Sunny Girl" easily could have been included on the album as it fits right in with the moody, baroque melodies present on the album.

"Sunny Girl" caused a resurgence in Hep Stars popularity, gaining them their first number 1 since "Bald Headed Woman", and led the following singles "Wedding", "Consolation" and "Malaika" to also reach number 1. However, Andersson has stated that he was not satisfied with the lyrics, which he comprehends as misogynic. Nonetheless, "Sunny Girl" became a huge hit, and is together with "Cadillac" and "I Natt Jag Drömde" considered to be Hep Stars signature songs. Svenne Hedlund, Hep Stars frontman and lead singer, has on multiple occasions stated that "Sunny Girl" was his favorite recording by Hep Stars. Although not released on the original version, "Sunny Girl" was issued on the 1996 remaster of their eponymous second studio album (and third overall released) The Hep Stars.

== Personnel ==
=== Hep Stars ===
- Svenne Hedlund – lead vocals
- Janne Frisk – guitar, backing vocals
- Lennart Hegland – backing vocals
- Benny Andersson – spinett
- Christer Pettersson – tambourine

=== Additional personnel ===
- Lennart Fernholm – bass guitar
- Gert Palmcrantz – producer

== Chart positions ==
=== Weekly charts ===
Chart (1966)	Peak position
Sweden (Kvällstoppen)	1
Sweden (Tio i Topp)"	1
Norway (VG-lista)	4
Finland (The Official Finnish Charts)	10

Chart (1968)	Peak position
Netherlands (Single Top 100)	4

=== All-time charts ===
Chart	Rank
Netherlands (Single Top 100)	5706

== Covers ==
- The same year, a recording by Hootenanny Singers was released on their album Många ansikten/Many Faces in October 1966, in one of the earliest collaborations between Benny Andersson and Björn Ulvaeus, who would later give "No Time" to Hep Stars, which they recorded for their third album The Hep Stars in late 1966.
- Another Swedish rock band, the Telstars, recorded the song and released it as a single in mid-1966 with the alternate title "Fröken Sunny Girl" ("miss Sunny Girl"), with "En Liten Snobb", (a Swedish translation of the Kinks "Dedicated Follower of Fashion") as the B-side. This release charted on Svensktoppen on 17 September 1966 at a position of number 10, which it held for one week before being replaced by "Kristallen den fina" by the Wayfarers.
