= Tribute to Buddy Holly =

1961 song written by Geoff Goddard

- 1963 EP release

Single by Mike Berry with the Outlaws

from the EP A Tribute to Buddy Holly
- B-side: "What's the Matter"
- Released: 1 September 1961
- Recorded: 1961
- Genre: Rock and roll; pop
- Length: 2:56
- Label: His Master's Voice
- Songwriter: Geoff Goddard
- Producer: Joe Meek

Mike Berry with the Outlaws singles chronology
"Will You Love Me Tomorrow" (1961)	"Tribute to Buddy Holly" (1961)	"It's Just a Matter of Time" (1962)

"Tribute to Buddy Holly" (also recorded as "A Tribute to Buddy Holly") is a song written by Geoff Goddard, first recorded by Mike Berry and the Outlaws as a single, which was released in September 1961 on His Master's Voice records. His first chart success, it reached number 24 on the UK Singles Chart in November 1961. The song was banned by the BBC for being too "morbid", regarding the death of 1950s rock and roll singer Buddy Holly, who died in a plane crash on 3 February 1959.

Nonetheless, it started Berry's singing career and is one of his signature songs. Chad Allan and the Reflections, a band that would later become the Guess Who, recorded "Tribute to Buddy Holly" as their debut single in 1962, after hearing Berry's version. Another Canadian rock band, the Esquires, incorporated the song in their "Buddy Holly Medley" (which also features "Peggy Sue", "That'll Be the Day" and "Think It Over") on their only studio album Introducing The Esquires. Swedish rock band Hep Stars released the song as their second single in 1965, and became their first significant chart success.

== Mike Berry version ==
On 3 February 1959, a plane chartered by Holly during the "Winter Dance Party" crashed on a field near Clear Lake, Iowa, which killed Holly, Ritchie Valens, Jiles Perry "The Big Bopper" Richardson and pilot Roger Peterson. Many artists looked up to Holly and paid their respects to him by writing songs, including Berry and the Outlaws. Joe Meek, producer of the session, claimed to have contact with Holly's spirit which helped him write songs. Meek would later end up committing a murder–suicide on the 1967 anniversary of Holly's death.

The song was written by Meek's business associate Geoff Goddard, who had Berry in mind while writing the song. The single was released on His Master's Voice on 1 September 1961, and entered the UK Singles Chart on 18 October 1961, before peaking at number 24, a position it held for two weeks in November 1961. It was last seen on the chart on 22 November 1961, at a position of 42. However, rumours started circulating that the BBC had banned the single, due to the subject matter being too morbid; Holly had died only two years prior. "Tribute to Buddy Holly" was Berry's first single released in the US, but failed to chart.

"Tribute to Buddy Holly" was the title track of an EP recorded by Berry, which was released in June 1963. A re-recording of the song was done in 1975, after his rendition of "Don't Be Cruel" had reached number 14 in the Netherlands. This cover reached number 2 on the Netherlands Nationale Hitparade, staying on the charts for eight weeks. It was also successful in Belgium, where it reached number 3 and stayed on the charts for ten weeks.

=== Personnel ===
- Mike Berry – lead vocals

The Outlaws

- Billy Kuy – lead guitar
- Bobby Graham – drums
- Chas Hodges – bass guitar
- Reg Hawkins – rhythm guitar

=== Chart positions ===
Chart (1961)	Peak position
UK Singles (Official Charts Company)	24

Chart (1975)	Peak position
Netherlands (Nationale Hitparade)	2
Belgium (Ultratop)	3

== Chad Allan and the Reflections version ==
"Tribute to Buddy Holly"

Single by Chad Allan and the Reflections
- B-side: "Back and Forth"
- Released: December 1962
- Recorded: 1962
- Studio: Kay Bank (Minneapolis, Minnesota)
- Genre: Rock and roll
- Length: 2:56
- Label: Canadian-American
- Songwriter: Goddard
- Producer: Bob Burns

Chad Allan and the Reflections singles chronology
"Tribute to Buddy Holly" (1962)	"Shy Guy" (1963)

Canadian rock band Chad Allan and the Reflections recorded the song as their debut single in 1962, a cover of Mike Berry's 1960 original. Randy Bachman, lead guitarist of the band, recalled that he and some friends were going to drive to Buddy Holly's show in Fargo, North Dakota, when the news of his death emerged. Dissatisfied with Winnipeg recording studios, the Reflections decided to record "Tribute to Buddy Holly" at Kay Bank Studios in Minneapolis, Minnesota, because, as Bachman recalled, the Trashmen's "Surfin' Bird" was recorded there. However, "Surfin Bird" was recorded and released in 1963, a year after "Tribute to Buddy Holly" had been released. The recording studio also had three-track equipment, something not present in Winnipeg studios at the time.

The sessions took place in late 1962, with the band traveling to the United States in a Buick lent by Bachman's girlfriend's father. A box trailer was used to haul their equipment, packed in Bachman's father's canvas tent. When the band arrived at the studios, Chad Allan had sore throat and felt sick, and the electronics in Bachman's Gretsch electric guitar malfunctioned. While Allan played the Gretsch acoustically, Bachman was left to play Allan's recently purchased Fender Jazzmaster. Despite Allen's sickness and Bachman's disappointment in the sound of the Jazzmaster, they managed to record "four or five" tracks.

"Tribute to Buddy Holly" was released as a single on Canadian-American Records in December 1962. There was a mix-up with the master tapes, leading to a Chad Allan original "I Just Didn't Have the Heart" to be labeled "Tribute to Buddy Holly" on the first several hundred pressings of the single. "Tribute to Buddy Holly" was locally successful, reaching the top-10 on Winnipeg radio station CKY in 1963. However, the single failed to attract national attention. It was their only single on the Canadian-American label, with the group signing Quality Records for their follow-up record "Shy Guy". In 1965, the band changed their name to "Chad Allan and the Expressions" after securing a number 1 hit with "Shakin' All Over".

=== Personnel ===
- Chad Allan – lead vocals, rhythm guitar
- Randy Bachman – lead guitar
- Bob Ashley – keyboards
- Jim Kale – bass guitar
- Garry Peterson – drums

== Hep Stars version ==
"A Tribute to Buddy Holly"

Single by the Hep Stars
- B-side: "Bird Dog"
- Released: February 1965
- Recorded: December 1964
- Studio: Borgarskolan, Stockholm
- Length: 2:50
- Label: Olga
- Songwriter: Goddard
- Producer: Åke Gerhard

The Hep Stars singles chronology
"Kana Kapila" (1964)	"A Tribute to Buddy Holly" (1965)	"Summertime Blues" (1965)

Swedish rock group Hep Stars recorded "Tribute to Buddy Holly" as their second single in December 1964. For the release, the song was retitled to "A Tribute to Buddy Holly". The sessions, which were the first by Benny Andersson, who would later go on to ABBA fame, were held in the assembly hall of Borgarskolan in Stockholm. The song was recorded in a six-hour session which also produced "Summertime Blues", Farmer John", "Bird Dog" "If You Need Me" and "Donna". All of these were intended for single release sometime in 1965, but were delayed. At the time, Hep Stars had only recorded one other single, "Kana Kapila", which only reached number 26 on Tio i Topp in 1964.

Hep Stars version of the song is a radical departure from Berry's original in the opening. Berry's version opens with a guitar strum, while Hep Stars version opens with a drum beat played by drummer Christer Pettersson (not to be confused with Olof Palme murder suspect Christer Pettersson). The Hep Stars version also substitutes several guitar licks found throughout Berry's version with whistling, by regular lead vocalist Svenne Hedlund. Unlike almost all other recordings by Hep Stars, where Hedlund is the lead vocalist, "A Tribute to Buddy Holly" features their guitarist Janne Frisk on lead vocals. Frisk had previously acted as the lead vocalist before Hedlund joined the band. "A Tribute to Buddy Holly", along with the follow-up "Summertime Blues" were the only singles to feature Frisk on lead vocals.

Olga Records released "A Tribute to Buddy Holly" as a single in February 1965. While it initially failed to chart, it managed to gain tractions later, in April. It first entered Kvällstoppen on 20 April 1965 at a position of number 15. It first entered the top-10 two weeks later, at number 10. The following week, it ascended to number 11 before entering the top-5 the following week at number 5. It peaked at number 5 for a week before climbing to number 6, where it stayed for two weeks. The following week it was at number 7 and on 15 June it had exited the top-10 at number 11. It was last seen on the charts the following week at a position of number 16. In total, the song had spent 10 weeks on the charts, of which 5 were in the top-10 and 1 was in the top-5.

It fared similarly well on Tio i Topp, where it reached number 4. "A Tribute to Buddy Holly" is notable because it, along with "Farmer John" and "Cadillac" occupied the first, second and fourth position of that chart, only broken by "Ticket to Ride" by the Beatles at number three. This was a huge feat at the time, never broken by anyone else. Bruce Eder of AllMusic states that ""Tribute to Buddy Holly" was a less dramatic rendition of the song than Mike Berry's version."

=== Personnel ===
- Svenne Hedlund – whistling, backing vocals
- Janne Frisk – lead vocals, guitar
- Benny Andersson – keyboards
- Christer Pettersson – drums, backing vocals
- Lennart Hegland – bass guitar

=== Charts ===
Chart (1965)	Peak position
Sweden (Kvällstoppen)	5
Sweden (Tio i Topp)	4
Finland (The Official Finnish Charts)	28
