= Subo =

Subo, or SuBo, may refer to:

- An embroidered Bojagi, a traditional Korean wrapping cloth
- An album track on The Weavers at Carnegie Hall Vol. 2, by The Weavers
- SuBo, nickname of Scottish singer Susan Boyle
