= Wedding (song) =

1966 Hep Stars song

Single by the Hep Stars

from the album The Hep Stars
- B-side: "When My Blue Moon Turns to Gold Again"
- Released: May 1966
- Recorded: April 1966
- Studio: Philips Studios, Stockholm
- Genre: Pop rock; baroque pop
- Length: 2:48
- Label: Olga
- Songwriters: Benny Andersson; Svenne Hedlund
- Producer: Gert Palmcrantz

Hep Stars singles chronology
"Sunny Girl" (1966)	"Wedding" (1966)	"I Natt Jag Drömde" (1966)

"Wedding" is a song written by Swedish musicians Benny Andersson and Svenne Hedlund, first recorded as the eleventh single by their group the Hep Stars in May 1966. "Wedding" was the second single in which the Hep Stars ventured into baroque pop, something that they'd done on their previous single "Sunny Girl" in March 1966.

Upon release, "Wedding" continued the Hep Stars chart success, reaching number 1 on both Kvällstoppen and Tio i Topp that same year. The song was later included in altered form as the final track on their eponymous second studio album The Hep Stars in December 1966. As a result of this, "Wedding" became the Hep Stars first single to be mixed in true stereo.

== Background and recording ==
In March 1966, the Hep Stars released "Sunny Girl" as a single, a song which was written by Andersson and was a departure from their previous rock and rhythm and blues influences, instead dabbling into baroque pop. "Sunny Girl" became their first self-written song since 1965's "No Response", and was hugely successful on Kvällstoppen and Tio i Topp, reaching number 1 on both of them, topping the charts for several weeks. However, the success of "Sunny Girl" had led Andersson on a quest to become a respected songwriter. Even before the single had exited the charts, Andersson had already started working on a follow-up to the song. They were by this point still heavily touring Swedish Folkparks, which brought them to a man named Valter Pettersson in Falkenberg, Halland, who had lent them his house for 10 days where they rehearsed for these concerts.

Pettersson also managed to gain access to Skrea Church, located in Skrea, a bit away from Falkenberg, something he told Andersson. Andersson took this opportunity and played on the church organ during nighttime, with an increased interest in classical music along with corresponding artists, something attributed to Pettersson. Andersson had started writing on the melody before introducing it to Hedlund, who liked the sound of it; the remaining parts of the composition and the majority of all lyrics were written in Pettersson's house. Andersson composed the majority of the introduction, middle eight and ending, while Hedlund contributed with other parts of the composition.

The parts that are perhaps the most important in the song, the introduction, the middle part and the finish, he wrote himself. But the rest of the melody was pretty much 50-50, and the lyrics as well.

— Svenne Hedlund, in Carl Magnus Palm, Benny's Road to ABBA, page 112

Andersson and Hedlund became a highly productive songwriting partnership, despite only writing a handful of songs. Considering this, Andersson largely took help from Hedlund in writing lyrics, due to Andersson not grasping the language completely. According to Hedlund, not all parts of the song were finished in Pettersson's house; some parts were written while the Hep Stars were on tour.

We had a lot of fun when we wrote that song, we sat one night at the bar at the Hotel Opalen in Gothenburg and wrote the lyrics, which took quite some time. I remember that we were very pleased with ourselves.

— Svenne Hedlund, in Carl Magnus Palm, Benny's Road to ABBA, page 112-113

"Wedding" was first recorded in April 1966 at Philips Studio in Stockholm. For this recording, Andersson wanted to achieve perfection, and as a result asked sound engineer and producer Gert Palmcrantz to help him achieve a sound, and as a result, "Wedding" became the first recording in which Palmcrantz had taken a major part in the sound direction of the recording, something that he hadn't done before. Similarly to "Sunny Girl", the group had experimented with several different sounds they wanted to attain. "Wedding" was one of the first songs recorded by the band in which they wanted sophistication in their sound; their earlier recordings had been done as similar to the corresponding live versions as possible. For the song, Andersson wanted the sound of the organ to emulate that of one found in a church; as a result of this, they moved a Hammond B3 organ into the studio's echo chamber.

== Release ==
=== Versions ===
Three versions of "Wedding" were overall released. These versions were similar to each other, with only some lyrical discrepancies in two of the versions. The first version is the designated single version, which was recorded in April 1966. When first issued as a single, the solo ending riff played unaccompanied by Andersson is cut, (which is repeated once again, but with the entire band playing their respective instruments. This part remains in the single version) effectively removing approximately 10 seconds of the recording. This rendition also features a faulty lyric: "Wedding today, now's the time when fun is over. Please help to find, half a million four leaf clover." which appears as the opening verse. In other versions, this is the closing verse. Strangely, in this version that line is played twice, both during the opening and closing verses. This version was first issued on CD in 1988 when the compilation album Tio i topp - Volym 4: 1965-67 was released. It is also featured on the UK compilation Like We Used To: The Anthology 1965-1967.

The second version of "Wedding" has overdubbed vocals reinstating the original opening verse: "Wedding today, all the people running wild to see, Me go down the isle with my bride to fall down on my knee", with the faulty opening verse still appearing as the closing verse. Other notable changes are that the original organ outro is played twice (once solo by Andersson, and the second time with the entire band.) This version is the standard version which appeared on The Hep Stars and most other compilation albums, including Hep Stars, 1964-69! and Cadillac Madness. The third version was the international single release in which Hedlund again sings the faulty opening verse, but that the organ outro is still played twice (again, once solo by Andersson, and the second time with the entire band.). Territories in which this version was released include the United Kingdom, Netherlands, West Germany, Italy and Spain. This is by far the rarest of the three versions, and the only one that has yet been released digitally.

=== Release ===
The band was initially unsure on whether they wanted to release "Wedding" as a single, similarly to the situation with "Sunny Girl". Andersson would later tell this to a reporter: "It was only Svenne and I who wanted to record "Wedding", the others thought it was too complicated." This was most likely due to the fact that "Wedding" further strayed the band away from their rhythm and blues and rock roots. The band eventually came to an agreement, and in May 1966, "Wedding" was issued as a single by Olga Records under the catalogue number SO 25. The B-side was "When My Blue Moon Turns to Gold Again", a song that had previously been recorded by Elvis Presley for his eponymous album Elvis in 1956, an artist that Hedlund greatly admired and often tried to imitate. This rendition of "When My Blue Moon Turns to Gold Again" feature The Jordanaires-esque backing vocals by the band, something not present on any other recordings by the group.

"Wedding" first entered Kvällstoppen on 24 May at a position of number 7. The following week it had reached the top-5 for the first time, ascending all the way to number 1, occupying the top spot for four weeks before being knocked out by "Paperback Writer" by the Beatles on 28 June. Nonetheless, the single would go on to stay at number 2 between 28 June and 12 July 1966, a whole three weeks. The following week, "Wedding" had descended to number 5 and by 26 July it had exited the top-5 at number 7. On 2 August, it was at number 9 and by the following week it had exited the top-5 for the first time, at a position of number 11, a position it held for two weeks. By 23 August, it had reached number 12, and the week after it was at number 14. The last two weeks "Wedding" was on the chart it was on number 17, leaving on 13 September 1966. In total, "Wedding" became their fifth number 1 single on the chart. It stayed on the charts for 17 weeks, of which 11 were in the top-10 and 8 were in the top-5. It was equally as successful on Tio i Topp, staying on the chart for 7 weeks, peaking at number 1 for 3 of those weeks.

The single was also successful on neighboring country Norway's VG-lista, staying on there for 3 weeks, peaking at number 8. It entered the chart on 11 June 1966 at a position of number 9, before peaking at number 8 the following week, a position it held for two weeks. It exited the chart on 25 June. "Wedding" was the penultimate single by Hep Stars to chart, with "I Natt Jag Drömde" becoming their final to chart in Norway. The single sleeve photo was taken by Rolf Håkansson at Skrea Church, where Benny first wrote the track. The single failed to chart outside Scandinavia, something that Hedlund attributes to the lyrics: "You mustn't sing things like that about the holy matrimony! But we were stubborn and didn't want to change the lyrics." This is due to the fact that the lyrics implies that the narrator isn't to keen on a stable relationship. As Hedlund would later state: "We were all young anyway and didn't have a thought of getting married."

=== Reception and legacy ===
"Wedding" became, along with "Cadillac", "Sunny Girl" and "I Natt Jag Drömde" one of the Hep Stars biggest hits and is considered one of their best songs. The success of the single led to it being featured in an alternate version, which is approximately 10 seconds longer, on their second studio album (third overall release) The Hep Stars. It is one of two singles on the album, along with "Consolation" and is the closing track. The single would eventually be re-recorded by the Hep Stars 50 years later for the album 50th Anniversary 1964-2014. The song was played by Andersson on Björn Ulvaeus and Agnetha Fältskog's wedding on 6 July 1971.

== Personnel ==
=== Hep Stars ===
- Svenne Hedlund – lead vocals
- Janne Frisk – guitar, backing vocals
- Lennart Hegland – backing vocals
- Benny Andersson – organ, backing vocals
- Christer Pettersson – drums, backing vocals

=== Additional personnel ===
- Lennart Fernholm – bass guitar
- Gert Palmcrantz – producer

It is unclear who played French horn, which appears during the chorus on the recording.

== Charts ==
Chart (1966)	Peak position
Sweden (Kvällstoppen)	1
Sweden (Tio i Topp)	1
Finland (The Official Finnish Charts	13
Norway (VG-lista)	8

== Covers ==
- It was covered by Swedish group Idolerna, a band which featured Hedlund. The song was a part of their repertoire, and a live version was recorded for Idolerna – Greatest Hits Live & More...
