= The Weavers at Carnegie Hall Vol. 2 =

The Weavers At Carnegie Hall Vol. 2

Live album by The Weavers
- Released: December 1960
- Recorded: April 1, 1960
- Genre: Folk
- Length: 44:48
- Label: Vanguard
- Producer: Harold Leventhal

The Weavers at Carnegie Hall Vol. 2 is a live album by the Weavers, released in December 1960. Because Lee Hays was off-microphone during much of the actual April 1960 Carnegie Hall concert, most of the songs on this album were from a Berkeley, California performance of the same material.

== Track listing ==
1. "On My Journey"
2. "Born in East Virginia"
3. "Bill Bailey Come Home"
4. "The Sinking of Reuben James"
5. "Good Old Bowling Green"
6. "There Once Was a Young Man Who Went to the City"
7. "Subo"
8. "Last Night I Had The Strangest Dream"
9. "Marching to Pretoria"
10. "Stewball"
11. "Below The Gallows Tree"
12. "Tapuach Hineni"
13. "Universal Folk Song"
14. "Run, Come, See Jerusalem"
15. "Buttermilk Hill"
16. "Amazing Grace"
17. "Virgin Mary"
18. "In That New Jerusalem"
