= Should I Stay or Should I Go (disambiguation) =

"Should I Stay or Should I Go" is a song by the English punk rock band The Clash.

Should I Stay or Should I Go or similar may also refer to:

- "Should I Stay or Should I Go", a song by Mack 10 from the album The Recipe
- "Should I Stay or Should I Go" (D:TNG episode), an episode of television series Degrassi: The Next Generation
- "Should I Stay or Should I Go?" (Faith in the Future), a 1995 television episode
- "Should I Stay Or Should I Go?", an episode of the Canadian drama Instant Star
- Should I Stay or Should I Go?, a book by Ramani Durvasula
