= Hep Stars =

Swedish pop/rock group

The Hep Stars
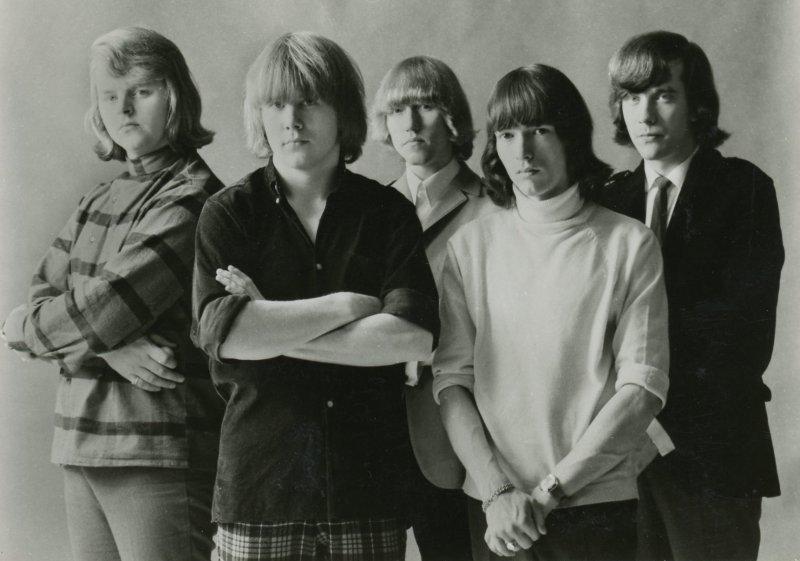
- Hep Stars in 1965. Left to right: Janne Frisk, Benny Andersson, Lennart Hegland, Svenne Hedlund, Christer Pettersson

Background information
- Origin: Stockholm, Sweden
- Genre: pop
- Years active: 1963–1971, 1977–1978, 1989–present
- Label: Olga
- Members: Lotta Hedlund; Jan-Olof Enbom; Bengt Arenblad; Totte Päivärinta
- Past members: Lennart Hegland (deceased); Janne Frisk; Christer Pettersson (deceased); Hans Östlund; Benny Andersson; Björn Ulvaeus; Kookie Tian; Josephine Tian; Svenne Hedlund (deceased)
- Website: thehepstars.se

The Hep Stars are a Swedish rock band formed in Stockholm in 1963. During 1965–1966 the band was the most successful of contemporary 1960s Swedish pop groups performing in the English language. Outside the Nordic countries the band is best known as a launching point for the keyboard player and composer Benny Andersson, who went on to enjoy worldwide success with ABBA.

The band was founded by the drummer Christer "Chrille" Pettersson (3 November 1942 – 27 August 2006) and the bass guitarist Lennart "Lelle" Hegland (9 January 1943 – 13 April 2022) with the keyboard player Hans Östlund and the lead/rhythm guitarist-singer Jan "Janne" Frisk (29 November 1943). At the height of their popularity, the line-up consisted of Hegland, Pettersson, Frisk, Sven Ove "Svenne" Hedlund on lead vocals (10 March 1945, Solna – 3 December 2022) and Benny Andersson on keyboards and lead guitarist.

== Beginnings ==
Originally, the band called themselves Quartet Yep. Their repertoire included various styles of music from Latin dance to rock in order to get as many gigs as possible in varying venues. Influenced mainly by Frisk, their music started to veer towards rock'n'roll and pop. The band decided a more intriguing name was in order and on Frisk's suggestion Hep Stars was chosen. The idea came from a line in the Bill Haley song "Razzle Dazzle" – "It's the hipster's dance" – with a slight alteration in written form. They started to get support gigs also closing after the headline act. A typical gig had them playing for around four hours with one set of rock.

Hegland called Hedlund to fill the singer's slot for Frisk who had temporarily joined a tour backing band for some extra money for a new guitar amp. The band quickly noticed Hedlund's abilities as both a singer and a frontman. On Frisk's return, they shared lead vocals for a period of time with Frisk singing the more straightforward rockers and Hedlund handling the ballads.

By the summer of 1964, they were performing to audiences of 2000. The rock scene took note of them after one evening in Nalen, the most important rock club in Sweden during the 1960s. The main act failed to appear and the Hep Stars, the support act, filled in to great acclaim, especially among rockers (or raggare as they were known in Sweden). Their reputation started to spread through word-of-mouth.

At this point, Hegland managed to persuade the music businessman and Olga-record label owner Åke Gerhard to be their manager.

After the group's first single ("Kana Kapila", 1964) the original keyboard player, Hans Östlund, was asked to leave because of relations growing sour, especially with Hedlund and founder member Pettersson, who left the band fed up with squabbles. He was asked to rejoin and the band continued as a four piece for a short time in autumn 1964.

Hedlund owned a van and occasionally drove other bands to gigs. One of these bands was Elverkets Spelmanslag so Hedlund saw Benny Andersson performing, making an impression with his quick runs and fill-ins. On Hedlund's suggestion, Andersson was called for an audition. In turn, Andersson had earlier read a tabloid article about the camping car Hep Stars used when touring, acquired for 100,000 kroner, which was large enough to hold both the band and the equipment. This assured him that Hep Stars had it going along with their assuring comments on the current scene.

The band had become what is considered to be the classic line-up: Sven Hedlund (vocals), Jan Frisk (guitar/vocals), Benny Andersson (keyboards), Lennart Hegland (bass guitar) and Christer Pettersson (drums). The fans were soon to absorb their nicknames Svenne, Janne, Benny, Lelle and Chrille.

== Breakthrough ==
Hep Stars recorded their next three singles in one six-hour session without overdubs on three-track equipment. They performed in the TV program Drop In in March 1965. In April, they had three songs in the radio playlist top 4 at the same time: "Cadillac", "Farmer John" and "A Tribute To Buddy Holly". On the sales chart "Cadillac" and "Farmer" peaked at #1 for one week and four weeks respectively, while "Tribute" peaked at #5. Soon after, as the Hep Stars embarked on a tour to Norway, they proved to be popular, with "Cadillac" peaking at No. 1 for one week and "Farmer John" peaking at No. 4 in the Norwegian charts. Hedlund became the band's figurehead and the first true pop star in Sweden, the band itself being headline material in tabloids and various youth-oriented magazines.

Other Swedish bands such as Tages and Shanes who largely wrote their own songs made a remark on Hep Stars using cover versions. This motivated Andersson to try to write songs for the band. Also, it was a hard job to try to find fresh songs for the band's repertoire. The first song he introduced to the band was "No Response" which reached #3 in the charts. The band was at the height of popularity, especially among rock audiences, during 1965–1966 with both cover and original songs. In 1966, they performed 150 gigs in Sweden alone. The popularity grew rapidly and the band was highly successful also in Norway and Finland making several tours in both countries.

== Mainstream success, break up ==
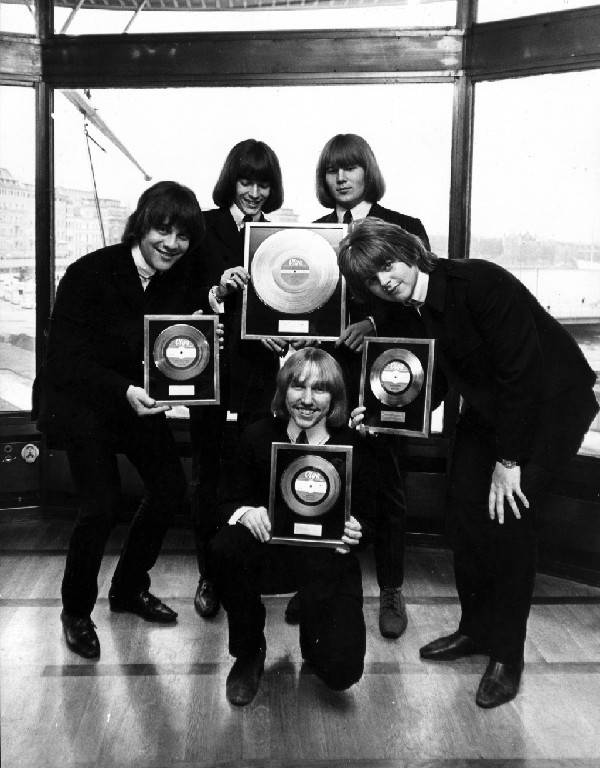
Hep Stars, 1967. Left to right, Pettersson, Hedlund, Andersson, Frisk, front Hegland

"I Natt Jag Drömde" a Swedish version of "Last Night I Had A Strangest Dream" was a massive hit in Sweden but, being a folk-song, divided the band to a degree. It also caused confusion among rock-oriented fans. The band continued playing up to 200 gigs in 1967. However, problems arose when the backup organisation made a less than adequate job with the tax authorities and in the general running of the business. At the same time, the general economic situation in the country started to stagnate towards the end of the 1960s.

Together, they forced the band to navigate towards a wider audience and the showband scene. The American singer Charlotte Walker joined in 1968.

This move was met with resistance especially from Frisk, who was eventually asked to leave early in 1969 due to diminishing interest. Björn Ulvaeus from the Hootenanny Singers stepped in. The original member leaving the band led to mixed feelings, and the decision was made to call it a day after fulfilling the tour contracts. The band played its last gig in August 1969 after which Andersson, Ulvaeus, Walker and Hedlund left the band. It went through several line-up changes before finally breaking up in the early 1970s with Hegland the only original member.

== Afterwards ==
Andersson and Ulvaeus continued with Hedlund and Walker making a show-tour with the comedian Finn Alberth. After that, Hedlund and Walker formed the duo Svenne & Lotta, who recorded the Swedish original of the ABBA song "Bang A Boomerang". They established themselves and enjoyed considerable success especially in Denmark and in mid-Europe.

Having established their partnership in Hep Stars, Andersson and Ulvaeus continued both as a songwriting team for Polar Music as well as the duo Björn & Benny, which eventually led to ABBA.

After a break Frisk, Hegland and Pettersson formed Gummibandet and released three albums in the 1970s. In the 1980s, a wave of 1960s nostalgia swept Sweden and the members had a discussion about re-forming the Hep Stars. They made some successful tours with Benneth Fagerlund replacing Andersson on keyboards. In 1990, Hegland stepped down, with Fagerlund following suit a few years later.

For the 40th anniversary collection, Cadillac Madness (40 years 40 hits 1964–2004), they re-recorded some of their hits as well as some new songs. Jan Frisk, Charlotte Walker and Sven Hedlund occasionally play concerts together with guest musicians under the Hep Stars flag.

== Notes on songwriting ==
All songs written by Benny Andersson, except where indicated:

1. "No Response"
2. "Sunny Girl"
3. "Consolation"
4. "Sound of Eve"
5. "Isn't It Easy To Say (Benny Andersson & Björn Ulvaeus)
6. "Lady Lady
7. "Wedding (Benny Andersson & Svenne Hedlund)
8. "She Will Love You" (Benny Andersson & Svenne Hedlund)
9. "Like You Used to Do" (Benny Andersson & Svenne Hedlund)
10. "It's Nice To Be Back"
11. "Sagan om lilla Sofi" (Benny Andersson & Lars Berghagen)
12. "Flower in My Garden" (Benny Andersson & Björn Ulvaeus)
13. "Suddenly Tomorrow is Today" (Benny Andersson & Lars Berghagen)
14. "Songs We Sang" (Benny Andersson & Lars Berghagen)
15. "It's Been a Long Long Time" (Lars Berghagen & Benny Andersson)
16. "Speleman" (Benny Andersson & Björn Ulvaeus & Cornelis Vreeswijk)
17. "Precis som alla andra" (Benny Andersson & Björn Ulvaeus)

The album The Hep Stars (1966) is probably the most ABBA-related of the pre-ABBA period. It includes several songs written by Andersson and "Isn't It Easy To Say", the first joint composition by him and his new friend Ulvaeus, then a member of the acoustic group Hootenanny Singers, who mainly sang in the Swedish language. On the same album there was another song, "No Time", written by Ulvaeus alone. "No Time" was also recorded by the Hootenanny Singers in an acoustic version. Andersson and Ulvaeus also wrote two songs for the album Hep Stars På Svenska – "Speleman" and "Precis Som Alla Andra" – and "Flower in My Garden", which appeared on the album Songs We Sang 68.

Among the hits were "I natt jag drömde" (a Swedish version of "Last Night I Had the Strangest Dream"), Mike Berry's "A Tribute to Buddy Holly" (#4, Sweden), "Malaika" (with lyrics in Swahili), "Wedding", "Consolation", "Cadillac" (#1, Sweden), "Farmer John" (#2, Sweden), "No Response" and "Sunny Girl". The group's last hit in 1969 was a cover of "Speedy Gonzales".

== Members ==
Partial list based on information included in this Wikipedia page, the Hep Stars' official website, and Bruce Eder's biography of the band for AllMusic.

- Christer "Chrille" Pettersson – drums (1963–1964, 1964–1971?, 1977–1978, 1989–present; died 2006)
- Lennart "Lelle" Hegland – bass (1963–1971, 1977–1978, 1989–1990, 2004?; died 2022)
- Hans Östlund – organ (1963–1964)
- Jan "Janne" Frisk – vocals, lead and rhythm guitars (1963–1969, 1977–1978, 1989–present)
- Sven Ove "Svenne" Hedlund – lead vocals (1963–1969, 1989–2022?; died 2022)
- Benny Andersson – vocals, keyboards, organ, electric harpsichord (1964–1969)
- Charlotte "Lotta" Walker-Hedlund – vocals (1968–1969, 2004?–present)
- Björn Ulvaeus – vocals, rhythm guitar (1969)
- Benneth Fagerlund – keyboards (1989–mid 1990s)
- Kookie Tian
- Josephine Tian
- Jan-Olof Enbom
- Bengt Arenblad
- Totte Päivärinta

== Discography ==
=== Studio albums ===
Title	Album details	Peak chart positions	
Title	Album details	NOR	SWE
We and Our Cadillac	Released: September 1965; Label: Olga Records	9	—
The Hep Stars	Released: 19 December 1966; Label: Olga	5	12
Jul med Hep Stars	Released: December 1967; Label: Olga	—	—
It's Been a Long Long Time	Released: February 1968; Label: Cupol Records	—	—
Songs We Sang '68	Released: December 1968; Label: Olga	—	—
Again	Released: 1970; Label: Strike Records	—	—
California Maiden	Released: 1 December 1971; Label: Philips Records	—	—
...Ur Spindelväv Och Damm	As Gummibandet; Released: 1977; Label: Columbia Records	—	—
Hep Stars Music Shop	As Gummibandet; Released: 1978; Label: Columbia	—	—
Act II	Released: 1989; Label: Eagle Records	—	—

=== Live albums ===
Title	Album details	Peak chart positions	
Title	Album details	NOR	SWE
Hep Stars on Stage	Released: November 1965; Label: Olga Records	20	—
Songs We Sang '68	Released: December 1968; Label: Olga	—	—

Compilations

Year	Album	Chart peak (SWE)
1967	Oh! The Hep Stars	–
1969	På Svenska	–
1970	How It All started	–
1970	Hep Stars Bästa	–
1974	Hep Stars Bästa Del 1	–
1975	Golden Hits	–
1978	Bästa 2	–
1982	Hep Stars, 1964–69!	–
1995	Jukebox Hits	–
1995	Bästa	–
2001	Jul Med Hep Stars	–
2001	The Collection	–
2002	Klassiker	–
2004	Cadillac Madness (40 Years – 40 Hits – 1964–2004)	9
2012	Original Album Serien	40
2014	50th Anniversary (1964–2014)	45
2015	Like We Used To: The Anthology 1965–67	–

=== Singles (1964–1969) ===
Year	Song		Chart positions						Album
Year	Song	Single details	SWE Kvällstoppen	SWE Tio i Topp	SWE Svensktoppen	NOR	FIN	NED	Album
1964	"Kana Kapila"	Catalogue number: SO 03	—	26	—	—	—	—	Non-album single
1965	"A Tribute to Buddy Holly"	Catalogue number: SO 04	5	4	—	—	28	—	Non-album single
1965	"Summertime Blues"	Catalogue number: SO 05	—	—	—	—	—	—	Non-album single
1965	"Farmer John"	Catalogue number: SO 06	1	1	—	4	—	—	Non-album single
1965	"Donna"	Catalogue number: SO 06	14	—	—	—	—	—	Non-album single
1965	"Cadillac"	Catalogue number: SO 09	1	1	—	1	—	—	We And Our Cadillac
1965	"Bald Headed Woman"	Catalogue number: SO 11	1	1	—	8	15	—	We And Our Cadillac
1965	"Rented Tuxedo"	Catalogue number: SO 12	—	—	—	—	—	—	We And Our Cadillac
1965	"No Response"	Catalogue number: SO 12	2	3	—	6	35	—	We And Our Cadillac
1965	"So Mystifying"	Catalogue number: SO 13	5	4	—	—	—	—	Non-album single
1965	"Should I"	Catalogue number: SO 17	2	3	—	—	—	—	Non-album single
1966	"Hawaii"	Catalogue number: SO 21	7	—	—	—	—	—	Non-album single
1966	"Sunny Girl"	Catalogue number: SO 21	1	1	—	4	10	4	Non-album single
1966	"Wedding"	Catalogue number: SO 25	1	1	—	8	13	—	The Hep Stars
1966	"I Natt Jag Drömde"	Catalogue number: SO 29	2	—	1	4	12	—	Non-album single
1966	"Consolation"	Catalogue number: SO 33	1	2	—	—	7	—	The Hep Stars
1966	"Don't"	Catalogue number: SO 33	1	—	—	—	—	—	The Hep Stars
1967	"Malaika"	Catalogue number: SO 38	1	6	—	—	24	—	Non-album single
1967	"It's Nice To Be Back"	Catalogue number: SO 38	—	—	—	—	—	—	Non-album single
1967	"Christmas On My Mind"	Catalogue number: SO 47	—	—	—	—	—	—	Jul med Hep Stars
1967	"Mot Okänt Land"	Catalogue number: SO 49	1	—	1	—	13	—	Non-album single
1967	"She Will Love You"	Catalogue number: SO 50	7	—	—	—	—	—	Non-album single
1967	"Lady Lady" (Note: Released in Belgium only)	Catalogue number: SO 03	—	—	—	—	—	—	
1968	"It's Been A Long Long Time"	Catalogue number: CS 45/226	14	—	—	—	—	—	It's Been A Long Long Time
1968	"Sagan Om Lilla Sofie"	Catalogue number: CS 45/232	4	—	4	—	26	—	Non-album single
1968	"Det Finns En Stad"	Catalogue number: CS 45/232	19	—	7	—	—	—	Non-album single
1968	"Let It Be Me"	Catalogue number: SO 64	4	—	—	—	16	—	Songs We Sang '68
1968	"The Music Box" (Note: Released only in The Netherlands.)	Catalogue number: SOH 24	—	—	—	—	—	20	Non-album single
1968	"Tända På Varann"	Catalogue number: SO 72	13	—	7	—	—	—	Non-album single
1968	"Komm Little Thom" (Note: Released in Germany only)	Catalogue number: SOD 05	—	—	—	—	—	—	
1968	"Holidays For Clowns"	Catalogue number: SO 80	—	—	—	—	—	—	Songs We Sang '68
	"Musty Dusty" (Note: Released as a single in the USA only. Also released in Sweden as a B-side to "It's Been A Long Long Time")	Catalogue number: SO 03	—	—	—	—	—	—	
1969	"Speleman"	Catalogue number: SO 87	10	—	4	—	—	—	Non-album single
1969	"Save Your Heart For Me" (Note: Released in the Netherlands only.)	Catalogue number: SOH 32	—	—	—	—	—	—	Non-album single
1969	"Speedy Gonzales"	Catalogue number: SO 91	2	2	—	—	—	—	Non-album single
1969	"Är Det Inte Kärlek, Säg"	Catalogue number: SO 91	4	—	3	—	—	—	Non-album single
1969	"Little Band of Gold"	Final release on the Olga label.; Catalogue number: SO 93	—	—	—	—	—	—	
1969	"Tallahassee Lassie"	First release on the Strike label.; Catalogue number: STRIKE 77	—	—	—	—	—	—	
1970	"Boy"	Catalogue number: STRIKE 78	—	—	—	—	—	—	
1970	"Blue Suede Shoes"	Catalogue number: STRIKE 80	—	—	—	—	—	—	Again
1970	"Mademoiselle Ninette"	Catalogue number: STRIKE 83	—	—	—	—	—	—	Again
1970	"You Came, You Saw, You Conquered"	Catalogue number: STRIKE 85	—	—	—	—	—	—	Non-album single
1972	"Carolina"	Released on the Philips label.; Catalogue number: 6015 038	—	—	—	—	—	—	California Maiden
1989	"Tears On My Pillow"	Released on Eagle Records.; Catalogue number: ES 10–45	—	—	—	—	—	—	Act II
2004	"Love Is Coming Back"	Catalogue number: CDPRO 4339	—	—	8	—	—	—	Cadillac Madness (40 Years • 40 Hits • 1964-2004)
2004	"Let It Be Me"	Catalogue number: FMP0112	—	—	—	—	—	—	El Lobo
2014	"I Wanna Be With You"	The single was titled "50th Anniversary".	—	—	—	—	—	—	50th Anniversary (1964-2014)

The book Cadillac Madness – den otroliga berättelsen om Hep Stars had a bonus CD with four unpublished songs from 1966 to 1967.

1. 1966: Someday Someone (Andersson-Hedlund) – Band version
2. 1966: Rag Doll (Bob Crewe-Bob Gaudio)
3. 1966: Someday Someone – Spinett version
4. 1967: Massa's Mess (Benny Andersson, Lennart Fernholm, Jan Frisk, Christer Pettersson)

A studio jam with the road manager Fernholm on bass guitar.
