= Algot Haquinius =

Swedish pianist and composer

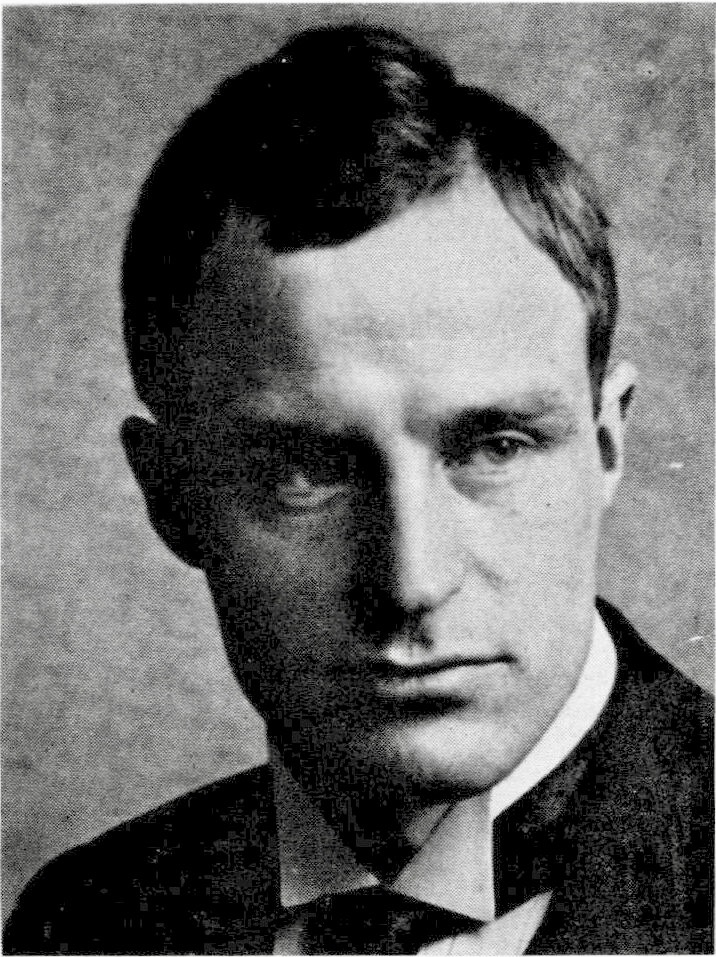
Algot Haquinius.

Johan Algot Haquinius (July 13, 1886 – February 6, 1966) was a Swedish pianist and composer of classical music.

Haquinius was born in Sveg, and studied classical piano at the Royal Music Conservatory in Stockholm from 1898 until 1906. Later, he studied for Moritz Moszkowski and Ignaz Friedman in Berlin. Among his works are string quartets, a piano concerto, solo piano music, romances and orchestral suites. His music is often described as impressionistic.

Haquinius died in Stockholm.
