= Gert Palmcrantz =

Gert Palmcrantz (born 1 February 1938) is one of the most distinguished sound engineers in Sweden. He commenced his career in the late 1950s, at the gramophone studios of Europa Film. In 1976 Palmcrantz recorded Sweden's best-selling jazz record of all time, Jazz at the Pawnshop, still in use as an audio reference around the world today. Since 1994 Palmcrantz has been pursuing new techniques in audio reproduction, using the hand-built microphones of Didrik de Geer. He has made recordings in locations as diverse as the Hermitage Museum in Saint Petersburg, Russia, and Carnegie Hall in New York.
