= Tio i Topp =

Swedish record chart and radio show

- Ticket given out by Sveriges Radio to the jury
- Other names: Sommartoppen
- Running time: 60 minutes (3:00 pm – 4:00 pm)
- Country of origin: Sweden
- Language: Swedish
- Home station: Sveriges Radio P2 (1961–1964); Sveriges Radio P3 (1964–1974)
- Hosted by: Various
- Recording studio: Various
- Original release: 14 October 1961 – 29 June 1974
- Audio format: Monaural sound
- Opening theme: "The Hully Gully Twist" by Billy Doggett's Combo (1962–1972) "Outa-Space" by Billy Preston (1972–1974) "Tequila Twist" by The Champs (Sommartoppen, 1962–1966)
- Website: Tio i Topp, Poporama & Kavalkad

Tio i Topp (English: Ten at the Top) was a Swedish record chart and radio program broadcast by Sveriges Radio P3 between the years of 1961 and 1974. It was launched to combat pirate radio charts and was the first official Swedish record chart, predating the sales chart Kvällstoppen by a year. For a few months during the summers starting in 1962, it would turn into Sommartoppen (English: The Summer Top) with a separate host and a different concept. The program ceased in June 1974 following heated debates tying in with the progg movement. Both Tio i Topp and Kvällstoppen are considered official charts in Sweden during the 1960s.

== Background ==
Starting in the late 1950s, pirate radio stations had become rampant in Sweden, starting with stations such as Radio Syd and Radio Nord in south- and northern Sweden respectively. These differed significantly from the government owned Sveriges Radio stations that were largely directed towards an older, more mature audience. The pirate radio station aimed largely towards young adults and teenagers, playing almost exclusively rock and pop music rather than having talk shows or other programming. As a result, almost three fourths of all listeners in southern Sweden were tuned into Radio Syd during its operating hours, significantly reducing traffic for Sveriges Radio and their programming.

Additionally, Sweden was as a western country relatively late with music charts, unlike neighboring Norway that had started compiling charts since 1958 through VG-lista. Sveriges Radio would not bother starting a record chart which gave pirate radio stations the opportunity to. One of the earlier was Radio Nord, who began publishing a top-twenty list of singles upon its inception in 1961. Another was called Rock-61 which published a chart featuring rock music. Both of these charts had a mail voting system, where voters would send in their picks to compile a chart. This is what largely inspired Sveriges Radio to start their own chart list which wasn't based on record sales but rather audience feedback.

== Premise ==
=== Voting ===
Unlike most contemporary record charts, Tio i Topp was largely based on feedback from audiences, mostly consisting of teenagers. The audience would make up what would be known as the jury for the show. They would consist of 400 teenagers, 200 from Stockholm and 200 from another random city in Sweden. Stockholm was made a permanent jury as it was Sweden's biggest and most important city, meaning that the audiences could be made up of more differentiating voters, and not have the same audienced shuffled over and over. The second city was almost always random, but almost exclusively featured towns with a population of at least 10000 to secure 200 to the audience every Saturday. It was also spread out in order to ensure the fact that most parts of Sweden got a say in popular music, as it could variate from Malmö one week to Kiruna the next.

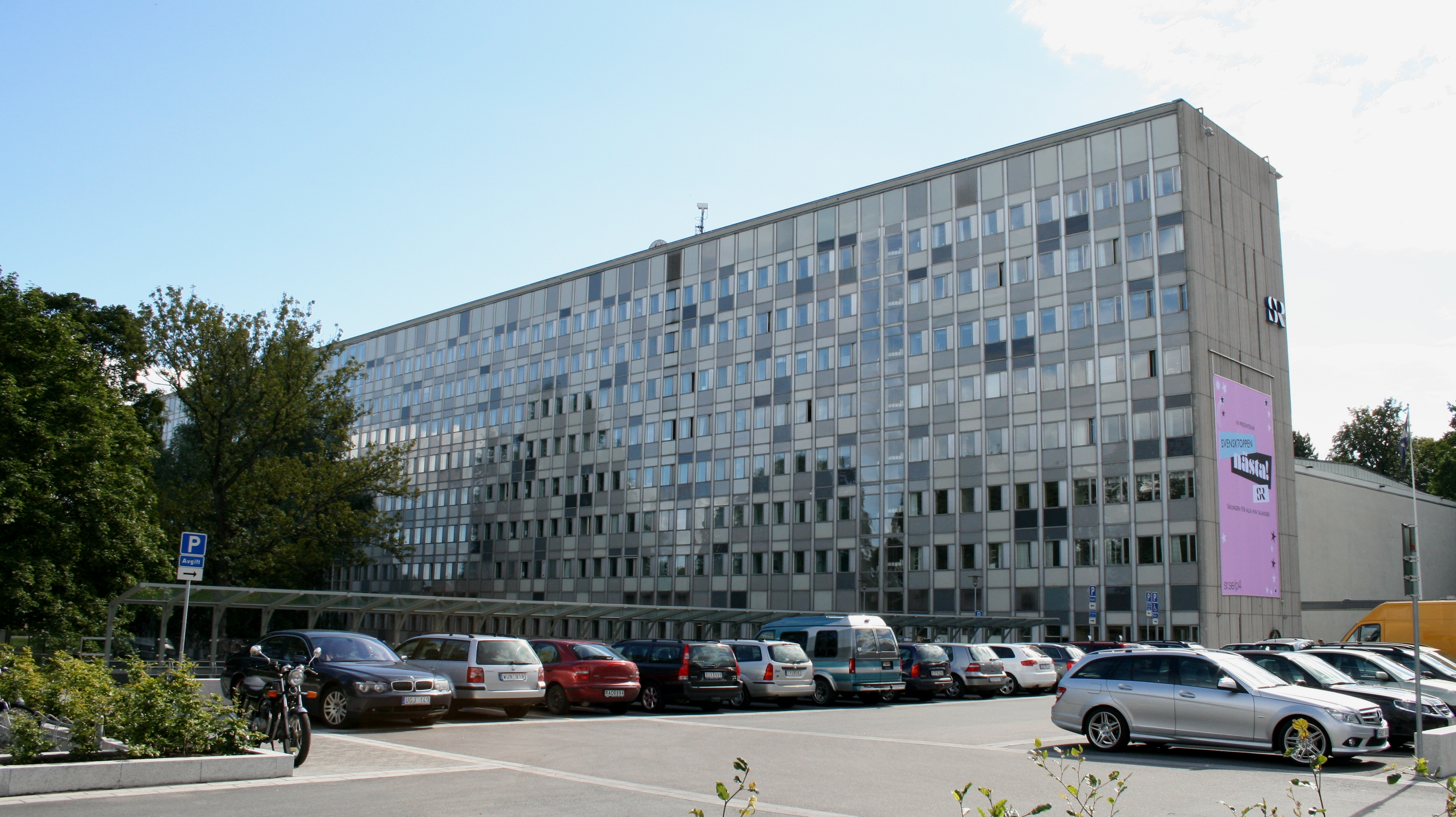
Voters at Radiohuset in Stockholm were part of a permanent jury until 1967.

The primary voting system initially consisted of audience response using mentometers, an invention which allowed voters to press a button to register a vote. One hour before the program went live, the jury listened to ten new songs. Of these, five songs were voted out which then challenged the ten who were on last week's list. The 15 songs that were left were played in the program, and the audience had to first vote through their mentometer buttons on which songs would leave the list. Towards the end, the ten remaining songs that were most popular were played and the audience now had to vote for one of them, although since there was no opportunity at all to control, there were certainly many who voted for several songs that they liked.

This system was considered flawed as it allowed for biased opinions among voters. It also gave was for something the media would dub a "röstkupp" (English: "voting coup") in which a singer or a band would perform or sign autographs in towns where the voting for Tio i Topp would occur. This largely involved the secondary, non-permanent city as they were easier to convince than Stockholm's audience. One of the earlier examples of a "röstkupp" involved the rock band the Shanes who reached number one on Tio i Topp with their single "Let Me Show You Who I Am"; they had performed in Luleå the day before, which led to 97% of all votes from that town going to the Shanes, whereas only 8% voted on them in Stockholm. The most famous instance of a "röstkupp" involved Lenne and the Lee Kings, who on 8 January 1966 went from number nine straight to number one with their single "Stop The Music", as a result of playing in the Swedish town of Malung where voting took place the following day. This is notoriously the only time the weekly chart was disqualified in the program's entire run.

To combat potential "röstkupper", Sveriges Radio introduced a third town to vote for songs, starting on 3 September 1966. Stockholm was still a permanent jury city however, which led to it being more susceptible to "röstkupper" following the third town's inclusion. When rock band Science Poption did one by giving out free concert tickets to audience members in 1967, its status as a permanent jury city was disestablished. However, many bands would still attempt to chart high by going to said cities, with some bands splitting up in order for individual members to go to each cities. When Sveriges Radio had enough they removed all three jury cities altogether in 1968, instead relying on Statistiska centralbyrån (SCB) to phone up 400 random teenagers across Sweden every week; this system was used until the end.

=== Hosts and sommartoppen ===
The show utilized several hosts, some of which would become successful in their own right as television presenters, while others remained obscure in media history. The first host on the show was Lill Lindfors who hosted it since its inception on 14 October 1961, leaving after about half a year in March 1962. With the exception of a few, the hosts for the show largely did not remain for more than a few months, with some only staying for four weeks, including Lars-Gunnar Björklund who took over from Lindfors in March 1962, staying there for only that month. If Sommartoppen is included, 1966 saw 17 hosts being featured on the show, most of them staying for only a month. The individual who stayed as the host the longest was Kaj Kindvall, who started his broadcasting career on Tio i Topp on 5 June 1970, staying until the end.

The show's theme song was initially "The Hully Gully Twist" by Bill Doggett's Combo, which was recorded the year before the show started. It is now so heavily associated with the show that it is his most famous work in Sweden. In 1972, this was replaced by Billy Preston's 1971 instrumental "Outa-Space" which it was until the end of the show. Sommartoppen used the song "Tequila Twist" by the Champs as their signature song.

During the summer of 1962–1966, Tio i Topp was replaced by Sommartoppen, where there was only a jury in one city, but there was only round of voting instead of the three-part that was in the main program. Sommartoppen was hosted by a specific host not tied to the rest of Tio i Topp, with Pekka Langer hosting it for the first three years. In 1966, a staggering 11 hosts were present during the span of only three months, which led to some confusion regarding the future of the programme as less and less hosts wanted to lead the radio shows. It was ultimately the final summer that Sommartoppen ran, but it returned once again in 1986 as a standalone programme and was eventually finally shut down in 2006.

== Milestones ==
The Beatles was the artist with the most singles at 35, 18 of which reached number one between the years of 1963 and 1970. They also scored the most point out of any band on the chart, with 1812 points from juries. The most successful American artist on the chart was Elvis Presley, who had 19 singles reach the chart. The most popular Swedish group were Ola and the Janglers and Tages, who both had 13 singles reach the chart, though The Hep Stars had the most number-one singles out of any Swedish group with five.

== See also ==
- Kvällstoppen, a contemporary sales chart also broadcast on Sveriges Radio P3
- Sveriges Radio P3, state owned radio station which broadcast Tio i Topp

== Sources ==
- Hallberg, Eric; Henningsson, Ulf (2012). Tio i Topp - med de utslagna "på försök" 1961–74 (in Swedish). Premium. ISBN 978-91-89136-89-2.
