= Åke Gerhard =

Swedish songwriter (1921–2009)

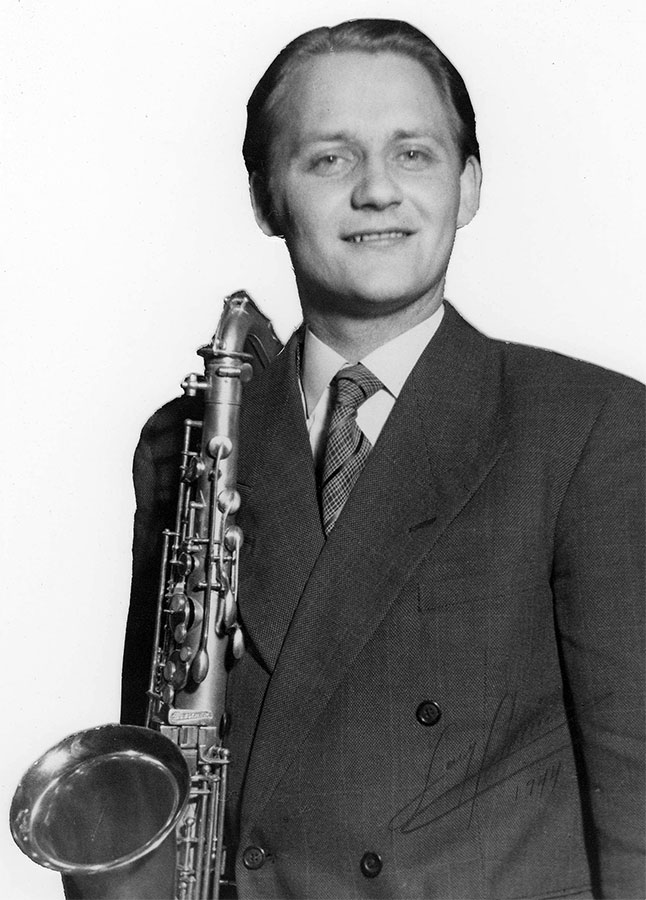
- Born: Åke Gerhard Larsson; 26 March 1921; Utansjö, Ångermanland
- Died: 20 August 2009

Åke Gerhard (Utansjö, Ångermanland, 26 March 1921 – 20 August 2009) was a Swedish songwriter. His songs won the title for the first three years of Sweden's Melodifestival: In 1958 "Lilla stjärna" Little star sung by Alice Babs, in 1959 "Augustin" sung by Siw Malmkvist with lyrics by Harry Sandin (performed by Brita Borg at Eurovision) and in 1960 "Alla andra får varann" Everyone else gets each other with lyrics by Ulf Kjellqvist.

In 1964, Gerhard founded record label Olga Records. Named after his mother, the label was distributed through another Swedish record company, Cupol. In 1964, he signed rock quintet Hep Stars to the label, a band which became Olga's biggest success, achieving eight number ones on Kvällstoppen and five on Tio i Topp between 1965 and 1967. However, after the Hep Stars success gradually started diminishing in 1968–1970, the label lost a lot of its generated income and as a result, the final release on the label was issued in 1971.
