= Svenne Hedlund =

Swedish singer (1945–2022)

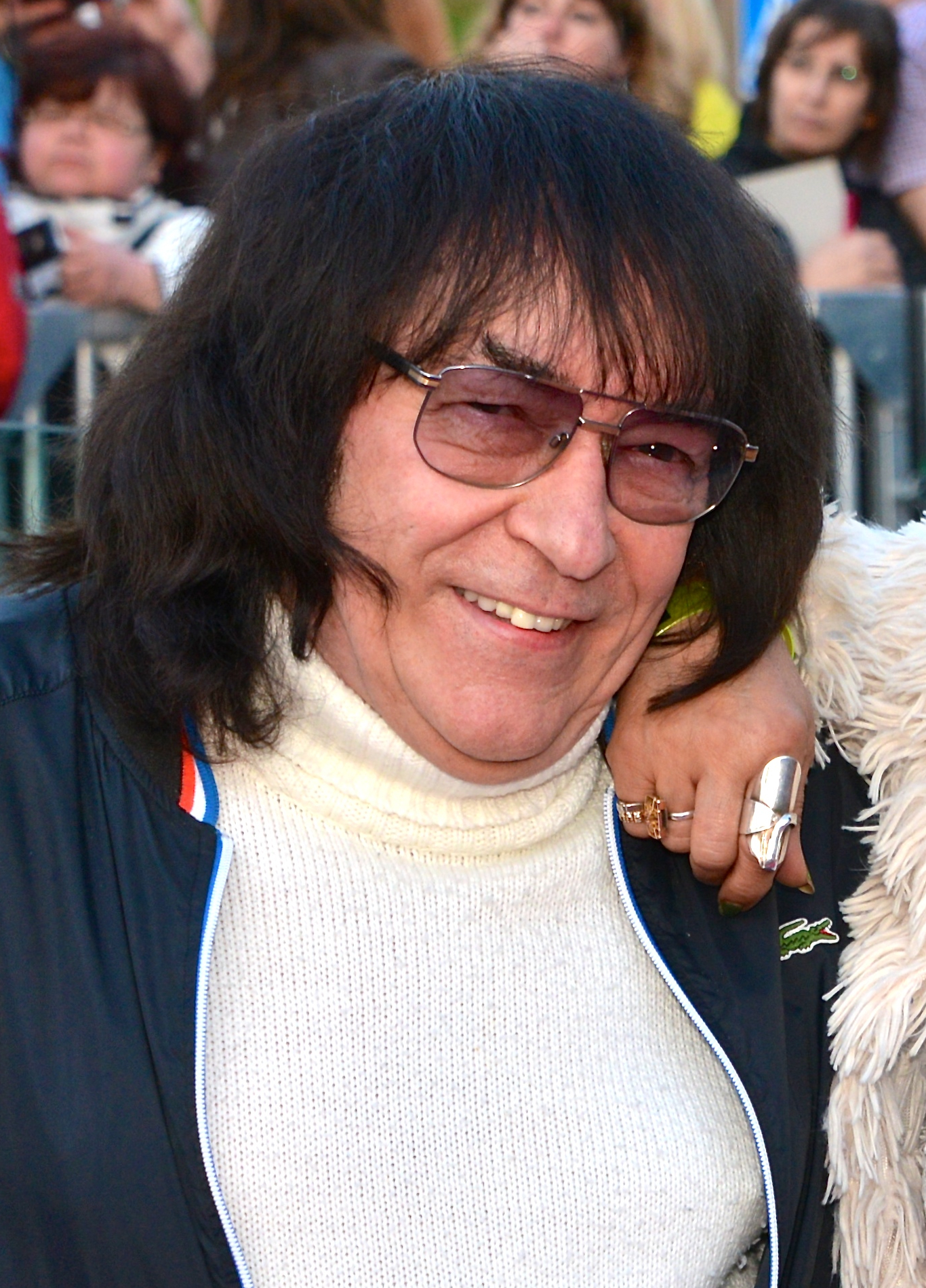
- Hedlund in 2013

Background information
- Born: 1 March 1945; Solna, Sweden
- Died: 3 December 2022 (aged 77) Värnamo, Sweden
- Genres: Pop; rock; schlager
- Occupations: Singer
- Formerly of: Hep Stars; Svenne & Lotta

Sven Ove Hedlund (1 March 1945 – 3 December 2022) was a Swedish pop singer who was a member of the music group Idolerna.

Hedlund sang in the Swedish bands Clifftones and Hep Stars in the 1960s. In 1968, the singer Charlotte Walker (born 1944) became a member of the band, and they formed the duo Svenne and Lotta (called "Sven and Charlotte" in several countries) the following year.

The couple were married from 1969 until they divorced in 2014.

Hedlund died in Värnamo on 3 December 2022, at the age of 77 from COVID-19.
