= Somewhat of an Anthology =

Compilation album by The Slickee Boys
- Released: 2002
- Recorded: 1976–1989
- Genre: Rock
- Length: 73:16
- Label: Dacoit

Somewhat of an Anthology is a limited edition Compact Disc on the Dacoit label (catalog number 120101) that compiles material from throughout the Slickee Boys' career. With the exception of one live song, every cut on the CD had previously been released, albeit many of them on vinyl records pressed in small numbers (e.g. Separated Vegetables, the band's first long-player had an initial pressing of only 100 copies). This collection showcases the songwriting talents of the band's rotating membership over the years. It also includes cover versions of songs originally recorded by the Afrika Korps, Buddy Holly, and Alice Cooper.

This album won the 2002 Rock Recording of the Year at the Wammies, the Washington Area Music Association's annual awards show.

== Track listing ==
1. "Manganese Android Puppies" – 2:01 (Kim Kane)
  - from the Hot and Cool EP, 1976
2. "Six Feet Under" – 3:30 (Marshall Keith, Martha Hull)
  - from the Separated Vegetables LP, 1977
3. "Heart On" – 3:20 (Howard Wuelfing)
  - from the Mersey, Mersey Me EP, 1978
4. "Put a Bullet thru the Jukebox" – 2:14 (Kane, Jim Testa)
  - from Mersey, Mersey Me
5. "TV Medley" (live) – 4:48 (arrangement: Keith)
  - "Perry Mason Theme" (Frederick Steiner)
  - "Twilight Zone" (Marius Constant)
  - "Alfred Hitchcock Presents" (Leonard Gordon, Dave Kahn)
  - "James Bond Theme" (Monty Norman)
  - "Mission: Impossible" (Lalo Schifrin)
  - "Theme from Exodus" (Ernest Gold)
  - previously unreleased
6. "Gotta Tell Me Why" – 4:07 (Mark Noone)
  - from the 3rd EP, 1979
7. "Forbidden Alliance" – 2:29 (Keith, Noone)
  - from 3rd EP
8. "The Brain That Refused to Die" – 3:11 (The Slickee Boys)
  - from the 7" single, 1980
9. "Disconnected" – 2:55 (Noone, J. Charney)
  - from the Connected compilation LP, 1981
10. "Here to Stay" – 4:11 (Noone)
  - from the 7" single, 1981
11. "Escalator 66" – 2:35 (Keith, Noone)
  - from the Cybernetic Dreams of Pi LP, 1983
12. "Life of the Party" – 3:25 (Noone)
  - from Cybernetic Dreams of Pi
13. "When I Go to the Beach" – 2:39 (Noone)
  - from Cybernetic Dreams of Pi
14. "Time Spent Waiting" – 3:03 (Keith, Noone)
  - from Cybernetic Dreams of Pi
15. "The Crawling Hand" – 2:43 (Keith)
  - from Cybernetic Dreams of Pi
16. "Your Autumn Eyes" – 4:54 (Kane, Keith, Noone)
  - from the 7" single
17. "Droppin' Off to Sleep" – 4:27 (Noone)
  - from the Fashionably Late LP, 1988
18. "Dream Lovers" (live) – 4:00 (John Chumbris, Dan Palenski, Noone)
  - from the Live at Last album, 1989
19. "Sleepless Night" (live) – 2:20 (Chumbris)
  - from Live at Last
20. "Jailbait Janet" (live) – 2:15 (Kenne Highland, Noone)
  - Originally recorded by the Afrika Korps, 1977
  - from Live at Last
21. "Down the Line" – 1:45 (Buddy Holly, Bob Montgomery, Norman Petty)
  - Originally recorded by Buddy Holly, 1955 (released in 1964)
  - from the Every Day Is a Holly Day tribute album, 1988
22. "This Party Sucks (Frat mix)" – 3:12 (Noone)
  - from the 7" single, 1988
23. "I'm Eighteen" – 3:14 (Alice Cooper, Michael Bruce, Glen Buxton, Dennis Dunaway, Neal Smith)
  - Originally recorded by Alice Cooper, 1971
  - from the Eighteen and Misunderstood 7" by Dan (featuring The Slickee Boys), 1988

== Personnel ==
=== The band ===
- Kim Kane – Rhythm guitar, lead guitar, back-up vocals, bracelet and strangled parrot ("The Brain That Refused to Die"), pork chop ("Disconnected"), drums ("I'm Eighteen")
- Marshall Keith – Lead guitar, rhythm guitar, back-up vocals, keyboards, Marvox ("Your Autumn Eyes"), bass guitar ("I'm Eighteen")
- Mark Noone – Lead vocals, lead guitar ("I'm Eighteen")
- Emery Olexa – Bass guitar ("The Brain That Refused to Die")
- Dan Palenski – Drums, back-up vocals, percussion, lead vocals ("I'm Eighteen")

except:

- John Chumbris — Bass guitar ("Time Spent Waiting", "Your Autumn Eyes", "Droppin' Off to Sleep"), keyboards ("Your Autumn Eyes"), back-up vocals ("Your Autumn Eyes", "Droppin' Off to Sleep"), rhythm guitar ("I'm Eighteen")
- Giles Cook — Drums ("Your Autumn Eyes", "Droppin' Off to Sleep", "Dream Lovers", "Sleepless Night", "Jailbait Janet", "On Down the Line", "This Party Sucks"), back-up vocals ("Dream Lovers", "Sleepless Night", "Jailbait Janet")
- John Hansen — Rhythm guitar ("On Down the Line")
- Martha Hull — Lead vocals ("Manganese Android Puppies", "Six Feet Under", "Heart On", "Put a Bullet thru the Jukebox")
- Mike Maxwell — Bass guitar ("Dream Lovers", "Sleepless Night", "Jailbait Janet", "On Down the Line", "This Party Sucks"), back-up vocals ("Dream Lovers", "Sleepless Night", "Jailbait Janet")
- Chris Rounds — Drums, back-up vocals ("Manganese Android Puppies", "Six Feet Under")
- Andy von Brand — Bass guitar ("Manganese Android Puppies", "Six Feet Under")
- Howard Wuelfing — Bass guitar, back-up vocals ("Heart On", "Put a Bullet thru the Jukebox")

=== Production ===
- Steve Carr — Engineer ("Droppin' Off to Sleep", "On Down the Line", "This Party Sucks"), remix engineer ("Dream Lovers", "Sleepless Night", "Jailbait Janet"), mixing ("On Down the Line")
- John Chumbris — Producer ("Escalator 66", "Life of the Party", "When I Go to the Beach", "Time Spent Waiting", "The Crawling Hand", "I'm Eighteen"), engineer ("Your Autumn Eyes"), mixing ("Droppin' Off to Sleep", "Your Autumn Eyes")
- Giles Cook — Mixing ("This Party Sucks")
- Peter D'Antonio — Engineer ("Manganese Android Puppies")
- Mark Greenhouse — Engineer ("Gotta Tell Me Why", "Forbidden Alliance", "The Brain That Refused to Die", "Disconnected", "Here to Stay")
- Skip Groff — Executive producer ("Gotta Tell Me Why", "Forbidden Alliance")
- John Hansen — Live sound engineer ("Dream Lovers", "Sleepless Night", "Jailbait Janet")
- Steven Lorber — Producer ("Manganese Android Puppies", "Six Feet Under")
- Chris Mix — Sound engineer ("Dream Lovers", "Sleepless Night", "Jailbait Janet")
- Ted Nicely — Producer ("Gotta Tell Me Why", "Forbidden Alliance", "The Brain That Refused to Die", "Disconnected", "Here to Stay")
- Alain "Hot Bread" Painchaud — Engineer ("Dream Lovers", "Sleepless Night", "Jailbait Janet")
- Jerry Ressler — Engineer ("Manganese Android Puppies")
- The Slickee Boys — Producer ("Escalator 66", "Life of the Party", "When I Go to the Beach", "Time Spent Waiting", "The Crawling Hand", "Droppin'", "Your Autumn Eyes", "On Down the Line", "This Party Sucks")
- Don Zientara — Engineer ("Escalator 66", "Life of the Party", "When I Go to the Beach", "Time Spent Waiting", "The Crawling Hand")

== Studio information ==
- Recorded at Underground Sound, Largo, Maryland, June 1976 ("Manganese Android Puppies")
- Recorded at Underground Sound, January 1977 ("Six Feet Under")
- Recorded at Zientara 'B' Studio, March—April 1978 ("Heart On", "Put a Bullet thru the Jukebox")
- Recorded at Zientara 'B' Studio, June 23, 1979 ("Gotta Tell Me Why", "Forbidden Alliance")
- Recorded at Track Studios, Silver Spring, Maryland, April 1980 ("The Brain That Refused to Die")
- Recorded at Track Studios, 1980 ("Disconnected")
- Recorded at Track Studios, ("Here to Stay")
- Recorded at Inner Ear Studio, Arlington, Virginia ("Escalator 66", "Life of the Party", "When I Go to the Beach", "Time Spent Waiting", "The Crawling Hand", "I'm Eighteen")
- Recorded at Inner Ear Studios, and Hit + Run Studios, Rockville, Maryland ("Droppin' Off to Sleep", "Your Autumn Eyes")
- Recorded live at Ubu, Rennes, France, May 21, 1988 ("Dream Lovers", "Sleepless Night", "Jailbait Janet")
- Remixed at Hit + Run Studios ("Dream Lovers", "Sleepless Night", "Jailbait Janet")
- Recorded at Hit + Run Studios ("On Down the Line", "This Party Sucks")
- Mastered at Hit and Run Recording

== Additional credits ==
- Steve Carr – Graphics
- Buzz McClain — Liner notes
- Dan Palenski – Song notes
- Tom Shea – Cover photo
- Rob White – Photography
- Paul Lyons – Photography
- Mei Mei Gillespie – Photography
- Cathy Gatling – Photography

== Errata ==
- The song "Manganese Android Puppies" is listed as "Manganese Android Hushpuppies".
- Mei Mei Gillespie's name is misspelled "Gilespe".

== Sources ==
- CD liner notes
- Hot and Cool liner notes
- Separated Vegetables liner notes
- Mersey, Mersey Me liner notes
- 3rd EP liner notes
- "The Brain That Refused to Die" liner notes
- Connected liner notes
- "Here to Stay" liner notes
- Cybernetic Dreams of Pi liner notes
- "Your Autumn Eyes" liner notes
- Fashionably Late liner notes
- Live at Last liner notes
- "This Party Sucks" liner notes
- Every Day Is a Holly Day liner notes
- Eighteen and Misunderstood liner notes
- ASCAP Ace
- BMI Repertoire
- Buddy Holly: The Complete Works
