= Here to Stay (The Slickee Boys album) =

Compilation album by The Slickee Boys
- Released: 1982
- Recorded: 1976–1981
- Genre: Rock
- Label: Line

Professional ratings
Review scores
Source	Rating
Allmusic	link
Flex!	(Favorable) link
Trouser Press	(Favorable) link

Here to Stay compiles all five Slickee Boys 7"s from 1976–1981 (plus one previously unreleased song—"Kids"). It was released by the German label Line Records with a catalog number of LLP 5170. It includes cover versions of songs originally recorded by Perry Como (by way of the Downliners Sect), the Rokes (and the Grass Roots—the Slickees combined the two versions), Vince Taylor, the Yardbirds, the Hangmen, The Chocolate Watch Band, as well as the theme from the film Exodus. According to the liner notes for Mersey, Mersey Me, Talking Heads had dropped the song "Girls Want to Be With the Girls" from their repertoire but re-visited it after hearing the Slickees' version, which beat the Talking Heads version to vinyl by months.

Some of these songs were later re-recorded for their 1985 album, Uh Oh… No Breaks! (including "Kids", re-titled "When We Were Kids").

== Track listing ==
1. "Glendora" – 2:42 (Ray Stanley)
  - Originally recorded by Perry Como, 1956; also recorded by the Downliners Sect, 1966
2. "Golden Love" – 3:47 (Kim Kane)
3. "Forbidden Alliance" – 2:30 (Mark Noone, Marshall Keith)
4. "Put a Bullet Thru the Jukebox" – 2:15 (Kane, Jim Testa)
5. "Let's Live for Today" – 2:45 (Giulio Rapetti, Norman David Shapiro, Michael Julien)
  - Originally recorded by the Rokes (as "Piangi Con Me"), 1966; also recorded by the Grass Roots, 1967
6. "Girls Want to Be With the Girls" – 2:37 (David Byrne)
  - Originally recorded by Talking Heads, 1978
7. "Heart On" – 3:23 (Howard Wuelfing)
8. "Here to Stay" – 4:15 (Noone)
9. "Porcelain Butter Kitten" – 2:35 (Kane)
10. "Brand New Cadillac" – 2:03 (Vince Taylor)
  - Originally recorded by Vince Taylor and His Playboys, 1959
11. "Psycho Daisies" – 2:09 (Jeff Beck, Chris Dreja, Jim McCarty, Jimmy Page, Keith Relf)
  - Originally recorded by the Yardbirds, 1966
12. "Manganese Android Puppies" – 2:10 (Kane)
13. "What a Boy Can't Do" – 2:32 (Tom Guernsey)
  - Originally recorded by the Hangmen (as "What a Girl Can't Do"), 1966
14. "Theme from Exodus" – 1:53 (Ernest Gold; arrangement: Keith)
  - Originally in the film Exodus, 1960
15. "Gotta Tell Me Why" – 4:09 (Noone)
16. "The Brain That Refused to Die" – 3:15 (Kane, Emery Olexa, Noone, Dan Palenski, Keith)
17. "(Are You Gonna Be There at The) Love-In" – 6:15 (Ethon McElroy, Donald Bennett)
  - Originally recorded by The Chocolate Watch Band, 1967
18. "Kids" – 3:13 (Kane, Olexa, Noone, Palenski, Keith)

== Personnel ==
=== The band ===
- Kim Kane — Rhythm and lead guitar, vocals, Wanktone lead, bracelet, strangled parrot
- Emery Olexa — Bass
- Mark Noone — Lead vocals, tambourine
- Dan Palenski — Drums, maracas, conga, back-up vocals
- Marshall Keith — Lead and rhythm guitar, Farfisa organ, back-up vocals

except:

- Martha Hull — Lead vocals ("Brand New Cadillac", "Psycho Daisies", "Manganese Android Puppies", "What a Boy Can't Do", "Put a Bullet thru the Jukebox", "Let's Live for Today", "Girls Want to Be With the Girls", "Heart On")
- Andy von Brand — Bass ("Brand New Cadillac", "Manganese Android Puppies", "What a Boy Can't Do", "Theme from 'Exodus'")
- Chris Rounds — Drums ("Brand New Cadillac", "Psycho Daisies", "Manganese Android Puppies", "What a Boy Can't Do", "Theme from 'Exodus'")
- Thomas Kane — Bass ("Psycho Daisies")
- Howard Wuelfing — Bass, vocals ("Put a Bullet thru the Jukebox", "Let's Live for Today", "Girls Want to Be With the Girls", "Heart On")

=== Guest musicians ===
- Andy Charneco — Kalimba
- Don Zientara — Back-up vocals ("Let's Live for Today")

=== Production ===
- Taka Chance — Producer ("(Are You Gonna Be There at The) Love-In")
- Peter D'Antonio — Engineer ("Brand New Cadillac", "Psycho Daisies", "Manganese Android Puppies", "What a Boy Can't Do", "Theme from 'Exodus'")
- Mark Greenhouse — Engineer ("The Brain That Refused to Die", "Here to Stay", "Porcelain Butter Kitten")
- Skip Groff — Producer ("Gotta Tell Me Why", "Forbidden Alliance", "Golden Love", "Glendora")
- Steven Lorber — Producer ("Brand New Cadillac", "Psycho Daisies", "Manganese Android Puppies", "What a Boy Can't Do", "Theme from 'Exodus'")
- Ted Nicely — Assistant Producer ("Gotta Tell Me Why", "Forbidden Alliance", "Golden Love", "Glendora", Producer "The Brain That Refused to Die", "Here to Stay", "Porcelain Butter Kitten")
- Jerry Ressler — Engineer ("Brand New Cadillac", "Psycho Daisies", "Manganese Android Puppies", "What a Boy Can't Do", "Theme from 'Exodus'")

== Additional credits ==
- Recorded at Underground Sound, Largo, Maryland, June 1976 ("Brand New Cadillac", "Psycho Daisies", "Manganese Android Puppies", "What a Boy Can't Do", "Theme from 'Exodus'")
- Recorded at Zientara 'B' Studio, March—April 1978 ("Put a Bullet thru the Jukebox", "Let's Live for Today", "Girls Want to Be With the Girls", "Heart On")
- Recorded at Zientara 'B' Studio, June 23, 1979 ("Gotta Tell Me Why", "Forbidden Alliance", "Golden Love", "Glendora")
- Recorded live at the Psychedelly, Bethesda, Maryland, February 16, 1980 ("(Are You Gonna Be There at The) Love-In")
- Recorded at Track Studios, Silver Spring, Maryland, April 1980 ("The Brain That Refused to Die")
- Recorded at Track Studios ("Here to Stay", "Porcelain Butter Kitten")
- Kim Kane — cover art
- David Bracken — cover art

== Errata ==
- The song "Forbidden Alliance" is incorrectly listed as "Forbidden Love"

== Alternate versions ==
- Line released a white vinyl LP in 1987 (LILP 4.00081) and a CD in 1988 (LICD 9.00081).

== Sources ==
- LP and CD liner notes
- Hot and Cool EP liner notes
- Mersey, Mersey Me EP liner notes
- 3rd EP liner notes
- "The Brain That Refused to Die" 7" single liner notes
- "Here to Stay" 7" single liner notes
- ASCAP database
- BMI Repertoire
- Library of Congress Catalog Record: LCCN 93-702155
