= A Postcard from the Day =

Live album by The Slickee Boys
- Released: 2006
- Recorded: 1980–1982
- Genre: Rock
- Length: 70:59
- Label: Dacoit

Professional ratings
Review scores
Source	Rating
Black to Comm	favorable link

A Postcard from the Day is the second live album (and most recent release) by the American band The Slickee Boys (Dacoit Records, catalog #2006-1). The album, compiled by guitarist Marshall Keith, collects recordings from 1980 to 1982, taken from shows in Maryland, Virginia, D.C., and New York City.

== Track listing ==
1. "Life of the Party" – 3:48 (Mark Noone)
2. "Cinderella" – 2:23 (Gerry Roslie)
  - Originally recorded by The Sonics,
3. "Porcelain Butter Kitten" – 2:41 (Kim Kane)
4. "Can't Believe" – 3:46 (Marshall Keith, Noone)
5. "Disconnected" – 2:45 (Noone, J. Charney)
6. "Goin' All the Way/Glendora" – 4:09 (Mike Bouyea/Ray Stanley)
  - "Goin' All the Way" originally recorded by The Squires, 1966
  - "Glendora" originally recorded by Perry Como, 1956; also recorded by the Downliners Sect, 1966
7. "Jailbait Janet" – 2:15 (Kenne Highland)
  - Originally recorded by The Afrika Korps, 1977
8. "Henry VIII" – 1:52 (Fred Murray, Robert Weston)
  - Popular recording by Herman's Hermits, 1965
9. "Hiccupped to Hell" – 2:13 (Ersel Wank)
  - Originally by the Wanktones
10. "Ain't Gettin' Any" – 3:27 (Robert Hudson, John Ford)
  - Originally recorded by The Monks
11. "Louise/Control" – 4:27 (Jesse Lee Kincaid/Howard Weulfing)
  - "Louise" originally recorded by Paul Revere and the Raiders, 1966
12. "Stepping Stone" – 3:39 (Tommy Boyce, Bobby Hart)
  - Originally recorded by Paul Revere and the Raiders, 1966; also recorded by The Monkees, 1966
13. "Mean Screen" – 2:16 (Scott Duhamel, Eddie Flowers, Highland)
  - Originally recorded by The Gizmos, 1976
14. "Somebody's Gonna Get Their Head Kicked in Tonite" – 1:40 (Jeremy Spencer)
  - Originally recorded by Fleetwood Mac (as Earl Vince and The Valiants), 1969; also recorded by The Rezillos, 1978
15. "Pictures of Matchstick Men" – 2:38 (Francis Rossi)
  - Originally recorded by the Status Quo, 1968
16. "A Question of Temperature" – 3:29 (Mike Appel, Ed Schnug, Don Henny)
  - Originally recorded by The Balloon Farm, 1967
17. "Riddles and Fairytales" – 2:17 (Tony Camp, Brian Cooke)
  - Originally recorded by Bohemian Vendetta, 1968
18. "Reverse Psychiatry" – 3:34 (Keith, Noone, Emery Olexa)
19. "The Crawling Hand" – 2:45 (Keith)
20. "Nagasaki Neuter" – 3:11 (Kane, Keith)
21. "Weasel" (WHFS commercial) – :26
22. "When We Were Kids" – 2:54 (Noone)
23. "Gotta Tell Me Why" – 4:35 (Noone)
24. "Here to Stay" – 3:49 (Noone)

== Personnel ==
=== The band ===
- Kim Kane – Rhythm guitar
- Marshall Keith – Lead guitar
- Mark Noone – Lead vocals
- Dan Palenski – Drums

=== Additional musicians ===
- John Hansen – Lead vocals ("Stepping Stone")

=== Production ===
- Seth Martin – Soundman
- John Chumbris – Soundman

== Additional credits ==
- John Hansen – Stage dude
- Tom Shea – Stage dude, cover photo, collage of photos
- Marshall Keith – CD design
- Cathy Gatlin – Collage of photos
- Carol Albert – Slickette
- Kathleen Sheedy – Slickette
- "Thanks for setting the spark on this project: Jim Moon; for cassettes: Robbie White, Tom Shea, Kay Pauley; for carting us all over the East Coast: Tom Shea, Allen Atkinson; for paving the way: Razz; for keeping us going all those years: our great fans"
- Recorded at:
  - The Psychedelly, Bethesda, Maryland ("Goin' All the Way/Glendora", "Stepping Stone", "Mean Screen", "Reverse Psychiatry", "When We Were Kids")
  - The Elbow Room, Harrisonburg, Virginia ("Disconnected", "Riddles and Fairytales", "Gotta Tell Me Why", "Here to Stay")
  - Desperados, Georgetown, Washington, D.C. ("Life of the Party", "The Crawling Hand")
  - The Cellar Door, Georgetown ("Cinderella", "Porcelain Butter Kitten", "Can't Believe", "Hiccupped to Hell", "Ain't Gettin' Any", "Louise/Control")
  - The Bayou, Georgetown ("Somebody's Gonna Get Their Head Kicked in Tonite", "Pictures of Matchstick Men", "A Question of Temperature")
  - Columbia Station, Adams Morgan, Washington, D.C. ("Nagasaki Neuter")
  - CBGB, New York City ("Jailbait Janet", "Henry VIII")
