= Uh Oh... No Breaks! =

Uh Oh… No Breaks!

Studio album by The Slickee Boys
- Released: March 19, 1985
- Genre: Rock
- Length: 37:45
- Label: Twin/Tone
- Producer: The Slickee Boys

The Slickee Boys chronology
Cybernetic Dreams of Pi (1983)	Uh Oh… No Breaks! (1985)	Fashionably Late (1988)

Professional ratings
Review scores
Source	Rating
Trouser Press	(Favorable)

Washington, D.C.'s Slickee Boys' third "proper" album (not including compilations or live releases), Uh Oh… No Breaks! was released on LP and cassette in March 1985 by Twin/Tone (a Minneapolis label best known for having released The Replacements' early records) with the catalog number TTR 8544. Almost half of the album is re-recorded versions of songs they had previously released. There are cover version of songs originally by the French band the Dogs, 1960s garage band the Squires, Perry Como (by way of the Downliners Sect), and D.C. all-star punkers the Afrika Korps (a band which included a few Slickee Boys).

== Track listing ==
1. "Dream Lovers" – 3:48 (John Chumbris, Dan Palenski, Mark Noone)
2. "Death Lane" – 1:58 (Dominique Laboubée)
  - Originally recorded by the Dogs, 1982
3. "Teenage Romance" – 3:05 (Marshall Keith, Martha Hull, Palenski)
4. "Disconnected" – 2:46 (Noone, J. Charney)
5. "Gotta Tell Me Why" – 3:58 (Noone)
6. "The Brain That Refused to Die" – 3:21 (The Slickee Boys)
7. "Bad Dream" – 2:50 (Noone)
8. "Can't Believe" – 3:43 (Keith, Noone)
9. "Going All the Way" – 2:06 (Mike Bouyea)
  - Originally recorded by the Squires, 1966
10. "Glendora" – 2:01 (Ray Stanley)
  - Originally recorded by Perry Como, 1956, also recorded by the Downliners Sect, 1966
11. "Danger Drive" – 2:24 (Noone)
12. "Jailbait Janet" – 2:13 (Kenne Highland, Noone)
  - Originally recorded by the Afrika Korps, 1977
13. "When We Were Kids" – 3:32 (Noone)

== Personnel ==
=== The band ===
- Kim Kane – Rhythm guitar, backing vocals
- Marshall Keith – Lead guitar, keyboards, backing vocals
- Dan Palenski – drums, percussion, backing vocals
- Mark Noone – Lead vocals, guitar
- John Chumbris – Bass guitar, keyboards, backing vocals, guitar

=== Production ===
- Recorded by Paul Stark
- Steve Fjelstad – Re-mixes of "Death Lane" and "Teenage Romance"
- Howie Weinberg — Mastering (at Masterdisk)

== Additional credits ==
- Recorded at Nicollet Studios, Minneapolis, Minnesota
- Kim Kane — Cover art
- Dan Palenski – Graphics
- Sona Blakeslee — Typesetting
- Dan Corrigan – Photo
- Ruth Logsdon — Hand tinting
- John Hansen – Loyal crew
- Rob Lingenfelder – Loyal crew
- Dedicated to the memory of Roger Anderson

== Sales ==
8,340 vinyl albums and 797 cassettes.

== Alternate releases ==
Released on LP, May 1985, by the French record label New Rose (catalog number ROSE 57).

== Sources ==
- LP liner notes
- Trouser Press
- New Rose discography
