= Brand New Cadillac =

1959 song by Vince Taylor

Single by Vince Taylor and his Playboys
- A-side: "Pledgin' My Love"
- Released: April 1959
- Genre: Rockabilly
- Label: Parlophone R4539
- Songwriter: Vince Taylor

Vince Taylor and his Playboys singles chronology
"Right Behind You Baby" (1959)	"Brand New Cadillac" (1959)	"I'll be your Hero" (1960)

"Brand New Cadillac" (also recorded as "Cadillac") is a 1959 song by Vince Taylor, and was originally released as a B-side. Featured musicians on the released recording were: Joe Moretti (guitars), Lou Brian (piano), Brian Locking (bass) and Brian Bennett (drums). While not successful in the UK, it got a huge surge in popularity in continental Europe, especially the Nordic countries, with acts such as the Renegades and Hep Stars bringing it to number one in Finland and Sweden, respectively. Another Swedish act, the Shamrocks, brought the song to number one in France.

Vince Taylor's record company eventually learned of these recordings and copyright claims ensued. The case was settled on agreement to add Taylor's name to songwriting credits alongside the Renegades members—sharing the royalties equally. Neither Hep Stars nor Shamrocks were aware of Taylor's original version at the time of recordings. Therefore, it is possible to find their 1960s recordings credited either to (Kim) Brown-(Denys) Gibson- (Ian) Mallet-(Stuart Graham) Johnson or Brown-Gibson-Mallet-Johnson-Taylor. (Denys Gibson should not be confused with Terry Gibson of Downliners Sect.)

== Hep Stars version ==
"Cadillac"

Single by the Hep Stars

from the album We and Our Cadillac
- B-side: "Mashed Potatoes"
- Released: March 1965
- Recorded: February 1965
- Studio: Dieke Musik store Fruängen, Stockholm
- Genre: Rhythm and blues
- Length: 2:30
- Label: Olga
- Songwriters: Denys Gibson; Graham Johnson; Ian Mallet; Kim Brown
- Producer: Gerhard Dieke

The Hep Stars singles chronology
"Farmer John" (1965)	"Cadillac" (1965)	"Bald Headed Woman" (1965)

=== Background ===
Swedish rock group Hep Stars recorded "Brand New Cadillac" as a single in February 1965. Hep Stars promptly followed the Renegades rendition of the song, and shortened the title down to simply "Cadillac", with the Renegades gaining songwriting credits for the recording. It was later revealed that Hep Stars were not aware of Taylor's version of the song. Lead singer Svenne Hedlund had heard the Renegades version on Swedish radio show Nordisk Skivdisk, and saw the potential of it. His views were not shared with manager Åke Gerhard, who considered the song "a real piece of shit". They persuaded Gerhard by telling him that "if he didn't want it, perhaps some other record label would be more willing." The single version was recorded in the basement of a record store in the Stockholm suburb of Fruängen, with owner Gerhard Dieke producing the session.

During the time, Hep Stars had released only one single prior, in 1964. That was "Kana Kapila", which only reached number 26 on Tio i Topp. The group would then cut six other recordings in late December 1964, their first session with Benny Andersson on keyboards. However, they were still virtually unknown at this point. It wasn't until they appeared on a frantic episode of Drop-In on 23 March 1965 that their popularity started growing. Their song "A Tribute to Buddy Holly" had been released in February of that year, and quickly rose to the charts in late March following their appearance on Drop-In. It became their first chart hit, reaching number 5 on Kvällstoppen, remaining on that chart for ten weeks.

=== Release and reception ===
Olga Records then promptly released three singles in late March, those being "Summertime Blues", "Farmer John" and "Cadillac". While "Summertime Blues" failed to chart altogether, both "Farmer John" and "Cadillac managed to reach number one on Kvällstoppen. "Cadillac" entered the charts on the 13th of April 1965 at number 9, and reached the top-5 two weeks later at number 3. The following week it went to number 2 and it finally reached number one two weeks later, on 18 May that year. It peaked for one week before reaching number 2 once again. It exited the top-5 on 15 June and the top-10 on 29 June. It was last seen on Kvällstoppen on 13 July at a position of 19. In total, it spent 14 weeks on the chart, 11 of which were in the top-10. 7 of those weeks it stayed in the top-5. It fared similarly well on Tio i Topp, where it stayed for 12 weeks, peaking at number one.

The group recorded three versions of "Cadillac" in 1965. The first version was recorded in February 1965, and was the single release. On this version, Andersson plays rhythm guitar as well as his ordinary keyboards. This was due to the fact that regular guitarist Janne Frisk was not present at the recording session. A proper studio version was later recorded as the title and opening track of their debut album We and Our Cadillac, which was released in September 1965. This version features overdubbed tambourine as well as a more audiable organ solo, something not very evident on the single version. The third version was recorded live on 7 or 8 August 1965 at either Trollhättan or Västerås folkpark. This version opens with Hep Stars' tour manager Lennart Fernholm shouting out the band members names to a hysteric audience. This version was included as the opening track of Hep Stars on Stage in November 1965.

The single was well received. A contemporary review from the Norwegian tabloid Østlandets Blad remarked that the group did not give a good impression during a Norwegian TV appearance, noting that while the "Cadillac" single might be worth a listen, whether it was worth adding to your collection was another matter altogether. Norwegian newspaper tabloid Bergens Arbeiderblad commented “A powerful expression was frighteningly close to our lips when we first heard this record. Let's just say that we absolutely do not understand those who buy something like this”. Despite this, "Cadillac" peaked at No.1 in the Norwegian charts. In a retrospective review, Bruce Eder of AllMusic states that "'Cadillac' was a good representative of the group's sound during this period, a piece of lusty, bluesy garage rock. dominated by an agonized lead vocal, somewhere between Gene Vincent at his most quiet and menacing and David Aguilar of the Chocolate Watchband doing his best anguished teen emoting, and some very prominent organ riffs by Andersson. The group sounded sort of like a Swedish Paul Revere & the Raiders with a little more lyricism than that comparison implies." The track was the second most successful release in Sweden of that year, only surpassed by the Rolling Stones "(I Can't Get No) Satisfaction" "Cadillac" undoubtedly became one of Hep Stars biggest singles of the 1960s, and it is today often considered their signature song along with "Sunny Girl" and "I Natt Jag Drömde". The song remains a staple in Hep Stars repertoire to this day.

=== Personnel ===
Single version

- Svenne Hedlund – lead vocals
- Christer Pettersson – drums, backing vocals
- Benny Andersson – guitar, keyboards
- Lennart Hegland – bass guitar, backing vocals

We and Our Cadillac version

- Svenne Hedlund – lead vocals, tambourine
- Christer Pettersson – drums, backing vocals
- Janne Frisk – guitar, backing vocals
- Benny Andersson – keyboards
- Lennart Hegland – bass guitar

=== Chart positions ===
Chart (1965)	Peak position
Sweden (Kvällstoppen)	1
Sweden (Tio i Topp)	1
Norway (VG-lista)	1

== The Clash version ==
"Brand New Cadillac"

Song by the Clash

from the album London Calling
- Released: 14 December 1979
- Studio: Wessex, London
- Genre: Punk rock; rockabilly
- Length: 2:09
- Label: CBS; Epic
- Songwriter: Vince Taylor
- Producer: Guy Stevens

English rock band the Clash covered it on their third studio album, London Calling (1979). The song was the first to be recorded for the album. The band cite the song as "one of the first British rock'n'roll records" and had initially used it as a warm-up song before recording.

== Other covers and popular culture ==
=== Charting covers ===
- British band the Renegades credited the song to their band members. They dropped parts of the verses and also shortened the title to "Cadillac". It became number one on Finnish radio's people's choice list and number two on the singles' list in Finland in 1964.
- Another Swedish band, Shamrocks, recorded the song at the same time. Their version was a hit in France, reaching number one on the radio list as well as being successful in Germany and Japan.

=== Other covers and popular culture ===
- The song was covered in the 1960s by the British beat group Downliners Sect.
- In 2019 a poor quality tape of the Beatles emerged purportedly recorded in November 1959 containing a fragment of them playing "Brand New Cadillac" on Jim McCartney's gramophone.
- The Hergs, a rock band from Adelaide, Australia, released a version entitled "Cadillac" in 1967. The band was unsure of the songwriter and mistakenly attributed it to Chuck Berry.
- In The Netherlands it was released as a single by De Maskers under the original title "Brand New Cadillac" (Artone OS 25.317), as they had already recorded an instrumental called "Cadillac" (Artone DR 25.238).
- In 1971, Mott the Hoople, during a concert recording in Stockholm, inserted a verse of it in their version of Little Richard's "Keep a-Knockin' " (released on the live album A Tale of Two Cities in 2000).
- The Slickee Boys released a version on their 1976 debut EP, Hot and Cool (later compiled on their Here to Stay album).
- It was covered by the Swedish entertainer Eddie Meduza in 1976 as "E. Hitler inleder".
- Kim Fowley included a version with altered lyrics (called "Big Bad Cadillac") on his 1977 album Living in the Streets.
- Recorded by the Fall in 1978.
- A Dutch version was made by the Belgian rocker Bert De Coninck in 1979.
- In 1980 Canadian punk band Teenage Head recorded a version on their second album Frantic City.
- Covered by the Milkshakes in 1984.
- By Inner City Unit in 1985.
- By Leeds-based indie band Athletes Foot in 1986.
- By the Australian alternative rock band Tlot Tlot in 1993 as "Television".
- It was covered by the Brian Setzer Orchestra on their self-titled debut album in 1994.
- By Wayne Hancock on his 1997 album, That's What Daddy Wants.
- The Swedish rockabilly band the Go Getters recorded a cover on their 2003 album "Motormouth".
- Covered with altered lyrics as "Brand New Impala" by Manic Hispanic on their 2003 album Mijo Goes To Jr. College
- The song was used in a 2014 Cadillac television commercial.
- By RudeGRL + CC in a 2021 single.
- The song has been included at many Van Morrison concerts, appearing as a medley with "Goin' Down Geneva", which is about Taylor.
- The lead singer in Hep Stars Sven Hedlund recorded a new version in 1978 with his wife Charlotte Walker (Svenne & Lotta) on their LP album "Bring It On Home" (Polar Records POLS 281, produced by Michael B. Tretow).

== Sources ==
- Pekka Gronow, Jake Nyman ym (2005), Suomi soi osa 4 s.112 (in Finnish), (sarja 1-4), Tammi, ISBN 951-31-2503-3
- Dan-Eric Landen, Carl Magnus Palm (2004), Cadillac Madness, den otroliga berättelsen om Hep Stars (in Swedish), Premium Publishing, ISBN 91-89136-04-7
