= Limp (disambiguation) =

A limp is a type of asymmetric abnormality of the gait.

Limp or LIMP may also refer to:

== Music ==
- "Limp" (song) from Fiona Apple's When the Pawn...
- Limp (band), a 1990s Californian punk group
- Limp Records, a Maryland music publisher (1978–1982)

== Places ==
- Limp, Kentucky, U.S.
- Limp, South Carolina, U.S.
- Long Island Motor Parkway, New York, U.S.
- Parma Airport, Italy (ICAO airport code: LIMP)

== Other uses ==
- limping, a betting pattern in the poker card game
- Liberal Imperialists, British party political faction
