= John Neel =

- Born: John E. Neel; September 21, 1930; Mobile, Alabama, U.S.
- Died: September 22, 1973 (aged 43) Hollywood, California, U.S.
- Genres: Jazz, Now Sound
- Occupation(s): Composer, conductor, musician

John E. Neel (September 21, 1930 – September 22, 1973) was an American composer, conductor and musician, who recorded in the 1960s and early 1970s.

Born in Mobile, Alabama by the early 1960s he worked in Los Angeles as a composer and conductor of film soundtracks. In the late 1950s, he wrote cues for several TV westerns, like Sugarfoot and Maverick. Along with lyricist Roger Nichols, he also wrote the theme songs for the films High School Caesar and Date Bait.

In 1963, he composed and conducted the album Blue Martini, which featured saxophonist Plas Johnson and was released by Äva Records. According to Neel, writing in the album's liner notes, the recording aimed for a new "arrangement form" incorporating solo improvisations and an outer orchestral "shell". In 1969, Neel recorded a second album, John Neel's Amazing Marching Machine, released by Epic Records. He also recorded for the Paramount label in the early 1970s.

Neel died in California in 1973, aged 43.
