= IlyAIMY =

US folk music band

ilyAIMY

Background information
- Origin: Baltimore, Maryland, United States
- Genres: Rock, neo-folk, acoustic rock
- Years active: 1999–present
- Members: rob Hinkal, Heather Aubrey Lloyd, Kristen Jones, Rowan Corbett, Sharif Kellog, Joey Jenkins
- Website: www.ilyaimy.com

ilyAIMY (/ˌɪlˈjeɪmiː/; stylized as ilyĀIMY) is an American percussive acoustic rock band.

ilyAIMY has developed a following primarily through folk music festivals such as Eddie's Attic Acoustic Shootout and coffeehouses in the Mid-Atlantic, northeastern, and Midwestern areas of the United States. ilyAIMY has toured in many parts of the United States, Canada, and Mexico. The band is symbolized by an iconic spine created by Hinkal.

== Members ==
- rob Hinkal – acoustic guitar, vocals
- Heather Aubrey Lloyd – acoustic guitar, vocals, cajón, djembe
- Kristen Jones – cello, electric cello, vocals
- Rowan Corbett – djembe, bones, cajón, percussion, vocals
- Keola Yamada – bass guitar, keyboard
- Joey Jenkins – percussion

=== Former Members ===
- Audrey Engdahl – acoustic guitar, vocals
- Frank Rusch – bass guitar
- Alfred Kamajian – percussion

== History ==
ilyAIMY was originally inspired by a four-member musical ensemble called "i love you And I MIss You" formed in the mid-1990s, with members rob Hinkal, William Schaff, Carin Wagner (now Sloan), and Sonny Roelle, all of whom were students at the Maryland Institute College of Art. The band released a two-cassette (90 minutes each) collection of songs, and it recorded another that was not released.

ilyAIMY was formed in 1999. The band released its first album under the name ilyAIMY in 2003. Heather Aubry Lloyd joined the band in the summer of 2001. Rowan Corbett and Sharif joined around 2003. Kristen Jones joined in 2009. Joey Jenkins joined around 2017.

The band, primarily in the form of Hinkal and Lloyd, has toured the country since September 1, 2003.

The band is known for its high-energy blend of folk, jazz, rock, soul, and blues.

== Name etymology ==
The name ilyAIMY is an acronym for "I love you and I miss you", inspired by William Schaff's musical ensemble of the same name.

== Discography ==
- I Love You and I Miss You, 1996
- Jump starting the Bus, 1997
- The Grave, 1998
- Strength in Hare, 1998
- Clockwork Wooden Mouse Dreams, 1998
- Strength in Hare - A Mere Demonstration, 2000
- Wingsweep/Wingswept, 2000
- Bulldozer Not Included, 2001
- Myxomatosis Failed, 2003
- On Luck On Fumes On Spit On Love, 2003
- Myxomatosis Took Its Toll, 2005
- the fifth circle, 2006
- Between Lover and Twilight, 2007
- A Gift for Saint Cecilia, 2009
- Another Life/Another Live (Double CD), 2013
- Cicada, 2017
- Live at the New Deal Cafe, 2020
- Chords of Courage Volume One, 2022
- Let Us Show You How to End It (Vol. 1) (EP), 2025
- Let Us Show You How to End It (Vol. 2) (EP), 2026
- Let Us Show You How to End It (Double CD), 2026

=== Heather Aubrey Lloyd ===
- Samples, 2010 (as Heather Lloyd)
- A Message in the Mess, 2017
- The Lucky Ones, 2018

=== Kristen Jones ===
- Seasons, 2017

== Book ==
- Eat Like An Acoustic Grunge Band, 2017. ISBN 9781365941962

== Awards ==
- 2021: Heather Aubrey Lloyd – Mid-Atlantic Song Contest – Gold in Covid-19 Song Category for "My Kinda Quarantiner"
- 2021: Heather Aubrey Lloyd – Northeast Regional Folk Alliance award for "My Kinda Quarantiner"
- 2021: rob Hinkal – Mid-Atlantic Song Contest Freedom Song Category for "unEven"
- 2019-2020: Mid-Atlantic Song Contest, Adult Contemporary – Grand Prize Winner
- 2019: Heather Aubry Lloyd – Bernard/Ebb Songwriting Award (Adult Category)
- 2017–2018: SERFA – Formal Showcase – Nat'l Women's Music Fest – New Artist
- 2017-2018: Falcon Ridge Folk Fest – Most Wanted
- 2017-2018: Telluride Folk Fest – (4th) Troubadour
- 2017-2018: Mid-Atlantic Song Contest – Director's Award, Album of the Year
- 2017-2018: Rocky Mtn. Folks Fest – Honorable Mention
- 2016: American Songwriter Magazine Lyric Contest – Honorable Mention
- 2015: Washington Area Music Awards "Best Contemporary Folk / Acoustic Artist"
- 2014: Washington Area Music Awards "Best Contemporary Folk / Acoustic Artist"
- 2013: Sound Off Live!
- 2012: Northeast Regional Folk Alliance Formal Showcase Artist
- 2012: Falcon Ridge Folk Festival Most-Wanted Artist
- 2011: Northeast Regional Folk Alliance DJ Showcase Artist
- 2011: Falcon Ridge Folk Festival Emerging Artist
- 2010: Mid-Atlantic Formal Showcase Artist – National Association for Campus Activities
- 2009: Finalist Eddie's Attic Acoustic Open Mic Shootout
- 2007: "In the Water" selected as "One of the Best Songs of 2006" by www.indieacoustic.com
- 2006: Heather Aubry Lloyd – Honorable Mention in the International Narrative Song Contest ("In the Water")
- 2006: Heather Aubry Lloyd – Winner of the Cape Fear Folk Festival High Noon Shootout
- 2006: Heather Aubry Lloyd – Finalist at the Susquehanna Music and Arts Festival Singer/Songwriter Competition
- 2005: Finalists at Eddie's Attic Acoustic Open Mic Shootout XXII
- 2005: rob Hinkal – Finalist at the Grassy Hill Kerrville New Folk
- 2005: rob Hinkal – 3rd place at the Susquehanna Music and Arts Festival Singer/Songwriter Competition
- 2005: Heather Aubry Lloyd – Finalist at the Susquehanna Music and Arts Festival Singer/Songwriter Competition
- 2004: Winner at the Takoma Park Folk Festival Emerging Artist Showcase
- 2002: Nominated Best Contemporary Folk Group or Duo, Washington Area Music Association
- 2001: Nominated Best Alternative Rock Album for Wingsweep/Wingswept, Washington Area Music Association
