= First Demo 12/29/80 =

EP by State of Alert
- Released: March 18, 2014
- Recorded: December 29, 1980
- Studios: Inner Ear Studios, Arlington, Virginia
- Genre: Hardcore punk
- Labels: Dischord; 177
- Producer: Skip Groff

State of Alert chronology
No Policy (1981)	First Demo 12/29/80 (2014)

First Demo 12/29/80 is an EP by American hardcore punk band State of Alert. It contains eight tracks recorded on December 29, 1980, by engineer Don Zientara at the group's first studio session with Skip Groff at Inner Ear Studios in Arlington, Virginia. The EP was released as a seven-inch, 45 rpm vinyl record in March 2014 by Dischord Records.

S.O.A. was formed in October 1980 by 19-year-old Henry Garfield, now known as Henry Rollins, with guitarist Michael Hampton, bassist Wendel Blow, and drummer Simon Jacobsen. The group performed a total of nine shows before disbanding in July 1981, and, prior to the release of First Demo, had issued less than 30 minutes of music.

The track titled "Gonna Have to Fight" was included on the band's 1981 debut release, No Policy, while "Disease" and "Stepping Stone Party" were originally issued on the 1982 Dischord sampler Flex Your Head. The remaining tracks are previously unreleased alternate versions of songs that also appeared on No Policy.

== Reception ==
Professional ratings
Review scores
Source	Rating
AllMusic	3/5 stars
The Vinyl District	A

In a review for AllMusic, Mark Deming wrote: "Most of First Demo sounds like standard-issue hardcore of the era... energetic but not especially remarkable... D.C. hardcore completists and folks interested in Henry Rollins' first baby steps in punk rock will want to have this historical document, but while it packs some kicks, don't expect to be enlightened."

James Bennett of SLUG Magazine stated: "This is a forceful, quick single that allows the listener to better understand why 1980s D.C. was so important to the development of American Hardcore."

The Washington City Paper's Brent Burton noted that the band is "surprisingly confident," and commented: "the S.O.A demo is a valuable reminder of a time when D.C. punks were exploring the outer limits of what it meant to be hardcore."

Writing for Verbicide, Chris Martin called the album a "whirlwind of unbridled energy," and remarked: "While SOA was far from groundbreaking, their music is a must listen for punk lovers everywhere. Garfield and crew packed more punch into their 40-second songs than many musicians did in a lifetime. First Demo is a nice addition to their minimal collection."

In an article for The Quietus, Andrew Holter described "Gonna Have to Fight" as "a window into the world of a young man who has fully accepted the violence that his adopted subculture invites from off-duty Marines, Southern Maryland rednecks, and the like." He wrote: "It's self-defence he's urging, yes, but you can hear in the voice that this kid has internalised the words of Mick Jones: 'And if I get aggression, I give it two times back'."

== Track listing ==
Track timings not provided.

1. "Public Defender"
2. "Gonna Have to Fight"
3. "Gang Fight"
4. "Disease"
5. "Draw a Blank"
6. "War Zone"
7. "Riot"
8. "Stepping Stone Party"

== Personnel ==
- Henry Garfield – vocals
- Michael Hampton – guitar
- Wendel Blow – bass
- Simon Jacobsen – drums
