= Doctor Boogie =

Doctor Boogie or Dr Boogie may refer to:

- Doctor Boogie, a long-running Belgian radio show on Classic 21
- Dr Boogie, a pseudonym for Walter de Paduwa, presenter of the Doctor Boogie radio show
- Doctor Boogie, a 1971 song by Flamin' Groovies on their album Teenage Head
- Doctor Boogie, a song on the Slickee Boys' 1977 album Separated Vegetables
- Doctor Boogie, a 1979 album by Don Downing.
