= No Response =

Song written by Benny Andersson

Single by the Hep Stars

from the album We and Our Cadillac
- B-side: "Rented Tuxedo"
- Released: September 1965
- Recorded: August 1965
- Studio: Europafilm Studios, Stockholm
- Genre: Pop
- Length: 1:35
- Label: Olga
- Songwriter: Benny Andersson
- Producer: Gert Palmcrantz

The Hep Stars singles chronology
"Bald Headed Woman" (1965)	"No Response" (1965)	"So Mystifying" (1965)

"No Response" is a song written by Benny Andersson, first recorded by Swedish rock group Hep Stars and released as a single in September 1965. The song was written in response to criticism drawn from other Swedish beat groups, including Shanes and Tages for their inability to write own material.

The song was the first original composition by Andersson, who has later had a negative impression of it. "No Response" became a hit in Sweden, and was the third and final single issued from their debut album We and Our Cadillac.

== Background ==
Hep Stars had achieved immense popularity in early April 1965 with tracks such as "A Tribute to Buddy Holly", "Farmer John", "Cadillac" and "Bald Headed Woman" all charting on Kvällstoppen and Tio i Topp. The band had now a fanbase similar to the Beatles, and a phenomenon regarding Hep Stars just like Beatlemania had begun in Sweden during this period. However, the band had attracted criticism from both the press and contemporary rock bands. They stated that the Hep Stars had become hugely successful by only performing covers of American rhythm and blues. A great example of this would be that contemporary beat group Tages had composed their four first singles, whereas all six of Hep Stars singles had been covers.

Andersson had been greatly intrigued and inspired by the Beatles ability to write their own material, and had attempted some himself to no avail. However, in May 1965, he sat down and started composing a song which would eventually become "No Response." He has also admitted that his grasp for the English was pretty vague, and that he had resorted to using an English dictionary for writing the lyrics.

I wrote "No Response" after having heard a song that I liked. But I only liked parts of it. I thought, I guess I could change that one around a bit. The song holds together pretty well, but the lyrics are just awful

— Benny Andersson, in Carl Magnus Palm, Bright Lights, Dark Shadows: The Real Story of ABBA page 115

Finally, he invited lead singer Svenne Hedlund to his apartment and played the song for him. Hedlund stated that "I thought it was great to finally have a song that one of us had written, and especially since he had written a Fifties-style rock song which still had a Sixties feel in the chorus. I liked the song immediately, and I felt that it could be a hit."

== Release ==
The song was a part of their repertoire during the summer of 1965, and after being well received by fans it was recorded and released as a single in September 1965 by Olga Records. It first entered Kvällstoppen on 14 September 1965 at a position of 14. The following week the song had climbed to number 12, and on 28 September it had reached the top-10 at number 6. It first entered the top-10 the following week at number 4, before slowly progressing to number 3 the following week. On 19 October it had reached its peak at number 2, a position it held for two weeks. On 2 November it had once again returned to number 3 and the following week it had ascended to number 5. It exited the top-5 the following week and exited the top-10 on 21 December 1965. It was last spotted on the chart on 18 January 1966 at number 19. It was also very successful on Tio i Topp, where it stayed for 10 weeks, peaking at number 3.

Although a huge chart success, Andersson was never fond of the song, and has expressed disapproval for it. He stated in an interview that he didn't know much English at the time of writing, and that it turned out pretty generic, but that he realized that he was able to write own material. He also stated that despite his being his first composition, it is barely acceptable. In another interview, he stated "the best thing was that it got me starting writing. It wasn't anything special. It's got a functioning verse and chorus, something that is required, but nothing more. But it became our rescue, previously Hep Stars had no original compositions, we just didn't know how you did them. I don't think I knew either, it just became a song. In the same interview however, he admitted that he was proud when he heard the song on the radio and that it had climbed Tio i Topp.

The song is used as the opening track of side two on the Hep Stars debut album We and Our Cadillac and is the only original composition on the album. The song is also featured on the group's second release, the live album Hep Stars on Stage.

== Personnel ==
=== Hep Stars ===
- Svenne Hedlund – lead vocals
- Janne Frisk – guitar, backing vocals
- Lennart Hegland – backing vocals
- Christer Petterson – drums, backing vocals
- Benny Andersson – keyboards

=== Other personnel ===
- Lennart Fernholm – bass guitar
- Gert Palmcrantz – producer

== Charts ==
Chart (1965–1966)	Peak position
Sweden (Kvällstoppen)	2
Sweden (Tio i Topp)	3
Norway (VG-lista)	6
Finland (The Official Finnish Charts)	35
