= Bald Headed Woman =

Traditional blues song

Song by the Kinks

from the album Kinks
- Released: 2 October 1964
- Recorded: August 1964
- Studio: Pye, London
- Genre: R&B; proto-punk
- Label: Pye
- Songwriter: Shel Talmy
- Producer: Talmy

"Bald Headed Woman" is a traditional blues song, covered by the English rock band the Kinks on their eponymous debut studio album in 1964. Another British rock band, the Who, recorded it in 1964 as the B-side of their first top-ten single "I Can't Explain". Outside of traditional African American blues and folk artists such as Lightnin' Hopkins and Odetta, the song had been previously covered by other pop artists of the time, including Harry Belafonte on the 1960 album Swing Dat Hammer. It became a number one hit on Kvällstoppen for Swedish rock group Hep Stars in 1965.

== The Kinks version ==
"Bald Headed Woman" was the one of two songs "written" by Shel Talmy for their debut album Kinks, the other being the similarly titled "I've Been Driving on Bald Mountain". Both of them were American folk songs, and the band were persuaded by Talmy to record them for their debut. Unbeknownst to them, however, was that Talmy had claimed songwriting credits for both songs (which had been in the public domain) and as a result gain royalties for them.

They were my perks, a way for me to get in on the publishing royalties, they were just folk things I adapted. Old public domain folk songs.

— Shel Talmy, Ray Davies: Not Like Everybody Else page 44

The Kinks incorporated neither songs into their setlist and it was forgotten after being recorded. Both tracks are included on the US issue of Kinks, You Really Got Me.

=== Personnel ===
The Kinks

- Ray Davies – lead vocals, acoustic guitar
- Dave Davies – lead guitar, backing vocals
- Pete Quaife – bass guitar, backing vocals
- Mick Avory – drums, tambourine

Additional personnel

- Jon Lord – organ, piano
- Shel Talmy – producer

== The Who version ==
"Bald Headed Woman"

Single by the Who
- A-side: "I Can't Explain"
- Released: December 1964 (US); 15 January 1965 (UK)
- Recorded: 9–14 November 1964
- Studio: IBC Studios, London, England
- Genre: Blues rock, power pop
- Length: 2:32
- Label: Brunswick (UK); Decca (US)
- Songwriter: Talmy
- Producer: Talmy

The Who singles chronology
"Zoot Suit/I'm the Face" (1964)	"Bald Headed Woman" (1964)	"Anyway, Anyhow, Anywhere" (1965)

As with the Talmy-produced Kinks, the Who were persuaded to record this so that Shel Talmy could receive publishing royalties. The recording was done in the second week of November 1964. Talmy, producing the session, was assisted by studio engineer Glyn Johns. Jimmy Page also plays on the Who's version, although to a lesser extent. "It wasn't really lead," he later clarified, "Just a couple of phrases." Page played on the recording due to him owning the only fuzzbox in the UK.

The Fuzz guitar droning throughout is played by Jimmy Page; the reason being, he owned the only Fuzzbox in the country at that time. The words express my sentiments exactly – a bald headed woman would make me pretty mean, too. My favourite part of this track is the opening of the harmonica solo, where Roger puts the harmonica into his mouth the wrong way around.

— John Entwistle

Often considered one of their conventional and finest rhythm and blues recordings, "Bald Headed Woman" was first issued as the B-side of the Who's second single "I Can't Explain". The single was a hit in the UK, reaching number eight on the UK Singles Chart. It also gained some popularity in the US, reaching a respectable number ninety-three on the Billboard Hot 100. The song never got a proper album release for over twenty years, first being released on the album Who’s Missing in 1987. It has since been featured on deluxe editions of My Generation along with "I Can't Explain" and other singles of the era.

=== Personnel ===
The Who

- Roger Daltrey – lead vocals, harmonica, handclaps
- Pete Townshend – rhythm guitar, backing vocals
- John Entwistle – bass guitar, backing vocals
- Keith Moon – drums

Additional Personnel

- Perry Ford – piano
- Jimmy Page – lead fuzz guitar
- Shel Talmy – producer

== Hep Stars version ==
"Bald Headed Woman"

Single by Hep Stars

from the album We and Our Cadillac
- B-side: "Lonesome Town"
- Released: June 1965
- Recorded: 3 June 1965
- Studio: Phillips Studio, Stockholm
- Genre: Rhythm and blues; pop
- Length: 2:32
- Label: Olga
- Songwriter: Talmy
- Producer: Gert Palmcrantz

Hep Stars singles chronology
"Cadillac" (1965)	"Bald Headed Woman" (1965)	"No Response" (1965)

Swedish rock group Hep Stars recorded "Bald Headed Woman" as a follow-up to their smash-hit rendition of "Cadillac" on 3 June 1965. The single became the Hep Stars first to be produced by Gert Palmcrantz, who was a skilled record producer and studio engineer. Their previous recordings had been produced by their manager Åke Gerhard. "Bald Headed Woman" is also notable for being one of the Hep Stars first recordings in a professional studio, as all their previous recordings had been done in makeshift locations, including a basement of a school.

The Hep Stars rendition of "Bald Headed Woman" is an entire remake, with the bass guitar providing a significant part of the tune. Due to the composition, it was a perfect follow-up to "Cadillac" as both share similar themes, of the song slowly building up before reaching a frantic and intense climax. The song became one of the first recordings by Hep Stars to feature their tour manager Lennart Fernholm on bass guitar. He took over from official bass guitarist and Kapellmeister Lelle Hegland and is often considered the unofficial "sixth" Hep Star. Hegland does not appear on the recording at all.

Released in June 1965 by Olga Records, "Bald Headed Woman" became a smash hit on the Swedish record parade, Kvällstoppen. First entering the charts on the sixth of July 1965 at a position of eighteen, it quickly climbed to the top ten the following week, at number eight. "Bald Headed Woman" first reached the top-five on the twenty-seventh of July at number eight, and reached number one on the third of August, a position it held for two consecutive weeks. It then stayed in the top-five for an additional four weeks before dropping into the top-twenty, and it was last spotted on the fifth of October that year. In total, it was in the top-twenty for fourteen weeks, of which it spent nine in the top ten. It was similarly successful on Tio i Topp, reaching number 1 and staying on that chart for eight weeks.

Bruce Eder of AllMusic states that "'Bald Headed Woman' was convincingly bluesy and threatening". The song was featured on both their studio album We and Our Cadillac and a live version on their live album Hep Stars on Stage.

=== Personnel ===
Hep Stars

- Svenne Hedlund – lead vocals
- Benny Andersson – keyboards
- Janne Frisk – guitar, backing vocals
- Christer Petterson – drums

Additional personnel

- Lennart Fernholm – bass
- Gert Palmcrantz – producer

=== Chart positions ===
Chart (1965)	Peak position
Sweden (Kvällstoppen)	1
Sweden (Tio i Topp)	1
Norway (VG-lista)	8
Finland (The Official Finnish Charts)	15
