= Black Market Baby =

American punk rock band

- Origin: Washington, D.C.
- Genre: Hardcore punk
- Years active: 1980–1997
- Labels: Fountain of Youth Records, Limp Records, Y&T Music, Bitzcore Records, Dr. Strange Records
- Members: Boyd Farrell; Paul Cleary; Keith Campbell; Tommy Carr; Mike Dolfi; Scott Logan; Adrian (aka John) Ossea; Mike Donegan; Neil Ekberg
- Website: senselessofferings.com

Black Market Baby was an American punk rock band from Washington, D.C. They were one of the original groups who made up the punk rock scene in the Washington area in the 1980s.

== History ==
The band was formed in 1980 by vocalist Boyd Farrell and bassist Paul Cleary, whose band Snitch had just broken up. Cleary was also playing in a band called Trenchmouth (not the Chicago band of the same name). They recruited guitarist Keith Campbell, who was playing with D. Ceats, and drummer Tommy Carr, who was playing with the Penetrators (not the California band of the same name). They started rehearsing in Trenchmouth's rehearsal space (without their knowledge), and performed for the first time when they opened for Tru Fax and the Insaniacs. They immediately displayed a unique talent for riling up their audiences and began playing packed shows.

In 1981, they independently released their first singles, "America's Youth" and "Crimes of Passion". Their manager absconded with some of their money. Cleary was kicked out the band; he was replaced on bass by Mike Dolfi, who played for the Resistors and The Penetrators. Campbell left and was replaced by Scott Logan. That same year, they were picked up by Limp, the label of punk guru Skip Groff, who also owned the Rockville, Maryland record store Yesterday and Today (Y&T), which was the center of much of Washington D.C.'s punk and alternative music scenes. Limp released the singles "Potential Suicide" and "Youth Crimes", which Groff produced. He also included one of their songs on Limp's 1981 punk compilation album Connected.

In 1982, they were picked up by Fountain of Youth Records, which released their 1983 album Senseless Offerings. Songs written by Farrel, Dolfi and Carr were powerful and spirited in the DC scene, Campbell returned, Dolfi and Carr left and Mike Donegan joined on bass. Carr was replaced by drummer Adrian Ossea (aka John Ossea), who came from the band Pentagram. Fountain of Youth included them in its 1984 compilation Bouncing Babies, but dropped them. Ossea, who was dealing with addiction, fell off the wagon (he died of a cocaine overdose in 1989, at age 36). Drummer Neil Ekberg briefly filled in on drums, then Carr returned.

In 1986, Minor Threat frontman Ian MacKaye recorded the band's Black Market Baby's second LP. The only hope of releasing this album was with Jem Records, but they were unable to negotiate a deal. They broke up in January 1988 following a farewell show. In 1990, Groff released their single "World At War"; in 1991, Bitzcore Records released the previously recorded music as the album Baby on Board. In the same year, Bitzcore released the curated compilation, Baby Takes - The Collection.

Black Market Baby loosely re-formed in 1993, to open for Agent Orange, then played occasional shows before breaking up for good in 1997.

Cleary joined Iron Cross, Campbell joined the DC band Jakkpot, then he and Farrell formed the band Vile Geezers.

Black Market Baby had several challenges which kept them from succeeding past their local area. The first was that, according to Farrell, they were "heavy, heavy drinkers". That led to "brawling", including with police. Whereas other successful local bands would head to New York to find record companies and larger audiences, Black Market Baby insisted on staying in the Washington area, where labels were in short supply. They also didn't tour; Farrell had a young family and would only do occasional week-ends away. And the endless line-up changes didn't help.

In 2006, Dr. Strange Records released Coulda… Shoulda… Woulda: The Black Market Baby Collection a 26-track compilation album of the band's 1980s material. In 2007, their song "Body Count" was used in the 2007 documentary Punk's Not Dead. In 2019, the song "Gunpoint Affection" was used in the Netflix series, Stranger Things, Season 3, "Chapter Two: The Mall Rats."

== Discography ==
Albums

- Senseless Offerings (1983), Fountain of Youth
- Baby On Board (1991), Bitzcore
- Baby Takes (The Collection) (1991), Bitzcore
- Coulda… Shoulda… Woulda: The Black Market Baby Collection (2006), Dr. Strange

Singles

- "America's Youth" / "Crimes of Passion" (1981), Independent
- "Potential Suicide" / "Youth Crimes" (1981), Limp Records
- "Drunk and Disorderly" / "Just Like All The Others" (1990), Y&T Music
- "Bloodstreet Boys" / "It's Too Late" (2000), 007 Records

Splits

- Black Market Baby / The Nurses (1981), Limp Records
- Bad Brains / Black Market Baby (1990), Y&T Music

Compilation inclusions

- Connected (1981), Limp Records
- Bouncing Babies (1983), Fountain of Youth
- Flipside Vinyl Fanzine Vol.1 (1984) LP, Flipside
- 9:30 Live - A Time, A Place, A Scene (1997), Adelphi Records

== See also ==
- 9:30 Club
