= The Renegades (band) =

British band

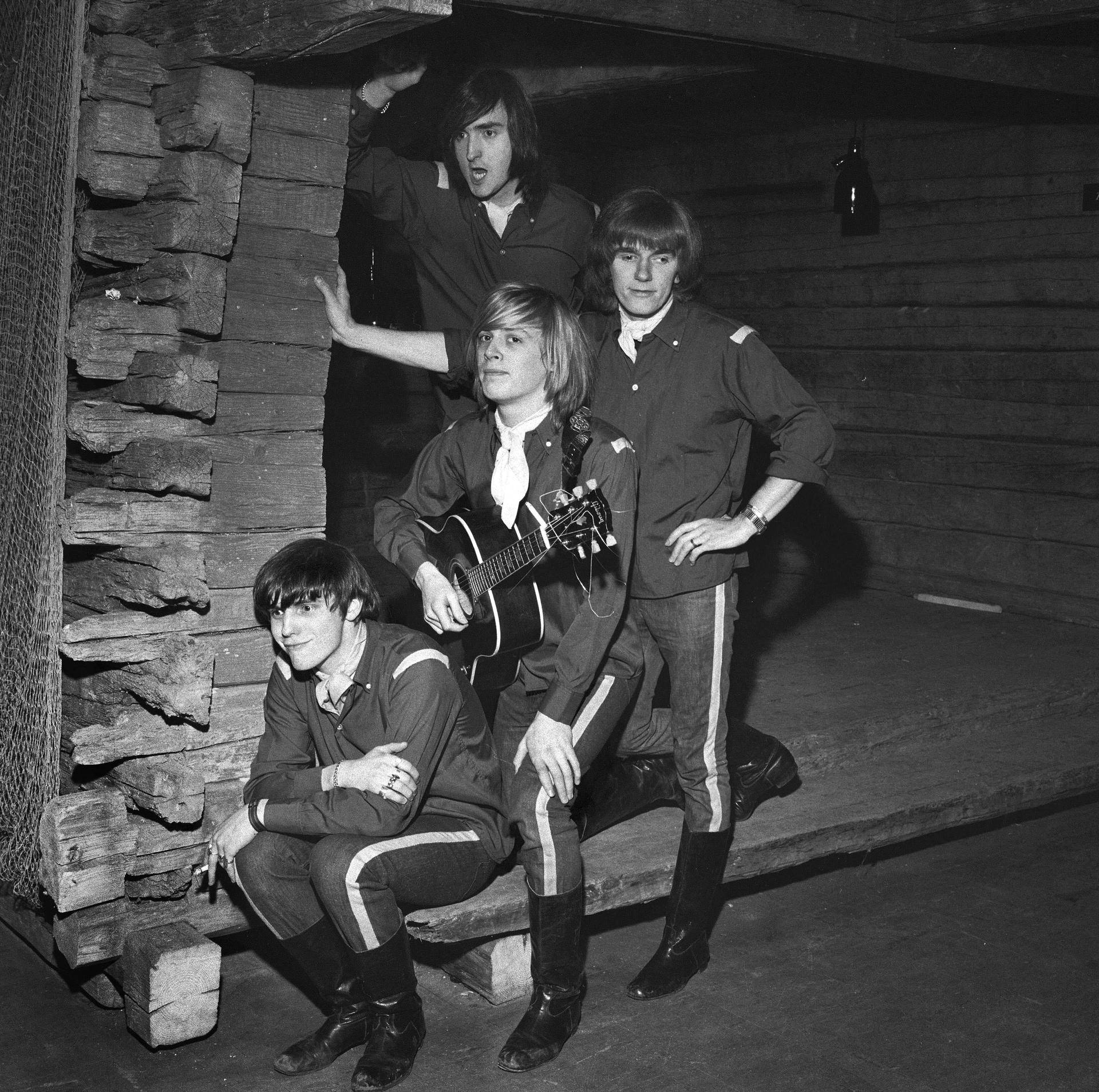
- Front to back: Ian Mallett, Kim Brown, Graham Johnson, Denys Gibson

Background information
- Origin: Birmingham, United Kingdom
- Years active: 1960-1971
- Past members: Kim Brown; Denys Gibson; Joe Dunnett; Mick Webley; Ian Mallet; Graham Johnson

The Renegades were a British rock band which started out in Birmingham, England in 1960. The band never had much success in their home country, but they became popular in Finland in the 1960s and in Italy from 1966 until their breakup in 1971.

In the mid-1970s Kim Brown and Mick Webley, with other musicians, went on to form the band Kim & The Cadillacs.

== History ==
The Renegades formed in the early 1960s in Perry Barr, Birmingham. The original lineup included Kim Brown on vocals, lead guitar and keyboard, Denys "Denny" Gibson on guitar, Ian Mallet on bass, and Graham Johnson on drums. Their track “Hungarian Mod”, a reworking of Franz Liszt’s “Hungarian Rhapsody” in a Mod style, was featured on 1964’s Brum Beat, a compilation album put together by David Gooch to promote local Birmingham bands.

They were the uncredited artists on the LP The Mersey Sound, released in 1964, which contained songs representing and in the style of the Mersey sound including five cover versions of Lennon/McCartney songs.

Not finding much of a foothold in England, the band found greater success in Finland after a tour in Helsinki in October 1964. Causing a kind of fanaticism in Finland nearly comparable to Beatlemania in the UK, the Renegades became known for their energetic stage performances, as well as the outfits they wore, styled after American Civil War era Cavalry uniforms. In addition to their own songs, they often covered rock and R&B standards, such as Ray Charles’ “What'd I Say”. While their single “Cadillac” reached number two on the Finnish charts in 1964, the band never had a number one hit. The band also appeared in the Finnish 1966 film Topralli, by director Yrjö Tähtelä.

The Renegades also toured and released music in Germany, France, Switzerland, Sweden, and Italy. The band also proved to be popular in Italy, and the group was invited to play at the Italian Sanremo Music Festival in 1966.

Denys Gibson left the band at the end of 1966 and was replaced by Joe Dunnett. Dunnett was subsequently replaced in September 1967 by Mick Webley.

Between 1966 and 1970, The Renegades recorded several singles for Italian release, most sung in Italian, including “L’amore é Blu”, which reached the Italian Top Twenty. The group eventually disbanded in 1971, with Brown and Webley going on to form the band Kim & The Cadillacs, with Johnson as their manager.

Footage of the band appears in Finnish Director, Aki Kaurismäki's 1994 film, Take Care of Your Scarf, Tatiana.

In 2019, drummer Graham Johnson, the last original living member of the Renegades, played three concerts in Helsinki with the Finnish group Pekka Tiilikainen & Beatmakers called "The Renegades Revisited". They played several more concerts in the summer of 2021.

Ian Mallett died in 2007, Kim Brown died in 2011, Graham Johnson died after an incurable and undiagnosed illness on 28 March 2025

== Members ==
- Kim Brown - vocals, guitar, keyboards
- Denys Gibson - guitar (1960-1966)
- Joe Dunnett - guitar (1966-1967)
- Mick Webley - guitar (1967-1971)
- Ian Mallet - bass
- Graham Johnson - drums

== Selected discography ==
In UK

- The Mersey Sound (1964, uncredited, on Fidelio label)

In Finland

- Cadillac (1964)
- The Renegades (1965)
- The Renegades aka The Renegades 2 (1965)
- The Renegades Story (1978) compilation album

In Italy

- Una sera al Piper n° 1 (1966, compilation)
- Half and half (1967)
- L'interrogatorio - Soundtrack (1970)
- Lettere d'amore (1971, single)
