= High School Caesar =

- Directed by: O'Dale Ireland
- Written by: O'Dale Ireland (story) & Ethelmae Wilson Page (story) & Robert Slaven (story); Ethelmae Wilson Page (screenplay) & Robert Slaven (screenplay)
- Produced by: George Caras (associate producer); Nicholas Carras (associate producer); O'Dale Ireland (producer); George S. Reppas (executive producer)
- Starring: John Ashley
- Cinematography: Harry Birch
- Edited by: Anthony DiMarco
- Music by: Nicholas Carras
- Distributed by: Filmgroup
- Release date: November 1960
- Running time: 75 minutes
- Country: United States
- Language: English
- Budget: $100,000 est.

High School Caesar is a 1960 American film directed by O'Dale Ireland. Matt Stevens (John Ashley) is the "guy with the power" at his high school but everyone despises him. He isn't, after all, known for his fairness and generosity. The tables are turned, however, when his fellow students resent his power and show him up at a drag race. Filmgroup released the film as a double feature with Date Bait.

== Plot ==
Movie opens with Matt Stevens and his leather-jacket gang looking over a boy they just beat up for failing to pay his protection money. Matt is running for class president of Wilson High School and he tears down his opponents campaign sign. He wins the election by fixing the results. He announces that there will be more dances but they will each pay 25¢ collected by class treasurer Crickett who idolizes Matt. They will buy a Boxer dog, the school's mascot. Matt charges for school tests and most everything and many students despise him. He isn't, after all, known for his fairness and generosity. But money is no substitute for lack of love from his always traveling parents.

Kelly Roberts tries to stand up to Matt and in fact wins a drag race against him and as a result wins Matt's gold coin. Matt's girlfriend Lita tells the new girl Wanda that she has a date lined up with Crickett. Wanda tells her that no one tells her whom to date. Later Bob defends her when he punches Matt at the local hangout Students and even the school principal are turning on Matt.

Matt and Crickett wait on a back road for Kelly to drive by. Matt drives up on Kelly and rear ends him. Then Matt races alongside Kelly causing Crickett to be afraid. Then as a bridge comes ahead on the road, Kelly is forced off the road and dies in the accident. Matt gets Crickett to promise secrecy and let others find the body. Wanda rebuffs kisses and advances from Matt and as she runs from his car, she sees the recent car damage. Friends find Kelly at the bridge accident scene. Everyone suspects Matt and he finds himself alone at his birthday party that night.

== Cast ==
- John Ashley as Matt Stevens
- Gary Vinson as Bob Williams
- Steve Stevens as Crickett Davis
- Lowell Brown as Kelly Roberts
- Judy Nugent as Wanda Anderson
- Daria Massey as Lita Owens
- Ken Plumb
- Robin League
- Beverly Franklin
- Charles Leffler
- Don Hinkle
- Bob Head
- Curtis Workman
- Judi Vogelsang
- Anton von Stralen
- Caroline Walz

== Soundtrack ==
- Reggie Perkins – "High School Caesar" (Music and lyrics by John Neel and Oscar Nichols)
- Johnny Faire – "I Fell For Your Line, Baby"
- Reggie Olson – "Lookin' Waitin' Searchin' Hopin'"

== Reception ==
Diabolique magazine wrote that "Ashley is excellent as a poor little rich kid who tyrannizes his high school; it’s a real star vehicle for him – he gets to be mean, charismatic, and cry into his pillow – and it’s easily one of his best performances; unfortunately, the movie... came at the tail end of the juvenile delinquent cycle and was not that successful."
