= Daria Massey =

American actress

- Occupation: Actress
- Years active: 1950–1963
- Spouse: David F. Joesting (m. 1961; div. 1962) David N. Caerr (m. 1956; div. 1958)

Daria Massey is an American actress who appeared in films and television shows of the 1950s and 1960s, including Sabu and the Magic Ring, High School Caesar , The Islanders and The Ladies Man. Her roles include a number of Asian, Hispanic and Native American female characters.

== Early life and career ==
Massey is of multiracial background. European and Asian. (Another sources says, more specifically, "of Irish and Chinese extraction".) After having been a child actress for Warner Bros. she went back to that studio in 1959 to portray "a full-grown gypsy girl" in The Miracle.

In 1957 she played the lead role of Zumila alongside actor Sabu in Sabu and the Magic Ring. In 1960 she had the role of Lomita Stevens in High School Caesar, her appearance in this film being described by Jeffery Dennis as "creepy, semi-comatose" and "look[ing[ like Vampirella without the cleavage". Other feature films in which she played include The Miracle of Our Lady of Fatima (1952), The Iron Mistress (1952) and The Ladies Man (1961) as Miss Tickey. She also played in various TV shows, such as The Islanders, in which she had the role of a "a luscious belly-wiggling Javanese", Death Valley Days, The Stu Erwin Show, West Point, Wagon Train, Follow the Sun, McHale's Navy.

== Personal life ==
Massey was married to David N. Carr, an oil company executive from 1956 until their divorce in 1958, and then to stage manager David F. Joesting from 1961 to 1962.

== Filmography ==
Movies and TV Show
Year	Title	Role	Note
1963	McHale's Navy	Lalanai	1 episode
1961	Follow the Sun	Young Amanda	2 episodes
1961	The Ladies Man	Miss Tickey	
1961	The Islanders	Naja	5 episodes
1960	Adventures in Paradise	Ami	1 episode
1960	High School Caesar	Lita Owens	
1960	Hong Kong	Suzie	2 episodes
1960	The Tall Man	Maria Perez	1 episode: "The Shawl"
1960	Sea Hunt	Susie Turner	1 episode
1959	The Miracle	Gata	
1959	Colt. 45	Ynez	1 episode
1959	Wagon Train	Melanie Pumpret	1 episode
1959	Playhouse 90	Rosita	1 episode
1959	Steve Canyon	Vreshta Brahma	1 episode
1959	Cimarron City	Nooma	1 episode
1959	26 Men	Wanama Harrison	1 episode
1959	Sky King	June Martin	1 episode
1958	The Restless Gun	Running Fawn	1 episode: "Bonner's Squaw"
1957	Sabu and the Magic Ring	Zumila	lead role
1957	West Point	Allen's Date	1 episode
1957	The Evil One	Nooma	
1957	The Rosebush of Tombstone		
1957	The Man Who Was Never Licked		
1954	The Stu Erwin Show	Susie	1 episode
1954	Four Star Theatre	Joan	1 episode
1952	The Iron Mistress	Teresa Varamend	uncredited
1952	The Miracle of Our Lady of Fatima	Manuelita	uncredited
1952	Carrie	Carrie's sister	uncredited
1951	Fireside Theatre		1 episode
1951	Girl Never Tell	Clara	uncredited
1950	Tea for Two	Girl	uncredited
