= We and Our Cadillac =

Studio album by Hep Stars
- Released: September 1965
- Recorded: February – August 1965
- Studios: Various studios around Stockholm, Sweden
- Genres: Rock; rhythm and blues; beat; garage rock; hard rock
- Length: 32:24
- Label: Olga Records
- Producers: Gert Palmcrantz; Anders Ericsson

Hep Stars chronology
We and Our Cadillac (1965)	Hep Stars on Stage (1965)

Singles from We and Our Cadillac
- 1. "Cadillac" Released: March 1965; 2. "Bald Headed Woman" Released: June 1965; 3. "No Response" Released: September 1965

Professional ratings
Review scores
Source	Rating
AllMusic	3/5 stars

We and Our Cadillac is the debut album by Swedish beat group Hep Stars, released in September 1965. It was highly anticipated by fans, and succeeded their earlier hit singles, which turned Hep Stars into one of Sweden's top acts. It appeared on shows such as Drop-In and having three songs on Kvällstoppen simultaneously, a feat never achieved before. In Sweden alone, the Hep Stars had accumulated an ever-growing female fanbase, just like the Beatles did with Beatlemania just two years prior.

The album contains Benny Andersson's first original composition, "No Response", which was written by him after the band was criticised by contemporary Swedish acts such as Tages for not being able to write original material. The song, clocking in at 1:37, it is the shortest track on the album. Despite this, It was issued as a single in September, and reached number 2 on Kvällstoppen shortly thereafter. However, in later interviews, Andersson has considered it imperfect and a "rush-job".

In contrast to their later works, guitarist Janne Frisk shares lead vocal duties with Svenne Hedlund on 4 of the album's 12 tracks. This is due to the fact that Frisk was the group's lead singer and guitarist up until Hedlund's invitation to the band in mid-1964. Tracks on the album includes a re-recorded version of their hit song "Cadillac", which would go on to be heavily associated with the group, and become one of their signature songs. It became the first album release on the label, and the majority of tracks were cut on a three-track recorder.

== Track information ==
Most of the songs on the album are covers of already existing songs. For example, "Cadillac", the lead single from the album, is a cover of the song "Brand New Cadillac" by Vince Taylor and his Playboys. The only original song on the album is the lead track of the second side, "No Response", which was written by Benny Andersson, which was also released as the third and final single to the album. In total, there were three singles released for the album: "Cadillac", released in March 1965, "Bald Headed Woman" (originally by the Kinks), released in June 1965, and "No Response", released in September 1965, the same month as the album.

In 1996, the album was reissued alongside their next studio album (called The Hep Stars) with 8 bonus tracks, all of the songs also being covers. The bonus tracks consist of the band's first four singles, released from 1964 to March 1965. Some of these songs, alongside songs from the main track listing appear on the band's next album, a live album, called Hep Stars on Stage, released in November 1965, just two months after We and Our Cadillac originally released.

== Track listing ==
Side one
No.	Title	Writer(s)	Lead vocals	Length
1.	"Cadillac"	Vince Taylor	Svenne Hedlund	2:42
2.	"Be My Baby"	Jeff Barry; Ellie Greenwich; Phil Spector	Janne Frisk	2:56
3.	"That's When Your Heartaches Begin"	Fred Fisher; William Raskin; Billy Hill	Hedlund	3:55
4.	"Send Me Some Lovin'"	John S. Marascalco; Leo Price	Frisk	2:53
5.	"Young and Beautiful"	Aaron Schroeder; Abner Silver	Hedlund	2:32
6.	"Rockin' Love"	Carl Mann	Hedlund	2:53
Total length:				17:51

Side two
No.	Title	Writer(s)	Lead vocals	Length
1.	"No Response"	Benny Andersson	Hedlund	1:37
2.	"I'll Never Quite Get Over You"	Chad Stuart; Jeremy Clyde	Hedlund	3:17
3.	"Sweet Little Sixteen"	Chuck Berry	Frisk	2:14
4.	"Oh! Carol"	Neil Sedaka; Howard Greenfield	Hedlund	2:15
5.	"Then She (He) Kissed Me"	Barry; Greenwich; Spector	Frisk	3:03
6.	"Bald Headed Woman"	Shel Talmy	Hedlund	2:07
Total length:				14:33

1996 Bonus tracks
No.	Title	Writer(s)	Original release	Length
1.	"Kana Kapila"	Guy Dovan; Jean Rolle	Single A-Side, 1964	1:40
2.	"I Got a Woman"	Ray Charles; Renald Richard	B-Side of 'Kana Kapila', 1964	2:04
3.	"A Tribute to Buddy Holly"	Geoff Goddard	Singe A-Side, 1965	2:50
4.	"Bird Dog"	Felice Bryant; Diadorius Boudleaux Bryant	B-Side of 'A Tribute to Buddy Holly', 1965	1:54
5.	"If You Need Me"	Robert Bateman; Wilson Pickett; Sonny Sanders	B-side of 'Summertime Blues', 1965	2:20
6.	"Summertime Blues"	Eddie Cochran; Jerry Capehart	Single A-Side, 1965	1:52
7.	"Farmer John"	Don "Sugarcane" Harris; Dewey Terry	Single A-Side, 1965	1:53
8.	"Donna"	Ritchie Valens	B-Side of 'Farmer John', 1965	2:51
Total length:				17:24

== Personnel ==
Hep Stars

- Svenne Hedlund – lead and backing vocals
- Janne Frisk – guitar, backing vocals, lead vocals on "Be My Baby", "Send Me Some Lovin'", "Sweet Little Sixteen" and "Then She (He) Kissed Me"
- Benny Andersson – piano, organ, backing vocals (except "Kana Kapila" and "I Got A Woman")
- Lennart Hegland – bass guitar, backing vocals
- Christer Petterson – drums, backing vocals, lead vocals on "Bird Dog"
- Hans Östlund – organ on "Kana Kapila" and "I Got A Woman"

Other personnel

- Lennart Fernholm – bass guitar
- Gert Palmcrantz – producer
- Anders Ericsson – producer
- Robert Meyer – photography
