= Cybernetic Dreams of Pi =

Studio album by The Slickee Boys
- Released: 1983
- Genre: Rock
- Length: 40:28 (CD 66:19)
- Label: Twin/Tone
- Producers: John Chumbris, The Slickee Boys

The Slickee Boys chronology
Separated Vegetables (1977)	Cybernetic Dreams of Pi (1983)	Uh Oh… No Breaks! (1985)

Alternative cover
- Line Records version

Professional ratings
Review scores
Source	Rating
Flex!	(Extremely favorable)
Trouser Press	(Favorable)

Cybernetic Dreams of Pi, released in 1983, is an album by The Slickee Boys. It was released on LP by the Minneapolis record label Twin/Tone (catalog number TTR 8337). Along with songs penned by the band, there are cover versions of songs by Hamilton Streetcar and the Status Quo. To support the album, the band shot music videos for "Life of the Party" and "When I Go to the Beach", the latter video receiving semi-regular airplay on MTV, thanks to a second-place finish on that channel's Basement Tapes show. A CD version with eight additional tracks was released 22 years later.

== Track listing ==
1. "Escalator 66" – 2:39 (Marshall Keith, Mark Noone)
2. "You've Got What It Takes" – 3:37 (Noone)
3. "Life of the Party" – 3:25 (Noone)
4. "When I Go to the Beach" – 2:42 (Noone)
5. "Pushin' My Luck" – 3:45 (Kim Kane, Keith, Noone)
6. "Invisible People" – 3:32 (Ralph Plummer)
  - Originally recorded by Hamilton Streetcar, 1968
7. "Nagasaki Neuter" – 3:16 (Keith, Kane)
8. "Say Goodbye" – 3:03 (Noone)
9. "Time Spent Waiting" – 3:06 (Keith, Noone)
10. "The Crawling Hand" – 2:45 (Keith)
11. "Pictures of Matchstick Men" – 2:41 (Francis Rossi)
12. "Marble Orchard" – 6:02 (Kane)
13. "Gotta Tell Me Why" – 4:22 (Noone) [CD bonus track]
14. "Glendora" – 2:39 (Ray Stanley) [CD bonus track]
  - Originally recorded by Perry Como, 1956
15. "Golden Love" – 3:48 (Kane) [CD bonus track]
16. "Forbidden Alliance" – 2:32 (Keith, Noone) [CD bonus track]
17. "A Question of Temperature" – 3:31 (Mike Appel, Ed Schnug, Don Henny) [CD bonus track]
  - Originally recorded by the Balloon Farm, 1967
18. "Reverse Psychiatry" – 4:03 (Noone, Keith, Emery Olexa) [CD bonus track]
19. "Without a Word of Warning" – 2:22 (Snuff Garrett, Leon Russell, Gary Lewis) [CD bonus track]
  - Originally recorded by Gary Lewis & the Playboys, 1965
20. "(I'm) Misunderstood" – 2:34 (Ed Kuepper, Chris Bailey) [CD bonus track]
  - Originally recorded by the Saints, 1978

== Personnel ==
=== The band ===
- Mark Noone – Lead vocals
- Marshall Keith – Lead guitar, keyboards, back-up vocals
- Kim Kane – Rhythm guitar, organ
- Dan Palenski – Drums, back-up vocals
- John Chumbris – Bass guitar
- Emery Olexa – Bass guitar ("Escalator 66", "Life of the Party", "When I Go to the Beach", "Pushin' My Luck", "Invisible People", "The Crawling Hand")

=== Production ===
- John Chumbris – Producer
- The Slickee Boys – Producer
- Don Zientara — Engineer

== Additional credits ==
- Recorded at Inner Ear Studio, Arlington, Virginia
- Kim Kane – Cover art
- Tom Shea – Photos
- Dedicated to Richard Sobol
- Steve Carr – Digital remastering (for CD)
- Digitally remastered at Hit & Run Recordings

== Alternative versions ==
- The LP was also released by the German Line label (1000 copies on white vinyl with significantly different cover artwork, catalog number LILP 4.00094) and on New Rose, too (with the Twin/Tone cover art, catalog number ROSE 33).
- An expanded CD version was released on Dacoit in 2005 (catalog number 2005-3). The CD includes eight additional songs: all four songs from 1979's 3rd EP ("Gotta Tell Me Why", "Glendora", "Golden Love", "Forbidden Alliance") plus four songs "found in the trunk of Kim Kane's orange Fury" ("A Question of Temperature", "Reverse Psychiatry", "Without a Word of Warning", "(I'm) Misunderstood"). The cover art was slightly altered.

== Sales ==
The Twin/Tone pressing of the LP sold 6738 copies.

== Sources ==
- LP, CD and cassette liner notes
- ASCAP Ace
- BMI Repertoire
