= Live at Last (The Slickee Boys album) =

Live album by The Slickee Boys
- Released: 1989
- Recorded: May 21, 1988
- Genre: Rock
- Length: 56:18
- Label: Giant
- Producer: The Slickee Boys

Professional ratings
Review scores
Source	Rating
Allmusic	link
Flex!	(Favorable) link
Trouser Press	(Mixed) link

Live at Last is a live album by The Slickee Boys. It was released in April 1989 on the New Rose label (ROSE 169) on LP and CD; in the US it came out on Giant (on LP and cassette, catalog number GRI6037). Coinciding with the release of their album Fashionably Late, in May 1988 the band embarked on a brief tour of Europe. Live at Last is a document of one night on that tour, at Ubu in Rennes, France. The CD version of this album contain two extra tracks, "Your Autumn Eyes" and "(Are You Gonna Be There at The) Love-In". They perform songs from all but the earliest part of their (at that point) twelve-year career, including the band's last original song (which had not been released at the time of the show), "This Party Sucks". Cover versions include songs originally by the French punk band the Dogs, the Status Quo, the Afrika Korps, and The Chocolate Watch Band. Not long after their European tour, founding member Kim Kane departed to focus on his other band, Date Bait. He was replaced by long-time roadie/sound guy/guest vocalist John Hanson until the band's farewell show in December 1990.

== Track listing ==
1. "Gotta Tell Me Why" – 4:05 (Mark Noone)
2. "Dream Lovers" – 4:02 (John Chumbris, Noone, Dan Palenski)
3. "Missing Part" – 3:02 (Chumbris)
4. "Sleepless Nights" – 2:19 (Chumbris, Noone)
5. "Disconnected" – 3:30 (Chumbris, Noone)
6. "Dropping Off to Sleep" – 4:00 (Noone)
7. "The Brain That Refused to Die" – 4:13 (The Slickee Boys)
8. "Death Lane" – 2:10 (Dominique Laboubée)
  - Originally recorded by the Dogs, 1982
9. "Life of the Party" – 3:15 (Noone)
10. "Pictures of Matchstick Men" – 3:08 (Francis Rossi)
  - Originally recorded by the Status Quo, 1968
11. "When I Go to the Beach" – 2:30 (Noone)
12. "Jailbait Janet" – 2:15 (Kenne Highland, Noone)
  - Originally recorded by the Afrika Korps, 1977
13. "This Party Sucks" – 3:50 (Noone)
14. "Here to Stay" – 4:01 (Noone)
15. "Your Autumn Eyes" – 5:15 (Kim Kane, Marshall Keith, Noone)
16. "(Are You Gonna Be There at The) Love In" – 7:10 (Ethon McElroy, Donald Bennett)
  - Originally recorded by The Chocolate Watch Band, 1967

== Personnel ==
=== The Slickee Boys ===
- Mark Noone – lead vocals
- Marshall Keith – lead guitar, backing vocals
- Kim Kane – rhythm guitar, backing vocals
- Mike Maxwell – bass, backing vocals
- Giles Cook – drums, backing vocals

=== Production ===
- Alain "Hot Bread" Painchaud – Engineer
- Chris Mix – Sound engineer
- John Hanson – Live sound engineer
- Steve Carr – Remix engineer

=== Additional credits ===
- Recorded live at Ubu, Rennes, France
- Remixed at Hit + Run Studios, Rockville, Maryland
- Alain Duplantier – Photos
- Phillipe Huart – Sleeve design
- Pearl Cholley – Sleeve design
- "Special thanks to Jean-Louis Broussard and everyone at the Ubu. If you tour France, make sure you play there!"

== Alternative version ==
In 2006, Last Call Records (run by one of the two founders of New Rose) released a double CD of Live at Last and Fashionably Late. It had new cover art but no added material.

== Sources ==
- CD and LP liner notes
- ASCAP Ace
