= Fashionably Late (The Slickee Boys album) =

Studio album by The Slickee Boys
- Released: 1988
- Genre: Rock
- Length: 45:00
- Label: New Rose
- Producer: The Slickee Boys

The Slickee Boys chronology
Uh Oh… No Breaks! (1985)	Fashionably Late (1988)

Professional ratings
Review scores
Source	Rating
Melody Maker	(Mixed) May 28, 1988
Option	(Favorable)

Washington D.C.'s Slickee Boys' fourth and final "proper" album (not including compilations or live releases), Fashionably Late was released (on LP and CD) in early 1988 by the French New Rose label. That summer, they toured Europe (documented on their Live at Last album); soon afterwards, founding member Kim Kane departed to focus on his newer band, Date Bait. After a few more years of live shows, the Slickee Boys called it quits (reunion shows have taken place more or less annually since the early 1990s).

The song "Your Autumn Eyes", which was released as a single during the summer of 1987 (the same version which appears on the album), was quite a departure for the band—a melancholy waltz-time ballad with an intense bridge/guitar solo. Most of the rest of the album, however, was what fans had come to expect from the band.

Along with original songs written by members of the band, there are two cover songs: "You Can Run" was originally released by D.C.'s (The) Razz, and "The Mean Screen" was by the Gizmos (long-time friends of the Slickee Boys).

The compact disc version includes as bonus tracks both songs from the b-side of the "Your Autumn Eyes" 7"—an original, "Eye to Eye" and a cover of Gary Lewis and the Playboys' "Without a Word of Warning".

== Track listing ==
1. "Sleepless Nights" – 2:21 (John Chumbris)
2. "Hesitation" – 3:25 (Chumbris, Mark Noone)
3. "The Missing Part" – 2:32 (Chumbris)
4. "You Can Run" – 3:30 (Tommy Keene, Michael Reidy)
5. "Blind Deaf & Dumb" – 2:50 (Marshall Keith)
6. "The Mean Screen" – 1:57 (Scott Duhamel, Eddie Flowers, Kenne Highland)
7. "Your Autumn Eyes" – 4:55 (Kim Kane, Keith, Noone)
8. "Droppin' Off to Sleep" – 4:28 (Noone)
9. "The Dive" – 4:45 (Noone)
10. "If I Could Lie" – 4:27 (Keith, Noone)
11. "Love Twilight" – 3:33 (Kane, Keith)
12. "Eye to Eye" – 3:39 (Noone)
13. "Without a Word of Warning" – 2:20 (Snuff Garrett, Leon Russell, Gary Lewis)

== Personnel ==
=== The band ===
- Mark Noone — lead vocals
- Marshall Keith — lead and acoustic guitars; keyboards on "Hesitation", backing vocals and Marvox on "Your Autumn Eyes"
- Kim Kane — rhythm guitar, kimaphone, noises; lead vocals on "Love Twilight"
- John Chumbris — bass guitar; additional guitars on "Sleepless Nights", "The Missing Part" and "Hesitation"; backing vocals and keyboards on "The Missing Part", "Your Autumn Eyes" and "Love Twilight"
- Dan Palenski — drums, backing vocals; tambourine on "Love Twilight"
- Giles Cook — drums

=== Production ===
- Steve Carr — Engineer ("Hesitation", "Blind Deaf & Dumb", "Droppin' Off to Sleep", "Love Twilight")
- John Chumbris — Engineer ("You Can Run", "The Mean Screen", "Your Autumn Eyes", "If I Could Lie"), mixing ("Hesitation", "You Can Run", "Blind Deaf & Dumb", "The Mean Screen", "Your Autumn Eyes", "Droppin' Off to Sleep", "If I Could Lie")
- Mark Noone — Mixing ("Love Twilight")
- Don Zientara — Engineer ("Sleepless Nights", "The Missing Part", "The Dive")
- Giles Cook — Mixing ("Sleepless Nights", "The Missing Part", "The Dive")

== Additional credits ==
- Recorded at Inner Ear Studios, Arlington, Virginia and Hit & Run Studios, Rockville, Maryland
- Kim Kane — Drawings
- Eileen McNalley — Photo of fan
- Huart/Cholley — Sleeve design

== Errata ==
On both the LP and CD (though not on the LP labels) the track listing is incorrect: the second and third tracks are reversed. The correct order is shown above.

== Alternative version ==
In 2006, Last Call Records (run by one of the two founders of New Rose) released a double CD of Fashionably Late and Live at Last. It had new cover art but no added material.

== Sources ==
- LP and CD liner notes
- "Your Autumn Eyes" 7" sleeve notes
- BMI Repertoire
