= The Islanders (TV series) =

American TV adventure series (1960–1961)

- Created by: Richard L. Bare
- Starring: William Reynolds; James Philbrook; Diane Brewster
- Country of origin: United States
- Original language: English
- No. of seasons: 1
- No. of episodes: 24

Production
- Running time: approx. 50 minutes
- Production company: Metro-Goldwyn-Mayer Television

Original release
- Network: ABC
- Release: October 2, 1960 – March 26, 1961

The Islanders is an American adventure drama series that aired on ABC from October 2, 1960, to March 26, 1961, starring William Reynolds, James Philbrook, and Diane Brewster.

== Premise ==
Stated a UPI article on September 20, 1960, "Basis of the show is a one-airplane airline run by the three principals in the lush East Indies. The men are soldiers of fortune and Diane [Brewster] plays a Dutch girl attempting to regain her family’s property."

At the beginning of the series, Sandy Wade (Reynolds) and Zack Malloy (Philbrook), co-owners of a Grumman Goose amphibious aircraft, start their one-plane airline in the Moluccas or Spice Islands of the southwest Pacific Ocean. Throughout the series they experience a variety of adventures where seemingly harmless charter flights put them into danger. They are frequently aided in their endeavours by the unusually-named Wilhelmina "Steamboat Willy" Vanderveer (Brewster) and Shipwreck Callighan (Roy Wright).

"The boys get into lots of messes," said Brewster "and things aren't helped for them by the way I play one of them against the other in whatever romantic notions they have about me."

== Cast ==
- William Reynolds as Sandy Wade
- James Philbrook as Zack Malloy
- Diane Brewster as Wilhelmina "Steamboat Willy" Vanderveer
- Daria Massey as Naja
- Roy Wright as Shipwreck Callahan

== Episodes ==
No.	Title	Directed by	Written by	Original release date
1	"Five O'Clock Friday"	Richard L. Bare	Story by : Richard L. Bare; Teleplay by : Arnold Belgard & Richard L. Bare	October 2, 1960
2	"Flight From Terror"	Unknown	Unknown	October 9, 1960
3	"The Terrified Blonde"	Unknown	Unknown	October 16, 1960
4	"Talent for Danger"	Unknown	Unknown	October 23, 1960
5	"Operation Dollar Sign"	Unknown	Unknown	October 30, 1960
6	"Hostage Island"	Unknown	Unknown	November 6, 1960
7	"The Phantom Captain"	Unknown	Unknown	November 13, 1960
8	"Our Girl in Saigon"	Unknown	Unknown	November 20, 1960
9	"Forbidden Cargo"	Unknown	Unknown	November 27, 1960
10	"The Cold War of Adam Smith"	Unknown	Unknown	December 4, 1960
11	"Deadly Tomorrow"	Unknown	Unknown	December 11, 1960
12	"The Widow from Richmond"	Unknown	Unknown	December 18, 1960
13	"Duel of Strangers"	Unknown	Unknown	December 25, 1960
14	"The Twenty-Six Paper"	Charles Haas	Unknown	January 8, 1961
15	"The Generous Politician"	Stuart Heisler	Unknown	January 15, 1961
16	"Escape from Kaledau"	Roger Kay	Unknown	January 29, 1961
17	"To Bell the Cat"	Abner Biberman	Story by : Oliver Crawford & Paul Blackman; Teleplay by : Oliver Crawford	February 5, 1961
18	"Willy's Millionaire"	Hollingsworth Morse	Unknown	February 12, 1961
19	"The Strange Courtship of Danny Koo"	Harmon Jones	Unknown	February 19, 1961
20	"Island Witness"	Harry Harris	Unknown	February 26, 1961
21	"A Rope for Charlie Munday"	Herman Hoffman	Unknown	March 5, 1961
22	"The Lacosta Vendetta"	Herman Hoffman	Unknown	March 12, 1961
23	"The Pearls of Ratu"	Lewis Foster	Unknown	March 19, 1961
24	"The World is Her Oyster"	Unknown	Unknown	March 26, 1961

== Filming ==
William Reynolds stated in an interview, "The series went from being sort of like a Terry and the Pirates or a Maverick type of concept to becoming just a bunch of people skulking around. It wasn't very good."

"We have a show that has all the meat and potatoes," said Reynolds during filming. "All it lacks is the gravy... we may be trying to place too much in a small screen."

=== Accident ===
In February 1960 a plane carrying five crew members from Montego Bay to Miami crashed off the coast of Jamaica into the water. The men were Reynolds, Bare, Glenn Kirkpatrick, pilot Howard Smith and camera man George Schmidt. All but Schmidt were picked out of the water.

== Broadcast ==
The Islanders, primarily sponsored by Liggett & Myers' Chesterfield cigarettes, aired at 9:30 Eastern time on Sunday evenings opposite The Jack Benny Program and Candid Camera on CBS and on NBC against the second half of The Dinah Shore Show and The Loretta Young Show (its final season).

=== Reception ===
The Los Angeles Times said the show was like many other adventure series on ABC at the time (Hong Kong, Surfside 6, Hawaiian Eye) and said "it did achieve a certain flavour with its tropical background" adding "if the series scores at all - and it does show some promise - it will largely be due to Reynolds."

== Guest stars ==
- Aki Aleong
- Anna-Lisa
- Charles Bickford
- Charles Bronson
- Walter Burke
- Sebastian Cabot
- Anthony Caruso
- Hans Conried
- Elisha Cook, Jr.
- Norma Crane
- Christopher Dark
- Frank DeKova
- Peter Falk
- Betty Garde
- Myron Healey
- James Hong
- Robin Hughes
- Sam Jaffe
- Werner Klemperer
- Martin Landau
- Suzanne Lloyd
- George Macready
- E.G. Marshall
- Murray Matheson
- Nobu McCarthy
- Sean McClory
- Darren McGavin
- Jan Merlin
- Leslie Nielsen
- Jay Novello
- Joan O'Brien
- J. Pat O'Malley
- Leo Penn
- Gigi Perreau
- Suzanne Pleshette
- Gena Rowlands
- Gia Scala
- Robert J. Stevenson
- Harold J. Stone
- George Takei
- Luther Adler
- Gloria Talbott
- Harry Townes
- Grace Lee Whitney
- Peter Whitney
- Adam Williams
- Fay Wray
- Keenan Wynn
