= Skip Groff =

American record producer and DJ (1948–2019)

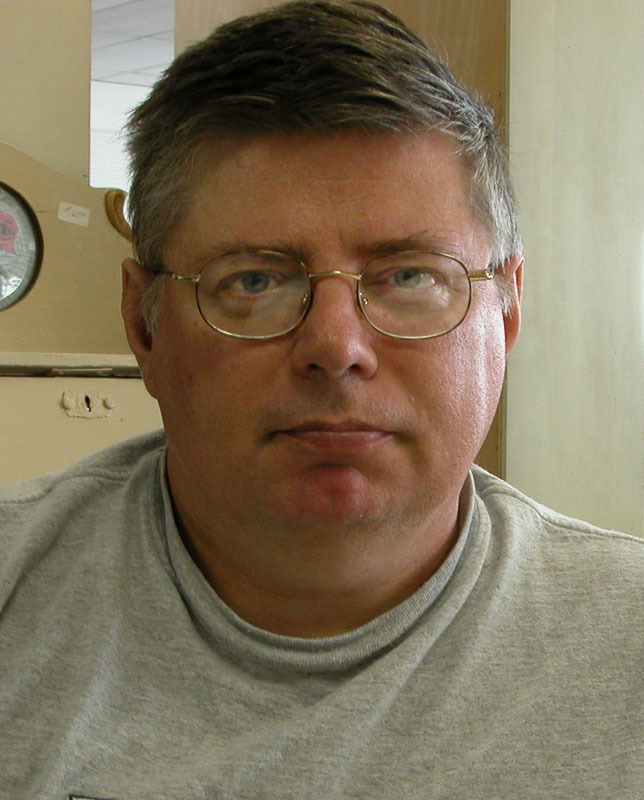
- Groff in 2004
- Born: November 20, 1948; Waltham, Massachusetts
- Died: February 18, 2019 (aged 70); Olney, Maryland
- Occupations: music producer, DJ, record store owner
- Known for: Yesterday and Today Records

Frank "Skip" Groff (November 20, 1948 – February 18, 2019) was an American record producer, disc jockey, and owner of Yesterday and Today record store (also known as Y&T) in Rockville, Maryland, at the center of much of Washington D.C.'s punk and alternative music scenes.

Groff was born in Waltham, Massachusetts and moved to Suitland, Maryland, as a child. He attended the University of Maryland and was a disc jockey at WMUC, the campus radio station.

Groff operated the independent record label Limp Records from 1978 to 1982. Called "a respected guru" of the DC punk and indie music scene, Groff was a radio DJ for WINX, WAVA, and WPGC, and did promotional work for RCA, before opening Yesterday and Today in September 1977. Groff was credited with helping Dischord Records get started, and his record store was an early retail outlet for their titles.

The store, which was named for the Beatles album Yesterday and Today, accumulated over a million 45s. It was frequently the site of record signings and performances by local and visiting bands (such as The Damned), and became a hangout for local musicians and music fans. Howard Wuelfing of the Slickee Boys, Nurses, and Half Japanese was the store's first employee. When the band Minor Threat broke up, its frontman Ian MacKaye worked at the store for five years. Other employees at Yesterday and Today included: Kim Kane of the Slickee Boys, Bert Queiroz and Danny Ingram of Youth Brigade, Brendan Canty and Guy Picciotto of Rites of Spring and Fugazi, Sharon Cheslow of Chalk Circle, Tommy Keene and Ted Niceley of The Razz, Shirley Sexton (later married to Stiff Little Fingers' Jake Burns), Amanda MacKaye who ran Slowdime Records, and Archie Moore and Jim Spellman of Velocity Girl. Groff met future wife and co-owner Kelly when she was a customer at Yesterday and Today, and their daughter Kirsty was named after British pop star Kirsty MacColl. The store closed in 2002.

Groff produced albums for many of the DC area's punk bands including the Slickee Boys, Razz, Bad Brains, Teen Idles, S.O.A., Dark, Nurses, Youth Brigade, Black Market Baby, Velvet Monkeys, and Minor Threat.

He died at Maryland's MedStar Montgomery Medical Center at the age of 70.
