= Sabu and the Magic Ring =

1957 film

- Film poster
- Directed by: George Blair
- Written by: Benedict Freedman; John Fenton Murray; Sam Roeca
- Produced by: Maurice Duke
- Starring: Sabu; William Marshall as the Genie; Daria Massey; John Doucette; Peter Mamakos; Vladimar Sokoloff
- Cinematography: Harry Neumann
- Edited by: William Austin
- Music by: Marlin Skiles
- Production company: Allied Artists Pictures Corporation
- Distributed by: Allied Artists Pictures Corporation
- Release date: November 24, 1957
- Running time: 61 minutes
- Country: United States
- Language: English

Sabu and the Magic Ring is a 1957 American adventure film directed by George Blair and starring Sabu, William Marshall, Daria Massey, John Doucette, Peter Mamakos and Vladimir Sokoloff. The film's sets were designed by the art director Dave Milton. It was originally conceived as a television series, but the project failed to gain a buyer and instead it was released as a feature film. It was produced and distributed by Allied Artists and was in the tradition of Arabian Nights films.

== Plot ==
Sabu, a stable boy in the Caliph's palace in Samarkand, discovers an old magic ring that grants wishes. In turn he tries to thwart a plot to overthrow and kill the Caliph.

== Cast ==
- Sabu as Sabu
- William Marshall as the Genie
- John Doucette as Kemal
- Peter Mamakos as Muzafar
- Vladimir Sokoloff as Fakir
- Daria Massey as Zumeela
- Robert Shafto as Caliph
- Bernard Rich as Ali
- Robin Morse as Yunan
- George Khoury as Phransigar
- Cyril Delevanti as Abdul
- Kenneth Terrell as Wazir's Guard (uncredited)

== Bibliography ==
- Craig, Rob. It Came from 1957: A Critical Guide to the Year's Science Fiction, Fantasy and Horror Films. McFarland, 2013.
- Von Gunden, Kenneth. Flights of Fancy: The Great Fantasy Films. McFarland, 2001.
