= Kim & The Cadillacs =

Italian rock band

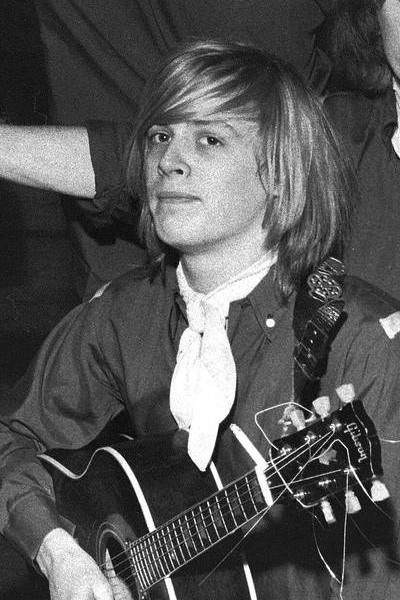
- Kim Brown of Kim & The Cadillacs

Background information
- Origin: Italy
- Genres: Pop; country; rock and roll
- Years active: 1977–1988
- Labels: Decca; DJM
- Past members: (see Personnel section)

Kim & The Cadillacs (also spelled "Kim and The Cadillacs") was a Milan-based English rock band, active from the late seventies until the late eighties. For the majority of their career they recorded with Alfredo Rossi's label Ariston Records.

== Career ==
Kim & The Caddilacs formed in 1977 in Milan and was founded by three former members of a disbanded group called The Renegades – Kim Brown, Graham Johnson and Mick Webley – and Trutz Groth. The band adopted a 1950s-styled classic rock'n'roll repertoire, inspired by the 1950s nostalgia craze that had already informed similar groups in North America as well as films like American Graffiti and Grease and TV shows like Happy Days in the 1970s.

After scoring a European hit with "Rock and Roll Medley", in 1979, Kim & The Cadillacs entered the main competition at the Sanremo Music Festival with the song "C'era un'atmosfera" (written by Aldo Stellita and Piero Cassano from Matia Bazar), finishing eighth.

Their main successes were the 1979/80 single "Stop", the 1981 single "Non Stop Twist" and the 1984 album Size 50, which respectively charted fifteenth, thirteenth and seventh on the Italian hit parade. The latter benefitted from the band's media exposure as regular musical guests in the comedy show Drive In. The band split in 1988 and Kim Brown moved to Finland. In 1996 he briefly reformed Kim & The Caddilacs with different musicians (Mick Brilli, Max Iannantuono, Guido Toffoletti, Dave sumner, George William Sims, Mike Logan and Paul Millns) and released the album "Memories Can Wait".

== Personnel ==
- Kim Brown - voice, bass guitar (1977-1988)
- Mick Webley - voice, lead guitar (1977-1988)
- Trutz "Viking" Groth - voice, guitar, harmonica (1977-1988)
- Ettore Vigo - electric piano (1978-1979)
- Charles Stuart - backing vocals (1978-1979)
- Tito Branca - saxophone (1978)
- Attilio Brianzi - saxophone (1977)
- Franco "Dede" Lo Previte - drums (1977-1981)
- Graham Johnson - producer

== Discography ==
Albums

- 1977: Rock'N'Roll (Ariston Records)
- 1978: Kim & The Cadillacs (Oxford Records)
- 1979: Rock 'N' Rollers (Ariston Records)
- 1980: Rock Bottom (Ariston Records)
- 1981: Cadillac's Corn (Ariston Records)
- 1982: Boogie (Ariston Records)
- 1982: Cadillacs' Eldorado Dance (Ariston Records)
- 1984: Size 50 (Ariston Records)
- 1985: On The Rocks (Ariston Records)
- 1986: 1986 (Fonit Cetra)
- 1996: Memories Can Wait (Gala Records)
