= Limp, South Carolina =

Unincorporated community in South Carolina, US

- Unincorporated community
- Location within South Carolina Location within the United States
- Coordinates: 33°59′17″N 81°51′08″W
- Country: United States
- State: South Carolina
- Counties: Saluda
- Time zone: UTC-5 (Eastern (EST))
  - Summer (DST): UTC-4 (EDT)

Limp is an unincorporated community in Saluda County, in the U.S. state of South Carolina.

== History ==
A post office called Limp was established in 1902, and remained in operation until being discontinued in 1916.
