= Limp Records =

- Founded: 1978
- Founder: Skip Groff
- Genre: Various
- Country of origin: U.S.
- Location: Rockville, Maryland

Limp Records was an independent record label in Rockville, Maryland, founded in 1978 and run by Skip Groff out of his Yesterday and Today Records store. Limp was one of the first labels releasing music from the nascent D.C. punk scene. The label's more notable output includes the first Bad Brains release (a song on The Best of Limp (…Rest of Limp)), the second Minor Threat record (a split release with Dischord), and the first record by Black Market Baby. The label's first release was the Slickee Boys second EP.

Much like Stiff Records had Devo's "Be Stiff," a song entitled "Stay Limp" by the Raisinets was included on Limp's :30 Over DC compilation.

== Slogans ==
On the :30 Over DC album, there are slogans next to the logos on each side of the record. Next to the square logo it says "Limp Records—our business is fitting squares onto round holes." Next to the round logo it says "Limp Records hang a round [sic] on spindles all day."

== Run-out groove messages ==
The following records have messages etched onto its run-out grooves:
LIMP 005 a-side: "Slickee delic." b-side: "We try to play it you try to like it"
LIMP 007 both sides: "It shoulda been mono"
LIMP 011 a-side: "Read Discords" b-side: "Still only 10¢"
LIMP 030 a-side: "This side's for Rusty" b-side: "This side's for Skip"
LIMP 035 a-side: "Remember Snitch" b-side: "Who's Snitch?"
LIMP 041 a-side: "Hi Henry. Hi Lyle. Never forget" b-side: "There's no place like home"
LIMP 1005 a-side: "You can't always get what you want, so send money!" b-side: "Six on one, half dozen on the other, plus two to go"
INT01 a-side: "Limp Records 'Ideologically sound'" b-side: "Limp Records 'Idea logically sound'"

== Discography ==
catalog #	artist	title/format	year	notes
EP1001	The Slickee Boys	Mersey, Mersey Me 7-inch EP	1978	
002	Tina Peel	More Than Just Good Looks 7-inch EP	1978	split release with Dacoit
003	Shirkers	"Drunk and Disorderly" 7-inch	1978	released with two different sleeves
005	The Slickee Boys	3rd EP 7-inch	1979	
007	D. Ceats	Monumental 7-inch EP	1979	blue vinyl
011	The Nurses	"Running Around" 7-inch	1981	
013	The Reind Dears	"Xmas (Is Going to Bring Me…)" 7-inch	1978	red vinyl
029	Nightman	"Don't You Know" 7-inch	1979	
030	(The) Razz	Airtime 7-inch EP	1979	split release with O'Rourke
031	(The) Razz	"You Can Run (But You Can't Hide)" 7-inch	1979	split release with O'Rourke
032	Killer Bees	Buzz'n the Town 7-inch	1979	
033	The Dark	The Dark 7-inch EP	1981	
034	The Nurses	"Hearts" 7-inch	1981	planned reissue that wasn't released
035	Black Market Baby	"Potential Suicide" 7-inch	1981	
041	Minor Threat	"In My Eyes" 7-inch	1981	red vinyl, black vinyl; split release with Dischord
INT01	Stiff All-Stars	"You Tell Me Lies" 7-inch	1981	sole release on Limp International
1001	various	:30 Over DC LP	1978	red vinyl, gold vinyl, black vinyl
1002	The Korps	Hello World LP	1979	blue vinyl
1003	The Slickee Boys	Separated Vegetables LP	1980	reissue of a 1977 release
1004	various	The Best of Limp (…Rest of Limp) LP	1980	
1005	various	Connected LP	1981	two different-colored covers
1006	Nightman	No Escape LP	1981	

== See also ==
- List of record labels
