= Kim Brown (musician) =

English musician (1945–2011)

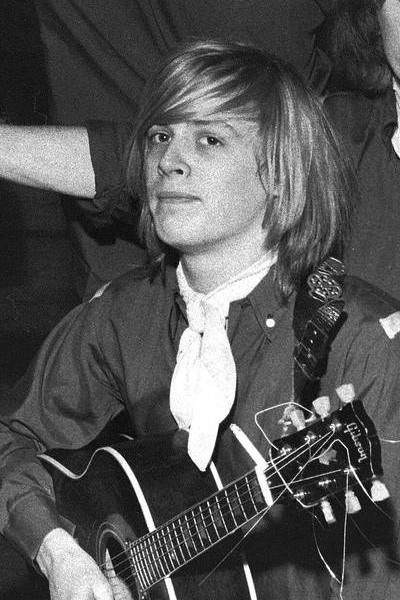
- Kim Brown in 1966 with the Renegades

Background information
- Born: 2 May 1945; Birmingham, England
- Died: 11 October 2011 (aged 66) Helsinki, Finland
- Occupation: Musician
- Instruments: Guitar, vocals

Kim Brown (2 May 1945 – 11 October 2011) was an English musician based in Finland and Italy, best known as the founder, lead singer and guitarist of the band The Renegades, which reached its greatest success during the 1960s.

== Life and career ==
Brown was born in Birmingham, England, but lived most of his life in Finland and Italy where he made a career in rock music. In later years, he played with such musicians as Hasse Walli and Markus Raivio. The Renegades recorded four albums in Finland. The tribute album, Moments with Kim Brown (2005), was made after Brown lost his voice due to cancer.

Brown co-wrote many of the #1 songs for The Renegades, played guitar and was the lead vocalist of the band. He moved to Italy in 1966 with The Renegades, and in 1977, he created a 1950s-style classic rock'n'roll combo called Kim & The Cadillacs, featuring German guitarist/singer Trutz 'Viking' Groth and former Renegade Mick Webley, as the craze - heralded by shows such as Happy Days and the movie Grease - took Europe by storm. Kim & The Cadillacs had regular chart success in Italy between 1977 and 1984, appearing often on national television shows including Drive In and Discoring as well as a 1979 appearance at the annual Festival di Sanremo. The group finally split up in 1988. Kim Brown then returned to Finland, though visiting Italy occasionally for guest appearances on 1960s revival TV shows and live gigs. The music of the Renegades was heavily featured in the 1994 Finnish film Take Care of Your Scarf, Tatiana directed by Aki Kaurismäki; this also included clips from some of their live performances from the 1960s.

Kim Brown died of esophageal cancer in Helsinki, Finland, aged 66, on 11 October 2011.

== Discography ==
=== The Renegades ===
The albums recorded in Finland.

- The Renegades (1965)
- The Renegades (1965)
- The Cadillac (1965)
- Take a Heart (1965)

=== Kim & The Cadillacs ===
- Rock'N'Roll (1977)
- Kim & The Cadillacs (1978)
- On The Rocks (1978)
- Rock Bottom (1980)
- Cadillac's Corn (1981)
- Boogie (1982)
- Cadillacs Eldorado Dance (1982)
- Size 50 (1984)
- On The Rocks (1985)
- 1986 (1986)
