= The Squires (Connecticut band) =

American garage rock band

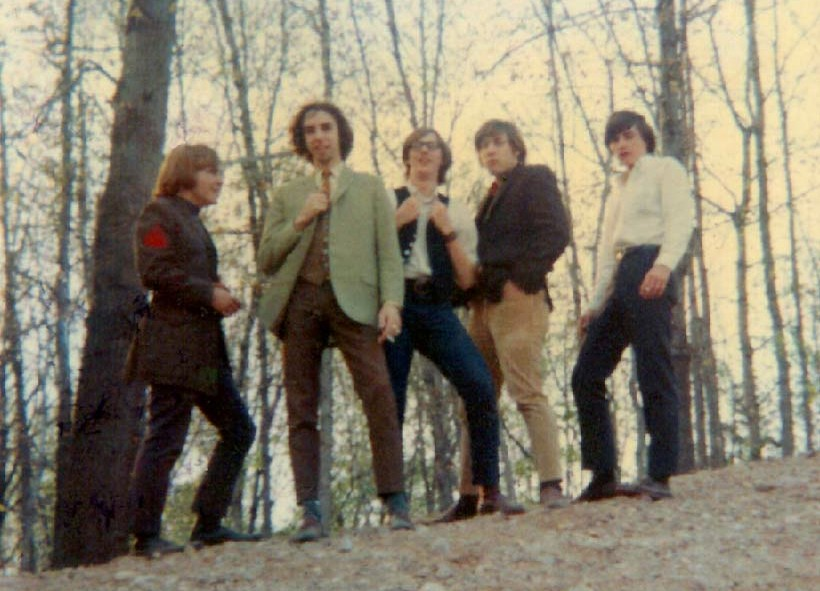
- The Squires

Background information
- Origin: Bristol, Connecticut, US
- Genres: Garage rock, psychedelic rock
- Years active: 1965–1967
- Labels: ATCO Records, Peyton Records, Crypt Records
- Past members: Michael Bouyea; Thomas Flanigan; Kurt Robinson; Jim Lynch; John Folcik; Brian Blake; Paul Shea

The Squires were an American garage band from Bristol, Connecticut, United States, operating in the 1960s.

They released just one single, which failed to be even a regional hit, but which is now regarded as a classic of its era. One critic wrote: "The yearning lyrics and melody, vibrant jangling guitars and brisk propulsive beat all combine to make The Squires' 'Going All the Way' a transcendent rock n roll record. That the song wasn't a huge hit and isn't heard daily on today's 'oldies' or 'classic rock' radio stations is shameful - but when it comes right down to it, it doesn't matter. The fact that 'Going All the Way' is little more than a secret, known only to a few thousand fanatics, only adds to its greatness. Success can be measured in terms other than units sold, and with "Going All the Way" The Squires succeeded in ways that much wealthier musicians failed".

== History ==
The band formed in Bristol, Connecticut, in 1965 and comprised high school friends Michael Bouyea (drums, guitar, vocals), Thomas Flanigan (lead guitar, vocals), Kurt Robinson (organ), Jim Lynch (rhythm guitar), and John Folcik (bass). They were originally known as "the Rogues", who released one single, "It's the Same All Over" on the local Peyton label, and started to build a strong local following. Later Folcik and Robinson were replaced by Brian Blake (bass and vocals) and Paul Shea (organ and vocals)

In April 1966, they drove to New York City and booked time at Capitol's studios, their main aim being to re-record their first single, but also recording several more songs at the same time, including Bouyea's "Going All the Way". Atco Records liked their material, but insisted on a name change to "the Squires", and "Going All the Way" was released in September 1966. Although it gave the band a higher profile in their home state, it met with no success elsewhere, the record company did not issue any follow-up, and Folcik and Robinson left the band. Lead singer Mike Bouyea was drafted the following year and sent to Vietnam. The Squires slipped into obscurity. Bouyea later released several singles: "The Fury", "Lover Of The Night", and "I Can Wait". He later became a radio personality at 1050 CHUM, Toronto, and recorded a theme song for the Toronto Blue Jays under the name "Home Run". The track was called, "We Got the Blue Jays" and was released as either "The R.B.I. Single Version" or the "7th Inning Stretch Version".

"Going All the Way" was reissued on the first of the Pebbles compilations of garage tracks in 1979, and its B-side "Go Ahead" on Pebbles, Vol. 2. They have subsequently been included on compilations by Rhino Records and others. All the recorded Squires and Rogues tracks were issued together on a compilation album, Going All the Way With The Squires on Crypt Records in 1986.

Despite their short list of recorded titles, "Go Ahead" was covered by the short-lived New Zealand indie supergroup Pop Art Toasters on their eponymous 1994 EP.
