= Glendora (song) =

Single by Perry Como
- B-side: "More"
- Published: 1956
- Released: May 1956
- Recorded: May 8, 1956
- Genre: Traditional pop
- Length: 2:43
- Label: RCA Victor (20-6554)
- Songwriter: Ray Stanley

Perry Como singles chronology
"More" (1956)	"Glendora" (1956)	"Somebody Up There Likes Me" (1956)

"Glendora" is a popular song written by Ray Stanley and published in 1956, originally performed by Jack Lewis with Zippy Simms Orchestra.

== Background ==
The song deals with a man's unusual attraction to a department store mannequin, and his disillusionment when, at the end of the song, he happens to see it disassembled during the store's renovation. It was recorded on May 8, 1956, by Perry Como. It was released by RCA Victor in the United States (catalog number 20-6554 on 78 rpm, 47-6554 on 45 rpm) and by RCA in France (catalog number 45-326); it was released in the United Kingdom by His Master's Voice (catalog number POP-240).

The flip side of the US and UK releases is "More." The French release's flip side is "Mandolins in the Moonlight." The song reached number eight on the US chart and number 18 on the UK Singles Chart.

"Glendora" was re-released by RCA Victor as a single in the "Gold Standard" series (catalog numbers 420-0817 and 447-0817), backed with "More." It has been included on albums Como-Tion (an extended play album released in 1960) and Love Makes the World Go 'Round (an LP released in 1964).

== Cover versions ==
- The song was later recorded by Billy Young in 1963,
- The Downliners Sect in 1966
- Los Speakers in 1966
- Sole System
- The Slickee Boys in 1979.
- The Chinese Millionaires in 1997.
- In Finland the song has been recorded by Olavi Virta ("Glendora"), Brita Koivunen ("Ikkunaprinssi"), Rauli Badding Somerjoki ("Ikkunaprinsessa") and Ville Valo & Agents ("Ikkunaprinsessa, 2019").

== Popular culture ==
- The song is repeatedly mentioned in Nikos Nikolaidis' Greek film The Wretches Are Still Singing (Ta kourelia tragoudane akoma) filmed in 1979. More specifically, one of the lead characters mentions at the start of the film that "Well, do you know when everything got screwed up?", proceeding to answer his own question with "when that cretin Perry Como sang Glendora". However, at the end of the film another leading actor admits that it was not Perry Como's fault by saying that "It was one of Konstantinos' jokes to cover things up".
