= The Slickee Boys =

Washington, D.C. area punk-psychedelic-garage rock band

- Origin: Washington, D.C., U.S.
- Genres: Punk rock, garage rock, psychedelic rock, new wave, rock
- Years active: 1976–1991
- Labels: Dacoit (US); Giant (US); Limp (US); Line (Germany); New Rose (France); Twin/Tone (US)

The Slickee Boys were a Washington, D.C.-area punk-psychedelic-garage rock band whose most-remembered lineup consisted of guitarist Marshall Keith, guitarist Kim Kane, singer Mark Noone and drummer Dan Palenski. The group was named after a GI slang term for the rockabilly-inspired Korean street toughs who sold black market goods to American soldiers.

== History ==
The band was founded in 1976 by guitarists Kim Kane and Marshall Keith, with Kane as principal songwriter, and featured Martha Hull on vocals. The band released its first EP, Hot and Cool, that same year. Separated Vegetables, the group's full-length debut, followed in 1977, but Kane disliked the album's sound to such a degree that he limited the initial pressing to 100 copies.

In 1978, Mark Noone replaced Hull as the singer, with the band reimagining itself through both Noone's showmanship and songwriting. In 1983, a music video for their song "When I Go to the Beach" placed second in MTV's Basement Tapes competition.

In 1988 after a short European Tour, founding member Kim Kane departed to focus on his band Date Bait. The band soldiered on with long-time roadie, John Hansen, taking over on rhythm guitar until they called it quits in 1991.

They hold the record for the most performances at 9:30 Club – 81 shows.

== Other work ==
In the mid 1980s, The Slickee Boys formed their alter ego rockabilly band, The Wanktones. At some venues, including the now-defunct DC club The Wax Museum, The Wanktones "opened" for The Slickee Boys. On their first album released as The Wanktones, "Have a Ball Y'all", the members are listed under the following pseudonyms: Del Marva, Bo Link, Mo Sloe, Ersel Wank, Floyd Glen Bernie, and Elmer Preslee. "Live At The Fontana Bowlarama" was the second album by Wanktones; released in 1999.

In 1977, four members of the Slickee Boys contributed to the debut album "Music to Kill By," by the Afrika Korps.

== Awards ==
They've won several "Wammie" awards from the Washington Area Music Association.

- 1985 – Record (Single/EP) of the Year, "When I Go to the Beach"
- 1985 – Video of the Year, "When I Go to the Beach"
- 1986 – Rock/Pop Artist/Group of the Year
- 2002 – Rock Recording of the Year, Somewhat of an Anthology

In 1989 the band was inducted into the WAMA Hall of Fame

== Reunion shows ==
Starting shortly after the break-up, reunion shows took place most years usually the week between Christmas and New Years, with one show each in Baltimore and D.C. Frequently the line-up changes during the course of the show, with band members taking turns playing on different songs. The Slickee Boys 50th Anniversary Party was held at the 9:30 Club on May 30, 2026 to a packed house.

December 2006; from left: Kim Kane, Mark Noone, Marshall Keith

== Members ==
- John Chumbris – Bass guitar
- Giles Cook – Drums
- John Hansen – Rhythm guitar
- Martha Hull – Lead vocals
- Kim Kane – Rhythm guitar
- Thomas Kane – Bass guitar
- Marshall Keith – Lead guitar, keyboards
- Mike Maxwell – Bass guitar
- Mark Noone – Lead vocals
- Emery Olexa – Bass guitar
- Dan Palenski – Drums
- Chris Rounds – Drums
- Andy von Brand – Bass guitar
- Howard Wuelfling – Bass guitar

== Discography ==
=== 7" vinyl ===
- Hot and Cool – EP, Dacoit, 1976
- Mersey, Mersey Me – EP, Limp, 1978
- 3rd EP – EP, Limp, 1979
- "The Brain That Refused to Die" – single, Dacoit, 1980
- "Here to Stay" – single, Dacoit, 1981
- "When I Go to the Beach" – single, Dacoit, 1983
- "When I Go to the Beach" – single, Twin/Tone, 1983
- "When I Go to the Beach" – single, New Rose, 1984
- "Your Autumn Eyes" – single, New Rose, 1987
- 10th Anniversary EP – EP, Dacoit/D.S.I., 1987
- "This Party Sucks" – single, New Rose, 1988
- "Long Way to Go" – single, Dacoit, 1995

=== Full-length albums ===
- Separated Vegetables, 1977
- Here to Stay, 1982
- Cybernetic Dreams of Pi, 1983
- Uh Oh… No Breaks!, 1985
- Fashionably Late, 1988
- Live at Last, 1989
- Somewhat of an Anthology, 2002
- A Postcard from the Day CD, 2006

=== Compilation albums ===
- 30 Seconds Over D.C. – LP, Limp, 1978 – Attitude
- The Best of Limp (…Rest of Limp) – LP, Limp, 1980
- Battle of the Garages – LP, Voxx, 1981
- Battle of the Garages – LP, Line, 1981
- Newlines Vol.2 – LP, Line, 1981
- Connected – LP, Limp, 1981 – Disconnected and Can't Believe
- Han-O-Disc – LP, D.I.Y., 1982
- The Rebel Kind – LP, Sounds Interesting (United States), 1983
- The Rebel Kind – LP, Lolita (France), 1983
- Hi-Muck – CS, 1983 – interview and Nagasaki Neuter (live)
- The Train to Disaster – LP, Bonafide, 1983
- The Train to Disaster – LP, L.S.D., 1983
- Midnight Christmas Mess Again – LP, Midnight, 1986
- Play New Rose for Me – 2xLP, New Rose, 1986
- Laserock'n'rollparty Vol.1 – CD, New Rose, 1987
- Every Day Is a Holly Day – 2x10", CD, New Rose, 1988
- Every Day Is a Holly Day – CD, Giant, 1988
- Laserock'n'rollparty Vol.2 – CD, New Rose, 1989
- New Rose Story – 4xCD, Last Call, 2000
- Stories of the Dogs – Songs for Dominique – 2xCD, Lollipop, 2006 – Death Lane
- Counter Culture 1976 – CD, Rough Trade, 2007 – Psychodaisies
- Vindicated! A Tribute to the Fleshtones – CD, Dirty Water Records/LP, Larsen, 2007

=== Other ===
- "Long Way to Go" – 6" flexidisc, Gorilla Beat, 1982

== In popular culture ==
In 1987 the film Back to the Beach used the song "When I Go to the Beach" during the bar scene with Bob Denver. It is not included in the soundtrack released on CBS Records.
