= Separated Vegetables =

Studio album by The Slickee Boys
- Released: 1977
- Recorded: 1976–1977
- Genre: Rock
- Label: Dacoit
- Producers: The Slickee Boys, Steve Lorber

The Slickee Boys chronology
Separated Vegetables (1977)	Cybernetic Dreams of Pi (1983)

Professional ratings
Review scores
Source	Rating
Flex!	Favorable link

Separated Vegetables is the first full-length album by Washington, D.C.'s Slickee Boys. Self-released on guitarist Kim Kane's Dacoit label (catalog number 1001), it was pressed in an edition of 100 copies. As well as songs written by the band, it includes cover versions of songs originally by Overkill (an early D.C. punk band, not the heavy metal band of the same name), Flamin' Groovies, the Road Runners, Johnny Smith, Country Joe and the Fish, the Small Faces, Chuck Berry, and the Hangmen (whose song, "What a Girl Can't Do", the Slickee's had already released on their debut record, 1976's Hot and Cool EP. A mix of studio and live recordings, the album includes a number of tracks taped in front of an appreciative audience at D.C. punk dive the Keg.

== Track listing ==
1. "Control" (Howard Wuelfing)
2. "Heart Murmur" (P. Austin, Xyra Harper)
  - Originally by D.C.'s Overkill
3. "Golden Love" (Kim Kane)
4. "Red Rocket Roll" (Kane, Marshall Keith, Martha Hull)
5. "Six Feet Under" (Keith, Hull)
6. "Just Blow Away" (Keith, Hull)
7. "Doctor Boogie" (Roy Loney, Cyril Jordan)
  - Originally recorded by Flamin' Groovies, 1971
8. "Road Runnah/Walk, Don't Run" (B. Buckles/Johnny Smith)
  - "Road Runnah" originally recorded by the Road Runners, 1963 (later credited to the Pyramids, 1964)
  - "Walk, Don't Run" originally recorded by Johnny Smith, 1954; also recorded by the Ventures, 1960
9. "Streets of Your Town" (Barry Melton)
  - Originally recorded by Country Joe and the Fish, 1968
10. "What Ya Gonna Do About It" (Ian Samwell, Brian Potter)
  - Originally recorded by the Small Faces, 1965
11. "No Money Down" (Chuck Berry)
  - Originally recorded by Chuck Berry, 1957
12. "Creep Skin" (Kane)
13. "What a Boy Can't Do '77" (Tom Guernsey)
  - Originally recorded by the Hangmen (as "What a Girl Can't Do"), 1966

== Personnel ==
=== The band ===
- Martha Hull — Vocals, special vocal arrangements
- Marshall Keith — Lead guitar, rhythm guitar, keyboards, back-up vocals
- Kim Kane — Rhythm guitar, lead guitar, back-up vocals
- Andy von Brand — Bass guitar
- Chris Rounds — Drums, back-up vocals, "ptish" effect
- Howard Wuelfing — Bass guitar ("Control")

=== Guest musicians ===
- Charles Eichert — Farfisa organ ("Road Runnah", "Heart Murmur", "Golden Love")

=== Production ===
- The Slickee Boys — Producer
- Steve Lorber — Producer ("Six Feet Under", "Just Blow Away")
- Don Zientara — Live remote
- 'Dave' — Special mastering

== Additional credits ==
- Recorded at Radio, Washington, D.C., October 1976
- Recorded at Underground Sound, Maryland, January 1977
- Recorded at the Keg, Glover Park, Washington, D.C., June 13, 1977 ("Streets of Your Town", "What Ya Gonna Do About It", "No Money Down", "Creep Skin", "What a Boy Can't Do '77")
- Recorded at Carl Sandburg Elementary, Rockville, Maryland, July 24, 1977
- Mark Farris — Cover photo
- Kim Kane — Art
- Dan Palenski — Graphics
- Ric Clark — Typography
- "Special thanks to… D. Zientara; '?Dave the Mysterian;' Our great sound men—Rocky Brown, Dave Weber, and Scott Breuhard; also all the New Wave D.J.s on WGTB including the 'Mystic Eyes' show; Thanks to the audial patience of Mr. & Mrs. Rounds; the great support of all the Fanzines including O-Rexstacy, Vintage Violence, The Boston Groupie News; also the D. Cene, Ken 'Gizmo' Highland, A-Korps, and all the great Slickee Delic Fans! A special welcome to Howard Wuelfing and Dan Palenski. Andy Chaneceo—thanks for sound work."

== Alternate versions ==
- Separated Vegetables was reissued in 1980 by Limp in a limited edition of 200 copies (each labeled "no. __ of 200") in a red—rather than black—sleeve.
- In the early 1980s, a bootleg LP of the original Dacoit version appeared with an added track—"Long Way to Go".
- A bootleg of the 1980s bootleg (with the extra song) was released as Los Angeles and Vicinity Vol.2 (66 Records, MP 1004). The sleeve says "300 copies", and it's pressed on red vinyl. (Volume 1 is a Barracudas live recording).
Limp reissue

Bootleg with extra track

Los Angeles and Vicinity Vol.2

== Sources ==
- LP liner notes
- BMI Repertoire
- Vision of the Summer—Gary Usher Story
