= Washington Area Music Association =

The Washington Area Music Association (WAMA) is a regional music industry not-for-profit organization based in Washington, D.C. WAMA's activity centers on highlighting the area's cultural contribution by assisting regional musicians with becoming recognized on a national scale.

The organization offers its members a variety of professional development services, including seminars, directories for networking, assistance with obtaining barcodes for recordings, and the production of live music events. WAMA also organized the Washington Area Music Awards (Wammies) (a regional music award), and released and promoted compilation recordings that featured songs from different member artists.

== Sources ==
- "WAMA Crosstown Jam" piece at The Washington Post's MP3 Site
- WAMA Website - no longer active
