= Date Bait =

- Directed by: O'Dale Ireland
- Written by: Ethelmae Wilson Page
- Based on: story by O'Dale Ireland; Ethelmae Wilson Page; Robert Slaven
- Produced by: George Caras (associate producer); Nicholas Carras (associate producer); O'Dale Ireland; George S. Reppas (executive producer)
- Starring: Gary Clarke
- Cinematography: Lawrence Raimond
- Edited by: Anthony DiMarco
- Music by: Nicholas Carras
- Distributed by: Filmgroup
- Release date: 1960
- Country: United States
- Language: English

Date Bait is a 1960 American film directed by O'Dale Ireland. Filmgroup released the film as a double feature with High School Caesar.

== Plot ==
This U.S. film is a teenage delinquent drama. Two confused teenagers are in love and want to get hitched, but their uptight parents refuse permission. The couple finds themselves on the sleazy side of town, where they are victimized by the new bride's ex-boyfriend and his psychotic drug-addicted brother. The teens must also contend with other assorted criminals, including drug dealers and mobsters.

== Cast ==
- Gary Clarke as Danny Logan
- Marlo Ryan as Sue Randall
- Dick Gering as Brad Martinelli
- Carol Dawne
- Jon Lindon
- Gabe Delutri
- Michael Bachus
- Mildred Miller
- Steve Ihnat
- Chad Williams
- Lemar Crast
- Rita Guinan
- Anton von Stralen
- Trep Howard
- Reggie Perkins as Title Song Singer (voice)
- Johnny Faire as Singer (voice)

== Soundtrack ==
- Reggie Perkins - "Date Bait Baby"
