= Downliners Sect =

English rock band

- Origin: Twickenham, London, England
- Genres: British rhythm and blues; freakbeat; garage rock
- Years active: 1963–1968; 1977–present
- Label: EMI Columbia
- Members: Keith Grant; John O'Leary; Mark Freeman
- Past members: Don Craine; Del Dwyer

Downliners Sect are an English R&B and blues-based rock band, formed in the 1960s beat boom era. Stylistically, they were similar to blues-based bands such as The Yardbirds, The Pretty Things and the Rolling Stones, playing basic R&B on their first album The Sect. Critic Richie Unterberger wrote: "The Sect didn't as much interpret the sound of Chess Records as attack it, with a finesse that made the Pretty Things seem positively suave in comparison."

== History ==
In 1962, Mick O'Donnell, later known as Don Craine, started a band called the Downliners, who, despite touring France, were unsuccessful. The name of the band came from the Jerry Lee Lewis B-side "Down The Line". After several lineup changes, the band folded, but in 1963, O'Donnell and drummer Johnny Sutton formed a new band out of the remnants of the previous act. Keith Evans, formerly a drummer, joined on bass guitar. Shortly thereafter the band would be named the Downliners Sect. At this time some of the members decided to change their names. Mick O'Donnell took the new name, Don Craine, and Keith Evans became Keith Grant.

The band was iconic during its time in the early 1960s, partly owing to Don Craine's deerstalker cap which he wore to mock the aristocracy. The band has many fans who have achieved commercial success, including Van Morrison, Steve Marriott, and Rod Stewart, the latter two had even auditioned for a place in the band but were turned down because they both wanted to be frontmen, while Don Craine and Keith Grant did not wish to relinquish that role.

They subsequently modified their musical style, and after an EP of 'sick' songs (e.g. "I Want My Baby Back"), they experimented with both country (The Country Sect) and rock (Rock Sect's In). They later collaborated with Billy Childish's Thee Headcoats, and released two albums under the name Thee Headcoats Sect. They performed regularly at the Studio 51 club in Great Newport Street near Leicester Square tube station in London on a Friday night and Sunday afternoon, from which came the first EP featuring the songs "Beautiful Delilah" and "Little Egypt". The EP started off with the sound of the bells of Big Ben. The lead guitarist was Terry Clemson (Gibson) who played his Gibson 335. Studio 51 was also known as the Ken Colyer Club and the Rolling Stones made many performances at this club.

A reformed line-up with three original members, Keith Grant, Don Craine and Terry Gibson, released a new album Showbiz in 1979. A subsequent reformation featuring Grant and Craine who were joined by guitarist Del Dwyer in 1989 released Savage Return in 1991, Dangerous Ground in 1998 and Chinese Whispers in 2007.

Don Craine (born Michael O'Donnell) died on 24 February 2022, at the age of 76.

== Members ==
Current members

- Keith Grant – vocals/bass
- Mark Freeman – drums

Past members

- John O'Leary – vocals/harp (died 3 April 2024)
- Don Craine – vocals/guitar (born 29 March 1945, died 24 February 2022)
- Del Dwyer – vocals/guitar (died 31 December 2021)
- Al Brooks – drums (died 4 January 2010)
- Barry Cooper – keyboards
- Rod de'Ath – drums (died 4 August 2014)
- Matt Fisher – keyboards
- Kevin Flanagan – drums
- Terry Clemson – lead guitar (died 19 September 2020)
- Pip Harvey – harmonica (died 14 February 2014)
- Paul Holm – drums
- Mel Lewis – lead guitar
- Nat Maynard – keyboard
- Ray Sone – harmonica
- John Sutton – drums
- Bob Taylor – lead guitar
- Paul Tiller – harmonica
- Zach Wilson – guitar
- Paul Martinez – vocals/bass
- Mike Chapman – vocals/guitar

== Discography ==
=== Singles ===
- Jun 1964 – "Baby What's Wrong" / "Be a Sect Maniac" (Columbia DB 7300)
- Sep 1964 – "Little Egypt (Ying-Yang)" / "Sect Appeal" (Columbia DB 7347)
- Nov 1964 – "Find Out What's Happening" / "Insecticide" (Columbia DB 7415)
- ??? 1965 – "Wreck of the Old '97" / "Leader of the Sect" (Columbia DB 7509)
- Jun 1965 – "I Got Mine" / "Waiting in Heaven Somewhere" (Columbia DB 7597)
- Oct 1965 – "Bad Storm Coming" / "Lonely and Blue" (Columbia DB 7712)
- Jan 1966 – "All Night Worker" / "He Was a Square" (Columbia DB 7817)
- Jun 1966 – "Glendora" / "I'll Find Out" (Columbia DB 7939)
- Sep 1966 – "The Cost of Living" / "Everything I've Got to Give" (Columbia DB 8008)

=== 7" EPs ===
- "Nite in Gt. Newport Street": Beautiful Delilah/Shame Shame Shame/Green Onions/Nursery Rhymes (Contrast RBCSP 001, 1964)
- "Brite Lites": Bright Lights Big City/I need you baby(mona)/Do the Dog/Roll Over Beethoven (Contrast RBCSP 002, 1964) :Unreleased, finished sleeves exist. Tapes lost in 1964, released in March 2011.
- "The Sect Sing Sick Songs" – I Want My Baby Back/Leader of the Sect/Midnight Hour/Now She's Dead (Columbia SEG 8438, 1965)

=== LPs ===
- The Sect (1964)
- The Country Sect (1965)
- The Rock Sect's In (1966)
- Showbiz (1979)
- Savage Return (1991)
- Dangerous Ground (1998)
- Chinese Whispers (2007)

==== The Sect (18 December 1964) ====
The Sect

Studio album by Downliner's Sect
- Released: 1964
- Genres: Rock, R&B
- Length: 32:29
- Label: Columbia Records

1. Hurt by Love
2. One Ugly Child
3. Lonely and Blue
4. Our Little Rendezvous
5. Guitar Boogie
6. Too Much Monkey Business
7. Sect Appeal
8. Baby What's on Your Mind?
9. Cops and Robbers
10. Easy Rider
11. Bloodhound
12. Bright Lights
13. I Wanna Put a Tiger in Your Tank
14. Be a Sect Maniac

Columbia 33SX 1658

==== The Country Sect (1965) ====
The Country Sect

Studio album by Downliners Sect
- Released: 1965
- Genres: Rock, R&B, Country
- Length: 32:32
- Label: Columbia Records

1. If I Could Just Go Back
2. Rocks in My Bed
3. Ballad of the Hounds
4. Little Play Soldiers
5. Hard Travellin'
6. Wait for the Light to Shine
7. I Got Mine
8. Waiting in Heaven
9. Above and Beyond
10. Bad Storm Coming
11. Midnight Special
12. Wolverton Mountain

Columbia 33SX 1745

==== The Rock Sect's In (April 1966) ====
The Rock Sect's In

Studio album by Downliners Sect
- Released: 1966
- Genres: Rock, R&B
- Length: 34:36
- Label: Columbia Records

1. Hang on Sloopy
2. Fortune Teller
3. Hey Hey Hey Hey
4. Everything I've Got to Give
5. Outside
6. I'm Hooked on You
7. Don't Lie to Me
8. Why Don't You Smile Now (Phillips, Vance, Reed, Cale)
9. May the Bird of Paradise Fly up Your Nose
10. He Was a Square
11. I'm Looking for a Woman
12. Rock Sect's in Again
13. Brand New Cadillac

Columbia 33SX 6028

==== The Definitive Downliners Sect: Singles – A's & B's (1994) ====
Definitive Downliners Sect

Compilation album by Downliners Sect
- Released: 1994
- Genres: Rock, R&B
- Label: See For Miles

1. Cadillac
2. Roll Over Beethoven
3. Beautiful Delilah
4. Shame, Shame, Shame
5. Green Onions
6. Nursery Rhymes
7. Baby What's Wrong
8. Be a Sect Maniac
9. Little Egypt (Ying-Yang)
10. Sect Appeal
11. Find Out What's Happening
12. Insecticide
13. Wreck of the Old '97
14. Leader of the Sect
15. I Want My Baby Back
16. Midnight Hour
17. Now She's Dead
18. I Got Mine
19. Waiting in Heaven Somewhere
20. Bad Storm Coming
21. Lonely and Blue
22. All Night Worker
23. He Was a Square
24. Glendora
25. I'll Find Out
26. Cost of Living
27. Everything I've Got to Give
28. I Can't Get Away from You
29. Roses

See For Miles SEECD398
