= List of number-one hits of 1977 (Mexico) =

This is a list of the songs that reached number one in Mexico in 1977, according to Billboard magazine with data provided by Radio Mil. Also included are the number-one songs according to the Record World magazine.

== Chart history (Billboard) ==
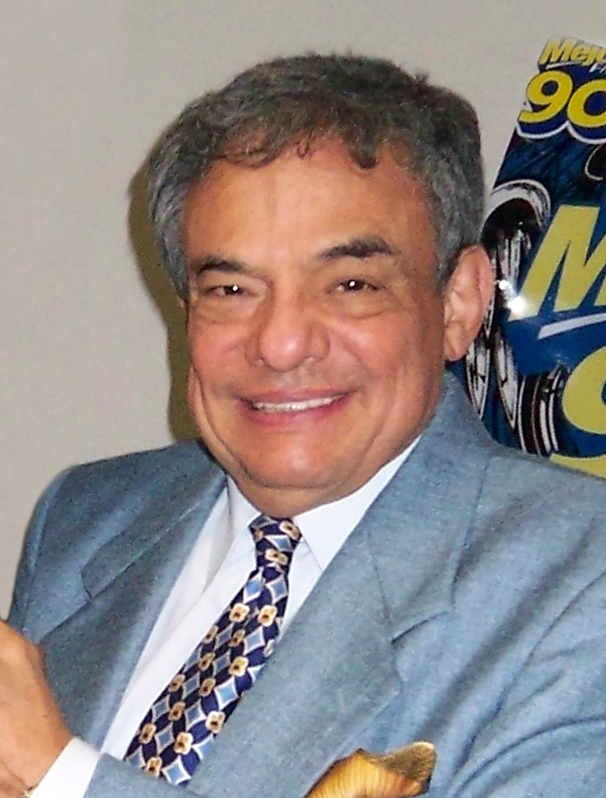
Mexican singer José José had his fourth number-one song, and his first under the Ariola label, with "Gavilán y paloma".

Issue date	Song	Artist(s)	Label	Ref.
January 14	"Llamarada"	Manolo Muñoz	GAS	
January 29	"Llamarada"	Manolo Muñoz	GAS	
February 4	"Llamarada"	Manolo Muñoz	GAS	
February 11	"Llamarada"	Manolo Muñoz	GAS	
April 23	"Un día con mamá"	Cepillín	Orfeón	
May 5	"Vive"	Napoleón	Raff	
May 20	"Siempre en mi mente"	Juan Gabriel	RCA	
June 3	"Siempre en mi mente"	Juan Gabriel	RCA	
June 10	"Siempre en mi mente"	Juan Gabriel	RCA	
June 24	"Siempre en mi mente"	Juan Gabriel	RCA	
July 15	"Siempre en mi mente"	Juan Gabriel	RCA	
July 29	"Gavilán o paloma"	José José	Ariola	
August 5	"Gavilán o paloma"	José José	Ariola	
August 22	"Gavilán o paloma"	José José	Ariola	
September 23	"Gavilán o paloma"	José José	Ariola	
September 30	"Gavilán o paloma"	José José	Ariola	
October 7	"Gavilán o paloma"	José José	Ariola	
November 4	"Hombre"	Napoleón	Raff	
November 11	"Hombre"	Napoleón	Raff	
November 18	"Hombre"	Napoleón	Raff	
November 25	"Hombre"	Napoleón	Raff	
December 9	"Tarde"	Rocío Dúrcal	Ariola	
December 16	"Ma Baker"	Boney M./Grupo El Tren	RCA / Orfeón	
December 22	"Ma Baker"	Boney M./Grupo El Tren	RCA / Orfeón	

== Chart history (Record World) ==
Issue date	Song	Artist(s)	Ref.
January 15	"Canción del Chapulín Colorado"	Chespirito	
January 29	"Canción del Chapulín Colorado"	Chespirito	
February 26	"Triángulo"	Los Baby's	
March 5	"Me quiero casar"	Rigo Tovar & el Conjunto Costa Azul	
May 21	"Vive"	Napoleón	
June 4	"Brindo por tu cumpleaños"	Aldo Monges	
August 20	"Gavilán o paloma"	José José	
August 27	"La tristeza de mi mujer"	Aldo Monges	
October 15	"Gavilán o paloma"	José José	
October 29	"Pajarillo"	Napoleón	
November 12	"Pajarillo"	Napoleón	
December 10	"Pajarillo"	Napoleón	
December 17	"Dos tardes de mi vida"	Rigo Tovar & el Conjunto Costa Azul	

== See also ==
- 1977 in music

== Sources ==
- Print editions of the Billboard magazine.
