= Little Joe Cook =

- Born: Joseph Cook; December 29, 1922; Philadelphia, Pennsylvania, U.S.
- Origin: South Philadelphia
- Died: April 15, 2014 (aged 91) Framingham, Massachusetts, U.S.
- Genres: Rhythm and blues
- Occupation: Singer-songwriter
- Years active: 1934–2007
- Labels: Apex, OKeh, Loma, 20th Century

Joseph Cook (December 29, 1922 – April 15, 2014), known as Little Joe Cook, was an American rhythm and blues singer and songwriter. He is best known as the lead singer of Little Joe & The Thrillers, whose song "Peanuts" reached No. 22 on the Billboard Top 100 and No. 4 in Canada in 1957.

== Life and career ==
He was born in South Philadelphia, and started singing in church. His mother, Annie Hall, was a locally well-known blues singer and his grandmother was a Baptist preacher. By the time he was 12, he and three cousins had formed a gospel vocal quartet, the Evening Stars, who had a one-hour weekly radio show in Philadelphia. Cook was noted for his falsetto singing as well as his personality, and first recorded in 1949. In 1951 the group recorded "Say A Prayer for the Boys In Korea" for Apex Records. He also worked in shipbuilding for the US Navy, and as a delivery driver.

In the early 1950s Cook decided to make the transition to secular rhythm and blues music, later declining an offer to join The Soul Stirrers after Sam Cooke left. He formed a new doo-wop vocal group, the Thrillers, with Farrie Hill (second lead), Richard Frazier (tenor), Donald Burnett (baritone), and Henry Pascal (bass). They won a contract with OKeh Records in 1956, and their first single, "Do the Slop", was a regional hit in Philadelphia and New York City. The song introduced a new dance craze, and the group performed at the Apollo Theater.

The group's second single, "Peanuts", was written by Cook and again featured his falsetto as the lead. Released in 1957, it won the group an appearance on American Bandstand, and rose to No. 22 on the national pop chart, though it failed to make the R&B chart. Cook's falsetto singing style was reportedly an influence on singers Frankie Valli, who recorded "Peanuts" with The Four Seasons, and on Lou Christie.

Later recordings by the group were less successful, though they continued to release singles on the OKeh label until 1961. After a brief stay with 20th Century Records, the group broke up. Cook began performing solo, and toured with B. B. King and Bobby "Blue" Bland. He also formed a group, The Sherrys, with his daughters, Delphine and Dinell Cook and their friends Charlotte Butler and Delores "Honey" Wylie. Their record "Pop Pop Pop-Pie" reached No. 25 on the R&B chart in 1962.

Cook moved to Boston in the late 1960s, and continued to perform in clubs. He had a residency at the Cantab Lounge in Cambridge, Massachusetts, from 1980 until he retired in 2007, being voted the region's Best Local R&B Performer in 2002.

Cook died of cancer on April 15, 2014, at the age of 91. He was survived by his wife Joanne and six children.
