= Svenne and Lotta =

Swedish pop duo

Svenne & Lotta
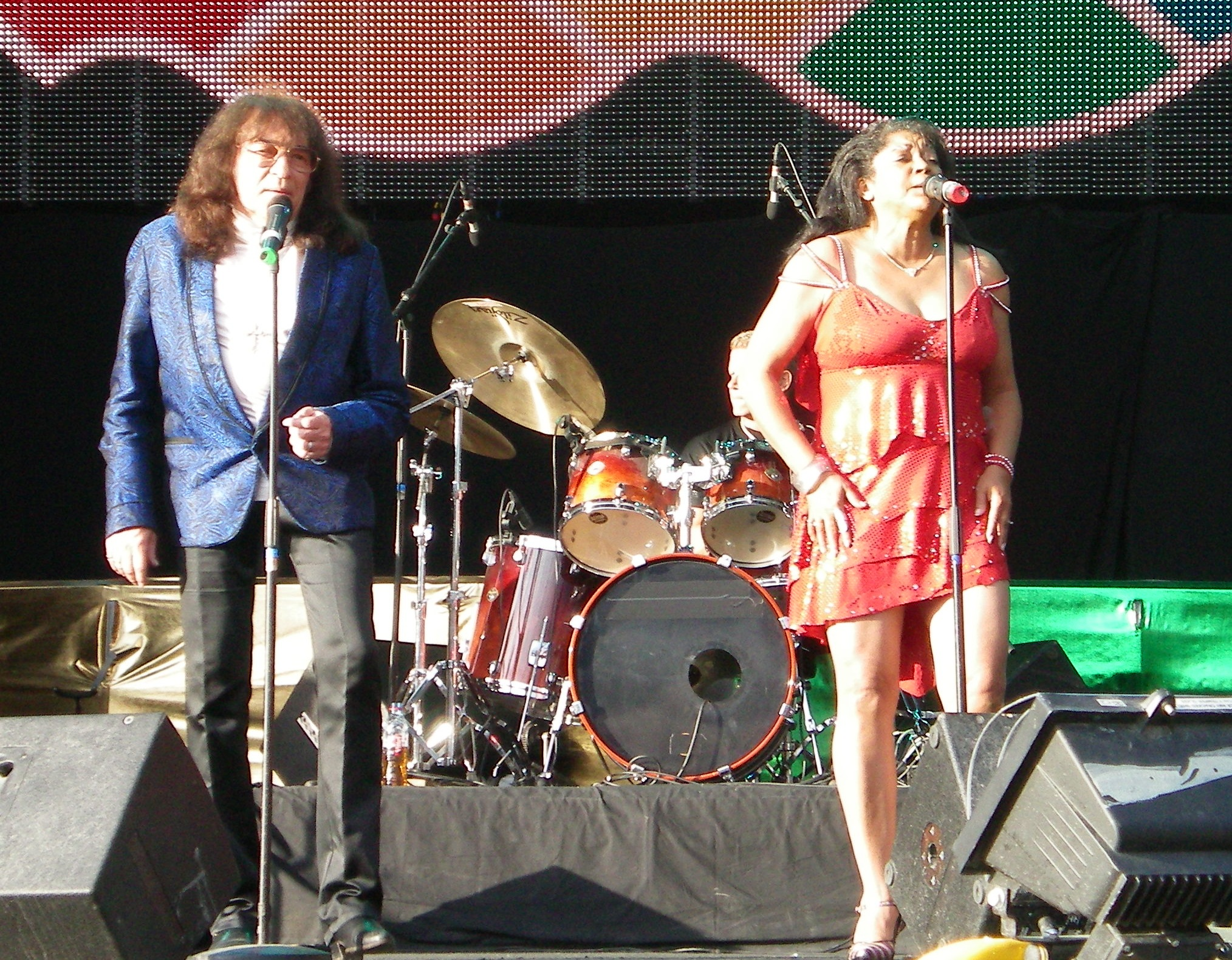
- Svenne and Lotta perform at Stockholm Pride 2008 with the Hep Stars.

Background information
- Origin: Sweden
- Genres: Rock, pop
- Years active: 1969–2014
- Labels: Olga Records, Cupol, EMI, Polar Music, Sonet Records, Gazell Records, PolyGram, Universal
- Members: Svenne Hedlund; Lotta Hedlund

Svenne & Lotta (in some countries as Sven & Charlotte) was a pop duo composed of Svenne Hedlund and Lotta Hedlund. They met in 1967, when (along with future ABBA member Benny Andersson) Svenne Hedlund was the vocalist in the band Hep Stars and Charlotte Jean Walker, which was Lotta Hedlund's name at that time, toured in Sweden with the all-girl US R&B trio The Sherrys.

== History ==
The couple met at Jerry Williams' 'Hamburger börs' show, after which they spent time together during the Swedish leg of Lotta's concert tour with the Sherrys. Upon Lotta's return to America, the pair missed each other that Lotta soon travelled back to Sweden; this time with her three children. Seeking parental approval, Lotta also brought her mother to meet Svenne.

With the Hep Stars' popularity diminishing, Lotta was brought in as a new member of the band, along with Benny's songwriting colleague, Björn Ulvaeus. This constellation released two studio albums on their own record label Romance Records, Compromise and Tillsammans. The new line-up didn't last long however, with Benny and Björn setting their sights on international stardom with their fiancées, Anni-Frid Lyngstad and Agnetha Fältskog. Aiming to follow in ABBA's victorious footsteps, Svenne and Lotta competed in the Swedish heats for the Eurovision Song Contest, Melodifestivalen 1975, with the song "Bang-A-Boomerang", but finished 3rd. The song however became their breakthrough in Scandinavia, and the duo became especially popular in Denmark. In the early 1980s they even took the unusual step of recording a Danish-language version of their Swedish hit "När Dagen Försvinner" (a cover of Alan Sorrenti's "Tu sei l'unica donna per me"), retitled "Når Dagen Forsvinder".

As artists on the Polar Music record label, owned by ABBA's manager Stig Anderson, Svenne & Lotta released various singles and albums produced by Benny and Björn. These mainly composed of covers of 1960s hits, later on their own material. Throughout the years they got more songs delivered by their producers, like "If We Only Had the Time" and "Roly Poly Girl", both previously recorded in Swedish by Björn and Benny as "Tänk om jorden vore ung" and "Kära gamla sol" respectively on their 1970 album Lycka. Most notable of all is arguably "Funky Feet", included on Svenne & Lotta's 1976 album Letters; originally written for ABBA's Arrival album, Benny and Björn felt it was too similar to the already-recorded "Dancing Queen"; one of two officially released recordings of the track; the other being Australian pop duo The Studs, who scored a Top 10 in Australia in 1977 with the song. In 1974 the group released a cover of ABBA's "Dance (While the Music Still Goes On)" as a single in Australia, backed with a version of "He Is Your Brother". The single was produced by ABBA's Björn and Benny and the duo subsequently also recorded a Swedish language version of the A-side, entitled "Kom ta en sista dans med mig", which became a major Svensktoppen hit in 1975.

In 1980, Svenne and Lotta signed with Sonet Records and released three albums produced by Ola Håkansson, at the time lead singer with the band Secret Service. The albums featured material written by among others Håkansson, Peo Thyrén, Tim Norell and Alexander Bard, who also went on to find international success with Army of Lovers in the 1990s. From the early 1980s the couple resided in Sävsjö, Småland, and from the early 1990s they frequently toured Scandinavia, occasionally under the moniker The Hep Stars. After 2000, Sven teamed up with some other Swedish 1960s male singers as the act Idolerna (The Idols).

In 2000, the duo returned to Melodifestivalen, and they sang "Bara du och jag" with Swedish rappers Balsam Boys (Gustav Eurén and Stefan Deak). In 2005, they also made a special anniversary appearance in the show, performing "Bang-A-Boomerang" for 30 years after they first competed with the song.

Svenne and Lotta remained active and released records in Swedish, English, and Danish until their divorce in 2014.

== Albums discography ==
- Songs We Sang 68 Hep Stars - Lotta not credited] (Olga Records, 1968)
- Hep Stars På Svenska [Hep Stars - Lotta not credited] (Olga Records, 1969)
- Hep Stars Bästa [Hep Stars - Lotta not credited] (Olga Records, 1970)
- Compromise (Romance Records/CBS-Cupol, 1970)
- Tillsammans (Romance Records/CBS-Cupol, 1971)
- Oldies But Goodies (Polar Music, 1973) (Polydor Records, Germany, 1973)
- Svenne & Lotta Med Hep Stars 1966-1968 (EMI, 1973)
- Svenne & Lotta/2 (Polar Music, 1975)
- Letters (Polar Music, 1976)
- 20 Golden Hits [includes four tracks originally released as 'The Hep Stars'; "Holiday for Clowns", "A Flower in My Garden", "Let It Be Me" & "Speedy Gonzales"] (Polar Music, 1977)
- Bring It On Home (Polar Music, 1978)
- Rolls-Royce (Gazell/Sonet, 1980)
- Det Är En Härlig Feeling (Gazell/Sonet, 1981)
- Love in Colour (Sonet, 1983)
- Från Cadillac Till Rolls-Royce [Hep Stars/Svenne & Lotta] (Sonet, 1991)
- Nästan Bara På Svenska [Svenne & Lotta med Hep Stars] (EMI, 1992)
- Oldies But Greatest (new versions of greatest hits, CMC, Denmark, 1995)
- Oldies But Greatest 2 (new versions of greatest hits, CMC, Denmark, 1995)
- The Very Best of Svenne & Lotta (new versions of greatest hits, Go On Deluxe, Denmark, 1996)
- The Great Collection (new versions of greatest hits, double album, CMC, Denmark, 2000)
- Tio Gyllene År Med Svenne & Lotta - 1973-1983 (Universal Music, 2002)
- 20 Golden Hits (Universal Music, 2004)

== Main singles discography ==
- "Let It Be Me" ("Je t'appartiens") / "Groovy Summertime" [Hep Stars - Lotta not credited] (Olga Records, 1968)
- "I sagans land" / "Tända på varann" [Hep Stars - Lotta not credited] (Olga Records, 1968)
- "Holiday for Clowns" / "A Flower in My Garden" [Hep Stars - Lotta not credited] (Olga Records, 1968]
- "Speleman" / "Precis som alla andra" [Hep Stars - Lotta not credited] (Olga Records, 1969)
- "Speedy Gonzales" / "Är det inte kärlek säg?" ("Little Green Apples") [Hep Stars - Lotta not credited] (Olga Records, 1969)
- "Speedy Gonzales" / "Let It Be Me" ("Je t'appartiens") [Hep Stars med Svenne & Lotta] (EMI, Denmark, 1969)
- "Små små ord" / "Världen e' nog som den e'" (Romance Records, 1971)
- "Peter Pan" / "Blunda lite grann och dröm" (Date Records, 1972)
- "Sandy" / "Makin' Love" (Polar Music, 1973) (Polydor Records, Germany, 1973), (Laurie Records, US, 1974)
- "Be My Baby" / "Ginny Come Lately" (Polar Music, 1973),
- "Do You Want to Dance?" / "Just Ask Your Heart" (Polar Music, 1973)
- "Breaking Up Is Hard to Do" / "The Dreamer (Hush-A-Bye)" (Polar Music, 1973)
- "Dance (While the Music Still Goes On)" / "He Is Your Brother" (Polar Music, 1974), (RCA Records, Australia, 1974), (MGM Records, US, 1974)
- "Bang en boomerang" / "Kom ta en sista dans med mig" ("Dance (While the Music Still Goes On)" (Polar Music, 1975)
- "Bang-A-Boomerang" / "Roly Poly Girl" ("Kära gamla sol") (Polar Music, 1975), (Polydor Records, Germany, 1975), (IBC Records, Belgium, 1975), (Morningstar Records, US, 1976) - AUS #94
- "Extra Extra (Read All About It)" / "Changes" (Polar Music, 1976), (RCA Records, Australia, 1976)
- "Funky Feet" / "Rocky" (Polar Music, 1976)
- "Can't Stop Myself (From Loving You)" / "Where Were You" ("Har du glömt") (Polydor Records, Germany, 1979)
- "All Day in Love" / "När dagen försvinner" ("Tu sei l'unica donna per me") (Gazell/Sonet, 1980)
- "Don't Put Me Down" / "Queen of the Night" (Gazell/Sonet, 1980)
- "Når Dagen Forsvinder" ("Tu sei l'unica donna per me") / "All Day in Love" (Gazell/Sonet, Denmark, 1980)
- "Om jag fick leva om mitt liv" ("I'll Never Be the One") / "När jag behövde dig mest" ("Just When I Needed You Most") (Gazell/Sonet, 1981)
- "Här är min symfoni" ("This Is My Symphony") / "Bara du" ("Only You") (Gazell/Sonet, 1982)
- "Svenne & Lotta Medley Mix" (CMC Records, Denmark, 1994)
