= Torrespaña =

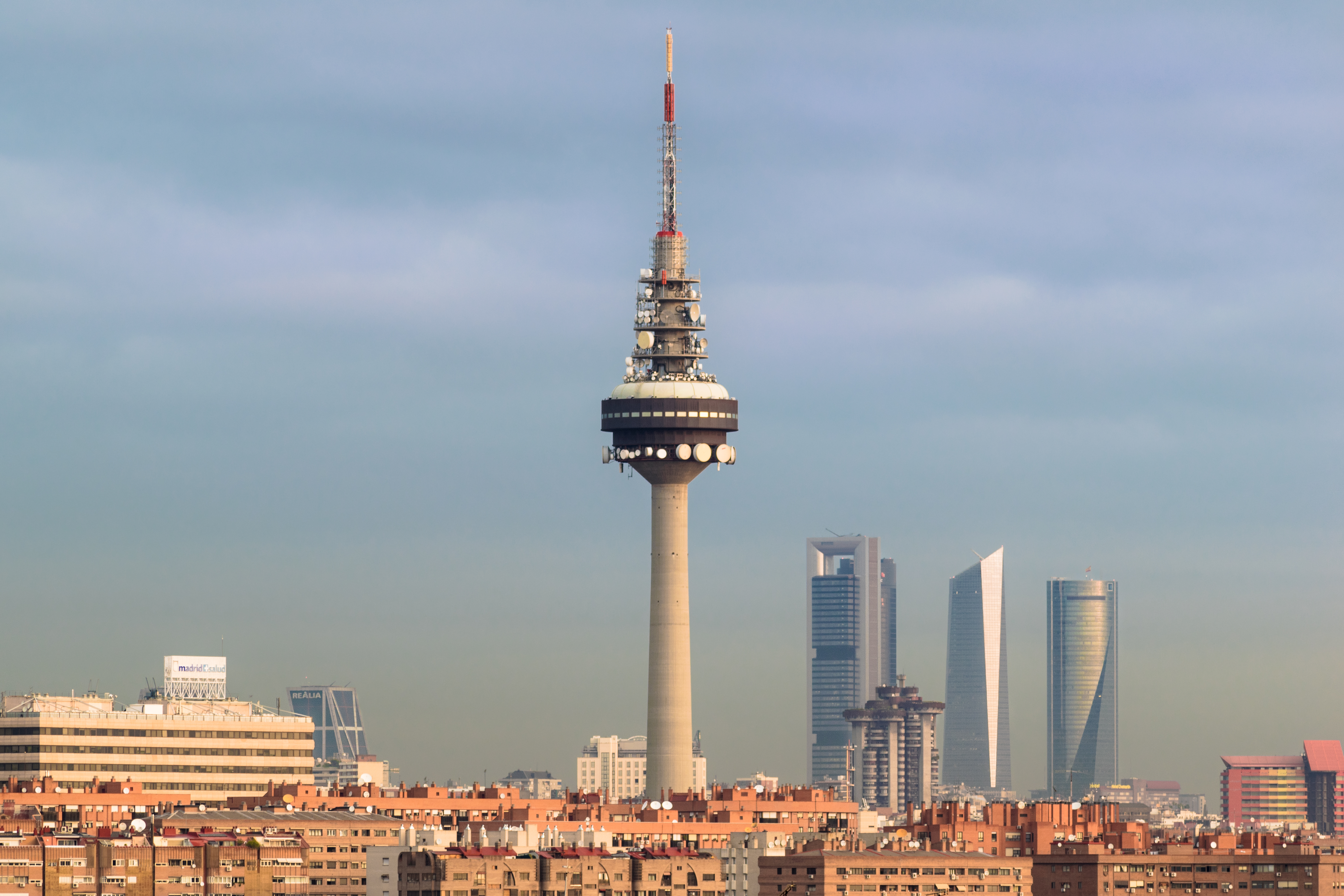
- Interactive map of the Torrespaña area
- Alternative names: El Pirulí

General information
- Status: Completed
- Type: Broadcast tower
- Location: Madrid, Spain
- Coordinates: 40.420278°N 3.664167°W
- Construction started: 17 February 1981
- Inaugurated: 7 June 1982
- Cost: 350 million ₧
- Owner: Cellnex

Height
- Height: 232 m (761 ft)

Technical details
- Lifts/elevators: 1

Design and construction
- Architect: Emilio Fernández Martínez de Velasco
- Main contractor: DragadosAgroman

Torrespaña is a 232 m (761.15 ft) high reinforced concrete freestanding broadcasting tower in Madrid, Spain. It is the central and main transmission node of the terrestrial television and radio networks in the country as well as the station that covers the city and its metropolitan area. National and regional television channels and radio stations broadcast from there. The tower, currently owned by Cellnex, is located in a depression at the Salamanca district near the M30 highway.

Torrespaña is also the name of the television production center at the foot of the tower where the central news services of Televisión Española (TVE) are located. Both facilities were built by Radiotelevisión Española (RTVE) on the occasion of the 1982 FIFA World Cup.

== Characteristics ==
Torrespaña is a 220 m (721.78 ft) high reinforced concrete freestanding broadcasting tower that reaches 232 m (761.15 ft) with the antenna on top. Its shaft supports eight floors and more than four hundred different antennas. Despite its height and panoramic views, it is not open to the public.

Torrespaña is the central and main transmission node of the terrestrial television and radio networks in Spain. It is in visual contact with the production centers of the main national broadcasters. Through a radio link, they send their signal to the tower, which is in charge of relay it to all the repeaters in the country. Radiotelevisión Española (RTVE), Mediaset España, Atresmedia and PRISA, among others, broadcast their television channels and radio stations nationwide through Torrespaña.

The tower is also the broadcasting station that covers Madrid and its metropolitan area. Regional broadcasters, such as Radio Televisión Madrid (RTVM), also broadcast throughout the tower.

It is also used by the broadcasters as a link to receive the signal from remote broadcasts.

== History ==
Torrespaña was built as part of the infrastructure works for the 1982 FIFA World Cup, which allowed Televisión Española (TVE), who held the monopoly on television broadcasting in the country and was in charge of producing the official live television feed of the event, to carry out a major modernization with the construction of the broadcasting tower and the production center at its foot. Both facilities were designed by RTVE's architect Emilio Fernández Martínez de Velasco.

Construction work on the tower began on 17 February 1981 and was completed in just twelve months. It was carried out by the temporary union of the companies Dragados and Agroman and it costed 350 million pesetas. The freestanding construction technique used was pioneering, as it had never been used before, and it makes the tower stand by its own weight. The idea of installing a revolving restaurant in the tower was initially considered, but was soon rejected for safety and economic reasons.

The tower and the production center were inaugurated on 7 June 1982 by the King and the Queen of Spain, although the tower was in operation since the night of 18 May. The production center, which served as the International Broadcast Centre during the World Cup, was occupied by TVE's central news services after it.

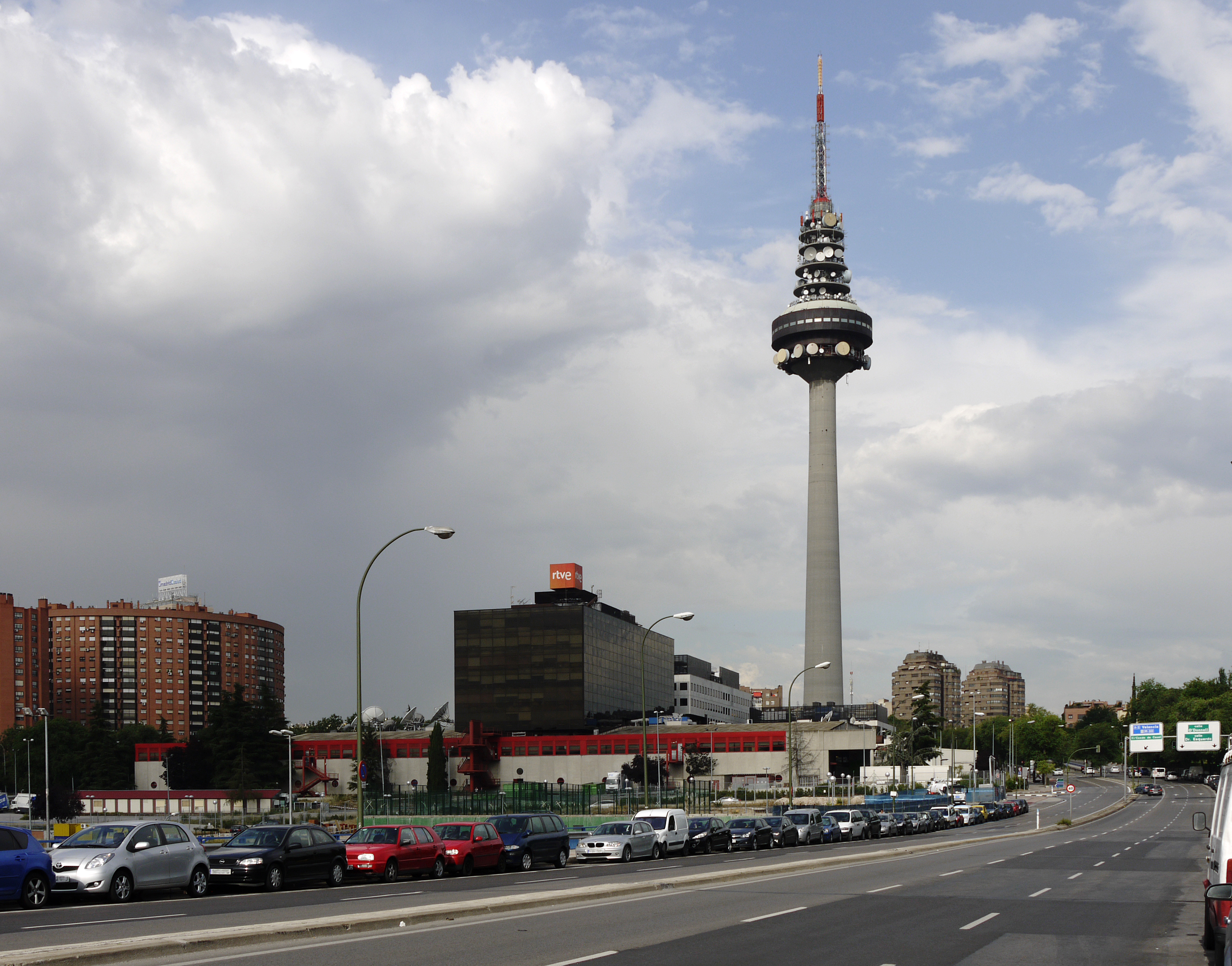
The broadcasting tower (back) and the production center (front).

On 19 May 1989, in response to the European Economic Community (EEC) requirement to separate the natural monopoly of infrastructure management from the competitive operations of running services, and with the imminent arrival of commercial television, RTVE's broadcasting network, including the Torrespaña tower, was transferred to Retevisión. TVE kept the production center at the foot of the tower where its master control room, its central newsroom, the 24 Horas news channel, Telediario and Informe Semanal studios are still located.

In December 2003, Abertis acquired Retevision, thus the Torrespaña tower became their property under Abertis Telecom. On 1 April 2015, Abertis Telecom was renamed to Cellnex to prepare for its stock launch.

== In popular culture ==
Torrespaña is popularly known as "El Pirulí", given the similarity between the tower and a particular type of lollipop of conical shape very popular in Spain in the eighties.
