= Papa Chico =

1985 song by Italian drummer Tony Esposito

Single by Tony Esposito, Gianluigi Di Franco, Remo Licastro

from the album As tu as
- Released: 1985
- Recorded: 1985
- Genre: Pop
- Label: Bubble ITA
- Songwriter: Tony Esposito
- Producers: Tony Esposito, Mauro Malavasi

"Papa Chico" is a song by Italian drummer, percussionist and vocalist Tony Esposito. It was released as a single from his seventh album As tu as (1985), topping the charts in Austria, Belgium, the Netherlands and Italy. "Papa Chico" became Esposito’s biggest international hit after "Kalimba de Luna" (1984). Both songs were covered by Boney M.

== Releases ==
7" Single

- "Papa Chico" - 4:01 / "As tu as" - 3:55 (Hansa 107 661–100, Germany)

== Boney M. version ==
"Papa Chico"

Single by Boney M.

from the album More Gold - 20 Super Hits Vol. II
- Released: April 1994
- Recorded: 1993
- Genre: Pop
- Label: BMG Records FRG
- Songwriters: Tony Esposito, Gianluigi Di Franco, Remo Licastro
- Producer: Frank Farian

Boney M. singles chronology
"Ma Baker (Remix)" (1993)	"Papa Chico" (1994)	"Ma Baker (Remix)" (1999)

Audio video
- "Papa Chico" on YouTube

"Papa Chico" is a Boney M. single from 1994, recorded by original lead singer Liz Mitchell as one of four new tracks on the compilation album More Gold - 20 Super Hits Vol. II. The single, credited to Boney M. feat. Liz Mitchell, pictured the singer's line-up with Carol Grey, Patricia Foster and Curt Dee Daran on the cover, and also included the ballad "Time to Remember" from the same album. The single failed to chart anywhere.

== C-Bra version ==
The song was also covered by the group C-Bra in 1999.

== Releases ==
CD
Boney M. feat Liz Mitchell: "Papa Chico" (BMG 74321 20364 2, 1994)

1. "Papa Chico" (Radio Version) - 3:52
2. "Time to Remember" (Farian, Kawohl, Bischof-Fallenstein) - 3:15
3. "Papa Chico" (Club Mix) - 4:22
4. "Papa Chico" (Rap Version) - 4:44

12" Single

- "Papa Chico" (Club Mix) - 4:22 / (Radio Version) - 3:52 / (Rap Version) - 4:43 / "Time to Remember" (Edit Version) - 3:15

== Sources ==
- "Papa Chico". swisscharts.com.
