= List of European number-one hits of 1977 =

This is a list of the Europarade number-one singles of 1977.

| Date | Song | Artist |
|---|---|---|
| 1 January | "If You Leave Me Now" | Chicago |
| 8 January | "Money, Money, Money" | ABBA |
| 15 January | "If You Leave Me Now" | Chicago |
| 22 January | "If You Leave Me Now" | Chicago |
| 29 January | "Under the Moon of Love" | Showaddywaddy |
| 5 February | "Under the Moon of Love" | Showaddywaddy |
| 12 February | "Living Next Door to Alice" | Smokie |
| 19 February | "Living Next Door to Alice" | Smokie |
| 26 February | "Living Next Door to Alice" | Smokie |
| 5 March | "Living Next Door to Alice" | Smokie |
| 12 March | "When I Need You" | Leo Sayer |
| 19 March | "Knowing Me, Knowing You" | ABBA |
| 26 March | "Knowing Me, Knowing You" | ABBA |
| 2 April | "Knowing Me, Knowing You" | ABBA |
| 9 April | "Knowing Me, Knowing You" | ABBA |
| 15 April | "Lay Back in the Arms of Someone" | Smokie |
| 22 April | "Lay Back in the Arms of Someone" | Smokie |
| 29 April | "Lay Back in the Arms of Someone" | Smokie |
| 6 May | "Lay Back in the Arms of Someone" | Smokie |
| 13 May | "Lay Back in the Arms of Someone" | Smokie |
| 20 May | "Lay Back in the Arms of Someone" | Smokie |
| 26 May | "Whodunnit" | Tavares |
| 2 June | "Beautiful Rose" | George Baker Selection |
| 9 June | "Ma Baker" | Boney M. |
| 16 June | "Ma Baker" | Boney M. |
| 23 June | "Ma Baker" | Boney M. |
| 30 June | "Ma Baker" | Boney M. |
| 7 July | "Ma Baker" | Boney M. |
| 14 July | "Ma Baker" | Boney M. |
| 21 July | "Ma Baker" | Boney M. |
| 28 July | "Ma Baker" | Boney M. |
| 4 August | "Yes Sir, I Can Boogie" | Baccara |
| 11 August | "Yes Sir, I Can Boogie" | Baccara |
| 18 August | "Yes Sir, I Can Boogie" | Baccara |
| 25 August | "I Feel Love" | Donna Summer |
| 1 September | "I Feel Love" | Donna Summer |
| 8 September | "I Feel Love" | Donna Summer |
| 15 September | "I Feel Love" | Donna Summer |
| 22 September | "I Feel Love" | Donna Summer |
| 29 September | "I Feel Love" | Donna Summer |
| 6 October | "Sorry, I'm a Lady" | Baccara |
| 13 October | "Way Down" | Elvis Presley |
| 20 October | "Way Down" | Elvis Presley |
| 27 October | "I Remember Elvis Presley (The King Is Dead)" | Danny Mirror |
| 3 November | "Way Down" | Elvis Presley |
| 10 November | "The Name Of The Game" | ABBA |
| 17 November | "The Name Of The Game" | ABBA |
| 24 November | "The Name Of The Game" | ABBA |
| 1 December | "The Name Of The Game" | ABBA |
| 8 December | "The Name Of The Game" | ABBA |
| 15 December | "The Name Of The Game" | ABBA |
| 22 December | "The Name Of The Game" | ABBA |
| 29 December | "Mull of Kintyre"/"Girls' School" | Paul McCartney & Wings |
