= Charlotte Walker =

Charlotte Walker may refer to:

- Charlotte Walker (politician), Australian politician
- Charlotte Walker (actress), Broadway theater actress
- Lotta Hedlund, singer who used the stage name "Charlotte Walker" in the 1960s
