= List of number-one hits of 1972 (Mexico) =

This is a list of the songs that reached number one in Mexico in 1972, according to Billboard magazine with data provided by Radio Mil. Also included are the number-one songs according to the Record World magazine.

== Chart history (Billboard) ==
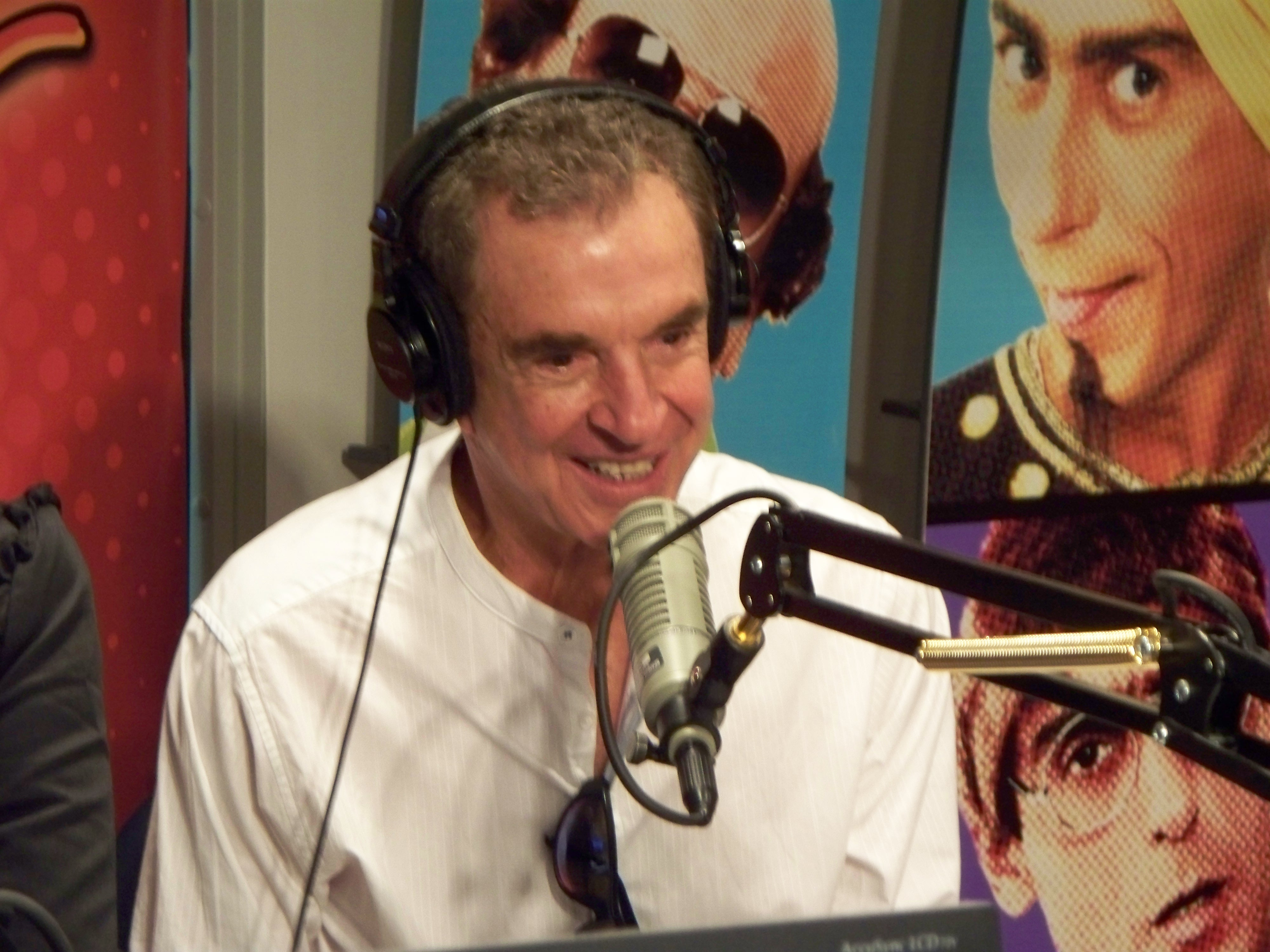
Singer Roberto Jordán (pictured) earned his second number-one hit with "No se ha dado cuenta", written by Juan Gabriel (who also had his first number-one hit earlier that year with "No tengo dinero").

Issue date	Song	Artist(s)	Label	Ref.
January 8	"Porque yo te amo"	Sandro de América	CBS	
January 22	"Rosas rojas"	Massimo Ranieri	CBS	
February 5	"No tengo dinero"	Juan Gabriel	RCA	
February 12	"No tengo dinero"	Juan Gabriel	RCA	
February 19	"No tengo dinero"	Juan Gabriel	RCA	
March 4	"Them Changes"	Buddy Miles	Mercury	
March 11	"Desiderata"	Arturo Benavides	Warner Bros.	
March 18	"Desiderata"	Arturo Benavides	Warner Bros.	
March 25	"Desiderata"	Arturo Benavides	Warner Bros.	
April 1	"Desiderata"	Arturo Benavides	Warner Bros.	
April 8	"Desiderata"	Arturo Benavides	Warner Bros.	
April 15	"Desiderata"	Arturo Benavides	Warner Bros.	
April 22	"Desiderata"	Arturo Benavides	Warner Bros.	
April 29	"Corazón de roca"	Los Fresno	Capitol	
May 13	"Corazón de roca"	Los Fresno	Capitol	
June 3	"Corazón de roca"	Los Fresno	Capitol	
June 10	"No se ha dado cuenta"	Roberto Jordán	RCA	
June 17	"Puppy Love"	Donny Osmond	MGM	
June 24	"Puppy Love"	Donny Osmond	MGM	
July 1	"Puppy Love"	Donny Osmond	MGM	
July 8	"Puppy Love"	Donny Osmond	MGM	
July 15	"Puppy Love"	Donny Osmond	MGM	
July 22	"Verónica"	Víctor Yturbe "El Pirulí"	Philips	
July 29	"Verónica"	Víctor Yturbe "El Pirulí"	Philips	
August 5	"Verónica"	Víctor Yturbe "El Pirulí"	Philips	
August 12	"Verónica"	Víctor Yturbe "El Pirulí"	Philips	
August 19	"Verónica"	Víctor Yturbe "El Pirulí"	Philips	
August 26	"¿Por qué?"	Los Baby's	Peerless	
September 2	"¿Por qué?"	Los Baby's	Peerless	
September 9	"¿Por qué?"	Los Baby's	Peerless	
September 16	"¿Por qué?"	Los Baby's	Peerless	
September 23	"¿Por qué?"	Los Baby's	Peerless	
September 30	"¿Por qué?"	Los Baby's	Peerless	
October 14	"Miénteme"	Víctor Yturbe "El Pirulí"	Philips	
October 28	"Miénteme"	Víctor Yturbe "El Pirulí"	Philips	
November 18	"Beautiful Sunday"	Daniel Boone	Musart	
November 25	"Miénteme"	Víctor Yturbe "El Pirulí"	Philips	
December 9	"Volverá el amor"	Virginia López	GAS	
December 16	"Río rebelde"	Julio Iglesias	Polydor	
December 23	"Río rebelde"	Julio Iglesias	Polydor	

=== By country of origin ===
Number-one artists:

Country of origin	Number of artists	Artists
Mexico	6	Arturo Benavides
Mexico	6	Juan Gabriel
Mexico	6	Los Baby's
Mexico	6	Los Fresno
Mexico	6	Roberto Jordán
Mexico	6	Víctor Yturbe "El Pirulí"
United States	2	Buddy Miles
United States	2	Donny Osmond
Argentina	1	Sandro de América
Italy	1	Massimo Ranieri
Puerto Rico	1	Virginia López
Spain	1	Julio Iglesias
United Kingdom	1	Daniel Boone

Number-one compositions (it denotes the country of origin of the song's composer[s]; in case the song is a cover of another one, the name of the original composition is provided in parentheses):

Country of origin	Number of compositions	Compositions
Mexico	6	"¿Por qué?"
Mexico	6	"Corazón de roca"
Mexico	6	"Miénteme"
Mexico	6	"No se ha dado cuenta"
Mexico	6	"No tengo dinero"
Mexico	6	"Verónica"
Argentina	2	"Porque yo te amo"
Argentina	2	"Río rebelde"
United States	2	"Desiderata"
United States	2	"Them Changes"
Canada	1	"Puppy Love"
Italy	1	"Rosas rojas" ("Rose rosse")
Venezuela	1	"Volverá el amor"
United Kingdom	1	"Beautiful Sunday"

== Chart history (Record World) ==
Issue date	Song	Artist(s)	Ref.
January 1	"Rosa marchita"	Roberto Jordán	
March 4	"Rosa marchita"	Roberto Jordán	
March 18	"No tengo dinero"	Juan Gabriel	
April 29	"No tengo dinero"	Juan Gabriel	
June 3	"No se ha dado cuenta"	Roberto Jordán	
July 8	"No se ha dado cuenta"	Roberto Jordán	
July 22	"No se ha dado cuenta"	Roberto Jordán	
August 19	"No se ha dado cuenta"	Roberto Jordán	
September 30	"Popcorn"	Hot Butter	
November 11	"¿Por qué?"	Los Baby's	
December 2	"¿Por qué?"	Los Baby's	
December 23	"¿Por qué?"	Los Baby's	

== See also ==
- 1972 in music

== Sources ==
- Print editions of the Billboard magazine from January 6 to December 23, 1972.
