= Verónica (Víctor Yturbe song) =

1972 single by Víctor Yturbe

Single by Víctor Yturbe "El Pirulí"

from the album Condición
- Language: Spanish
- B-side: "Miénteme"
- Released: 1972
- Genre: Bolero
- Length: 3:54
- Label: Philips Records
- Songwriter: Carlos Blanco

"Verónica" is a popular song written by Mexican songwriter Carlos Blanco and recorded by Mexican singer Víctor Yturbe "El Pirulí" in 1972. Upon its release, the song had great success in Mexico, where it topped the singles charts.

== Background and release ==
The song was written by Carlos Blanco, a songwriter from the Mexican state of Puebla, and its original title was "Güerita" (which in Mexican slang is the diminutive form of "güera", a term that is used to describe a blonde or fair-skinned woman). When Blanco showed Yturbe the song, the latter suggested changing its title so as to reference Verónica Castro, a famous Mexican actress; Blanco agreed to the change, and thus Yturbe recorded the song, which was released in 1972 as a single (with the song "Miénteme" as the B-side) as well as being included in Yturbe's studio album "Condición".

The song quickly became popular in Mexico, where it would eventually top the singles charts, and it was popularly associated with the aforementioned Verónica Castro; Yturbe performed the song for Castro on a TV show, and Mexican tabloids even published rumours of a supposed affair between the two.

== Chart performance ==
The song entered the Mexican charts on the 10 June 1972 week and it reached the number-one position on the 22 July week (displacing "Puppy Love" by Donny Osmond), where it would stay for five consecutive weeks before being displaced by "¿Por qué?", by Los Baby's; it remained in the top 10 until the 30 September week. "Verónica" was Yturbe's second number-one single, and it would be his first of 1972, as he would reach the number-one position again in October with the song "Miénteme".

Chart (1972)	Peak position
Mexico (Radio Mil)	1

== Cover versions ==
The song would later be covered by other Mexican groups such as La Rondalla de Saltillo and Los Socios del Ritmo (in a cumbia version), among others. A Portuguese-language version was also released by Brazilian singer Mauricio Reis in 1974.

== See also ==
- List of number-one hits of 1972 (Mexico)
- 1970s in Latin music
