= Tony Esposito (musician) =

Italian musician (born 1950)

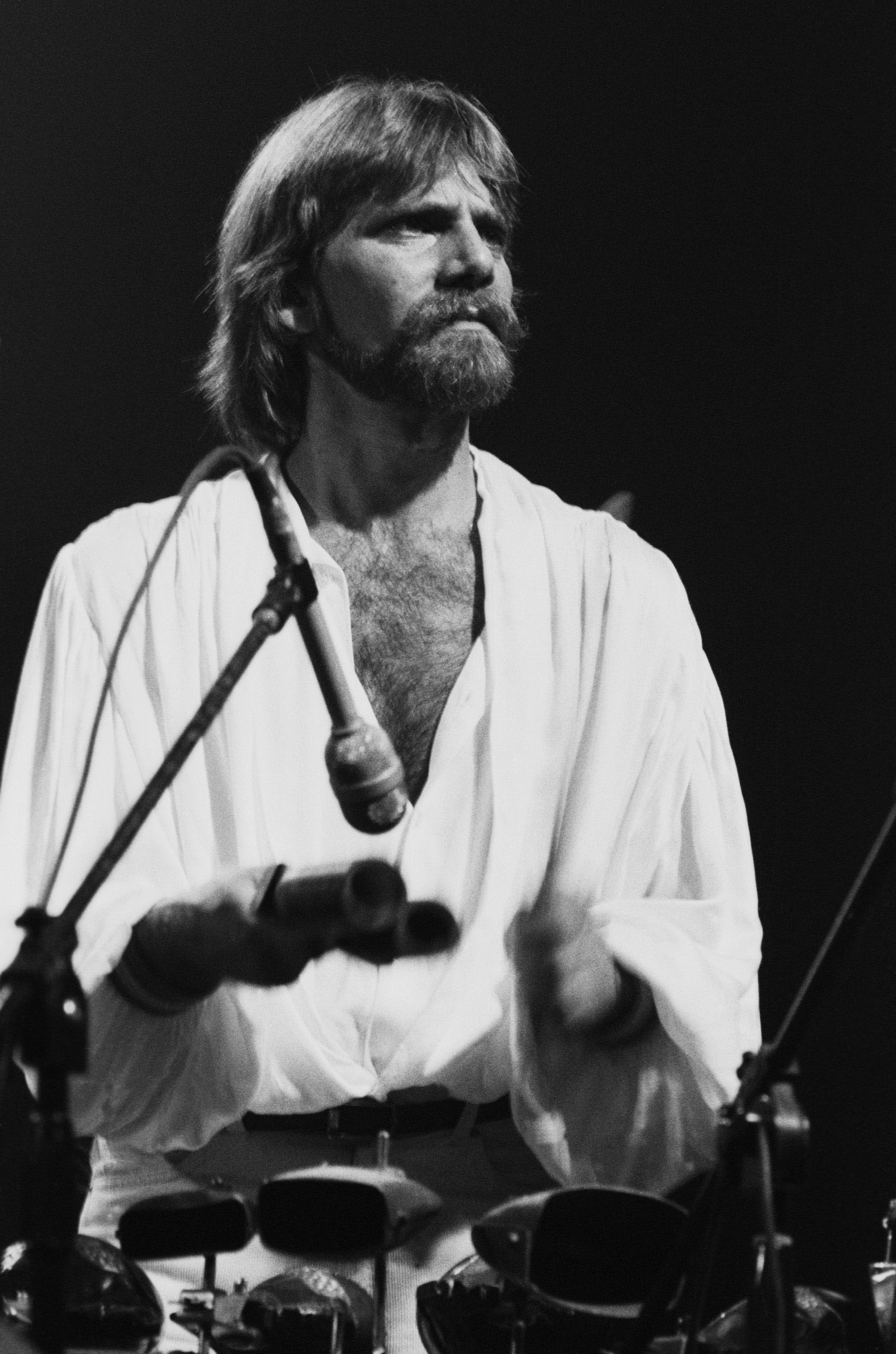
- Esposito performing in 1982

Background information
- Born: Antonio Esposito; 16 July 1950 (age 76); Naples, Italy
- Occupations: Singer; songwriter; musician
- Years active: 1972–present
- Musical career
- Genres: Italo disco; pop; jazz; jazz fusion
- Instruments: Vocals; drums
- Labels: Numero Uno; Bubble

Antonio "Tony" Esposito (born 16 July 1950) is an Italian percussionist, songwriter and musician. He is known for inventing and patenting the tamborder, an hybrid electronic percussive instrument.

== Career ==
Esposito was born in Naples. He started playing percussion in his teenage years. In the early 1970s, he played sessions and recorded with musicians such as Alan Sorrenti, Don Cherry, Don Moye, Gato Barbieri, Eumir Deodato, Brian Auger, Gilberto Gil and Pino Daniele. In 1975, he recorded his first solo album, Rosso napoletano, in collaboration with Paul Buckmaster.

Esposito is mostly well known for his 1984 hit single "Kalimba de Luna" from his album Il grande esploratore. After winning the Un disco per l'estate music festival, it charted in Italy and Switzerland. A cover version by Boney M reached No. 17 in Germany.

In 1987, his single "Papa Chico" was No. 2 in The Netherlands for 5 weeks and No. 3 in Belgium for 2 weeks.

In 1986, he won the Nastro d'argento Award for the soundtrack of Lina Wertmuller's film Camorra (A Story of Streets, Women and Crime).

== Discography ==
- Rosso napoletano (1975)
- Processione sul mare (1976)
- Gente distratta (1977)
- La banda del sole (1978)
- Tamburo (1982)
- Il grande esploratore (1984)
- As tu às (1985)
- Tony Esposito (1987)
- Villaggio globale (1990)
- Tropico (1996)
- Tony Esposito (anthology, 1997)
- Viaggio tribale (2003)
- Sentirai (2011)
- Tam Tam Bass (2013)

== Collaborations ==
- 1972: Aria – Alan Sorrenti
- 1973: Come un vecchio incensiere all'alba di un villaggio deserto – Alan Sorrenti
- 1973: Il re non-si diverte – Roberto Vecchioni
- 1973: Opera buffa – Francesco Guccini
- 1974: I buoni e i cattivi – Edoardo Bennato
- 1974: Stanze di vita quotidiana – Francesco Guccini
- 1974: Francesco De Gregori – Francesco De Gregori
- 1975: Io che non-sono l'imperatore – Edoardo Bennato
- 1975: La valle dei templi – Perigeo
- 1975: La torre di Babele – Edoardo Bennato
- 1976: Automobili – Lucio Dalla
- 1977: Samarcanda – Roberto Vecchioni
- 1977: Dialoghi del presente - Luciano Cilio
- 1981: Vai mò – Pino Daniele
- 2007: Il mio nome è Pino Daniele e vivo qui – Pino Daniele
- 2008: Ricomincio da 30 – Pino Daniele
