= More Gold – 20 Super Hits Vol. II =

Greatest hits album by Boney M.
- Released: October 1993
- Recorded: 1977–93
- Genre: Euro disco, reggae, R&B
- Length: 74:50
- Label: MCI/BMG (EU)
- Producer: Frank Farian

Boney M. chronology
The Greatest Hits (1993)	More Gold – 20 Super Hits Vol. II (1993)	Hit Collection (1996)

Singles from More Gold – 20 Super Hits Vol. II
- 1. "Ma Baker (Remix '93)" Released: August 1993; 2. "Papa Chico" Released: April 1994

More Gold – 20 Super Hits Vol. II is a 1993 greatest hits album by Boney M. Producer Frank Farian issued More Gold - 20 Super Hits Vol. II containing the remainder of Boney M.'s best known songs – again most of them appearing in remixed or overdubbed form but credited as the original versions – as well as four new recordings featuring lead singer Liz Mitchell. Two singles were released from the album in Europe, "Ma Baker Remix '93" and "Papa Chico", the latter credited as "Boney M. featuring Liz Mitchell" and released in early 1994.

== Track listing ==
1. "Love for Sale" (overdub mix) (Cole Porter) – 4:15
2. "Bahama Mama" (overdub mix) (Farian, Jay) – 3:16
3. "I See a Boat on the River" (overdub mix) (Farian, Jay, Rulofs) – 4:30
4. "Children of Paradise" (Farian, Jay, Reyam) – 3:20
5. "Calendar Song (Remix '93)" (Farian) – 3:25
6. "We Kill the World (Don't Kill the World)" (Farian, Sgarbi) – 4:30
7. "Jimmy" (1982 version, overdub mix) (Farian, Howell, Daansen) – 2:55
8. "I Shall Sing" (Taken from the medley "That's Boonoonoonoos", overdub mix) (Van Morrison) – 3:09
9. "Dreadlock Holiday (Rap-Sody)" (1987 Top Deck version) (Eric Stewart, Graham Gouldman) – 4:20
10. "Oceans of Fantasy" (overdub mix) (Kawohl, Jay, Zill) – 5:05
11. "Ribbons of Blue" (overdub mix) (Keith Forsey) – 4:02
12. "Motherless Child" (remix) (traditional) – 4:15
13. "I'm Born Again" (Jay, Rulofs) – 3:30
14. "My Cherie Amour" (overdub mix) (Stevie Wonder, Henry Cosby, Sylvia Moy) – 3:55
15. "Going Back West" (overdub mix) (Jimmy Cliff) – 3:10
16. "Ma Baker (Remix '93)" (Farian, Jay, Reyam) – 4:00
17. "Time to Remember" (Farian, Kawohl, Farian, Bischof Fallenstein) (new recording feat. Liz Mitchell) – 4:00
18. "Da La De La" (Kerim Saka, Mike Wonder, M. Hanief Correl) (new recording feat. Liz Mitchell & Marlon B.) – 4:00
19. "Papa Chico" (Tony Esposito) (new recording feat. Liz Mitchell) – 4:05
20. "Lady Godiva" (Farian, Bischof) (new recording feat. Liz Mitchell) – 3:40

== Personnel ==
- Liz Mitchell – lead vocals (1 - 5, 7 - 8, 11 - 13, 17 - 20), backing vocals
- Marcia Barrett – lead vocals (6), backing vocals (except tracks 17–20)
- Frank Farian – lead vocals (9 - 10), backing vocals
- Reggie Tsiboe – lead vocals (14 - 15)
- Marlon B. – vocals on track 18

Production

- Frank Farian – producer, remixer

== Charts ==
Chart (1993)	Peak position
Austrian Albums (Ö3 Austria)	38
Dutch Albums (Album Top 100)	87
New Zealand Albums (RMNZ)	43
