= Tu sei l'unica donna per me =

1979 Italian single by Alan Sorrenti

Single by Alan Sorrenti

from the album L.A. & N.Y.
- B-side: "All Day in Love"
- Released: 1 June 1979
- Genre: pop
- Label: EMI / Decca Records
- Songwriter(s): Alan Sorrenti
- Producer(s): Jay Graydon

Alan Sorrenti singles chronology
"Donna luna" (1978)	"Tu sei l'unica donna per me" (1979)	"Non so che darei" (1980)

Audio
- "Tu sei l'unica donna per me" on YouTube

"Tu sei l'unica donna per me" (transl. "You're the only woman for me") is a 1979 song written and performed by Alan Sorrenti.

Sorrenti's signature song and his main commercial success, the song won the 1979 Festivalbar and was the Italian best-selling single of the year. Sorrenti also recorded versions of the song in English and German language, respectively titled "All Day in Love" and "Alles, Was Ich Brauche, Bist Du". Artists who covered the song include Gianni Morandi, Umberto Tozzi, Albano Carrisi, Nino de Angelo, Claudia Jung, Hoffmann & Hoffmann, Hanne Krogh, Flamingokvintetten, Vikingarna, Svenne and Lotta and The Starlite Singers.

== Track listing ==
- 7" single
1. "Tu sei l'unica donna per me" (Alan Sorrenti)
2. "All Day in Love" (Steve Kipner-Alan Sorrenti)

== Charts ==
Chart (1979–80)	Peak position
Austria (Ö3 Austria Top 40)	2
Belgium (Ultratop 50 Wallonia)	2
Italy (Musica e dischi)	1
Netherlands (Dutch Top 40)	31
Switzerland (Schweizer Hitparade)	1
West Germany (Official German Charts)	13
