= Aria (Alan Sorrenti album) =

Studio album by Alan Sorrenti
- Released: 8 June 1972
- Studio: Sonic (Rome, Italy); Europa Sonor (Paris, France); S.E.E.D. (Vallauris, France)
- Genre: Progressive rock; progressive folk; psychedelic rock; psychedelic folk; folk rock; jazz fusion
- Length: 39:32
- Label: Harvest Records
- Producer: Michelangelo Romano

Alan Sorrenti chronology
Aria (1972)	Come un vecchio incensiere all'alba di un villaggio deserto (1973)

Singles from Aria
- 1. "Vorrei incontrarti/Un fiume tranquillo" Released: 1972

Aria (Italian: air, also aria) is the debut album by Italian singer-songwriter Alan Sorrenti, released in 1972. Displaying progressive and psychedelic sounds blending folk, rock and jazz, it has been highly praised by critics, being considered one of his best albums.

Aria blends dreamy, ethereal, suggestive melodies with changes in rhythm and register, thus displaying the advanced technic of the musicians within an overall fable-like atmosphere. Lyrics are poetic and sometimes hermetic: love is one of the main themes, sometimes seen in a more transcendental way (as in the title track "Aria"), whilst in "Vorrei incontrarti" (I'd like to meet you) the theme is the desperate research of love, a love that heals the soul from the feelings of loneliness and emptiness.

Also in 1972, "Vorrei incontrarti" was released as a single from the album, with the song "Un fiume tranquillo" as its B-side.

== Reception ==
Aria received wide critical acclaim and is considered the best work by the Neapolitan artist. The album achieved good success and Alan Sorrenti's virtuoso voice has drawn comparisons to Tim Buckley and Peter Hammill. Cesare Rizzi, who gives the album top scores, regards it as one of the best examples of Mediterranean progressive rock and considers the eponymous song one of the most inspired moments of the genre in Italy. Critic Riccardo Bertoncelli considers Aria the first completely accomplished Italian pop album. Diego Ballani of the magazine Rumore includes it amongst the Italian music classics to be discovered and affirms it "still radiates wonder". The album was also selected for the book I 100 migliori dischi del Progressive italiano, published in 2014 by Tsunami Edizioni and is present at position number 52 in the ranking of the 100 most beautiful Italian albums of all time according to Rolling Stone Italia.

== Tracklist ==
Lyrics and music by Alan Sorrenti.

A Side

No.	Title	Length
1.	"Aria"	19:45

B Side

No.	Title	Length
2.	"Vorrei incontrarti"	4:56
3.	"La mia mente"	7:34
4.	"Un fiume tranquillo"	7:57

== Charts ==
Chart (1972–1973)	Peak position
Italy (Musica e dischi)	14

== Personnel ==
- Alan Sorrenti – vocals, acoustic guitar
- Tony Esposito – drums, percussions
- Vittorio Nazzaro – bass guitar, classical guitar, acoustic guitar
- Albert Prince – piano, ARP, accordion (in "Vorrei incontrarti"), Hammond organ, mellotron, synthesizer
- Martin Paratore – acoustic guitar
- Luciano Cilio – piano
- Tony Bonfils – double bass
- Jean-Luc Ponty – violin (in "Aria")
- Andrè Lajdli – trumpet
- Jean Costa – trombone
- Franco Patrignani – sound engineering
- Umberto and Fiorella Tedesco – cover artwork

Arrangements by Alan Sorrenti and Albert Prince; mixing by Giulio Spelta; production by Corrado Bacchelli and Bruno Tibaldi.

== Bibliography ==
- Various Authors (edited by Gino Castaldo), Dizionario della canzone italiana, ed. Curcio, 1990; see entry Sorrenti, Alan, by Ernesto Bassignano, pgs. 1603–1604
- Paolo Barotto, Il Ritorno del Pop italiano, Editrice Stilgraf, Luserna San Giovanni, 1989; see entry Sorrenti Alan, pg. 142
- Various Authors (edited by Mauro Ronconi), 100 dischi ideali per capire la Nuova Canzone Italiana; Editori Riuniti, Roma, 2002; see entry Alan Sorrenti, Aria, by Mario Giammetti
