= C-Bra =

Austrian band

- Origin: Vienna, Austria
- Genres: Pop music
- Years active: 1998–2000
- Members: Kim Lone; Valérie Sajdik; Sarah Martin; Tanja Hilber
- Past members: Elke Kaufmann

C-Bra is a band from Austria. The vocalists are Valérie Sajdik, Elke Kaufmann, Kim Lone and Sarah Martin. Their only album, Mind Your Make Up, sold over a million copies. The band performed in Switzerland, Germany and Austria.

The band was formed by the producer David Bronner. The women were around 20 years old. In December 1998 Elke Kaufmann left the band and was replaced by Tanja Hilber from Switzerland. The band broke up in the year 2000.

The Band Name C-Bra is word play, meaning two different things. On one side the Bra size C and on the other side like the animal zebra, a free and wild but social spirit. The print of the fur is like a human fingerprint and individual. The band "was called the Spice Girls of Austria" by the newspaper Oberösterreichische Nachrichten.

C-Bra played several large concerts. These included at the football Worldcup fanzone in Dornbirn, at the Hitradio Ö3-Beach-Mania in Waldbad Feldkirch-Gisingen, and the Premierfest in Wels. In 1999 C-Bra performed at the Benefits concert "Nachbar in Not" at the Austrian television station ORF. In 2000 the band played their last concert at the charity event "Pop for Kids", also televised by ORF.

The band's first single Make up your mind, which was released in the year 1999, was in the Ö3 Austria Top 40 at position 19. The second single I love you today peaked at position 30. The summer hit Papa Chico, originally written by Toni Esposito, placed in the charts at number 15. The debut album Mind your make up was released in May 1999 and placed at number 38 in the Ö3 Austria Top 40. It was the only album they produced.

== Studio albums and singles ==
Year	Album details	Peak chart positions
Year	Album details	AUT
1999	Mind Your Make Up: Released: June 1999; Label: EMI Austria; Format: CD	38

Year	Single details	Peak chart positions
Year	Single details	AUT
1998	Make Up Your Mind: Released: August 1998; Label: EMI Austria; Format: CD	19
1999	Love You Today: Released: April 1999; Label: =EMI; Format: CD	30
1999	Papa Chico: Released: July 1999; Label: EMI; Format: CD	15

=== Others ===
- Mother And Child (single, 1998)
- Sunshine (single, 1999)

=== Collections ===
The single "Mother and Child" was released on various Christmas editions. In Ö3 Christmas Hits Volume2 (1998), Ö3 Christmas Hits Volume 2+ – Special Edition 2000 (2000) und Die Hit-Giganten – Weihnachten (Christmas Giant Hits) (2004).

Papa Chico was included in Ö3 Greatest Hits, Volume 11 and in Tigerenten Club, Vol. 7.
