= Rigo Tovar =

Mexican singer (1946–2005)

- Born: Rigoberto Tovar García; 29 March 1946; Matamoros, Tamaulipas
- Died: 27 March 2005 (aged 58)
- Genres: Bolero; cumbia; rock
- Occupations: Singer; musician
- Instruments: Vocals; guitar
- Years active: 1971-1994
- Label: Fonovisa Records

Rigoberto Tovar García (29 March 1946 – 27 March 2005), better known as Rigo Tovar, was a Mexican musician. Famous for his cumbias, Tovar infused traditional Mexican and Latin music with modern instruments like the electric guitar and synthesizer and popular styles such as rock and cumbia.

Tovar was born and raised in Matamoros, Tamaulipas. After moving to Houston, Texas, his musical career began to take off in the early 1970s. Blending cumbia, tropical, and modern rock, he quickly gained a large following. In 1971, Tovar released his first album entitled Matamoros Querido which garnered two hits, "Matamoros Querido" and "Lamento De Amor".

He sold over 30 million albums, and his work continues to influence artists across genres.

== Biography ==
Through extensive radio play and touring in Mexico and the United States, Tovar achieved great popularity and success. At the height of his fame, he was known as "El Ídolo de México" (Mexico's Idol) and "El Ídolo de las multitudes" (The Idol of the Masses). The release of the 1976 album, Amor y Cumbia take him to superstar status not only in Mexico but many other areas of Latin America as well as the United States. His adoring public coined the phrase "Rigo es Amor" which is translated in English as "Rigo is Love". This was attributed to the love songs he performed and the passion he poured into them. His music, voice and image were so endearing to so many that he became the living embodiment of love. It was routinely yelled out at his concerts and is still used when people speak of him.

Tovar's other hits include "La Sirenita", "Te tendré que olvidar", "¡Oh, Qué Gusto De Volverte A Ver!", and "Perdóname Mi Amor Por Ser Tan Guapo". He was most successful in the 1970s and 1980s and retired in the late 1990s; however, his music remains popular today. Tovar's musical group, El Conjunto Costa Azul, has gone through numerous line-up changes over the years and is still active today.

In 1979, Tovar broke the 300,000-person attendance record set in Monterrey, Nuevo León, Mexico earlier that year by Pope John Paul II when the artist performed a free concert. Some newspapers reporting on the new attendance record even ran headlines declaring that Tovar was "Bigger than the Pope".

Tovar also starred in several movies including Vivir Para Amar (1980), Rigo Es Amor (1980), and El Gran Triunfo (1981).

On 27 March 2005, just days shy of his 59th birthday, Tovar died from diabetic complications leading to cardio-respiratory failure. His funeral was held behind closed doors in a notable funeral home located in Mexico City, but fans and some members of his large family entered the funeral service by force. Tovar was cremated and his ashes were thrown onto one of Matamoros' beaches per his wishes.

== Legacy ==
In honor of his legacy, Tovar's hometown of Matamoros, Tamaulipas renamed a main avenue located in the northwest part of the city, Avenida Rigo Tovar. And the city of Matamoros made a statue of him.

== Discography ==
=== Select albums ===
- 1972: Matamoros Querido
- 1973: Cómo Será La Mujer
- 1974: En La Cumbre
- 1975: En Acción
- 1976: Te Quiero Dijiste...
- 1976: Rigo Tovar Y Su Conjunto Costa Azul
- 1976: Amor Y Cumbia
- 1977: Dos Tardes De Mi Vida
- 1978: ¡Oh, Qué Gusto De Volverte A Ver!
- 1979: Con Mariachi Vol. 1
- 1979: Reflexiona
- 1980: Rigo Tovar En Vivo
- 1980: Con Mariachi Vol. 2
- 1980: Rigo Rock
- 1981: Rigo '81
- 1982: 10 Años Tropicalísimo
- 1982: Sublime Y Bohemio
- 1984: De Nuevo En Contacto Musical
- 1985: El Músico Chiflado
- 1986: Quítate La Máscara
- 1986: Con Mariachi Vol. 3
- 1989: La Fiera
- 1989: Baila Mi Ritmo
- 1990: El Sirenito
- 1993: Rigo El Guapo
- 1994: Éxitos Con Banda Vol 1
- 1994: Exitos Con Banda Vol 2

=== Select compilations ===
- 1973: Crema De Cumbia
- 1977: El Romantico
- 1978: 30 Exitos De Rigo Tovar y su Costa Azul
- 1978: Mi Amiga, Mi Esposa, Mi Amante
- 1979: Mass... Crema De Cumbia
- 1979: Lo Maximo!
- 1979: El Recado
- 1979: 30 Exitos
- 1980: De Lo Nuevo... Lo Mejor
- 1980: 14 Cumbias De Oro Rigo Tovar y su Costa Azul y Los Bukis
- 1981: 14 Romanticas Rigo Tovar y Los Bukis
- 1982: 15 Exitos Tropicales
- 1982: 12 Exitos Rancheros De Rigo Tovar
- 1983: Los Grandes Exitos De Rigo Tovar
- 1984: 15 Exitos Románticos
- 1986: Tropicalisimo
- 1990: Los Últimos Éxitos De Rigo Tovar
- 1990: El Ritmo Del Sirenito
- 2003: Sigue Bailando Mi Ritmo
- 2005: La Historia De Un Ídolo
- 2006: Mi Tinajita Y Muchos Éxitos Más...

=== Select hits ===
- "Matamoros Querido"
- "Lamento De Amor" - Number-one hit in Mexico
- "Recordando Monterrey"
- "Enamorado De Verdad"
- "Como Sera La Mujer"
- "Pajarillo Montañero"
- "Me Quiero Casar"
- "El Testamento"
- "La Sirenita"
- "Amor Libre"
- "¡Oh, Qué Gusto De Volverte A Ver!"
- "Reflexiona"
- "Mi Amiga, Mi Esposa y Mi Amante"
- "Cuando Tu Cariño"
- "Así Soy Yo"
- "Amor Sincero"
- "No Que No"
- "No Son Palabritas"
- "Dos Tardes De Mi Vida"

== See also ==
- List of best-selling Latin music artists
- List of Mexican people
