= Cómo Será la Mujer =

Studio album by Rigo Tovar
- Released: 1973
- Recorded: 1972–1973
- Venue: 12 pesos uruguayos
- Studio: Rigo Tovar chronology
- Genre: Cumbia
- Length: 30:15
- Label: Universal Music Mexico
- Producer: Sessar Santos

Rigo Tovar chronology
Matamoros Querido (1972)	Cómo Será la Mujer (1973)	En la Cumbre (1974)

Cómo Será La Mujer is the second album by Rigo Tovar and the band Costa Azul.

== Track listing ==
Album listing on the original 1973 Vinyl Album:

1. Cómo Será La Mujer
2. Pajarillo Montañero
3. El Día Que Seas Para Mí
4. Me Voy Pa'l Pueblo
5. Venus
6. Novio Celoso
7. El Amor Que Se Alejó
8. Si Supiera Ella
9. Acapulco, Eres Mi Amor
10. Quizás, Quizás, Quizás

In 2003, this album was re-released in CD format by Univision Music Group with a different track listing:

1. Cómo Será La Mujer
2. Pajarillo Montañero
3. El Día Que Seas Para Mí
4. Me Voy Pa'l Pueblo
5. Quizás, Quizás, Quizás
6. Novio Celoso
7. El Amor Que Se Alejó
8. Si Supiera Ella
9. Acapulco, Eres Mi Amor
10. Venus
