= The Sherrys =

American girl group

The Sherrys were an American girl group from Philadelphia, Pennsylvania, United States, active briefly in the 1960s.

The group came together in 1961 around Philadelphia singer Little Joe Cook, former lead singer of The Thrillers; it featured two of his daughters Delphine and Dinell Cook, his niece Charlotte Butler plus their cousin Dolores "Honey" Wiley-Sowell. The band also briefly featured Tammi Terrell, who later left the group, and went on to Motown. Initially they acted as a backup ensemble for local acts such as Bobby Rydell. In 1962, a dance craze called 'The Popeye' shot to popularity, and the group recorded the tune "Pop Pop Pop-Pie" (written by Johnny Madara and Dave White, both future bandmembers in The Spokesmen) in hopes of capitalizing on it. The group was invited to perform on American Bandstand and the record peaked at number 25 on the US Billboard R&B chart, number 36 on the Billboard Hot 100, and number 5 in Canada.

The group recorded a follow-up single called "Slop Time" (to accompany a dance called The Slop), but the record did not sell as well. An album titled At the Hop with the Sherrys followed early in 1963 on Guyden Records; most of the songs on it were written by Madara and White. The group faded in the US but became popular in Europe, where they toured twice. Butler eventually settled in Sweden, where she married Svenne Hedlund, and formed the duo Svenne & Lotta, that became a famous act throughout Scandinavia during the 1970s and 1980s.

== Members ==
- Delphine Cook
- Dinell Cook
- Charlotte Butler
- Dolores "Honey" Wylie-Sowell
