= Dialoghi del presente =

Studio album by Luciano Cilio
- Released: 1977
- Genre: Classical
- Length: 29:45
- Label: EMI

Dialoghi del presente (Dialogues of the Present) is the debut and sole album by Italian composer Luciano Cilio.

== Release ==
Originally released by EMI in 1977, Dialoghi del presente was reissued under the title Dell'universo assente (The Absent Universe) by the label Die Schachtel in 2004. The release includes his only album released during his lifetime, Dialoghi del presente (tracks 1–5), along with previously unreleased tracks recovered by Girolamo De Simone (tracks 6–11). Cilio's work was subsequently rediscovered, transcribed, and performed by De Simone, and liner notes on the re-release were provided by Jim O'Rourke. O'Rourke compares Cilio’s music to artists such as Nick Drake, Bill Fay, This Heat, Popol Vuh, and Arvo Pärt.

== Track listing ==
All tracks are written by Luciano Cilio.

No.	Title	Length
1.	"Primo quadro "della conoscenza""	7:56
2.	"Secondo quadro"	5:18
3.	"Terzo quadro"	2:14
4.	"Quarto quadro "dell'universo Assente""	8:50
5.	"Interludio"	5:27
Total length:		29:45

== Personnel ==
- Luciano Cilio - guitar, flute, bass, mandolin
- Patrizia Lopez - vocals
- Elio Lupi - cello
- Paolo De Simone - double bass
- Peppino Romito - oboe, English horn
- Toni Esposito - percussion
- Roberto Fix - soprano saxophone
- Peppo Cerciello - violin
- Renato Marengo - producer
