= En la Cumbre =

En La Cumbre

Studio album by Rigo Tovar
- Released: 1974
- Recorded: 1973–1974

Rigo Tovar chronology
Cómo Será La Mujer (1973)	En La Cumbre (1974)	En Acción (1975)

En La Cumbre is a studio album by Rigo Tovar and the band Costa Azul.

== Track listing ==
1. Recordando Monterrey
2. Cuando Tu Cariño
3. La Mucura
4. Me Voy a Perder
5. El Parrandero Enamorado
6. Noche de Cumbia
7. Mi Amiga, Mi Esposa y Mi Amante
8. Mi Tinajita
9. Palmeras
10. Yo No Fui
