= Pirulín =

Type of candy

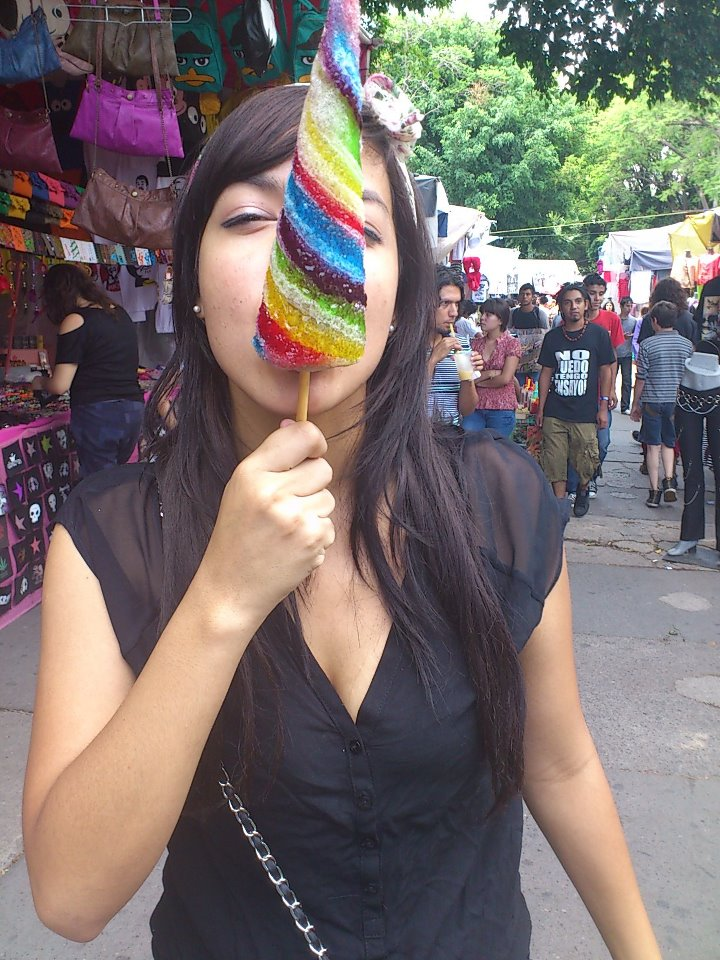
- A Mexican woman during a festival, holding a big pirulí candy
- Alternative names: Pico dulce, pirulí, chupirul
- Type: Confectionery

A pirulín (also known as pirulí) is a multicolor, conic-shaped lollipop of about 10 to 15 cm long, with a sharp conical or pyramidal point, with a stick in the base, and wrapped in cellophane.

In Argentina, Colombia, and Cuba, this hard candy used to be very popular and sold in the streets and squares by a pirulinero, who are considered a form of peddlers specializing in the candy. Nowadays, it is most commonly found in certain supermarkets specializing in sweets and in a few "kioscos".

José Arechavaleta is credited with the invention of pirulí.

Other names for pirulín:

- Bolivia: pirulo.
- Chile: pico dulce.
- Guatemala: chupete.
- Mexico: pirulí or chupirul (the latter name is a result of the success of the trademark used by Luxus).

== See also ==
- Chupa Chups, Spanish confectionery brand
- Torrespaña, a television tower nicknamed "Pirulí" in Madrid, Spain.
- Víctor Yturbe, a Mexican singer, nicknamed "El Pirulí".
