= Eternally (Charlie Chaplin song) =

1952 song composed by Charlie Chaplin for the film called Limelight

"Eternally" is a song with music by Charlie Chaplin, and words by the English lyricists Geoff Parsons and John Turner. The music was initially composed for Chaplin's film Limelight (1952) and titled "Terry's Theme"; the film won an Oscar for "Best Original Dramatic Score" at the 45th Academy Awards in 1973.

== "Terry's Theme" ==
External audio
- You may hear an arrangement of "Terry's Theme" by John Serry performed in 1956 Here on Archive.org

As "Terry's Theme", the tune was a charting instrumental hit in 1953 for Frank Chacksfield (UK number 2, US number 5), arranged by Leon Young. Other instrumental versions issued the same year included Ron Goodwin (UK number 3), and Richard Hayman (US number 13).

== "Eternally" ==
As "Eternally", it was recorded by Jimmy Young (UK number 8, 1953), Vic Damone (US number 12, 1953), Li Xianglan (in Chinese and Japanese), Petula Clark (These Are My Songs, 1967), Bing Crosby (for his radio show), Dinah Shore, Steve Lawrence, Michel Legrand, Jerry Vale, Sarah Vaughan, Roger Whittaker, Engelbert Humperdinck (1973 and 2007), Victor Wood (1971), Amália Rodrigues, John Serry Sr. (Squeeze Play, 1956), among many others.

== "Candilejas" ==
Brazilian singer José Augusto recorded Portuguese and Spanish language versions of the song. The Spanish version, titled "Candilejas", topped the charts in Mexico in 1974, and was later performed by Roberto Carlos, Julio Iglesias and Plácido Domingo.

== See also ==
- List of number-one hits of 1974 (Mexico)
