= Matamoros Querido =

Studio album by Rigo Tovar
- Released: 1972
- Recorded: 1971–1972
- Length: 36:50
- Label: Melody

Rigo Tovar chronology
| Matamoros Querido (1972) | Como Sera la Mujer (1973) |

Matamoros Querido is the first album by Rigo Tovar. It was recorded in Houston, Texas. The cover photograph was taken in the museum district of Houston, in front of the Mecom Fountains. The album contains two of his most popular songs, "Matamoros Querido" and "Lamento de Amor".

The album is dedicated to Tovar's hometown of Matamoros, Tamaulipas.

== Track listing ==
1. Mi Matamoros Querido (Rigo Tovar)
2. Lamento de Amor (Rigo Tovar)
3. Celos de Luna (Luis Vazquez)
4. Paloma Mensajera (Julian Venegas)
5. Rio Rebelde (Cholo Aguirre, Roberto Uballes)
6. Rosa Valencia (Rigo Tovar)
7. No Son Palabritas (Heleno)
8. Carta de Recuerdo (Julio Erazo)
9. Vereda Tropical (Gonzalo Curiel)
10. Gracias (Rigo Tovar)
11. La Calandria Canta (Rigo Tovar)
12. Verano en Veracruz (Peraza, Ismael Flores)
