= Ma Baker =

1977 single by Boney M.

Single by Boney M.

from the album Love for Sale
- B-side: "Still I'm Sad"
- Released: May 1977
- Genre: Disco
- Length: 4:51 (first 7-inch version); 4:36 (album and single version)
- Label: Hansa
- Composers: Original melody: based on "Sidi Mansour" (traditional Tunisian folk song); Rearrangement: Frank Farian, George Reyam
- Lyricist: Fred Jay
- Producer: Frank Farian

Boney M. singles chronology
"Sunny" (1976)	"Ma Baker" (1977)	"Belfast" (1977)

Audio video
- "Ma Baker (ZDF Starparade 02.06.1977)" on YouTube

"Ma Baker" is a song by disco group Boney M., released as a single in 1977. It was the first single off their second album Love for Sale and their third consecutive chart-topper in (West) Germany. The song tells of a criminal called Ma Baker, who is described throughout the song as the "meanest cat" in Chicago for her callousness.

The song was a huge success in Europe and Latin America, topping the charts in many countries there. It was a number 2 hit in the UK (only surpassed by Donna Summer's "I Feel Love"). In the US, the song only reached number 96.

== Composition and structure ==
Frank Farian's assistant Hans-Jörg Mayer discovered a popular Tunisian folkloric song, "Sidi Mansour" while on holiday, and rewrote the song into a disco track.

The lyrics by Fred Jay were inspired by the told story of 1930s US outlaw Ma Barker, although the name was changed into "Ma Baker" because "it sounded better".

With a structure similar to Boney M.'s breakthrough single "Daddy Cool", using the same gimmick percussion, alternating answer-back vocals, and a spoken mid-part, the song opened with a snarling "Freeze, I'm Ma Baker, put your hands in the air and gimme all your money". Although it has never been officially credited, the voice was that of Linda Blake, the wife of Frank Farian's American friend Bill Swisher, who was a soldier in West Germany at the time. Bill Swisher performed the spoken mid-part, announcing a bulletin from the FBI. He was used on several later Boney M. recordings, including "Rasputin" and "El Lute".

Farian re-recorded the song with Milli Vanilli in 1988, and reused both spoken voiceovers from the original song in the cover. Boney M.'s version was remixed the same year, 1993 and again in 1998. The song has been covered a number of times, including Banda R-15 and Knorkator. The "ma ma ma ma" chorus vocals were also sampled in Lady Gaga's "Poker Face".

== Charts ==
=== Weekly charts ===
Chart (1977–1978)	Peak position
Argentina	4
Australia (Kent Music Report)	5
Austria (Ö3 Austria Top 40)	1
Belgium (Ultratop 50 Flanders)	1
Canada Top Singles (RPM)	50
Europe (Eurochart Hot 100)	1
Finland (Suomen Virallinen)	2
France (IFOP)	1
Germany (GfK)	1
Ireland (IRMA)	4
Italy (Musica e dischi)	2
Mexico	1
Netherlands (Dutch Top 40)	1
Netherlands (Single Top 100)	1
New Zealand (Recorded Music NZ)	2
Norway (VG-lista)	1
Portugal	2
South Africa (Springbok Radio)	2
Spain (AFE)	1
Sweden (Sverigetopplistan)	1
Switzerland (Schweizer Hitparade)	1
UK Singles (Official Charts)	2
US Billboard Hot 100	96
US Billboard Hot Disco Singles	31

=== Year-end charts ===
Chart (1977)	Position
Australia (Kent Music Report)	24
Austria (Ö3 Austria Top 40)	3
Belgium (Ultratop 50 Flanders)	1
France (IFOP)	8
Germany (Media Control Charts)	2
Netherlands (Dutch Top 40)	1
Netherlands (Single Top 100)	2
Switzerland (Schweizer Hitparade)	7

== Sales and certifications ==
Region	Certification	Certified units/sales
France	—	700,000
Germany (BVMI)	Gold	500,000^{^}
Netherlands	—	250,000
New Zealand (RMNZ)	Gold	15,000^{‡}
Sweden (GLF)	Gold	25,000^{^}
United Kingdom (BPI)	Gold	500,000^{^}
^{^} Shipments figures based on certification alone.^{‡} Sales+streaming figures based on certification alone.

== 1993 remix ==
"Ma Baker" (Remix '93)

Single by Boney M.

from the album More Gold – 20 Super Hits Vol. II
- Released: 1993
- Label: BMG (FRG)

Boney M. singles chronology
"Brown Girl in the Ring" (Remix) (1993)	"Ma Baker" (Remix '93) (1993)	"Papa Chico" (1994)

Following the remix of "Brown Girl in the Ring", Farian remixed "Ma Baker" in 1993. While a modest club hit, it failed to enter the European charts. "Borsalino" and "The Most Wanted Woman" are two dub mixes of the track. The new remix was included in the compilation album More Gold - 20 Super Hits Vol. II.

=== Germany ===
==== 12" ====
- "Ma Baker (Remix '93)" (BMG 74321 15940 1, 1993)

Side A – Gangster

1. "Ma Baker (Remix '93)" (Bonnie & Clyde mix) – 5:25
2. "The Most Wanted Woman" – 3:30

Side B – Fashion

1. "Borsalino (Trainee Mix)" – 4:55
2. "Ma Baker (Remix '93)" (Radio Edit) – 3:58

==== CD ====
- "Ma Baker (Remix '93)" (BMG 74321 15940 2, 1993)
1. "Ma Baker (Remix '93)" (Radio Edit) – 3:58
2. "Ma Baker (Remix '93)" (Bonnie & Clyde mix) – 5:25
3. "Borsalino (Trainee Mix)" – 4:55
4. "The Most Wanted Woman" – 3:30

== 1998 remix ==
"Ma Baker"

Single by Boney M. vs. Sash!
- Released: 1998 / April 1999 (UK)
- Length: 3:24 (Tokapi radio edit)
- Label: Lautstark; Logic
- Songwriters: Frank Farian; George Reyam; Fred Jay
- Producer: Tokapi

Boney M. singles chronology
"Papa Chico" (1994)	"Ma Baker" (1998)	"Daddy Cool" (Remix) (1999)

Sash! singles chronology
"Move Mania" (1998)	"Ma Baker" (1998)	"Colour the World" (1998)

In 1998, a new remix of "Ma Baker" by German production team Sash! started to chart as a 12-inch single. Just as the CD single was about to follow, it was withdrawn, and a new version appeared, re-titled "Somebody Scream! Ma Baker" featuring Horny United. The single was a top-30 hit in Germany, the Netherlands, Belgium, Switzerland. In Finland, New Zealand, and Sweden, it entered the top 10. When released in the UK in April, it peaked at no. 22. The accompanying video featured a young woman, kickboxing, training with a gun, the only relation to the original group being her watching the original 1977 video of "Ma Baker" on a TV set.

=== Charts ===
==== Weekly charts ====
Weekly chart performance for Sash!'s remix
Chart (1998–1999)	Peak position
Austria (Ö3 Austria Top 40)	19
Belgium (Ultratop 50 Flanders)	24
Belgium (Ultratop 50 Wallonia)	23
Canada Dance/Urban (RPM)	4
Finland (Suomen virallinen lista)	6
France (SNEP)	11
Germany (GfK)	28
Netherlands (Dutch Top 40)	26
Netherlands (Single Top 100)	34
New Zealand (Recorded Music NZ)	9
Poland Airplay (Music & Media)	3
Sweden (Sverigetopplistan)	10
Switzerland (Schweizer Hitparade)	21
UK Singles (Official Charts)	22

==== Year-end charts ====
Annual chart rankings for Sash! remix
Chart (1999)	Position
Belgium (Ultratop 50 Wallonia)	97
Canada Dance/Urban (RPM)	35
Europe Border Breakers (Music & Media)	38
France (SNEP)	56
Sweden (Hitlistan)	61

== In popular culture ==
The song is featured in the final episode of the sixth series of the television show Black Mirror, in which the demon character takes on the appearance of Boney M. member Bobby Farrell. The episode in general was called "Demon 79" originally aired on 15 June 2023.

== See also ==
- List of Dutch Top 40 number-one singles of 1977
- List of European number-one hits of 1977
- List of number-one singles of 1977 (France)
- List of number-one hits of 1977 (Germany)
- List of number-one hits of 1977 (Mexico)
- List of number-one singles of 1977 (Spain)
- List of number-one singles and albums in Sweden
- List of number-one singles from 1968 to 1979 (Switzerland)
- VG-lista 1964 to 1994
