= Bradley Smith Company =

American confectionery company associated with the "Lolly Pop" trademark

- Trade name: Bradley Smith Candy Company
- Company type: Private (historical)
- Industry: Confectionery
- Founded: 1892 (as reported by later historical accounts)
- Founder: (attributed in sources to George P. Smith; partnership details vary by source)
- Fate: Bankrupt/ceased original operations during the Great Depression (as reported); name later used by a successor distributor/packager (as reported)
- Headquarters: New Haven, Connecticut, United States
- Products: Hard candy, chocolates, molasses confections; "Lolly Pop" (hard candy on a stick)
- Brands: "Lolly Pop" (trademark registered 1931)

The Bradley Smith Company (also referred to in sources as the Bradley Smith Candy Company) was a confectionery business based in New Haven, Connecticut, known for its early 20th-century production and national distribution of hard candy on a stick marketed as the "Lolly Pop". The U.S. Patent and Trademark Office registered the "Lolly Pop" name to the company on October 13, 1931, after a lengthy dispute over whether the term was already in use in English. Although the company helped standardize and popularize the modern form, multiple accounts emphasize that both the concept of sweets on sticks and the word "lollipop/lollypop" existed earlier in Europe and the United States.

== History ==
Later historical writing describes the Bradley Smith candy business as having been founded in 1892 and identifies George P. Smith as a co-owner associated with its growth and its signature candy-on-a-stick products. A separate account in the Yale Daily News refers to Smith's business partner as Andrew Bradley, though other summaries focus primarily on Smith and the company name rather than detailing ownership structure.

The company operated in New Haven and is associated in multiple accounts with a facility on Grand Avenue in the city's Wooster Square area. A New Haven Building Archive entry documents mid-20th-century occupancy at/around 832 Grand Avenue by a "Bradley Smith Confectioners Company" through 1984 and states that the business later shifted toward wholesale distribution, indicating continuity of the name beyond the original manufacturing era described in earlier accounts.

== "Lolly Pop" and the modern lollipop ==
=== Product development and inspiration ===
According to ConnecticutHistory.org, the company began producing its first "Lolly Pops" in 1908, and Smith was later credited as the first to apply the term to hard candy on a stick in the modern American sense. The same account states that Smith drew inspiration from a West Haven confection called Reynolds Taffy (described as a chocolate caramel taffy on a stick) and adapted the "on a stick" idea to hard candy production.

A longer narrative history in the Daily Nutmeg places the company's hard-candy-on-a-stick innovation earlier, stating that by 1902 the company was putting hard candy on wooden rods and marketing a product line called "Yale Lolly Pops." Because these timelines differ, some historians interpret the discrepancy as reflecting changes in product naming, scale, or documentation between early experiments and later mass production under the "Lolly Pop" name.

ConnecticutHistory.org reports that the name "Lolly Pop" was popularly associated with a racehorse Smith had seen at a local fair. A Connecticut television segment likewise summarized the origin story as borrowing the name from a prize-winning horse and described a decades-long effort to secure exclusive rights to the term.

=== Manufacturing and mechanization ===
ConnecticutHistory.org describes early production methods as manual: workers cut warm hard candy and inserted ("pegged") sticks by hand, flattening the candy in the process. The same account credits a company foreman, Max Buchmuller (also spelled Buchmüller), with inventing and patenting a machine that inserted sticks into candy molds, enabling continuous production. It reports an initial machine output of about 125 units per minute, increasing through later improvements to as many as 750 per minute, with products shipped nationally and internationally, including to England and China, and sold for a penny in early years.

Sources differ on the precise year of Buchmuller's patent activity: the Daily Nutmeg states that by 1909 he submitted a patent for a machine that shaped the candy and inserted sticks, while a later news summary reported that the stick-inserting machine was patented in 1914.

== Trademark and terminology ==
ConnecticutHistory.org states that the Bradley Smith Company sought trademark protection beginning in 1908, but the Patent Office initially rejected the application after locating an early 19th-century English dictionary definition describing a "lollipop" as a hard sweet (sometimes on a stick). The same source reports that the company ultimately secured registration for the spelling "Lolly Pop" on October 13, 1931, after arguing that the spacing/spelling and first use were distinctive. Over time, "Lolly Pop" and "lollipop" were used interchangeably by competitors and consumers, and ConnecticutHistory.org concludes that the term became so universal that the trademark could not be maintained in the long run.

== Products and public reception ==
A modern retrospective states that, in addition to its stick candies, the company sold other confections including hard candies without sticks, chocolates, and molasses-based sweets, and (in earlier years) cigars. The same article notes contemporaneous concerns about low-cost penny candy and reports that the company publicly offered a reward in 1914 for proof that its Lolly Pops contained poison; it also reports a 1912 federal action involving arsenic found in the glaze of a separate candy product ("London Cream").

== Decline, successors, and legacy ==
A 2011 Yale Daily News feature states that the Bradley Smith Company went bankrupt during the Great Depression, ceased operations, and lost its trademark, leaving "lollipop" in the public domain. The Daily Nutmeg similarly reports that the firm struggled and went out of business, then describes a re-formed business in 1938 that functioned as a candy distributor/packager and survived until 1984. A Connecticut business registry listing shows a corporate entity named "Bradley Smith Company, Incorporated" registered in Connecticut in August 1938 with a mailing address on Grand Avenue, consistent with the existence of a successor company using the historic name.

In 2024, Connecticut enacted legislation designating the lollipop as the state's official candy, and local reporting tied the designation to George Smith and the Grand Avenue operation associated with the Bradley Smith Company.

== See also ==
- Lollipop
- New Haven, Connecticut
- Confectionery
