= List of number-one hits of 1974 (Mexico) =

This is a list of the songs that reached number one in Mexico in 1974, according to Núcleo Radio Mil as published in the Billboard and Notitas Musicales magazines. Also included are the number-one songs according to the Record World magazine.

== Chart history (Billboard) ==
Issue date	Song	Artist(s)	Label	Ref.
January 26	"Let Me Get To Know You"	Paul Anka	Gamma	
February 16	"Let Me Get To Know You"	Paul Anka	Gamma	
March 2	"Let Me Get To Know You"	Paul Anka	Gamma	
March 23	"Déjenme si estoy llorando"	Los Ángeles Negros	Capitol	
March 30	"Déjenme si estoy llorando"	Los Ángeles Negros	Capitol	
April 6	"Déjenme si estoy llorando"	Los Ángeles Negros	Capitol	
April 13	"Déjenme si estoy llorando"	Los Ángeles Negros	Capitol	
April 20	"Let Me Get To Know You"	Paul Anka / José José (Note: His version of the song was titled "Déjame conocerte".)	Gamma / RCA	
May 11	"Let Me Get To Know You"	Paul Anka / José José	Gamma / RCA	
June 1	"Let Me Get To Know You"	Paul Anka / José José	Gamma / RCA	
July 6	"Me gusta estar contigo"	Angélica María	Sonido Internacional	
July 13	"Me gusta estar contigo"	Angélica María	Sonido Internacional	
July 27	"Espejismo"	Juanello	Epic	
August 3	"Espejismo"	Juanello	Epic	
August 10	"Espejismo"	Juanello	Epic	
August 17	"Cómo sufro"	Los Baby's	Peerless	
August 31	"Cómo sufro"	Los Baby's	Peerless	
September 7	"Cómo sufro"	Los Baby's	Peerless	
September 14	"Cómo sufro"	Los Baby's	Peerless	
September 28	"Espejismo"	Juanello	Epic	
October 5	"Amada amante"	Roberto Carlos	CBS	
November 23	"Candilejas"	José Augusto	Capitol	
December 7	"Candilejas"	José Augusto	Capitol	
December 26	"Mi plegaria"	César	Capitol	

=== By country of origin ===
Number-one artists:

Country of origin	Number of artists	Artists
Mexico	3	José José
Mexico	3	Juanello
Mexico	3	Los Baby's
Brazil	2	José Augusto
Brazil	2	Roberto Carlos
Canada	1	Paul Anka
Chile	1	Los Ángeles Negros
Guatemala	1	César
United States	1	Angélica María

Number-one compositions (it denotes the country of origin of the song's composer[s]; in case the song is a cover of another one, the name of the original composition is provided in parentheses):

Country of origin	Number of compositions	Compositions
Mexico	4	"Cómo sufro"
Mexico	4	"Espejismo"
Mexico	4	"Me gusta estar contigo"
Mexico	4	"Mi plegaria"
Brazil	2	"Amada amante"
Brazil	2	"Déjenme si estoy llorando" ("Quando eu estiver chorando")
Canada	1	"Let Me Get To Know You"
United Kingdom	1	"Candilejas" ("Eternally")

== Chart history (Record World) ==
Issue date	Song	Artist(s)	Ref.
January 19	"Zacazonapan"	Antonio Zamora	
February 9	"Cebollitas verdes"	Los Baby's	
April 6	"Libre como gaviota"	Manoella Torres	
May 11	"La novia fea"	Conjunto Acapulco Tropical	
May 25	"Déjame conocerte"	José José	
June 7	"Perdóname"	Estrellita	
June 22	"Perdóname"	Estrellita	
August 10	"Cómo sufro"	Los Baby's	
September 14	"Cómo sufro"	Los Baby's	
November 2	"El rey"	José Alfredo Jiménez	
November 23	"Que seas mi condena"	Juan Gabriel	
December 14	"¿Por qué no fui tu amigo?"	Los Astros	

== See also ==
- 1974 in music

== Sources ==
- Print editions of the Billboard and Record World magazines.
