= Estrellita (singer) =

- Born: Isabel Rincón Bautista; 6 May 1949 (age 76); Seville, Andalusia, Spain
- Genres: Latin ballad, flamenco, mariachi
- Occupations: Singer; actress
- Years active: 1962–1979
- Labels: Cisne-Raff; Ariola
- Spouse: Hugo Kiese

Isabel Rincón Bautista (born 6 May 1949), known professionally as Estrellita, is a Spanish singer and actress. She began her career in Spanish musical films and also achieved success as a singer in Mexico, where she had four top 10 hit singles: "Perdóname" (1974), "Quién te dijo que te quiero" (1974), "Dónde andará" (1975), and "Con la pasión más grande" (1975).

== Biography ==
Born in the San Jerónimo neighborhood of Seville, Spain, Rincón was discovered by film producers in the Seville Fair. She was renamed "Estrellita" ("Little Star" in Spanish) and cast in the leading roles of two Spanish films, Su alteza la niña (1962) and Han robado una estrella (1963). By April 1963, she had promoted her films with live performances in Puerto Rico, Venezuela, and New York City.

A decade later, Estrellita relocated to Mexico, where she had a top 10 hit in July 1974 with the song "Perdóname". That same month, she won the 1974 Record World Annual Award for Female Singer of Greatest Projection in Mexico. In August, her second Cisne-Raff single, "Quién te dijo que te quiero", also became a top 10 hit in Mexico.

In February 1975, she had her third top 10 hit in Mexico with her cover version of Juan Gabriel's "Dónde andará". In May, she had her fourth top 10 hit single with "Con la pasión más grande". She recorded several more hit singles and albums for the Mexican record label Cisne-Raff.

In July 1975, Estrellita won the Record World International Latin Award for Top Ballad Singer (Female) and the Record World Annual Award for Best Romantic Singer (Female) in Mexico. In August, Cisne-Raff awarded Estrellita a gold record for the "huge sales [she] achieved during the 1974-1975 season".

In January 1976, Mexico's Record Reviewers Association (Asociación de Comentaristas de Discos ) named her the "best romantic singer of boleros". That same year, she played a starring role opposite Mexican singer-songwriter Juan Gabriel in the film En esta primavera, which was released in 1979.

Estrellita married Paraguayan footballer Hugo Kiese, who played for Mexico City's Club América.

== Filmography ==
- Su alteza la niña (1962)
- Han robado una estrella (1963)
- Los caciques (1975)
- En esta primavera (1979)

== Discography ==
- Por creer en ti (1973)
- Perdóname (1976)
- En algún lugar (1977)
- Si no te amase (1978)
