= Beautiful Rose =

Single by George Baker Selection
- Songwriter: Hans Bouwens

"Beautiful Rose" is a 1977 hit song written by Hans Bouwens, performed by the Dutch band George Baker Selection, which was No.1 on the all-Europe pop chart European Hot 100 Singles. It was taken from the album Summer Melody.

== Charts ==
=== Weekly charts ===
Chart (1977)	Peak position
Belgium (Ultratop 50 Flanders)	3
Belgium (Ultratop 50 Wallonia)	46
Netherlands (Dutch Top 40)	3
Netherlands (Single Top 100)	4
Switzerland (Schweizer Hitparade)	8
West Germany (GfK)	24

=== Year-end charts ===
Chart (1977)	Position
Belgium (Ultratop Flanders)	23
Netherlands (Dutch Top 40)	32
Netherlands (Single Top 100)	44
