= Luciano Cilio =

Italian composer and musician

- Born: 1950; Naples, Italy
- Died: 21 May 1983 (aged 32–33); Milan, Italy
- Occupations: Composer and musician

Luciano Cilio (1950 – 21 May 1983) was an Italian composer and musician.

Born in Naples, Cilio was trained in both architecture and music. In the early 1970s, he became involved with Italy’s progressive rock and experimental theater scenes. He collaborated with musicians such as Alan Sorrenti and Shawn Phillips.

Cilio recorded and released an album of minimalist music, Dialoghi del presente, in 1977. The album is organized as a suite of four movements plus an interlude, and uses instruments such as acoustic guitar, mandolin, strings, piano, woodwinds, voice, and percussion. An expanded version of the album, entitled Dell'Universo Assente was released in 2004, performed by Girolamo De Simone and featuring liner notes by Jim O’Rourke. O'Rourke cites De Simone as responsible for rediscovering Cilio's work, and draws comparisons to artists such as Nick Drake, Bill Fay, This Heat, Popol Vuh, and Arvo Pärt.

One of his pieces, "Della Conoscenza", is featured on No. 18 of The Wire magazine's long-running series of CD compilations The Wire Tapper.

He died in Milan by his own hand at the age of 33.
