= Panabá =

Town in the Mexican state of Yucatán

- Municipal Seat
- Location within Yucatán (state)
- Coordinates: 21°17′47″N 88°16′14″W
- Country: Mexico
- State: Yucatán
- Municipality: Panabá

Area
  - Total: 1.91 km^{2} (0.74 sq mi)
- Elevation: 19 m (62 ft)

Population (2010)
  - Total: 5,232
- Time zone: UTC-6 (Central Standard Time)
- Postal code (of seat): 96710
- Area code: 986
- INEGI code: 310570001

Panabá is a town and the municipal seat of the Panabá Municipality, Yucatán in Mexico.
