= Lollipop =

Type of candy, usually hard and mounted on a stick

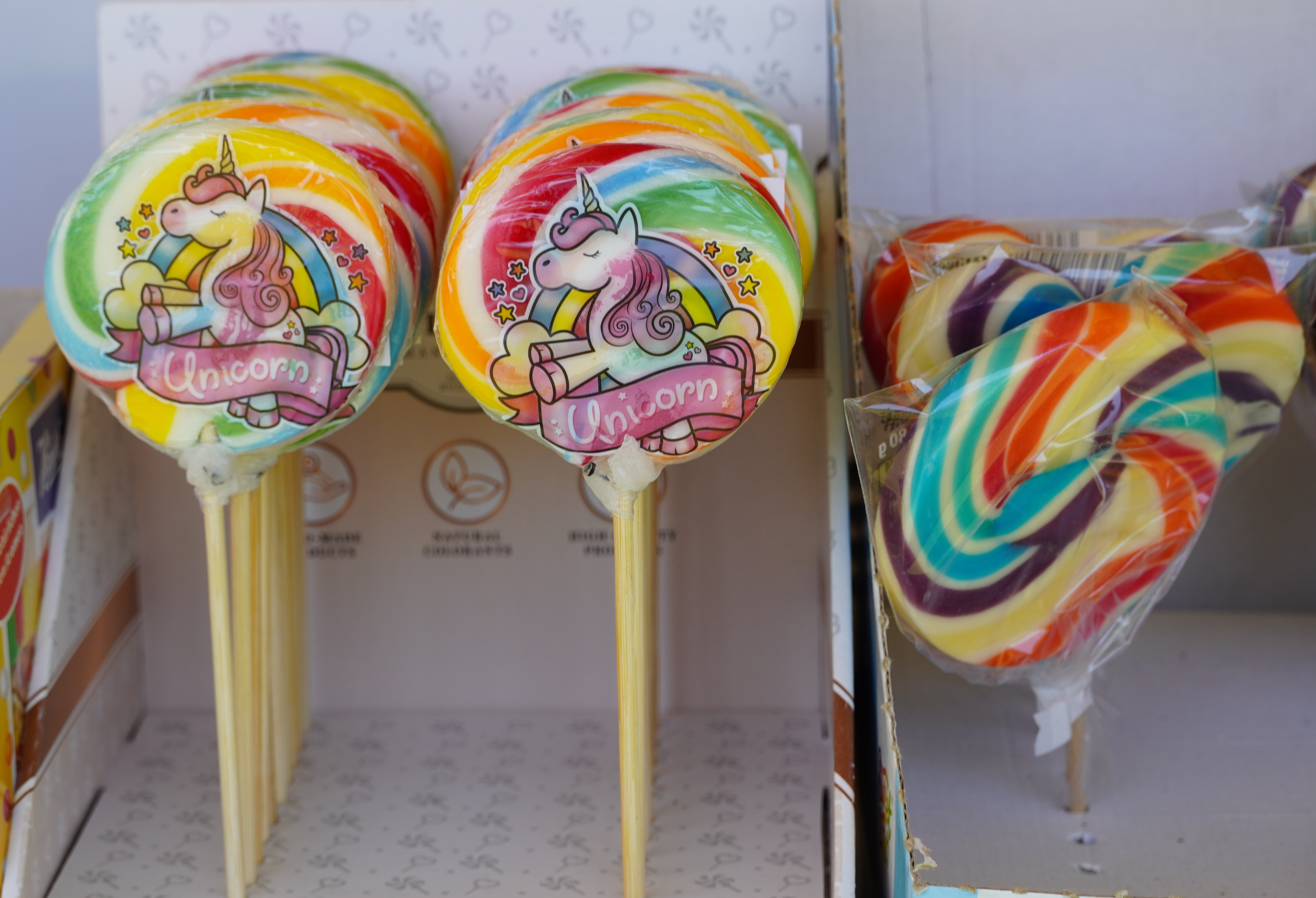
- Rainbow lollipops
- Alternative names: Lolly, sucker
- Type: Confectionery
- Main ingredients: Sucrose, corn syrup, flavoring
- Variations: Ice pops

A lollipop is a type of sugar candy usually consisting of hard candy mounted on a stick and intended for sucking or licking. Different informal terms are used in different places, including lolly and sucker. Lollipops are available in many flavors and shapes.

== Types ==
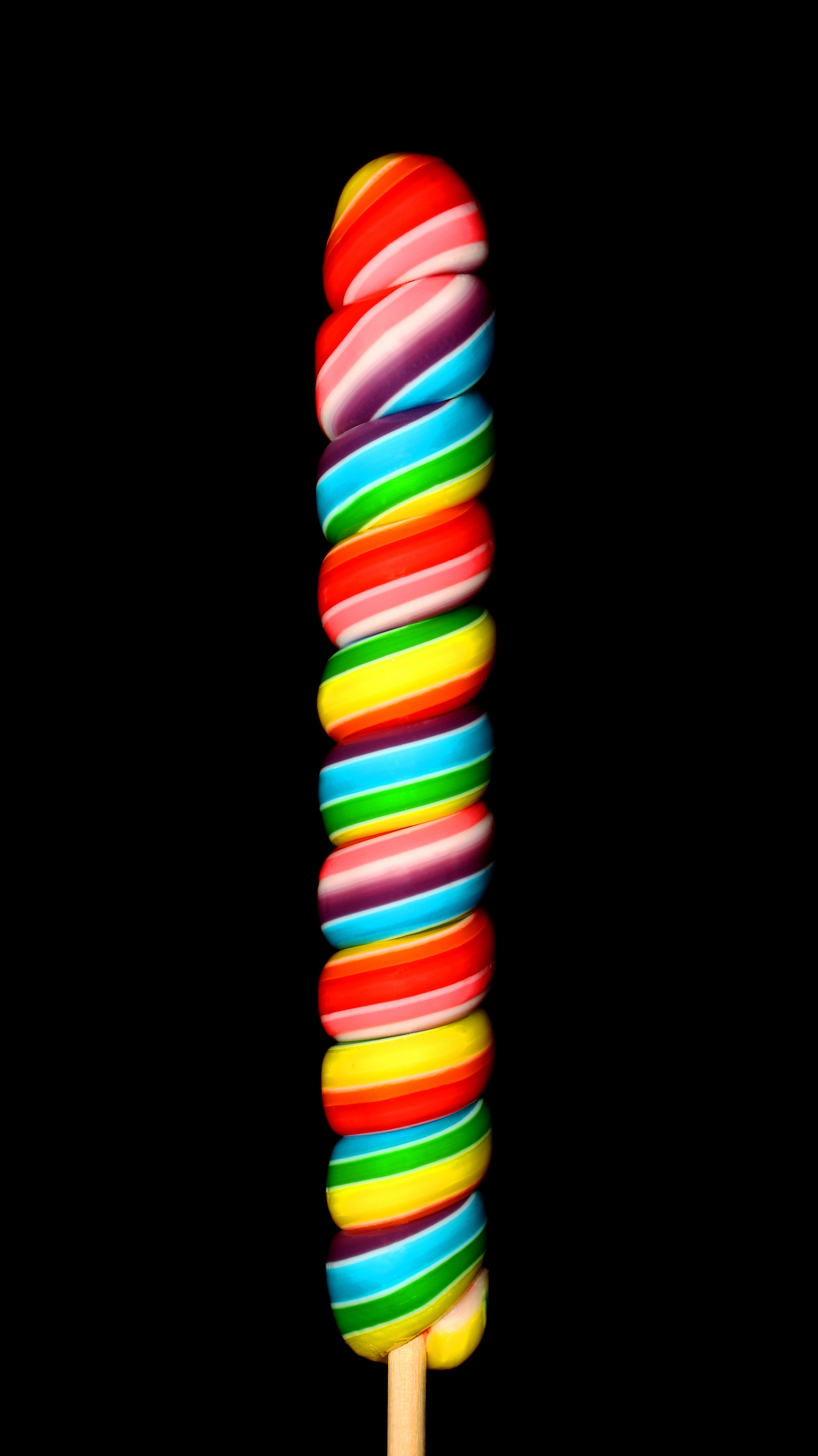
Spiral type with multi-color

Lollipops are available in several colors and flavors, particularly fruit flavors. Numerous companies produce lollipops in dozens of flavors and many different shapes. They can range from very small candies bought in bulk and given away as a courtesy at banks, barbershops, and other locations to very large treats made from candy canes twisted into a spiral shape.

Most lollipops are eaten at room temperature, but "ice lollipops", "ice lollies", or "popsicles" are frozen water-based lollipops. Some lollipops contain fillings, such as bubble gum or soft candy. Some novelty lollipops have more unusual items, such as mealworm larvae, embedded in the candy. Other novelty lollipops have non-edible centers, such as a flashing light embedded within the candy; there is also a trend, principally in North America, of lollipops with sticks attached to a motorized device that makes the candy spin around in one's mouth.

In the Nordic countries, Germany, and the Netherlands, some lollipops are flavored with salmiak.

=== Medicinal use ===
Lollipops can be used to carry medicines.

Some lollipops have been marketed for use as diet aids, although their effectiveness is untested, and anecdotal cases of weight loss may be due to the power of suggestion. Flavored lollipops containing medicine are intended to give children medicine without fuss.

Actiq is a potent analgesic lollipop whose active ingredient is fentanyl. Often, patients use large amounts of opioid pain medication and take Actiq on a handle in order to control breakthrough cancer pain.

== History ==
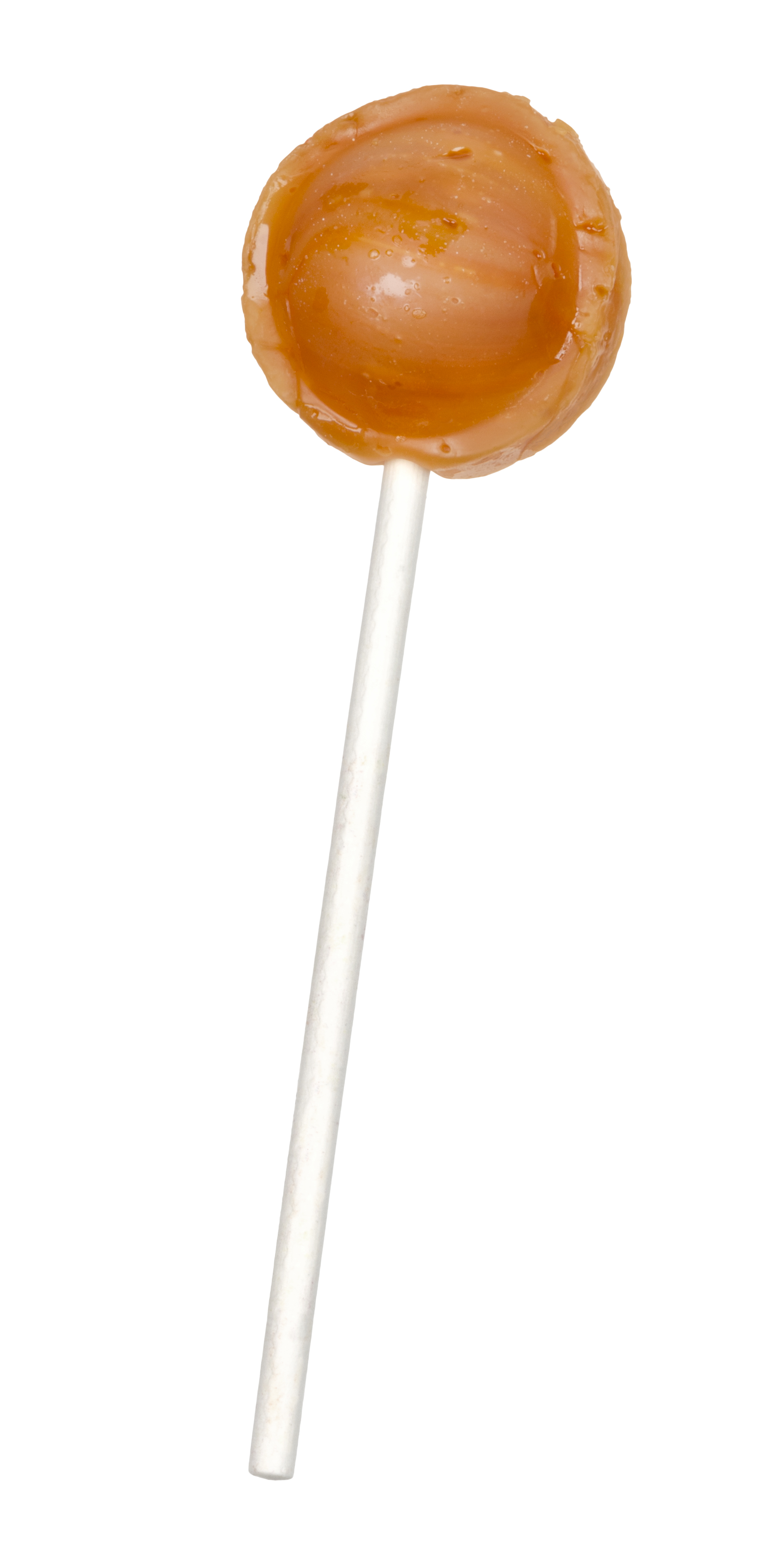
A Tootsie Pop

The idea of an edible candy on a stick is straightforward, and it is probable that the lollipop has been invented and reinvented numerous times. The first confections that closely resemble lollipops date back to the Middle Ages when the nobility would often eat boiled sugar with the aid of sticks or handles.

The invention of the modern lollipop is still a mystery, but many American companies in the early 20th century have laid claim to it. According to the book Food for Thought: Extraordinary Little Chronicles of the World, they were invented by George Smith of New Haven, Connecticut, who started making large hard candies mounted on sticks in 1908. He named them after a racehorse of the time, Lolly Pop—and trademarked the lollipop name in 1931.

English lexicographer Francis Grose recorded the term 'lollipop' in 1796. The term may have derived from the terms "lolly" (tongue) and "pop" (slap). The first references to the lollipop in its modern context date to the 1920s. Alternatively, it may be a word of Romani origin, related to the Roma tradition of selling candy apples on a stick. Red apple in the Romani language is loli phaba.

== Ingredients ==
The main ingredients in a standard lollipop are sugar and corn syrup. Sugars are fully hydrated carbon chains, meaning that there is a water molecule attached to each carbon. Sugars come in two forms: straight-chain and ring form. When sugars are in straight-chain form, aldehyde and ketone groups are open, which leaves them very susceptible to reaction. In this state, sugars are unstable. In ring form, sugars are stable and therefore exist in this form in most foods, including lollipops.

Sugar interacts differently depending on the presence of other ingredients and on various treatments. When heated enough to break the molecules apart, sugar generates a complex flavor, changes color, and creates a pleasing aroma. Sugar can form two types of solids in foods: crystalline and glassy amorphous. Glassy amorphous solids can be found in products such as lollipops, marshmallows, and caramels. Glassy amorphous solids result when moderate sugar concentrations (50% solutions) are heated to high temperatures, eliminating nearly all moisture. The final moisture content is around 1–2%, whereas the final moisture content in crystalline candies is 8–12%. The non-crystalline nature of glassy amorphous solids is due to the presence of inhibitors in the solution. Without an inhibitor, crystallization would occur spontaneously and rapidly as the sugar cools due to its high concentration. Some common inhibitors used in lollipop production are corn syrup, cream of tartar, honey, and butter.

In a lollipop, the moisture content falls to less than 2% at the end of the lollipop-making process; water is required at the start of the process. All other ingredients used in the process of lollipop production are optional. The use of inhibitors is dependent on the type of sugar used. The amount of inhibitor in the lollipop is usually small in comparison to the amount of sugar used. Additional flavors, colorings, and inclusions (like bubble gum or a Tootsie Roll) can be added to the final product but are not part of the main structure of a simple lollipop.

== Manufacturing ==
The formation and physical state of the glassy amorphous structure used in the creation of the lollipop are involved in a chemical process. The heating process is the first step in making lollipops after mixing the main ingredients. During heating, the molecules increase their translational mobility and resemble liquids. Although many hard candies are heated to about 310 °F (154 °C), the temperature that the solution is heated to is dependent on the specific volume and contents of the mixture. After heating is complete, the solution can then be cooled. The final cooled solution is supersaturated due to the moisture content dropping below 2%. Supersaturated or supercooled liquids are also formed due to inhibitors preventing crystallization. They are unstable because crystallization is a favored reaction in this case. During the cooling process, lollipops' most important physicochemical characteristic, the glass transition process, occurs.

== See also ==
- Bradley Smith Company
- Chupa Chups
- Clear toy candy
- Dum Dums
- Hard candy
- Pirulín
- Stick candy
- Tootsie Pops
- Whistle Pops
