= Los Baby's =

Los Baby´s
- Origin: Panabá, Yucatán, Mexico
- Genres: Rock and roll Rock en Español; Balada grupera
- Years active: 1959–present
- Labels: Discos Orfeón; Discos Peerless (principal)

Los Baby's are a rock and ballad band from Yucatán, Mexico. Their native town of Panabá is close to Mérida, the state capital.

== History ==
The group began performing together in 1958, at which time it was composed of the four Avila Aranda brothers. They debuted at the Fantasio theater in Mérida in 1960, then performed in Belize, where they took the name Los Baby's del Rock. They recorded their first sides for Discos Orfeón in 1959, but the label did not release them until 1962 once rock & roll began to become popular in Mexico. They toured throughout Mexico in the middle of the decade, and around this time they also made numerous appearances in television advertisements. In 1964, they made their first recordings for Discos Peerless, often covering the hits of foreign groups to great success. They became one of the most popular native pop acts in Mexico in the 1960s.

Their biggest success, however, came in the 70s, when they stopped covering foreign songs as they started to record their own songs. "¿Por qué?" and "Cómo sufro" were number-one hits in Mexico in 1972 and 1974 respectively. In 1986, the compilation 16 Exitos (16 Hits) charted in the United States, reaching #15 on the Billboard Regional Mexican chart.

Emilio and Armando died in the early 90s, but Carlos and Enrique still tour with Carlos Jr. on drums and guest keyboard and bass players.

== Discography ==
The group has released some 50 albums, mostly through the label Discos Peerless.

- Un Amor Imposible (1966)
- Pero yo no lo conozco (1966)
- Solo para enamorados (1967)
- Ritmo, Sabor y Sentimiento (1967)
- Sensación en Ritmo (1968)
- Cansancio (1968)
- Mi Loca Pasión (1969)
- Cariño (1970)
- Te vengo a decir adios (1970)
- Va Cayendo una Lágrima (1971)
- ¿Por qué? (1972)
- Sabotaje (1978)
- Amor Traicionero (1973)
- Como sufro (1974)
- Un viejo amor (1975)
- Morir contigo (1976)
- Regresa Ya (1977)
- Negrura (1980)
- Con Nuevos Éxitos (1981)
- Un Amor (1983)
- Tributo A Los Baby's (2017)

== Members ==
- Enrique Ávila Aranda (vocals)
- Carlos Ávila Aranda (guitar)
- Armando Ávila Aranda (bass, saxophone, vocals) (deceased)
- Emilio Ávila Aranda (drums) (deceased)
- Pablo Linares (electric organ, trumpet) (deceased)
- Geraldo Velazco (trumpet)
- José Manuel Escalante (keyboards)
- Sigfrido López (congas)
- Luis Vanegas (saxophone)
- Edgar Boffil 1973-1974 (organ)
- Miguel Zurita (keyboards)
- Rafaél Jiménez (bass)
- Pedro Gómez (teclados)

== See also ==
- List of best-selling Latin music artists
