= Víctor Yturbe =

Mexican singer (1936–1987)

- Born: Víctor Manuel De Anda Iturbe; May 8, 1936; Mexico City, Mexico
- Died: November 28, 1987 (aged 51); Atizapan de Zaragoza, State of Mexico, Mexico
- Cause of death: Gunshot wounds
- Occupation: Singer

Víctor Yturbe (born Víctor Manuel De Anda Iturbe; May 8, 1936 – November 28, 1987) was a Mexican singer under the stage name, "El Pirulí".

== Career ==
Yturbe was born in Mexico City. In the 1960s, he made his first contact with the artistic world, working as an aquatic clown in a water skiing show in Acapulco. In March 1964, after a spinal injury, he stayed in the Hotel Posada Vallarta where he started to sing professionally in the hotel's bar.

Victor sings to actress Veronica Castro in his song Veronica.

== Death ==
Yturbe was murdered on November 28, 1987, in Atizapan de Zaragoza. He was shot after he opened the door to his house. The cause was never established, and no one has ever been charged with his killing.

== See also ==
- List of unsolved murders (1980–1999)

== Albums ==
- 1988: Canta A Roberto Cantoral
- 1981: Ni Retiro Ni Regreso
- 1978: De Vez En Vez
- 1976: Noches En La Posada Vallarta
- 1976: Condición
- 1976: Por Si Acaso Me Recuerdas
- 1972: Simplemente
- 1972: Solo Para Adultos
- 1971: Te Pido Y Te Ruego
