= Lotta Hedlund =

American-Swedish singer (born 1944)

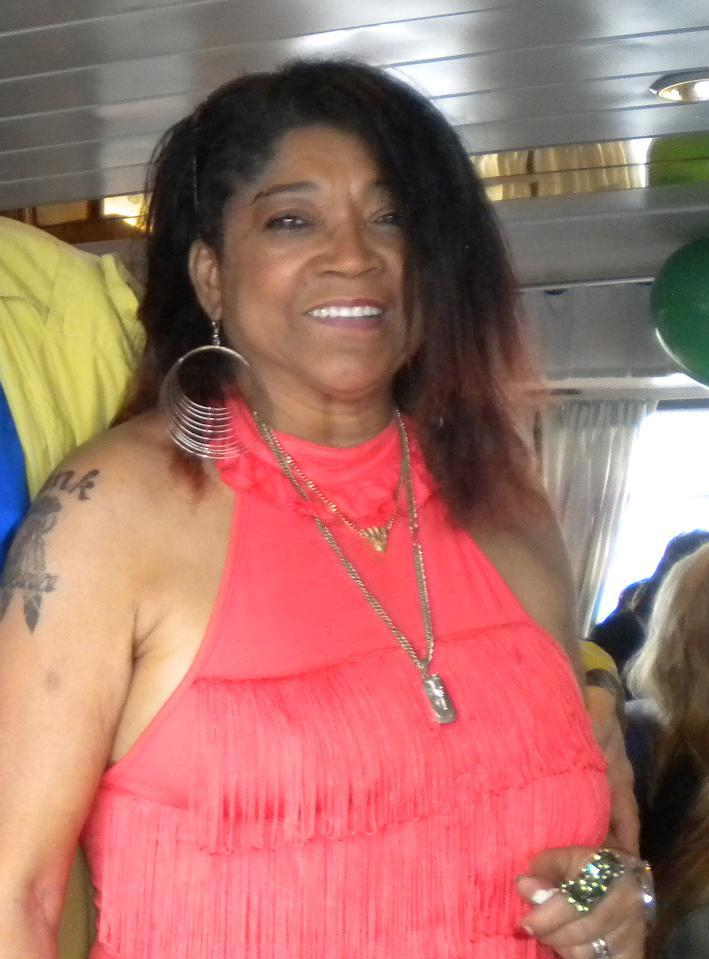

Background information
- Born: Charlotte Jean Butler; March 10, 1944 (age 82)
- Genres: Pop, Rock, Schlager
- Occupation: Singer

Charlotte Jean "Lotta" Hedlund (born Charlotte Jean Butler; March 10, 1944, later Charlotte Walker) is an American-Swedish singer who has been living in Sweden since the late 1960s.

== Life and career ==
She started her career in the girl-group Sherrys. The Sherrys toured Sweden with Swedish rock singer Jerry Williams, and after one of the gigs they met up with Hep Stars, Sweden's most successful group of the 1960s. One of the members was Benny Andersson (later of ABBA fame), another was Sven "Svenne" Hedlund – and they later wed. She joined her husband by becoming a member of Hep Stars and later as a singer duo Svenne & Lotta in the 1970s, called "Sven & Charlotte" in certain countries.

Svenne & Lotta competed in the Swedish heats for Eurovision Song Contest, Melodifestivalen, in 1975, with a song penned by the men of ABBA, called "Bang en boomerang", and also recorded the song in English and had a hit in several European countries with "Bang a boomerang". ABBA later covered the song as an album track. Svenne & Lotta went on to become one of the best selling groups of all times in Denmark, and even recorded a single in Danish.

Hedlund and her husband toured Sweden as a duo as well as solo artists until their divorce in 2014, and were considered a cult act.

== Discography – commercially available solo records ==
- "Bad Girl" (CD-single, 2007. Recorded in Philadelphia and Stockholm).

See also discographies of Sherrys, Hep Stars, Svenne & Lotta, Sven & Charlotte.

== Personal life ==
Hedlund was married to Swedish singer Svenne Hedlund (Sven Hedlund) from 1969 until they divorced in 2014 after 45 years of marriage.

She and her family live in Sävsjö in Småland in southern Sweden.
