= Alan Sorrenti =

Italian singer and composer

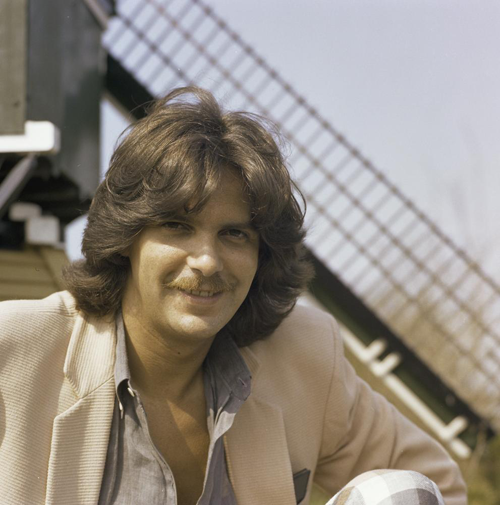
- Sorrenti in 1980

Background information
- Born: 9 December 1950 (age 75); Naples, Italy
- Occupations: singer; songwriter
- Years active: 1972–present

Alan Sorrenti (born 9 December 1950) is an Italian singer and composer.

== Biography ==
Sorrenti was born in Naples to Francesco, a painter and singer, and Gwendalin Thomas a Welsh traditional singer. Both he and his younger sister Jenny spent much of their childhood in Aberystwyth, Wales. As a result, he is fluent in both Italian and English and has sung in both languages throughout his career. Sorrenti's career began in the early 1970s; he released his first album, Aria, in 1972, followed by Come un vecchio incensiere all'alba di un villaggio deserto in 1973, both consisting mostly of progressive rock and experimental tracks.

In 1976, Alan Sorrenti shifted genre and released tracks more reminiscent of the dance genre. In late 1979 he scored a major European hit with the single "Tu sei l'unica donna per me", since then covered in a number of different languages.

Alan represented Italy in the Eurovision Song Contest 1980 with the song "Non so che darei". He finished sixth in the contest but the track became one of that year's bestselling entries in Continental Europe and Scandinavia after the winner Johnny Logan's "What's Another Year".

In 2006, Sorrenti participated in the festival O' Scià on the Lampedusa island.

Alan's younger sister Jenny Sorrenti is also a recording artist and has released two albums with her progressive folk/rock band Saint Just, as well as several solo albums.

== Discography ==
- Aria (1972)
- Come un vecchio incensiere all'alba di un villaggio deserto (1973)
- Alan Sorrenti (1974)
- Sienteme, it's time to land (1976)
- Figli delle Stelle (1977)
- L.A. & N.Y. (1979)
- Di notte (1980)
- Alan Sorrenti (1981) (Japan)
- Angeli di strada (1983)
- Bonno Soku Bodai (1987)
- Radici (1992)
- Kyoko mon amour (1997)
- Miami (1996)
- Sottacqua (2003)
- The Prog Years, 5 Cd-BoxSet (2018)

Awards and achievements
Preceded by Matia Bazar with "Raggio di luna"	Italy in the Eurovision Song Contest; 1980	Succeeded by Riccardo Fogli with "Per Lucia"
