= Norske Hits =

Compilation album by Boney M.
- Released: November 1998
- Recorded: 1976–1980, 1984, 1989, 1992, 1993
- Genre: Eurodance, pop, Euro disco
- Length: 73:37
- Label: BMG-Ariola (Norway)
- Producer: Frank Farian

Boney M. chronology
The Best of Boney M. (1997)	Norske Hits (1998)	Ultimate (1999)

Norske Hits is a compilation album of recordings by Boney M. released by BMG-Ariola in Norway in late 1998.

The compilation includes Boney M.'s greatest hits from a Norwegian perspective: singles "Daddy Cool"/"No Woman No Cry" (#1, 1976), "Sunny" (#4, 1977), "Ma Baker" (#1 1977), "Rivers Of Babylon"/"Brown Girl In The Ring" (#1, 1978), "Rasputin" (#10, 1978), "Hooray! Hooray! It's A Holiday" (#2, 1979), "Gotta Go Home"/"El Lute" (#4, 1979), "My Friend Jack" (#6, 1980), "The Summer Megamix" (#3, 1989) as well as 1984's "Kalimba de Luna" and selected tracks from their best-selling albums Take The Heat Off Me (#2, 1977), Love For Sale (#2, 1977), Nightflight to Venus (#1, 1978) and Oceans Of Fantasy (#1, 1979).

Norske Hits spent 12 weeks on the Norwegian charts in late 1998 and early 1999, peaking at #17.

== Track listing ==
1. "Daddy Cool" (Farian, Reyam) - 3:26
  - 1992 overdub version from Gold - 20 Super Hits
2. "Ma Baker" (Farian, Jay, Reyam) - 4:07
  - 1992 overdub edit from Gold - 20 Super Hits
3. "Rivers of Babylon" (Farian, Reyam) - 4:15
  - 1992 overdub version from Gold - 20 Super Hits
4. "Brown Girl in the Ring" (Farian) - 4:00
  - Remix '93, radio edit
5. "Hooray! Hooray! It's a Holi-Holiday " (Farian, Jay) - 3:55
  - 1992 overdub version from Gold - 20 Super Hits. Original 7" mix is released on "Kalimba de Luna" 2007 CD album.
6. "The Summer Mega Mix" (Bobby Hebb, Farian, Jay, Reyam, Klinkhammer, Amoruso, Esposito, Licastro, Malavasi) - 4:28
  - Radio edit. ("Sunny" / "Ma Baker" / "Gotta Go Home" / "Kalimba De Luna" / "Hooray! Hooray! It's A Holi-Holiday" / "Summer A GoGo")
7. "Sunny" (Bobby Hebb) - 3:56
  - 1992 overdub version from Gold - 20 Super Hits
8. "El Lute" (Blum, Farian, Jay) - 4:00
  - 1989 remix from Greatest Hits Of All Times - Remix '89 - Volume II, edited
9. "Gotta Go Home" (Farian, Huth, Jay) - 2:30
  - 1992 overdub edit from Gold - 20 Super Hits. Original 7" mix ( - 4:40) released on the "Let it All Be Music: The Party Album" 2009 double CD.
10. "My Friend Jack" (The Smoke) - 4:28
  - Original album version from The Magic Of Boney M. - 20 Golden Hits
11. "Rasputin" (Farian, Jay, Reyam) - 4:26
  - 1992 overdub edit from Gold - 20 Super Hits. Original 7" mix ( - 4:43) released on "The Collection" 2008 triple CD.
12. "Nightflight to Venus" (Frank Farian, Fred Jay, Kawohl) - 3:50
  - 1992 edit from Gold - 20 Super Hits
13. "Painter Man" (Phillips, Pickett) - 3:10
  - 1992 overdub version from Gold - 20 Super Hits
14. "Bahama Mama" (Farian, Jay) - 3:17
  - 1993 overdub edit from More Gold - 20 Super Hits Vol. II
15. "The Calendar Song (January, February, March...)" (Farian) - 3:25
  - 1993 remix from More Gold - 20 Super Hits Vol. II
16. "No Woman, No Cry" (Bob Marley) - 4:20
  - 1992 overdub edit from Gold - 20 Super Hits
17. "Belfast" (Billybury, Deutscher, Menke) - 3:25
  - 1992 overdub version from Gold - 20 Super Hits
18. "Fever" (Eddie Cooley, John Davenport) - 4:00
  - Original album version
19. "Kalimba de Luna" (Amoruso, DiFranco, Esposito, Licastro, Malavas) - 4:13
  - 1992 overdub version from Gold - 20 Super Hits

== Personnel ==
- Liz Mitchell - lead vocals, backing vocals
- Marcia Barrett - lead vocals, backing vocals
- Frank Farian - lead vocals, backing vocals
- Reggie Tsiboe - lead vocals, backing vocals

== Production ==
- Frank Farian - producer, remixer

== Sources and external links ==
- Rate Your Music, detailed discography
- Discogs.com, detailed discography
- Allmusic, biography, discography etc.
