= The Complete Collection (Boney M. album) =

Compilation album by Boney M.
- Released: November 2000
- Recorded: 1976–1986, 1989, 1992, 1993
- Genres: Eurodance, pop, Euro disco
- Length: 158:14
- Label: BMG/CMC (Denmark)
- Producer: Frank Farian

Boney M. chronology
25 Jaar Na Daddy Cool (2000)	The Complete Collection (2000)	Their Most Beautiful Ballads (2000)

The Complete Collection is a compilation album of recordings by Boney M. released by BMG/CMC Records in Denmark in late 2000.

Just like the Dutch 25 Jaar Na Daddy Cool this two disc forty track compilation celebrated the 25th anniversary of breakthrough single "Daddy Cool". The Complete Collection was the first Boney M. CD collection to include most of the original singles issued by the band between the years 1976 and 1986 in chronological running order, from the aforementioned "Daddy Cool" to final release "Bang Bang Lulu". The compilation also contains selected tracks from best-selling albums Love For Sale, Nightflight to Venus, Oceans of Fantasy, as well as 1989 single "The Summer Mega Mix" and concludes with tracks from the Boney M. Christmas Album.

The Complete Collection was a major commercial success in Denmark, peaking at #7 in the albums chart, which made it Boney M.'s best chart entry in the country since the late 1970s and the compilation was later awarded with a Platinum disc.

== Track listing ==
=== Disc one ===
1. "Daddy Cool" (Farian, Reyam) - 3:29
  - Original album version
2. "Sunny" (Bobby Hebb) - 4:03
  - Original album version
3. "No Woman, No Cry" (Vincent Ford, Bob Marley) - 4:21
  - 1992 overdub edit from Gold - 20 Super Hits
4. "Ma Baker" (Farian, Jay, Reyam) - 4:36
  - Original album version
5. "Love for Sale" (Cole Porter) - 4:47
  - Original album version
6. "Belfast" (Hillsbury, Deutscher, Menke) - 3:31
  - Original album version
7. "Have You Ever Seen the Rain?" (John Fogerty) - 2:40
  - Original album version
8. "Still I'm Sad" (Jim McCarty, Paul Samwell-Smith) - 4:34
  - Original album version
9. "Rivers of Babylon" (Farian, Reyam) - 4:18
  - Original album version
10. "Brown Girl in the Ring" (Farian) - 4:02
  - Original album version
11. "Heart of Gold" (Neil Young) - 4:00
  - Original album version
12. "Rasputin" (Farian, Jay, Reyam) - 4:24
  - 1992 overdub edit from Gold - 20 Super Hits. Original 7" mix ( - 4:43) remains unreleased on CD
13. "Painter Man" (Phillips, Pickett) - 3:10
  - Original album version
14. "Nightflight to Venus" (Frank Farian, Fred Jay, Kawohl) - 3:50
  - 1992 edit from Gold - 20 Super Hits
15. "Hooray! Hooray! It's a Holi-Holiday" (Farian, Jay) - 3:56
  - 1992 overdub version from Gold - 20 Super Hits. Original 7" mix remains unreleased on CD
16. "El Lute" (Farian, Jay, Klinkhammer, Kolonovits) - 4:00
  - 1989 remix from Greatest Hits Of All Times - Remix '89 - Volume II, edited
17. "Gotta Go Home" (Farian, Jay, Klinkhammer) - 3:45
  - Oceans of Fantasy album edit. Original 7" mix (- 4:00) remains unreleased on CD.
18. "I'm Born Again" (Fred Jay, Helmut Rulofs) - 4:09
  - Original album version
19. "Hold On I'm Coming" (Isaac Hayes, David Porter) - 3:38
  - Performed by Precious Wilson. 1994 CD edit.
20. "The Summer Mega Mix" (Bobby Hebb, Farian, Jay, Reyam, Klinkhammer, Amoruso, Esposito, Licastro, Malavasi) - 4:28
  - Radio edit. ("Sunny" / "Ma Baker" / "Gotta Go Home" / "Kalimba De Luna" / "Hooray! Hooray! It's A Holi-Holiday" / "Summer A GoGo")

=== Disc two ===
1. "The Calendar Song (January, February, March...)" (Frank Farian) - 2:41
  - Oceans of Fantasy CD edit
2. "Ribbons Of Blue" (Keith Forsey) - 2:00
  - Oceans of Fantasy album edit
3. "I See a Boat on the River" (Farian, Jay, Rulofs) - 4:31
  - 1993 overdub version from More Gold - 20 Super Hits Vol. II. Original 7" mix (- 4:40) remains unreleased on CD.
4. "My Friend Jack" (The Smoke) - 4:28
  - Edited album version from The Magic of Boney M. - 20 Golden Hits
5. "Children of Paradise" (Farian, Jay, Reyam) - 3:18
  - Edited version from More Gold - 20 Super Hits Vol. II. Original 7" mix ( - 4:28) remains unreleased on CD.
6. "Felicidad (Margherita)" (Conz, Massara) - 4:31
  - Original 7" version
7. "Malaika" (Fadhili William Mdawida) - 3:26
  - Edited 7" version from Boonoonoonoos limited edition double album. Original 7" mix ( - 5:02) remains unreleased on CD.
8. "We Kill the World (Don't Kill the World)" (Farian, Sgarbi) - 6:33
  - Original album version
9. "I Shall Sing" (Van Morrison) - 3:08
  - 1993 overdub version from More Gold - 20 Super Hits Vol. II
10. "The Carnival Is Over (Goodbye True Lover)" (Chappell, Farian, Tom Springfield, Traditional) - 4:52
  - Original 7" version
11. "Kalimba de Luna" (Amoruso, DiFranco, Esposito, Licastro, Malavas) - 4:13
  - 1992 overdub version from Gold - 20 Super Hits
12. "Happy Song" (Abacab, Bacciocchi, Spagna) - 3:54
  - Original 7" version (released as Boney M. with Bobby Farrell & The School Rebels)
13. "Jambo - Hakuna Matata (No Problems)" (Bischof, Harrison) - 3:38
  - Original 7" version
14. "My Cherie Amour" (Cosby, Moy, Stevie Wonder) - 4:04
  - Original album version
15. "Young, Free and Single" (Applegate, Farian, Rayen) - 4:10
  - Original album version
16. "Dreadlock Holiday" (Graham Gouldman, Eric Stewart) - 4:52
  - Original album version
17. "Bang Bang Lulu" (Farian) - 3:01
  - Original album version
18. "Feliz Navidad" (José Feliciano) - 2:21
  - 1986 version from The 20 Greatest Christmas Songs
19. "Mary's Boy Child/Oh My Lord" (Farian, Hairston) - 5:09
  - 1992 overdub edit from The Most Beautiful Christmas Songs of the World
20. "White Christmas" (Irving Berlin) - 3:21
  - 1986 edit from The 20 Greatest Christmas Songs

== Certifications ==
Region	Certification	Certified units/sales
Denmark (IFPI Danmark)	Platinum	50,000^{^}
^{^} Shipments figures based on certification alone.

== Release history ==
- 2000 Denmark: BMG/CMC Records 7432 1 81195 2 1

== Personnel ==
- Liz Mitchell - lead vocals, backing vocals
- Marcia Barrett - lead vocals, backing vocals
- Frank Farian - lead vocals, backing vocals
- Reggie Tsiboe - lead vocals, backing vocals
- Bobby Farrell - rap on Happy Song, vocoder vocals on Young, free & single

== Production ==
- Frank Farian - producer, remixer

== Sources and external links ==
- Rate Your Music, detailed discography
- Discogs.com, detailed discography
- Allmusic, biography, discography etc.
