= The Best of Boney M. =

Greatest hits album by Boney M.
- Released: 1997
- Recorded: 1976–1979, 1988
- Genre: Eurodance, pop, Euro disco
- Length: 71:40
- Label: Camden/BMG (UK)
- Producer: Frank Farian

Boney M. chronology
Best in Spain (1996)	The Best of Boney M. (1997)	Norske Hits (1998)

Professional ratings
Review scores
Source	Rating
Allmusic	link

The Best of Boney M. is a compilation album of recordings by Boney M. released by BMG UK's midprice label Camden in 1997.

This compilation includes material from original albums Take the Heat off Me, Love for Sale and Nightflight to Venus. It also features edited versions of hits from 1980 compilation The Magic of Boney M. - 20 Golden Hits as well as tracks from remix album Greatest Hits Of All Times - Remix '88.

== Track listing ==
1. "Rivers of Babylon" (Farian, Reyam) - 3:47
  - 1988 PWL remix from Greatest Hits Of All Times - Remix '88
2. "Ma Baker" (Farian, Jay, Reyam) - 4:37
  - Original album/single version
3. "Rasputin" (Farian, Jay, Reyam) - 5:54
  - Original album version, cold-start
4. "He Was a Steppenwolf" (Farian, Jay, Klinkhammer) - 6:53
  - Original album version
5. "Daddy Cool" (Farian, Reyam) - 3:29
  - Original album/single version
6. "Motherless Child" (Farian, Mitchell) - 4:59
  - Original album version
7. "Brown Girl in the Ring" (Farian) - 4:04
  - Original album/single version
8. "Sunny" (Bobby Hebb) - 3:17
  - Edited version from The Magic of Boney M. - 20 Golden Hits
9. "No Woman, No Cry" (Ford, Bob Marley) - 3:38
  - 1988 PWL remix from Greatest Hits Of All Times - Remix '88
10. "Mary's Boy Child/Oh My Lord" (Farian, Jester Hairston) - 4:25
  - 1988 PWL remix from Greatest Hits Of All Times - Remix '88
11. "Hooray! Hooray! It's a Holi-Holiday" (Farian, Jay) - 3:12
  - Edited version from The Magic of Boney M. - 20 Golden Hits. Original 7" mix released on the 2007 album Kalimba de Luna – 16 Happy Songs.
12. "Never Change Lovers in the Middle of the Night" (Björklund, Forsey, Jay) - 5:35
  - Original album version
13. "Voodoonight" (Sgarbi) - 3:33
  - Original album version
14. "Still I'm Sad" (McCarty, Samwell-Smith) - 4:36
  - Original album version
15. "Nightflight to Venus" (Farian, Jay, Kawohl) - 4:49
  - Original album version, fade-out
16. "Heart of Gold" (Neil Young) - 4:00
  - Original album version
17. "Gotta Go Home" (Farian, Jay, Klinkhammer) - 4:40
  - 1988 PWL remix from Greatest Hits Of All Times - Remix '88

== Personnel ==
- Liz Mitchell - lead vocals, backing vocals
- Marcia Barrett - lead vocals, backing vocals
- Frank Farian - lead vocals, backing vocals

== Production ==
- Frank Farian - producer
- Pete Hammond - remixer

== Certifications ==
Region	Certification	Certified units/sales
Australia (ARIA)	Platinum	70,000^{^}
Finland (Musiikkituottajat)	Gold	20,205
United Kingdom (BPI)	Gold	100,000^{^}
^{^} Shipments figures based on certification alone.
