= The Collection (1991 Boney M. album) =

Compilation album by Boney M.

Compilation album by Boney M.
- Released: 1991
- Recorded: 1976–80
- Genre: Reggae, Euro disco, R&B
- Length: 40:45
- Label: BMG-Ariola (FRG)
- Producer: Frank Farian

Boney M. chronology
Greatest Hits of All Times – Remix '89 – Volume II (1989)	The Collection (1991)	Daddy Cool – Star Collection (1991)

Cristal Collection (1994)

Compilation album by Boney M.

Sunny, Daddy Cool, Rivers Of Babylon (2001)

Compilation album by Boney M.

L'Essentiel (2001)

Compilation album by Boney M.

Professional ratings
Review scores
Source	Rating
Allmusic	3/5 stars
Select	1/5 stars

The Collection is a compilation album of recordings by Boney M. released by label BMG-Ariola in 1991.
The Collection was part of BMG's first mid-price CD campaign, the company released many Collections containing back-catalogue material by artists ranging from Modern Talking, Imagination and Amanda Lear to Chuck Berry, Glenn Miller and Elvis Presley.
The majority of the tracks on this release are taken from 1980 compilation The Magic of Boney M. - 20 Golden Hits, subsequently most of them appear in slightly edited form.
BMG-Ariola France has re-issued this compilation with new artwork as Cristal Collection in 1994 and as Sunny, Daddy Cool, Rivers Of Babylon and L'Essentiel, both in 2001.

== Track listing ==
1. "Rivers of Babylon" (Farian, Reyam) - 3:59
  - Edited version from The Magic of Boney M. - 20 Golden Hits
2. "Daddy Cool" (Farian, Reyam) - 3:25
  - Original album version
3. "Sunny" (Bobby Hebb) - 3:14
  - Edited version from The Magic of Boney M. - 20 Golden Hits
4. "My Friend Jack" (The Smoke) - 4:31
  - Edited album version from The Magic of Boney M. - 20 Golden Hits
5. "I See a Boat on the River" (Farian, Jay, Rulofs) - 3:03
  - Edited version from Fantastic Boney M.
6. "Brown Girl in the Ring" (Farian) - 3:06
  - Edited version from The Magic of Boney M. - 20 Golden Hits
7. "Mary's Boy Child/Oh My Lord" (Jester Hairston, Farian, Jay, Lorin) - 4:31
  - Edited version from The Magic of Boney M. - 20 Golden Hits
8. "Bahama Mama" (Farian, Jay) - 3:17
  - Oceans Of Fantasy album edit
9. "I'm Born Again" (Jay, Rulofs) - 3:57
  - Edited version from The Magic of Boney M. - 20 Golden Hits
10. "Oceans of Fantasy" (Kawohl & Towers) - 3:19
  - Edited version from The Magic of Boney M. - 20 Golden Hits
11. "Ribbons of Blue" (Keith Forsey) - 3:04
  - Edited version from The Magic of Boney M. - 20 Golden Hits

== Personnel ==
- Liz Mitchell - lead vocals, backing vocals
- Marcia Barrett - lead vocals, backing vocals
- Frank Farian - lead vocals, backing vocals

== Production ==
- Frank Farian - producer

== Release history ==
- 1991 Germany: BMG-Ariola 261 670, 616 701.
- 1994 France: Cristal Collection BMG-Ariola 74321 0007 208.
- 2001 France: L'Essentiel BMG-Ariola 74321 844 902.

== Sources and external links ==
- Rate Your Music, detailed discography
- Discogs.com, detailed discography
- Allmusic, biography, discography etc.
