= Gold – 20 Super Hits =

- Cover art to most international versions and German re-release

Greatest hits album by Boney M.
- Released: November 1992
- Recorded: 1975–84
- Genres: Euro disco, reggae, R&B
- Length: 75:31
- Label: MCI/BMG (EU)
- Producer: Frank Farian

Boney M. chronology
Daddy Cool – Star Collection (1991)	Gold – 20 Super Hits (1992)	The Most Beautiful Christmas Songs of the World (1992)

Alternative cover
- Canadian Edition.

Alternative cover
- Original German release, prior to replacement of "Brown Girl in The Ring"

Singles from Gold – 20 Super Hits
- 1. "Mega Mix" Released: November 1992; 2. "Mary's Boy Child - Oh My Lord (Christmas Mega Mix)" Released: December 1992; 3. "Brown Girl in the Ring (Remix)" Released: 1 April 1993

Professional ratings
Review scores
Source	Rating
Allmusic	4.5/5 stars

Gold – 20 Super Hits is a 1992 greatest hits album by group Boney M. Shortly after record label PolyGram had acquired the rights to the ABBA back catalogue and had issued the multimillion-selling hits package Gold: Greatest Hits, BMG and producer Frank Farian followed suit with Boney M.'s Gold – 20 Super Hits which resulted in their best chart entry in the UK (#14 – see The Greatest Hits) and most other European countries since 1980's The Magic of Boney M. – 20 Golden Hits.

Producer Farian controversially edited most of the tracks and also overdubbed them with synthesized 1990s percussion such as disco hi-hats, sampled tambourines and handclaps specifically for this release. These mixes have since appeared on various Boney M. hit collections issued in the 1990s and 2000s, most notably 2006's The Magic of Boney M., which featured nearly all of the tracks that appeared on this release in this form.

Gold – 20 Super Hits/The Greatest Hits included a new "Boney M. Megamix", also issued as a single, which reached #7 in the UK in December 1992 and gave the group their tenth UK Top 10 entry.

== Track listing ==
1. "Rivers of Babylon" (Dowe, McNaughton) – 4:15
  - 1992 overdub version of single version. Replaced by a pitched-up version of the same mix on later German issues.
2. "Daddy Cool" (Farian, Reyam) – 3:26
  - 1992 overdub version.
3. "Sunny" (Hebb) – 3:56
  - 1992 overdub version.
4. "Brown Girl in the Ring" (Farian) – 4:00
  - 1992 overdub version. Replaced by the Remix '93 Radio Edit on later German issues.
5. "Rasputin" (Farian, Jay, Reyam) – 4:24
  - 1992 overdub edit of single version. Full-length version available on The Greatest Hits (1993).
6. "Ma Baker" (Farian, Jay, Reyam) – 4:05
  - 1992 overdub edit. Full-length version available on The Greatest Hits (1993).
7. "Hooray! Hooray! It's a Holi-Holiday" (Farian) – 3:55
  - 1992 overdub version.
8. "Painter Man" (Phillips, Pickette) – 3:16
  - 1992 overdub version.
9. "Belfast" (Billybury, Deutscher, Menke) – 3:25
  - 1992 overdub version.
10. "No Woman No Cry" (Bob Marley) – 4:20
  - 1992 overdub edit. Full-length version available on The Greatest Hits (1993).
11. "Mary's Boy Child / Oh My Lord" (Jester Hairston, Farian, Jay, Lorin) – 4:01
  - 1992 overdub edit of Christmas Album version. Full-length version available on The Most Beautiful Christmas Songs of the World.
12. "Gotta Go Home" (Farian, Huth, Jay) – 2:30
  - 1992 overdub edit of Oceans of Fantasy album version.
13. "Still I'm Sad" (April, McCarty, Samwell-Smith) – 4:24
  - 1992 overdub edit. Full-length version available on The Greatest Hits (1993).
14. "Nightflight To Venus" (Farian, Jay, Kawohl) – 3:49
  - 1992 edited version.
15. "Felicidad (Margherita)" (Conz, Massara) – 2:50
  - 1984 edited version from Kalimba de Luna – 16 Happy Songs, overdubbed.
16. "El Lute" (Blum, Farian, Jay) – 3:58
  - 1989 remix version from Greatest Hits Of All Times – Remix '89 – Volume II, edited.
17. "Baby Do You Wanna Bump" (Zambi) – 2:25
  - 1992 overdub edit.
18. "Kalimba De Luna" (Amoruso, Esposito, Licastro, Malavasi) – 4:11
  - 1992 overdub edit.
19. "Happy Song" (Abacab, Bacciocci, Spagna) – 3:56
  - Edited 7" version. (released as Boney M. with Bobby Farrell and The School Rebels)
20. "Boney M. Megamix" (Farian, Reyam, Hebb, Jay) – 3:51
  - 1992 version, radio edit. ("Rivers of Babylon" / "Sunny" / "Daddy Cool" / "Ma Baker" / "Rasputin")

== Personnel ==
- Liz Mitchell – lead vocals, backing vocals
- Marcia Barrett – lead vocals, backing vocals
- Frank Farian – lead vocals, backing vocals
- Reggie Tsiboe – lead vocals, backing vocals (tracks 18 & 19)
- Bobby Farrell – vocals (track 19)

== Production ==
- Frank Farian – producer, remixer

== Release history ==
- 1993 EU: MCI / BMG 74321 12577 1 (LP)
- 1993 EU: MCI / BMG 74321 12577 2 (CD)
- 1993 EU: BMG Ariola 74321 126052 7 (CD)

== Single releases ==
EU

7"

- "Megamix" (Radio Edit) – 3:51 / "Bang Bang Lulu" – 3:01 (MCI/BMG 74321 12606-7, 1992)

12"

- "Megamix" (MCI/BMG 74321 12606-1, 1992)

Side A

1. "Megamix (Long Version) – 6:12
2. "Babysitter" (1983 recording – 1992 remix) – 3:48

Side B

1. "Megamix" (Radio edit) – 3:51
2. "Bang Bang Lulu" – 3:01
- "Brown Girl In The Ring (Remix '93)" (MCI/BMG 74321 13705 1, 1993)

Side A

1. "Brown Girl in the Ring" (Funny Girl Club Mix) – 5:35
2. "The Calendar Song (January, February, March...)" (Remix '93) – 3:14

Side B

1. "Brown Girl in the Ring" (Club Mix – Rap Version) – 5:35
2. "Brown Girl in the Ring" (Radio Version) – 3:58

CD

- "Megamix" (MCI/BMG 74321 12606-2, 1992)
  1. "Mega Mix" (Radio Edit) – 3:51
  2. "Megamix" (Long version) – 6:12
  3. "Bang Bang Lulu" – 3:01
  4. "Babysitter" – 3:48
- "Brown Girl In The Ring (Remix '93)" (MCI/BMG 74321 13705 2, 1993)
  1. "Brown Girl in the Ring" (Radio Version) – 3:58
  2. "Brown Girl in the Ring" (Funny Girl Club Mix) – 5:35
  3. "Brown Girl in the Ring" (Club Mix – Rap Version) – 5:35
  4. "The Calendar Song (January, February, March...)" (Remix '93) – 3:14

== Charts ==
=== Weekly charts ===
Chart (1993–2001)	Peak position
Australian Albums (ARIA)	40
Austrian Albums (Ö3 Austria)	6
Finnish Albums (Suomen virallinen lista)	1
Dutch Albums (Album Top 100)	2
French Albums (SNEP)	146
German Albums (Offizielle Top 100)	5
Hungarian Albums (MAHASZ)	2
New Zealand Albums (RMNZ)	2
Norwegian Albums (VG-lista)	6
Swedish Albums (Sverigetopplistan)	14
Swiss Albums (Schweizer Hitparade)	5

=== Year-end charts ===
Chart (1993)	Position
Austrian Albums (Ö3 Austria)	35
Dutch Albums (Album Top 100)	12
German Albums (Offizielle Top 100)	36
New Zealand Albums (RMNZ)	13
Swiss Albums (Schweizer Hitparade)	38

== Certifications and sales ==
Region	Certification	Certified units/sales
Australia (ARIA)	Gold	35,000^{^}
Austria (IFPI Austria)	Platinum	50,000^{*}
Finland (Musiikkituottajat)	Gold	46,029
France (SNEP)	Gold	100,000^{*}
Germany (BVMI)	Gold	250,000^{^}
Netherlands (NVPI)	Gold	50,000^{^}
New Zealand (RMNZ)	Platinum	15,000^{^}
Norway (IFPI Norway)	Platinum	50,000^{*}
Switzerland (IFPI Switzerland)	Platinum	50,000^{^}
^{*} Sales figures based on certification alone.^{^} Shipments figures based on certification alone.

== The Greatest Hits (1993 UK Release) ==
The Greatest Hits is a greatest hits album by Boney M., released in 1993. It is the UK version of BMG's Gold – 20 Super Hits, with alternate album art and a slightly different track listing.

Besides Boney M.'s best known hits like "Daddy Cool", "Ma Baker" and "Rivers of Babylon", this fourteen track compilation also includes the 1993 remix of "Brown Girl in the Ring" (UK #38) that was issued in both the UK and the rest of Europe as the follow-up single to the 1992 "Megamix" (UK #7). While still in overdubbed form, three tracks on this compilation, "Rasputin", "Ma Baker" and "No Woman, No Cry" are also featured in their full length, as opposed to the versions on the German BMG predecessor Gold – 20 Super Hits. The Greatest Hits omits songs like "Felicidad (Margherita)", "Kalimba de Luna" and "Happy Song", which were not hits in the UK (It should also be worth noting "Felicidad" wasn't released as a single in the UK).

The Greatest Hits was released by the now defunct Telstar Records, while the singles "Megamix" and "Brown Girl in the Ring (Remix '93)" were issued by Arista Records, which at the time was operating as a sublabel to BMG.

The Greatest Hits reached number 14 on the UK Albums Chart in early 1993, which made it Boney M.'s highest-charting album since 1980's The Magic of Boney M. – 20 Golden Hits.

== Sources and external links ==
- Rate Your Music, detailed discography
- Discogs.com, detailed discography
- All Music Guide, biography, discography etc.
