= Daddy Cool – Star Collection =

Daddy Cool - Star Collection

Compilation album by Boney M.
- Released: 1991
- Recorded: 1976–89
- Genres: Reggae, Euro disco, R&B
- Length: 54:41
- Label: BMG-Ariola (FRG)
- Producer: Frank Farian

Boney M. chronology
The Collection (1991)	Daddy Cool - Star Collection (1991)	Gold – 20 Super Hits (1992)

Daddy Cool (1994)

Compilation album by Boney M.
- Released: 1994

Daddy Cool (2001)

Compilation album by Boney M.
- Released: 2001

Daddy Cool – Star Collection is a compilation of recordings by Boney M. released by BMG-Ariola's mid-price label Ariola Express in Germany in 1991.

This release includes versions from the original studio albums as well as previous compilations The Magic Of Boney M. - 20 Golden Hits, Fantastic Boney M., 1986's medley album The Best Of 10 Years - 32 Superhits and Greatest Hits Of All Times - Remix '89 - Volume II. The timings given on the original album cover were in some cases incorrect - the list below states the tracks and versions appearing on the actual disc.

Daddy Cool - Star Collection was re-issued by BMG-Ariola as Daddy Cool in 1994 and 2001.

== Track listing ==
1. "Rivers of Babylon" (Farian, Reyam) - 1:45
  - Excerpt from The Best Of 10 Years - 32 Superhits
2. "El Lute" (Farian, Jay, Klinkhammer, Kolonovits) - 4:25
  - Edited version from The Magic Of Boney M. - 20 Golden Hits
3. "Rasputin" (Farian, Jay, Reyam) - 3:41
  - Edited version from The Magic Of Boney M. - 20 Golden Hits. Original 7" mix ( - 4:43) released on the 2008 CD compilation "The Collection".
4. "Belfast" (Hillsbury, Deutscher, Menke) - 3:32
  - Original album/single version
5. "Hooray! Hooray! It's a Holi-Holiday" (Farian) - 3:10
  - Edited version from The Magic Of Boney M. - 20 Golden Hits. Original 7" mix ( - 3:55) released on the 2007 album "Kalimba de Luna".
6. "Baby Do You Wanna Bump" (Zambi) - 3:40
  - Original single version
7. "Daddy Cool" (Farian, Reyam) - 3:27
  - Original album/single version
8. "Ma Baker" (Farian, Jay, Reyam) - 4:37
  - Original album/single version
9. "Malaika" (Farian, Traditional) - 3:28
  - Edited 7" version from Boonoonoonoos limited edition double album. Original 7" mix ( - 5:02) released on the 2008 CD compilation "The Collection".
10. "Sunny" (Bobby Hebb) - 3:16
  - Edited version from The Magic Of Boney M. - 20 Golden Hits
11. "I See a Boat on the River" (Farian, Jay, Rulofs) - 3:11
  - Edited version from Fantastic Boney M.
12. "Painter Man" (Phillips, Pickett) - 1:57
  - Short edit
13. "Kalimba de Luna" (Amoruso, Esposito, Licastro, Malavasi) - 4:29
  - Lambada Mix - Long Version, from Greatest Hits Of All Times - Remix '89 - Volume II
14. "Felicidad (Margherita)" (Conz, Massara) - 3:52
  - Lambada Mix from Greatest Hits Of All Times - Remix '89 - Volume II
15. "Barbarella Fortuneteller" (Davis, Farian, Kawohl) - 2:59
  - Original album version
16. "No Woman, No Cry" (Ford, Bob Marley) - 2:59
  - Edited version from The Magic Of Boney M. - 20 Golden Hits

== Personnel ==
- Liz Mitchell - lead vocals, backing vocals
- Marcia Barrett - lead vocals, backing vocals
- Frank Farian - lead vocals, backing vocals
- Reggie Tsiboe - lead vocals, backing vocals (tracks 13 & 15)

== Production ==
- Frank Farian - producer

== Certifications ==
Region	Certification	Certified units/sales
Germany (BVMI)	Platinum	500,000^{^}
^{^} Shipments figures based on certification alone.

== Release history ==
- 1991 Germany: Ariola Express 290 799-200
- 1994 & 2001 Germany: Daddy Cool, Ariola Express 74321 1864 2
- The Boney M. discography mentions also a Cassette release
- The Boney M. discography mentions also a Vinyl release
