= I See a Boat on the River =

"I See a Boat on the River / My Friend Jack"

Single by Boney M.

from the album The Magic of Boney M.
- Released: April 1980
- Recorded: 1980
- Genre: Pop, Euro disco
- Label: Hansa Records (FRG)
- Producer: Frank Farian

Boney M. singles chronology
"I'm Born Again / Bahama Mama" (1979)	""I See a Boat on the River" / "My Friend Jack"" (1980)	"Children of Paradise" / "Gadda-Da-Vida" (1980)

"I See a Boat on the River" / "My Friend Jack" is a double A-side single by German band Boney M., taken from their 1980 compilation album The Magic of Boney M. - 20 Golden Hits. "I See a Boat on the River" peaked at #5 in Germany but marked the group's waning popularity in the UK where "My Friend Jack" was promoted as the A-side, faring even worse than their former single "I'm Born Again", stalling at #57. Boney M. would use the double A-side format over the next years, typically with the A1 being the song intended for radio and A2 being more squarely aimed at discos. The sides would usually be switched on the accompanying 12" single.

== "I See a Boat on the River" ==
"I See a Boat on the River" was written by another Farian artist Gilla (aka Gisela Wuchinger = G. Winger) and her fiancé Helmut Rulofs. Producer Frank Farian added some additional parts and lyricist Fred Jay re-wrote the original lyrics which went I beg you boat on the river and birds in the sky / Show me the way home or teach me to fly. There were two different single versions, one including an extra chorus before the 3rd verse and a different intro.

== "My Friend Jack" ==
Originally a 1967 rock track by British group The Smoke, the song "My Friend Jack" is about Jack who eats "sugar lumps" (i.e. LSD) and travels the world inside his mind. Original Smoke member Zeke Lund was by now working as a sound engineer for Frank Farian. The initial single pressings featured a 4:56 single mix, differing with the omission of a guitar solo which was included in the subsequent 4:40 mix which was faded 10 seconds earlier on the LP version. The French 12” single includes a version of the early single mix with the guitar solo added back in.

== Releases ==
7" Single

- "I See a Boat on the River" (Rulofs, Farian, Winger, Jay) (Extended LP Mix) - 4:29 / "My Friend Jack" (Smoke) (Alternate 7" Version) - 4:56 (Hansa 101 750-100, Germany, A-3/B-2)
- "I See a Boat on the River" (Rulofs, Farian, Winger, Jay) (Extended LP Mix) - 4:29 / "My Friend Jack" (Smoke) (Extended LP Mix) - 4:40 (Hansa 101 750-100, Germany, A-6/B-7)
- "I See a Boat on the River" (Rulofs, Farian, Winger, Jay) (7" Version) - 4:40 / "My Friend Jack" (Smoke) (Extended LP Mix) - 4:40 (Hansa 101 750-100, Germany, A-16/B-7)
- "My Friend Jack" - 4:40 / "I See a Boat on the River" - 4:40 (Atlantic K11463, UK)
- "My Friend Jack" - 4:40 / "I See a Boat on the River" - 4:40 (Atlantic P-579A, Japan)

12" Single

- "My Friend Jack" (France 12" Version) - 5:00 / "I See a Boat on the River" - 4:40 (Carrere 49.621, France)
- "My Friend Jack" (Long Version) - 8:26 / "I See a Boat on the River" (Long Version) - 6:06 (Hansa 600 233-213, Germany)

== Charts ==
=== Weekly charts ===
Chart (1980)	Peak position
Argentina	17
Austria (Ö3 Austria Top 40)	3
Belgium (Ultratop 50 Flanders)	7
Finland (Suomen Virallinen)	4
Netherlands (Dutch Top 40)	7
Netherlands (Single Top 100)	4
Switzerland (Schweizer Hitparade)	9
West Germany (GfK)	5
UK Singles (OCC) My Friend Jack	57

=== Year-end charts ===
Chart (1980)	Position
Austria (Ö3 Austria Top 40)	19
Belgium (Ultratop Flanders)	54
Netherlands (Dutch Top 40)	84
Netherlands (Single Top 100)	61
West Germany (Official German Charts)	25
