= Megamix (1988 Boney M. song) =

Single by Boney M.

from the album Greatest Hits of All Times – Remix '88
- Released: October 1988
- Genre: Pop, disco
- Label: Hansa Records (FRG)
- Producer: Frank Farian

Boney M. singles chronology
"Rivers of Babylon (Remix)" / "Mary's Boy Child / Oh My Lord (Remix)" (1988)	"Megamix" (1988)	"The Summer Mega Mix" (1989)

Music video
- "Boney M. - Megamix (Official Video)" on YouTube

"Megamix" is a 1988 single by German band Boney M. The single peaked at #1 in the French charts and was a minor success in the UK where it peaked at #52. The megamix is a medley of remixed Boney M. hits, "Rivers of Babylon", "Sunny", "Daddy Cool" and "Rasputin", the 12" version being extended with "Ma Baker" and "Gotta Go Home".

The B-side of the German single, a remix of the group's 1978 hit "Rasputin", was issued as an A-side in the UK where the Megamix was backed with a remix of their 1978 chart-topper "Mary's Boy Child – Oh My Lord".

== Releases ==
=== Germany ===
7" single / Hansa Records 111 973-100, 1988

1. "Megamix" (radio edit) - 3:54
2. "Rasputin" (remix '88 - radio edit) - 4:08

12" maxi / Hansa Records 611 973-213, 1988

1. "Megamix" (extended version) - 7:02
2. "Rasputin" (remix '88) - 5:25
3. "Megamix" (radio edit) - 3:54

CD maxi / Hansa Records 661 973-211, 1988

1. "Megamix" (extended version) - 7:02
2. "Rasputin" (remix '88) - 5:25
3. "Megamix" (radio edit) - 3:54

=== UK ===
7" single / Ariola Records 111 947, 1988

1. "Megamix" (radio edit) - 3:54
2. "Mary's Boy Child/Oh My Lord" (remix '88) - 4:22

7" single / Ariola Records 112 096, 1989

1. "Rasputin" (remix '88 - radio edit) - 4:08
2. "Megamix" (radio edit) - 3:54

12" single / Ariola Records 611 947 BB, 1988

1. "Megamix" (extended version) - 7:02
2. "Rivers of Babylon" (remix '88) - 3:40
3. "Mary's Boy Child/Oh My Lord" (remix '88) - 4:22

12" single / Ariola Records 612 096 BB, 1989

1. "Rasputin" (remix '88) - 5:25
2. "Megamix" (extended version) - 7:02

== Charts ==
=== Peak positions ===
Chart (1989)	Peak position
French SNEP Singles Chart	1

=== Year-end charts ===
Chart (1989)	Position
Europe (Eurochart Hot 100)	23

== Certifications ==
Region	Certification	Certified units/sales
France (SNEP)	Gold	400,000^{*}
^{*} Sales figures based on certification alone.
