= Greatest Hits of All Times – Remix '88 =

Remix album

Remix album by Boney M.
- Released: October 1988
- Recorded: 1976–1979, 1988
- Genre: R&B; reggae; eurodisco
- Length: 49:00
- Label: Hansa (FRG); Ariola (UK)
- Producer: Frank Farian

Boney M. chronology
The 20 Greatest Christmas Songs (1986)	Greatest Hits of All Times – Remix '88 (1988)	Greatest Hits of All Times – Remix '89 – Volume II (1989)

Singles from Greatest Hits of All Times – Remix '88
- 1. "Rivers of Babylon (Remix)"/"Mary's Boy Child / Oh My Lord (Remix)" Released: October 1988

Professional ratings
Review scores
Source	Rating
AllMusic	2.5/5 stars

Greatest Hits of All Times – Remix '88 is a remix album by Boney M., released in 1988. The album contains some of Boney M.'s best-known songs, remixed by Pete Hammond.

== Background and release ==
Boney M.'s new manager at the time, Simon Napier-Bell, succeeded in persuading the four original members to briefly reunite and promote this remix album. The man employed to re-arrange the original hits and create new interest in the band was PWL's Pete Hammond, who had previously remixed many of the Stock Aitken Waterman stable's chart-topping hits with Kylie Minogue, Jason Donovan, Rick Astley and Bananarama. Five of the tracks also feature new lead vocals by original member Liz Mitchell. In early 2021, Hammond recalled the following about the '88 remix project, explaining the new vocals: "The 2inch 24 track multi-track tapes were sent to PWL by [producer/songwriter] Frank Farian of Far Music. Apparently, they had lost some of the original recordings—four songs if I remember correctly—and had to record four new versions; they were musically incomplete but good enough for me to overdub and remix". The remix project spun off three fairly successful single releases, "Rivers of Babylon (Remix '88)", "Rasputin (Remix '88)" and the 1988 "Megamix", which would appear on the follow-up album, Greatest Hits of All Times – Remix '89 – Volume II, issued a year later, and created the first wave of Boney M. nostalgia in Europe.

While producer Frank Farian continued to release new recordings under the name Boney M., such as 1990 non-album single "Stories" (featuring both Liz Mitchell and Reggie Tsiboe) and the four new recordings on compilation More Gold – 20 Super Hits Vol. II in 1993, Greatest Hits of All Times – Remix '88 was the final album project to involve all four of the original Boney M. members; Marcia Barrett, Bobby Farrell, Liz Mitchell and Maizie Williams.

== Track listing ==
1. "Sunny" (Bobby Hebb) – 3:43
2. "Daddy Cool" (Frank Farian, George Reyam) – 3:33
3. "Rasputin" (Farian, Reyam, Fred Jay) – 5:27
4. "Ma Baker" (Farian, Reyam, Jay) – 4:42
5. "Take the Heat off Me" (Giancarlo Bigazzi) – 3:53
6. "Hooray! Hooray! It's a Holi-Holiday" (Farian, Jay) – 3:23
7. "Rivers of Babylon" (Farian, Reyam) – 3:44
8. "No Woman, No Cry" (Vincent Ford, Bob Marley) – 3:36
9. "Brown Girl in the Ring" (Farian) – 4:01
10. "Gotta Go Home" (Farian, Jay, Heinz Huth, Jürgen Huth,) – 4:40
11. "Painter Man" (Eddie Phillips, Kenny Pickett) – 3:49
12. "Mary's Boy Child/Oh My Lord" (Farian, Jay, Jester Hairston, Hela Lorin) – 4:22

== Personnel ==
Musicians

- Liz Mitchell – lead vocals (tracks 1, 2, 6–9, 11, 12), backing vocals
- Marcia Barrett – lead vocals (track 5), backing vocals
- Frank Farian – lead vocals, backing vocals

Production

- Frank Farian – producer
- Pete Hammond – remixer
- A PWL Production
- Recorded at PWL Studios London

== Charts ==
Chart performance for Greatest Hits of All Times – Remix '88
Chart (1988)	Peak position
Dutch Albums (Album Top 100)	77
Swedish Albums (Sverigetopplistan)	48
