= Children of Paradise (song) =

"Children of Paradise / Gadda-Da-Vida"

Single by Boney M.
- Released: September 1980
- Recorded: 1980
- Genre: Pop, Euro disco
- Label: Hansa Records (FRG)
- Songwriters: Frank Farian, Fred Jay, George Reyam
- Producer: Frank Farian

Boney M. singles chronology
"I See a Boat on the River" / "My Friend Jack" (1980)	"Children of Paradise" / "Gadda-Da-Vida" (1980)	"Felicidad (Margherita)" (1980)

"Children of Paradise" / "Gadda-Da-Vida" is a 1980 single by German band Boney M. Intended to be the first single from the group's fifth album Boonoonoonoos (originally scheduled for a November 1980 release), the single was ultimately never included because the album release was delayed for one year. "Children of Paradise" peaked at #11 in the German charts whereas it became the group's lowest placing in the UK at #66 only when released in February '81. Boney M. would use the double A-side format in this period, typically with the A1 being the song intended for radio and A2 being more squarely aimed at discos. The sides would usually be switched on the accompanying 12" single.

== Children of Paradise ==
A synth disco track, based on Moroccan Younes Megri's hit "Lili Twil", "Children of Paradise" went through several try-outs, and Boney M. themselves performed several different versions on various TV shows. The first single versions (with the ad for the 5th album on the back cover) had a double chorus after the 2nd verse and then faded during the 3rd verse. The second and final mix had only one chorus after the 2nd and faded after the 3rd chorus. The second single pressings was pressed with an ad for The Magic of Boney M. - 20 Golden Hits on the back cover since it had been decided the new album needed more time to be completed.

Lead vocal: Liz Mitchell. Backing vocals: Liz Mitchell, Marcia Barrett, Frank Farian.

== Gadda-Da-Vida ==
Although no-one knew at the time it was recorded, "Gadda-Da-Vida" became a controversial Boney M. record since it turned out none of the original members sang on it. Due to a fall-out between producer Frank Farian and the group, he had session singers La Mama (Cathy Bartney, Patricia Shockley and Madeleine Davis) sing the female vocals while he did the deep male vocals as usual. The group only promoted it once on TV. Two different single edits were done of the full 9 minutes version that appeared on the 12" single. "Gadda-Da-Vida" was the A-side in Japan. Only the French release correctly stated the song title as In-A-Gadda-Da-Vida.

Iron Butterfly released the original version on single in 1968.

== Releases ==
7" Singles

- "Children of Paradise" (Farian, Reyam, Jay) - 4:40 / "Gadda-Da-Vida" (Ingle) - 5:18 (Hansa 102 400-100, Germany)
- "Children of Paradise" (Final mix) - 4:28 / "Gadda-Da-Vida" (Final mix) - 4:58 (Most overseas issues: 5:05) (Hansa 102 400-100, Germany)
- "Children of Paradise" - 4:21 / "Gadda-Da-Vida" - 4:45 (Atlantic K11637, UK)

12" Single

- "Gadda-Da-Vida" (Long Version) - 8:56 / "Children of Paradise" (12" mix) - 5:18 (Hansa 600 280-100, Germany)

== Charts ==
Weekly charts
Chart (1981)	Peak position
Argentina	29
Germany (Official German Charts)	11
UK Singles (Official Charts Company)	66
