= The Complete Collection =

The Complete Collection may refer to:

- The Complete Collection (Boney M. album), 2000
- The Complete Collection (Lisa Stansfield album), 2003
- The Complete Collection, a 2021 EP by Bella Taylor Smith

== See also ==
- The Complete Collection and Then Some..., a greatest hits compilation by Barry Manilow
