= It's Smoke Time =

Studio album by The Smoke
- Released: 1967
- Recorded: May − November 1966
- Genre: Garage rock, psychedelic pop, beat, freakbeat, sunshine pop
- Length: 29:16
- Label: Metronome
- Producer: The Smoke, Monty Babson

Singles from It's Smoke Time
- 1. "My Friend Jack" Released: 10 February 1967; 2. "High in a Room / If the Weather's Sunny" Released: August 1967

Professional ratings
Review scores
Source	Rating
Allmusic	4/5 stars

It's Smoke Time is the only studio album by the British psychedelic pop band The Smoke, released in early 1967, originally by Swedish label Metronome Records only in Germany.

It features the hit single “My Friend Jack”, number two on the German charts.

== Track listing ==
All songs written by The Smoke, except where indicated:

=== LP Side A ===
1. "My Friend Jack" - 3:03
2. "Waterfall" - 2:41
3. "You Can't Catch Me" - 3:17
4. "High in a Room" - 3:00
5. "Wake Up Cherylina" - 2:19
6. "Don't Lead Me On" (Jerry Reno, Terry Brown) - 2:17

=== LP Side B ===
1. We Can Take It - 2:43
2. "If the Weather's Sunny" - 2:50
3. "I Wanna Make It with You" - 3:10
4. "It's Getting Closer" - 2:33
5. "It's Just Your Way of Lovin'" - 2:25
6. "I Would If I Could But I Can't" - 2:14

=== Bonus tracks (only CD release) ===
1. "Have Some More Tea (Greg Ridley) - 2:13
2. "Victor Henry's Cool Book" - 2:28
3. "Sydney Gill" - 3:32
4. "It Could Be Wonderful" (Jimmy Miller) - 2:18
5. "Keep a Hold of What You've Got" (A. Maldon) - 2:06
6. "She's a Liar" (A. Maldon) - 2:21
7. "I Am Only Dreaming" - 1:59
8. "Universal Vagrant" (Bob Feldman, Jerry Goldstein, Richard Gottehrer, Wes Farrell) - 2:53
9. "Dreams of Dreams" (Chapman, Vaughan, Williams) - 2:31
10. "My Birth" (Francis) - 2:41
11. "Jack Is Back" (Danny Beckerman) - 3:18
12. "That's What I Want" (Wil Malone) - 2:25
13. "Playing with Magic" (W. Malone) - 3:07
14. "My Friend Jack (Alternate Take)" - 3:10

== Personnel ==
=== The Smoke ===
- Mick Rowley – Vocals, Guitar [With Two Fingers]
- Mal Luker – Guitar, Keyboards, Sitar
- Zeke Lund – Bass
- Geoff Gill – Drums

=== Additional personnel ===
- Supervised By – Monty Babson
- Performer, Primary Artist – Shotstar
- Liner Notes – Mark Brennan
