= List of European number-one hits of 1979 =

This is a list of the Hitkrant Europarade number-one singles of 1979.

Date	Song	Artist
January 4	"Mary's Boy Child/Oh My Lord"	Boney M.
January 11	"Y.M.C.A."	Village People
January 18	"Y.M.C.A."	Village People
January 25	"Y.M.C.A."	Village People
February 1	"Y.M.C.A."	Village People
February 8	"Y.M.C.A."	Village People
February 15	"Y.M.C.A."	Village People
February 22	"Y.M.C.A."	Village People
March 1	"Y.M.C.A."	Village People
March 8	"Y.M.C.A."	Village People
March 15	"Chiquitita"	ABBA
March 22	"Chiquitita"	ABBA
March 29	"Tragedy"	Bee Gees
April 5	"Tragedy"	Bee Gees
April 12	"Tragedy"	Bee Gees
April 19	"Tragedy"	Bee Gees
April 26	"Tragedy"	Bee Gees
May 3	"Hooray! Hooray! It's a Holi-Holiday"	Boney M.
May 10	"Hooray! Hooray! It's a Holi-Holiday"	Boney M.
May 17	"Hooray! Hooray! It's a Holi-Holiday"	Boney M.
May 24	"Hooray! Hooray! It's a Holi-Holiday"	Boney M.
May 31	"Hooray! Hooray! It's a Holi-Holiday"	Boney M.
June 7	"Hooray! Hooray! It's a Holi-Holiday"	Boney M.
June 14	"Does Your Mother Know"	ABBA
June 21	"Does Your Mother Know"	ABBA
June 28	"Does Your Mother Know"	ABBA
July 5	"Pop Muzik"	M
July 12	"Pop Muzik"	M
July 19	"Pop Muzik"	M
July 26	"Pop Muzik"	M
August 2	"Pop Muzik"	M
August 9	"Ring My Bell"	Anita Ward
August 16	"Ring My Bell"	Anita Ward
August 23	"Ring My Bell"	Anita Ward
August 30	"Gotta Go Home"/"El Lute"	Boney M.
September 6	"Gotta Go Home"/"El Lute"	Boney M.
September 13	"Gotta Go Home"/"El Lute"	Boney M.
September 20	"Gotta Go Home"/"El Lute"	Boney M.
September 27	"Gotta Go Home"/"El Lute"	Boney M.
October 4	"Gotta Go Home"/"El Lute"	Boney M.
October 11	"We Don't Talk Anymore"	Cliff Richard
October 18	"We Don't Talk Anymore"	Cliff Richard
October 25	"We Don't Talk Anymore"	Cliff Richard
November 1	"We Don't Talk Anymore"	Cliff Richard
November 8	"We Don't Talk Anymore"	Cliff Richard
November 15	"Gimme! Gimme! Gimme! (A Man After Midnight)"	ABBA
November 22	"Gimme! Gimme! Gimme! (A Man After Midnight)"	ABBA
November 29	"Gimme! Gimme! Gimme! (A Man After Midnight)"	ABBA
December 6	"Gimme! Gimme! Gimme! (A Man After Midnight)"	ABBA
December 13	"Gimme! Gimme! Gimme! (A Man After Midnight)"	ABBA
December 20	"Gimme! Gimme! Gimme! (A Man After Midnight)"	ABBA
December 27	"Gimme! Gimme! Gimme! (A Man After Midnight)"	ABBA
