= The Magic Lanterns =

1960s English music group

- Origin: Warrington, Lancashire, England
- Genres: Pop, rock, soft rock, jazz rock
- Years active: 1962–1972
- Labels: CBS, Atlantic, Big Tree, Charisma
- Past members: Jimmy Bilsbury/Pilsbury; Peter Shoesmith; Ian Moncur; Allan Wilson; Alistair/Les Beveridge; Peter Garner; Mike "Oz" Osborne; Harry Paul Ward; Kevin Godley; Lol Creme; Steve Rowland; Albert Hammond; Christopher Wren

The Magic Lanterns were an English pop rock/soft rock group that formed in Warrington, Lancashire.

== Career ==
They formed in 1962 as The Sabres, playing locally in Manchester and changing their name a few years later. They signed to CBS Records after releasing a single, "Excuse Me Baby", which charted at No. 44 in the UK in 1966, and a few singles later they put out an album, Lit Up. In 1968 they switched to Atlantic Records and released their first US hit, "Shame, Shame", which peaked at No. 29 on the Hot 100, No. 5 on WLS, and No. 3 on Canada's RPM Charts. "Shame, Shame" was also released in the UK, on the short lived 'Camp' record label, as was "Melt All Your Troubles Away" the following year, but neither enjoyed any chart success. The single "Give Me Love" followed, as did a Stateside album. Changing record labels again in 1970 to Big Tree Records, a second album followed, but it would be their last.

In early 1970 lead singer-songwriter Jimmy Bilsbury quit the group to co-found the Les Humphries Singers with bandleader/songwriter Les Humphries. Most of the other members left soon after Bilsbury's departure for careers in other fields. Songwriter Albert Hammond, however, went on to further renown, and bassist Mike "Oz" Osborne would spend several decades fighting the mistaken impression that Ozzy Osbourne had actually played in his early career with the Lanterns.

The group had two more minor hits in the US, "One Night Stand" (No. 74, 1971) and "Country Woman" (No. 88, 1972). In 1972 the band released further singles on Polydor label in the UK, none of which met with chart success.

== Members ==
Early members

- Jimmy Bilsbury/Pilsbury – vocals, guitar
- Peter Shoesmith – guitar
- Ian Moncur – bass guitar
- Allan Wilson – drums

Later members

- Alistair/Les Beveridge – vocals, guitar
- Peter Garner – vocals, guitar
- Mike "Oz" Osborne – vocals, bass
- Henry Paul Ward – vocals, drums
- Kevin Godley
- Lol Creme
- Steve Rowland
- Albert Hammond
- Christopher Wren - vocals
- Mitch Mitchinson – guitar

== Discography ==
=== Albums ===
- Lit Up – With the Magic Lanterns (UK only, CBS Records 1968)
- Shame, Shame (U.S. only, Atlantic Records, 1969)
- One Night Stand (Big Tree Records, 1970)

=== UK singles ===
- "Excuse Me Baby" / "Greedy Girl" (CBS 1966)
- "Rumplestiltskin" / "I Stumbled" (CBS 1966)
- "Knight in Rusty Armour" / "Simple Things" (CBS 1966)
- "Auntie Grizelda" / "Time Will Tell (If I'm a Loser)" (CBS 1967)
- "We'll Meet Again" / "What Else Can It Be But Love" (CBS 1967)
- "Shame, Shame" / "Baby I Gotta Go Now" (Camp 1968)
- "Melt All Your Troubles Away" / "Bossa Nova 1940 – Hello You Lovers" (Camp 1969)
- "One Night Stand" / "Frisco Annie" (Polydor 1970)
- "Stand for Our Rights" / "Pa Bradley" (Polydor 1973)
