= Jimmy Bilsbury =

- Also known as: Jimmy Pilsbury
- Born: James Robert Bilsbury; 2 November 1942; Liverpool, England
- Died: 10 March 2003 (aged 60) Bonn, Germany
- Occupations: Singer, songwriter
- Formerly of: The Magic Lanterns; Les Humphries Singers

James Robert Bilsbury (2 November 1942 – 10 March 2003) was an English singer and songwriter from Liverpool, known as lead vocalist for the pop groups the Magic Lanterns and the Les Humphries Singers.

After appearing with the Ray Johnson Skiffle Group, the Nightboppers, the Beat Boys, the Sabres and the Hammers, and singing and writing for the Magic Lanterns, Bilsbury co-founded the Les Humphries Singers in 1969 in Munich, with fellow Briton Humphries. He was a member when they represented Germany in the 1976 Eurovision Song Contest with "Sing Sang Song". Bilsbury also performed with Megaton.

Bilsbury also co-wrote "Belfast" in 1971 with singer songwriter Drafi Deutscher and Joe Menke for Marcia Barrett, later a part of Frank Farian's disco formation, Boney M. Farian also recorded a German version of "Belfast" with Gilla in 1976 before the Boney M. version in 1977 that became a hit.

Bilsbury, who according to Neue Revue had been living on social welfare, was found dead in his 8 square metres (86 sq ft) apartment in Bonn on 13 March 2003, and the post mortem established that he had died three days earlier from heart failure. He was cremated and his ashes were buried in Gauting Waldfriedhof near Munich, at a ceremony attended by his 16-year-old son.
