= Baby Do You Wanna Bump =

"Baby, Do You Wanna Bump"

Single by Boney M.

from the album Take the Heat off Me
- Released: February 1975
- Recorded: December 1974
- Genre: Eurodisco
- Length: 3:35
- Label: Hansa (FRG); Creole (UK)
- Songwriter(s): Zambi (Frank Farian), George Reyam
- Producer(s): Frank Farian

Boney M. singles chronology
"Baby, Do You Wanna Bump" (1975)	"Daddy Cool" (1976)

Music video
- "Baby, Do You Wanna Bump" (TopPop, 1975) on YouTube

"Baby, Do You Wanna Bump" is a song recorded by German record producer Frank Farian under the name Boney M., and included on the group's 1976 debut album Take the Heat off Me. Released as the first Boney M. single, it became a minor hit in the Netherlands and Belgium, prompting Farian to create a proper group to promote his studio project. In the United Kingdom, the single was released by Creole Records, but went unnoticed.

== Concept and release ==
"Baby, Do You Wanna Bump" - a remake of Prince Buster's 1960s song "Al Capone" - was written by producer Frank Farian under the pseudonym Zambi, with Farian himself doing the deep male lead vocal, as well as the high falsetto backing vocals. George Reyam was also credited as a composer on Part II, but the label did not mention Prince Buster, who had written "Al Capone". When the song was included on the Boney M. debut album Take the Heat off Me, Farian joined the A- and B-sides of the original single (Parts I & II) together and created an extended album version. (On most single editions, the title is Baby, Do You Wanna Bump but on the album the title is Baby Do You Wanna Bump. Many YouTube uploads of the song and online articles have included a question mark at the end of the title, despite the single cover and the single itself not having one.)

The track was not included on the UK, US, Brazilian and Japanese versions of that album, since the recording was still licensed to Creole Records, and it was replaced on those pressings by "Help Help", a Farian composition previously released by Austrian singer Gilla.

When Boney M. topped the UK charts with "Rivers of Babylon" and "Brown Girl in the Ring" in 1978, Creole Records re-issued "Baby, Do You Wanna Bump" as a 12" single there. The running times of the 7" and 12" singles were unchanged— 3:40 for part 1 and 3:00 for part 2— although the German-released 7" single had a slightly longer part 2 on the B-side with a running time of 3:13.

== Charts ==
Chart performance for "Baby Do You Wanna Bump"
Chart (1976)	Peak position
Belgium (Ultratop 50 Flanders)	8
Netherlands (Single Top 100)	12
