= The Magic of Boney M. – 20 Golden Hits =

The Magic of Boney M.: 20 Golden Hits

Greatest hits album by Boney M.
- Released: 3 April 1980
- Recorded: 1976–1980
- Genres: Eurodisco; reggae; R&B
- Length: 71:49
- Labels: Atlantic; Hansa
- Producer: Frank Farian

Boney M. chronology
Oceans of Fantasy (1979)	The Magic of Boney M.: 20 Golden Hits; (1980)	Children of Paradise – The Greatest Hits of Boney M. – Vol. 2 (1981)

Alternative cover
- 1992 BMG-Ariola CD re-release

Singles from The Magic of Boney M. – 20 Golden Hits
- 1. "I See a Boat on the River / My Friend Jack" Released: April 1980

Professional ratings
Review scores
Source	Rating
Allmusic	4/5 stars

The Magic of Boney M. – 20 Golden Hits is a greatest hits album by Euro-Caribbean group Boney M., issued in 1980, which contained all their biggest hits up until that point, including non-album singles "Mary's Boy Child/Oh My Lord" and "Hooray! Hooray! It's a Holi-Holiday", album tracks from Take the Heat off Me, Love for Sale, Nightflight to Venus and Oceans of Fantasy as well as their most recent double A-side single release "I See a Boat On the River"/ "My Friend Jack".

The Magic of Boney M. – 20 Golden Hits entered the UK charts at number 18 on 12 April 1980, and peaked at number one on 17 May 1980, becoming their third consecutive UK number one album. In Germany, it was released towards the end of April, and entered the German album charts at number three on 5 May 1980, peaking at number two the following week, and staying in the charts for a total of 25 weeks.

== Track listing ==
Side A:

1. "Rivers of Babylon" (Dowe, McNaughton, Farian, Reyam) – 3:59
  - Slightly edited 7" mix
2. "Daddy Cool" (Farian, Reyam) – 3:25
  - Original album and single version
3. "Sunny" (Bobby Hebb) – 3:14
  - Edited version
4. "Belfast" (Billsbury, Deutscher, Menke) – 2:25
  - Edited version
5. "El Lute" (Farian, Jay, Blum) – 4:24
  - Edited version
6. "No Woman, No Cry" (Ford, Bob Marley) – 2:58
  - Edited version
7. "Rasputin" (Farian, Jay, Reyam) – 3:40
  - Edited 7" version (Replaced with album version on Canadian LP pressing)
8. "Painter Man" (Phillips, Pickett) – 3:10
  - Original album version
9. "Ma Baker" (Farian, Jay, Reyam) – 3:44
  - Edited version
10. "Gotta Go Home" (Farian, Jay, Huth, Huth) – 3:45
  - Album version

Side B:

1. "My Friend Jack" (The Smoke) – 4:31
  - Slightly edited 7" mix
2. "I See a Boat on the River" (Farian, Jay, Rulofs) – 4:04
  - Edited early 7" mix. N.B. 1992 CD edition: edited version – 3:10, taken from Fantastic Boney M.
3. "Brown Girl in the Ring" (Farian) – 3:06
  - Edited version
4. "Mary's Boy Child – Oh My Lord" (Jester Hairston, Farian, Jay, Lorin) – 4:31
  - Edited version
5. "Bahama Mama" (Farian, Jay) – 3:17
  - Edited 7" version
6. "I'm Born Again" (Jay, Rulofs) – 3:57
  - Slightly edited 7" mix
7. "Oceans of Fantasy" (Kawohl, Jay, Zill) – 3:19
  - Edited version
8. "Ribbons of Blue" (Keith Forsey) – 3:04
  - Edited 7" mix
9. "Still I'm Sad" (McCarthy, Samwell-Smith) – 3:40
  - Edited version
10. "Hooray! Hooray! It's a Holi-Holiday" (Farian, Jay) – 3:11
  - Edited version

== Alternate editions ==
'Greatest Hits Of Boney M.' (German Club Edition LP)
Side A:

1. "Sunny" (Bobby Hebb) – 3:14
2. "Daddy Cool" (Farian, Reyam) – 3:25
3. "Belfast" (Billsbury, Deutscher, Menke) – 2:25
4. "Ma Baker" (Farian, Jay, Reyam) – 3:44
5. "El Lute" (Farian, Jay, Blum) – 4:24
6. "Rasputin" (Farian, Jay, Reyam) – 3:40
7. "I'm Born Again" (Jay, Rulofs) – 3:57
8. "Bahama Mama" (Farian, Jay) – 3:17

Side B:

1. "I See a Boat on the River" (Farian, Jay, Rulofs) – 4:04
2. "My Friend Jack" (The Smoke) – 4:31
3. "Gotta Go Home" (Farian, Jay, Huth, Huth) – 3:45
4. "Rivers of Babylon" (Farian, Reyam) – 3:59
5. "Mary's Boy Child/Oh My Lord" (Jester Hairston, Farian, Jay, Lorin) – 4:31
6. "Brown Girl in the Ring" (Farian) – 3:06
7. "Ribbons of Blue" (Keith Forsey) – 3:04
8. "Hooray! Hooray! It's a Holi-Holiday" (Farian, Jay) – 3:11

== Personnel ==
- Liz Mitchell – lead vocals (A1, A3, A5, A6, A8, B2, B3, B4, B6, B8, B9 & B10), backing vocals
- Marcia Barrett – lead vocals (A4), backing vocals
- Frank Farian – lead vocals (A2, A5, A7, A9, A10, B6 & B7), backing vocals

(track denotations refer to original Hansa issue)

== Production ==
- Frank Farian – producer

== Charts ==
=== Weekly charts ===
Chart (1980)	Peak position
Australian Albums (Kent Music Report)	3
Austrian Albums (Ö3 Austria)	5
Canada Top Albums/CDs (RPM)	16
Finnish Albums (Suomen virallinen lista)	5
Dutch Albums (Album Top 100)	2
German Albums (Offizielle Top 100)	2
Norwegian Albums (VG-lista)	14
Swedish Albums (Sverigetopplistan)	30
UK Albums (Official Charts)	1

=== Year-end charts ===
Chart (1980)	Position
Austrian Albums (Ö3 Austria)	18
Dutch Albums (Album Top 100)	18
German Albums (Offizielle Top 100)	23
New Zealand Albums (RMNZ)	26
Chart (1981)	Position
Canada Top Albums/CDs (RPM)	87

== Certifications ==
Region	Certification	Certified units/sales
Canada (Music Canada)	Platinum	100,000^{^}
Finland (Musiikkituottajat)	Gold	25,000
Germany (BVMI)	Gold	250,000^{^}
Hong Kong (IFPI Hong Kong)	Platinum	20,000^{*}
Netherlands (NVPI)	Platinum	100,000^{^}
New Zealand (RMNZ)	Platinum	15,000^{^}
Spain (Promusicae)	Platinum	100,000^{^}
United Kingdom (BPI)	Gold	100,000^{^}
^{*} Sales figures based on certification alone.^{^} Shipments figures based on certification alone.

== Sources and external links ==
- Rate Your Music, detailed discography
- The Magic of Boney M. – 20 Golden Hits at Discogs (list of releases)
- Allmusic, biography, discography etc.
