= Gilla (singer) =

- Born: Gisela Wuchinger; 27 February 1950 (age 76)
- Origin: Linz, Austria
- Genres: Disco, Schlager
- Occupation: Singer
- Years active: 1974–1981
- Labels: Hansa Records, MCI Records

Gilla ([ˈdʒiːla]; born Gisela Wuchinger [ˈvʊχɪŋɐ], 27 February 1950) is an Austrian singer from the late 1970s disco era.

== History ==
Gilla was discovered by German producer Frank Farian who got her signed to Hansa Records in 1974. After an unsuccessful German cover version "Mir ist kein Weg zu weit" of Marcella Bella's Italian hit single "Nessuno mai", Farian had her record a German disco version of Labelle's "Lady Marmalade". Despite being a modest hit (No. 24), it drew some media attention in Germany from being the first cover with the same explicit lyrics "Willst du mit mir schlafen gehn?" (Do You Want to Sleep with Me) (1975). It was followed later in the year with "Tu es" (recorded in English as "Why Don't You Do It") which became Gilla's biggest hit, peaking at No. 10 in the German charts and giving Farian a commercial breakthrough as a producer. Gilla's debut LP, featuring a mix of disco, pop and schlager tracks, was released shortly after.

In the summer of 1976, Gilla followed with the single, "Ich brenne" (I'm Burning), and re-recorded in English as "Help Help". It was a hit in Holland but fared less well in Germany. Farian remixed the track with his own vocals for Boney M.'s Take the Heat Off Me which replaced "Baby Do You Wanna Bump" in some territories. In early 1977, Gilla's second album Zieh mich aus (Undress Me) was released. Despite featuring German versions of Boney M.'s hit single "Sunny" and Bob Marley's "No Woman No Cry", it fared poorly. The album also included the German version of a future hit for Boney M., "Belfast" which was originally written years earlier for Boney M. member Marcia Barrett.
Gilla's first international album was released in the summer of 1977. Entitled Help Help, it featured her previous English recordings like "Why Don't You Do It" and "Help Help" + their B-sides, as well as English versions of songs from Zieh mich aus. "Gentlemen Callers not Allowed" ("Herrn-Besuche nicht erlaubt") was released as a single and promoted with Boney M.'s charismatic male dancer Bobby Farrell on a few TV shows but it was still only a minor success.

In January 1978, Gilla released a disco-rock cover of The American Breed's "Bend Me, Shape Me". The single was a No. 11 hit in Switzerland and 73 in Australia, and she also performed it in a medley with Boney M. It was decided to repackage the Help Help album with the inclusion of the new track and its B-side "The River Sings" ("Der Strom der Zeit") in May, entitled Bend Me, Shape Me. Once again, it was only a minor seller. Singer Bruce Low released a big-selling German cover of Boney M.'s mega-hit "Rivers of Babylon" so Farian decided to have Gilla record a German cover of the follow-up single "Rasputin". Released in November 1978, it was a flop and not even included on the following compilation Star Discothek a few months later.

Trying to repeat the success of "Bend Me, Shape Me", Gilla and her fiancé and co-producer Helmut Rulofs (who was also a recording artist under the name Chris Denning) released another disco-rock cover of The Animals's "We Gotta Get Out of This Place" in March 1979. In 1980, her second English language album Cool Rock'n Roll was released including the title track single and "Go Down Mainstreet" backed by "Discothek" (A cover of Carole Kings 1978 "Disco Tech") along with her single "Tom Cat" backed by "The Summer wind". In October 1981, Gilla released her final single "Cigarillo" backed with a cover of "Friday on My Mind". Following the release of her final single, Gilla retired from her solo career and began collaborating on various Farian and Rulof productions.

Gilla and Rulofs found larger success when Farian recorded one of their songs with Boney M. "I See a Boat on the River". This track became a German Top 10 hit and a European hit single from the million-selling The Magic of Boney M. - 20 Golden Hits. Gilla, however, was credited on this track as G. Winger (An abbreviation of her surname, Wuchinger). Gilla and Rulofs wrote other tracks for various Farian artists such as Milli Vanilli, Precious Wilson, Boney M. and Eruption.

Despite retiring in 1981, Gilla would continue to appear in other Helmut Rulofs projects. These projects would include Sweet Mix, Casablanca, Jet Society, and Vanilla. Most of these projects would find little to moderate success, mostly in Germany and Italy. Gilla was previously associated with a short-lived touring group by the name of Donau Wellen and originally performed as Seventy-Five Music & Gilla.

Gilla and Rulofs also contributed the track "Video" for Precious Wilson's album All Coloured in Love in 1982.

Being largely forgotten in Europe today, Gilla has remained relatively popular in Russia. "Johnny" became a classic for Russian dance music. In 1997, she alongside Rulofs and daughter, Nadja, embarked on a trip to Ekaterinburg, Russia, where they were warmly welcomed. Gilla and Rulofs also performed a live concert which included unpublished dance tracks. Gilla returned to Russia in both 2007 and 2015 to perform live at the Disco of the 80's Festival.

== Discography ==
=== Albums ===
- Willst du mit mir schlafen gehn? (1975)
- Zieh mich aus (1976)
- Help Help (1977) – re-released as Bend Me, Shape Me (1978)
- I Like Some Cool Rock'n Roll (1980)

=== Singles ===
- "Mir ist kein Weg zu weit" / "Wilde Rosen" (1974)
- "Willst du mit mir schlafen gehn?" / "Atlantika" (1975)
- "Do You Want to Sleep With Me" / "My Decision" (1975)
- "Tu es" / "Worte" (1975)
- "Why Don't You Do It" / "A Baby of Love" (1975)
- "Ich brenne" / "Du bist nicht die erste Liebe" (1976)
- "Help Help" / "First Love" (1976)
- "Johnny" / "Der Strom der Zeit" (1976)
- "Zieh mich aus" / "Lieben und frei sein" (1977)
- "Gentlemen Callers not Allowed" / "Say Yes" (1977)
- "Bend Me, Shape Me" / "The River Sings" (1978) – AUS #73
- "Rasputin" (German Version) / "Laß mich gehen" (1978)
- "We Gotta Get Out of This Place" / "Take The Best of Me" (1979)
- "I Like Some Cool Rock 'n Roll" / "Take Your Time" (1980)
- "Go Down Mainstreet" / "Discothek" (1980)
- "Tom Cat" / "The Summerwind" (1980)
- "Cigarillo" / "Friday on My Mind" (1981)
