= I'm Born Again/Bahama Mama =

"I'm Born Again" / "Bahama Mama"

Single by Boney M

from the album Oceans of Fantasy
- Released: 30 November 1979
- Recorded: 1979
- Genre: Pop, Euro disco
- Label: Hansa Records (FRG)
- Producer(s): Frank Farian

Boney M singles chronology
"El Lute / Gotta Go Home" (1979)	"I'm Born Again" / "Bahama Mama" (1979)	"I See a Boat on the River" / "My Friend Jack" (1980)

"I'm Born Again" / "Bahama Mama" is a double A-side single by German band Boney M. It was the second single from their fourth album Oceans of Fantasy (1979), not withcounting a promotional-only single release of "Let It All Be Music" and the album title track. Not as successful as previous singles, the ballad "I'm Born Again" peaked at #7 in Germany. In the UK, it stalled at No. 35 after 10 consecutive Top 20 singles. Over the ensuing years, Boney M. would employ the double A-side format, typically with the A1 song being the song intended for radio and the A2 song being more specifically targeted at discos. Typically, the sides on the coordinating 12" single would be reversed.

== "I'm Born Again" ==
"I'm Born Again" was based on an Irish folksong "Buachaill Ón Éirne", the lyrics reflecting lead singer Liz Mitchell's growing religious belief. The single featured a different and slightly longer mix than the album version.

=== Charts ===
Chart performance for "I'm Born Again"
Chart (1979)	Peak position
Austria (Ö3 Austria Top 40)	9
Ireland (IRMA)	12
Sweden (Sverigetopplistan)	17
Switzerland (Schweizer Hitparade)	6
UK Singles (OCC)	35
West Germany (GfK)	7

== "Bahama Mama" ==
This disco track was also featured in a slightly longer mix than the album pressings. The snarling, spoken passage in the middle (the voice of "Bahama Mama") was done by Linda Blake who had also done the voice of Ma Baker.

In Japan, this song is used frequently for Bon Odori since the 1990s.

=== Charts ===
Chart performance for "Bahama Mama"
Chart (1979)	Peak position
Austria (Ö3 Austria Top 40)	12
Finland (Suomen virallinen)	5

== Releases ==
7" single

- "I'm Born Again" (Single mix) (Helmut Rulofs, Fred Jay) – 4:17 / "Bahama Mama" (Single mix) (Frank Farian, Fred Jay) – 3:35 (Hansa 101 101-100, Germany)
- "Bahama Mama" (LP mix) – 3:17 / "I'm Born Again" (LP mix) – 4:08 (Atlantic P-513A, Japan)

12" single

- "Bahama Mama" (Long Version) – 5:12 / "I'm Born Again" – 4:17 (Hansa 600 166-213, Germany)

== Charts ==
Chart performance for "I'm Born Again"/"Bahama Mama"
Chart (1979)	Peak position
Belgium (VRT Top 30 Flanders)	16
Netherlands (Dutch Top 40)	7
