= Love for Sale (Boney M. album) =

- Standard edition album cover

Studio album by Boney M.
- Released: May 2, 1977
- Recorded: August 1976 – March 1977
- Genres: Eurodisco; reggae
- Length: 41:17
- Labels: Atlantic; Hansa
- Producer: Frank Farian

Boney M. chronology
| Take the Heat off Me (1976) | Love for Sale (1977) | Nightflight to Venus (1978) |

Singles from Love for Sale
- 1. "Ma Baker" Released: May 2, 1977; 2. "Still I'm Sad" Released: May 1977; 3. "Belfast" Released: September 19, 1977

Professional ratings
Review scores
| Source | Rating |
|---|---|
| AllMusic | 2.5/5 stars |

Love for Sale is the second studio album by Euro-Caribbean group Boney M. The album includes the hits "Ma Baker" and "Belfast". It also includes three covers: "Love for Sale" (by Cole Porter), "Have You Ever Seen the Rain?" (by Creedence Clearwater Revival), and "Still I'm Sad" (by The Yardbirds).

This was the last Boney M. album without different edits on LP and cassette like Nightflight to Venus and Oceans of Fantasy.

== Artwork ==
The standard cover art features the male member Bobby Farrell "naked [with] a futuristic golden thong" chaining female members, resembling African sexual slaves. American label Atlantic Records found the cover "raunchy", so they used the standard back cover of a vinyl sleeve featuring the band wearing clothes as the alternative front cover of American and Canadian edition. One of the female group members, Liz Mitchell, told The Sydney Morning Herald:

They wanted to photograph us all totally naked in chains with [band member Bobby Farrell] standing over us like it was bondage[...] I wept—trust me. When they showed us the costumes, it was just heavy gold chains.

The front cover of the South Korean vinyl edition features the band in one live performance, and the back cover of the edition features the band in a studio photo session.

== Track listing ==
Side A

1. "Ma Baker" (Frank Farian, Fred Jay, George Reyam) – 4:36
2. "Love for Sale" (Cole Porter) – 4:47
3. "Belfast" (Jimmy Bilsbury, Drafi Deutscher, Joe Menke) – 3:31
  "Daddy Cool" (U.S. edition only) from the previous album Take the Heat off Me – 3:27
4. "Have You Ever Seen the Rain?" (John Fogerty) – 2:40
5. "Gloria, Can You Waddle" (Farian, Reyam) – 3:57

Side B

1. "Plantation Boy" (Jay, King) – 4:27
2. "Motherless Child" (Farian, Liz Mitchell) – 4:58
3. "Silent Lover" (Farian, Keith Forsey, Jay) – 4:14
4. "A Woman Can Change a Man" (Farian, Jay) – 3:33
5. "Still I'm Sad" (Jim McCarty, Paul Samwell-Smith) – 4:34

== Personnel ==
- Liz Mitchell – lead vocals (tracks A2, A4, B1, B2, B4, B5), backing vocals
- Marcia Barrett – lead vocals (tracks A3, B3), backing vocals
- Frank Farian – lead vocals (A5), backing vocals
- Linda Blake – voice of "Ma Baker" on A1
- Bill Swisher – speaker voice on A1
- The Rhythm Machine – musicians
- Gary Unwinn – bass guitar
- Keith Forsey – drums
- Todd Canedy – drums
- Nick Woodland – guitar
- Johan Daansen – guitar
- Thor Baldursson – keyboards
- The Black Beautiful Circus – performers on tracks A5 and B5

=== Production ===
- Frank Farian – producer
- Stefan/Stephen Klinkhammer – arranger, conductor
- Christian Kolonovits – arranger
- Johann Daansen – arranger
- Thor Baldursson – arranger
- Fred Schreier – sound engineer
- Hartmut Pfannmüller – sound engineer
- John Lund – sound engineer
- Michael Lammert – sound engineer
- Recorded and mixed at Union Studios, Munich, and Europe Sound Studios, Offenbach.

== Charts ==
=== Weekly charts ===
Weekly chart performance for Love for Sale
| Chart (1977–79) | Peak position |
|---|---|
| Argentinian Albums | 5 |
| Australian Albums (Kent Music Report) | 27 |
| Austrian Albums (Ö3 Austria) | 1 |
| Belgian Albums (HUMO) | 1 |
| Dutch Albums (Album Top 100) | 2 |
| Finnish Albums (Suomen virallinen lista) | 1 |
| German Albums (Offizielle Top 100) | 1 |
| Italian Albums (Musica e dischi) | 3 |
| New Zealand Albums (RMNZ) | 22 |
| Norwegian Albums (VG-lista) | 2 |
| Swedish Albums (Sverigetopplistan) | 1 |
| UK Albums (Official Charts) | 13 |

=== Year-end charts ===
1977 year-end chart performance for Love for Sale
| Chart (1977) | Position |
|---|---|
| Austrian Albums (Ö3 Austria) | 3 |
| Dutch Albums (Album Top 100) | 10 |
| German Albums (Offizielle Top 100) | 19 |

1978 year-end chart performance for Love for Sale
| Chart (1978) | Position |
|---|---|
| German Albums (Offizielle Top 100) | 40 |

== Certifications and sales ==
| Region | Certification | Certified units/sales |
|---|---|---|
| Canada combined sales with first album | — | 48,000 |
| Denmark & Sweden | — | 250,000 |
| Finland (Musiikkituottajat) | Gold | 26,218 |
| France | — | 250,000 |
| Germany (BVMI) | Platinum | 500,000^{^} |
| Greece (IFPI Greece) | Gold | 50,000^{^} |
| Hong Kong (IFPI Hong Kong) | Platinum | 20,000^{*} |
| Israel | 2× Gold | 40,000 |
| Netherlands | — | 100,000 |
| Spain combined sales with first album | — | 300,000 |
| Sweden (GLF) | Gold | 50,000^{^} |
| United Kingdom (BPI) | Gold | 100,000^{^} |
^{*} Sales figures based on certification alone.^{^} Shipments figures based on certification alone.

== Reissued ==
- 1994: CD, BMG 74321 21270 2
- 2007: CD, Sony BMG Music Entertainment 88697082612
- 2011: Boney M. Original Album Classics, 5 × CD box set, Sony Music 88697928702
- 2017: Boney M. Complete, 9 × LP box set, Sony Music 88985406971
