= Take the Heat off Me =

Studio album by Boney M.
- Released: June 28, 1976
- Recorded: December 1974 – April 1976
- Genres: Eurodisco; reggae
- Length: 36:05
- Labels: Atlantic; Atco; Hansa
- Producer: Frank Farian

Boney M. chronology
Take the Heat off Me (1976)	Love for Sale (1977)

Singles from Take the Heat off Me
- 1. "Baby Do You Wanna Bump" Released: February 1975; 2. "Daddy Cool" Released: May 31, 1976; 3. "Sunny" Released: November 22, 1976

Professional ratings
Review scores
Source	Rating
AllMusic	3/5 stars
Christgau's Record Guide	B
The Rolling Stone Record Guide	1/5 stars

Take the Heat off Me is the debut album by Euro-Caribbean group Boney M. The album became a major seller in Europe, specifically in the Nordic countries (number 1 in Sweden and Finland, number 2 in Norway), but in the U.S. the album just missed the album chart. Tracks include the hits "Daddy Cool" (number 1 in eight European countries, number 65 on the Billboard Hot 100), "Sunny" (top 5 in many European countries) and the debut single "Baby Do You Wanna Bump".

== Additional information ==
Producer Frank Farian was in a hurry to capitalize on the sudden success of "Daddy Cool" and put together the first Boney M. album quickly, made possible by the use of cover versions and by reusing already existing recordings.

While "Baby Do You Wanna Bump" was reworked from Prince Buster's "Al Capone" (although credited to Farian's alias 'Zambi'), "Sunny", "No Woman No Cry" and "Fever" are cover versions of well-known tracks, albeit rearranged. The title track "Take the Heat off Me" is also a cover, of the 1974 Italian hit "Nessuno mai" ("No one ever") by Italian artist Marcella Bella.

Versions of three tracks had previously been released by another Farian produced artist Gilla in German, "Take the Heat off Me" ("Mir ist kein weg zu weit"), "Lovin' or Leavin'" ("Lieben und frei sein") and the UK/US exclusive "Help, Help" ("Ich brenne"), the last of which Gilla also recorded in English. Gilla would furthermore record German versions of "Sunny" and "No Woman No Cry", using the same backing tracks. The B-side of the single "Sunny" and the non-album track "New York City" also recycle two of Gilla's tracks: "Tu Es" (English version "Why Don't You Do It") and "Ich brenne" ("Help, Help!"). "Got a Man on My Mind" was rewritten from Farian's "Am Samstagabend", which was the B-side of his 1976 hit single "Rocky".

All in all, "Daddy Cool" is in fact the only truly original track on the album.

== Track listing ==
Side A

1. "Daddy Cool" (Frank Farian, George Reyam (Hans-Jörg Mayer)) – 3:29
2. "Take the Heat off Me" (Bigazzi, Gianni Bella) – 4:47
3. "Sunny" (Bobby Hebb) – 4:03
4. "Baby Do You Wanna Bump" (Zambi (Frank Farian)) – 6:53

Side B

1. "No Woman No Cry" (Vincent Ford, Bob Marley) – 4:59
2. "Fever" (Eddie Cooley, John Davenport) – 4:00
3. "Got a Man on My Mind" (Frank Farian, Fred Jay) – 3:25
4. "Lovin' or Leavin'" (Frank Farian, Fred Jay) – 4:29

== Personnel ==
Musicians

- Liz Mitchell – lead vocals (tracks A3, B1, B2 & B3), backing vocals
- Marcia Barrett – lead vocals (tracks A2 & B4), backing vocals
- Frank Farian – lead vocals (tracks A1 & A4), backing vocals
- The Rhythm Machine – musicians
- Gary Unwin – bass guitar
- Keith Forsey – drums
- Nick Woodland – guitar
- Thor Baldursson – keyboards

Production

- Frank Farian – producer
- Steven Hammer (Stefan Klinkhammer) – arranger, conductor
- Recorded at Union Studios, Munich and Europasound Studios, Frankfurt

== Charts ==
=== Weekly charts ===
Weekly chart performance for Take the Heat off Me
Chart (1976–1977)	Peak position
Argentinian Albums (Centro Cultural del Disco)	21
Australian Albums (Kent Music Report)	26
Austrian Albums (Ö3 Austria)	6
Dutch Albums (Album Top 100)	5
Finnish Albums (Suomen virallinen lista)	1
German Albums (Offizielle Top 100)	2
Italian Albums (Musica e dischi)	8
New Zealand Albums (RMNZ)	34
Norwegian Albums (VG-lista)	2
Swedish Albums (Sverigetopplistan)	1
UK Albums (Official Charts)	40

=== Year-end charts ===
Year-end chart performance for Take the Heat off Me
Chart (1977)	Position
Austrian Albums (Ö3 Austria)	13
Dutch Albums (Album Top 100)	41
German Albums (Offizielle Top 100)	3

== Certifications ==
Certifications for Take the Heat off Me
Region	Certification	Certified units/sales
Canada combined sales with second album	—	48,000
Denmark (IFPI Danmark)	Silver	25,000
Finland (Musiikkituottajat)	Gold	26,259
France	—	300,000
Germany (BVMI)	Gold	250,000^{^}
Greece (IFPI Greece)	Gold	50,000^{^}
Hong Kong (IFPI Hong Kong)	Platinum	20,000^{*}
Spain combined sales with first album	—	300,000
Sweden (GLF)	Platinum	100,000^{^}
United Kingdom (BPI)	Silver	60,000^{^}
^{*} Sales figures based on certification alone.^{^} Shipments figures based on certification alone.

== Reissued ==
- 1994: CD, BMG 74321 21271 2
- 2007: CD, Sony BMG Music Entertainment 88697082602
- 2011: Boney M. Original Album Classics, 5 × CD box set, Sony Music 88697928702
- 2017: Boney M. Complete, 9 × LP box set, Sony Music 88985406971
