= Nightflight to Venus =

Studio album by Boney M.
- Released: 23 June 1978
- Recorded: 1977–1978
- Genres: Eurodisco; reggae; Funk
- Length: 44:37
- Labels: Atlantic; Sire; Hansa
- Producer: Frank Farian

Boney M. chronology
Love for Sale (1977)	Nightflight to Venus (1978)	Oceans of Fantasy (1979)

Singles from Nightflight to Venus
- 1. "Rivers of Babylon" Released: April 1978; 2. "Rasputin" Released: August 1978; 3. "Painter Man" Released: February 1979; 4. "Voodoonight" Released: 1979

Professional ratings
Review scores
Source	Rating
AllMusic	3/5 stars
Christgau's Record Guide	B−

Nightflight to Venus is the third studio album by Euro-Caribbean group Boney M., and was released in June 1978. The album became a major success in continental Europe, Scandinavia, and Canada, topping most of the album charts during the second half of 1978 and also became their first UK number one album. In Canada, it received a nomination for a 1980 Juno Award in a category 'International Album of the Year'.

Nightflight to Venus includes the worldwide hits "Rivers of Babylon" and "Brown Girl in the Ring", a double A-sided single that topped the UK singles chart and has sold over 2 million copies there. The follow-up was another Boney M. classic, "Rasputin", in most countries also a double A-side coupled with "Painter Man", a cover of a 1966 hit by the band the Creation. In the UK, "Rasputin" and "Painter Man" were released separately as A-sides by Atlantic Records, both reaching the Top 10. "Rivers of Babylon", which peaked at No. 30 on The Billboard Hot 100, became their biggest US hit.

== Album information ==
In Europe and most other parts of the world, the album was followed in November 1978 by the Christmas single, "Mary's Boy Child / Oh My Lord" backed with "Dancing in the Streets", another chart topper – selling over 1.86 million copies in the UK alone. Upon its original 1978 release, these two tracks did not appear on Nightflight to Venus, but they were included on the 2007 CD release of the album.

For the first time, there were four different pressings of the original Hansa Records LPs, all with slightly different versions of some tracks. The most significant difference was the length of the title track, "Nightflight to Venus". On the very first German pressing, it was 7:09 minutes, making the segued medley with the (also extended) "Rasputin" 13:48 in total, the second pressing 5:55, the third 4:58 and the final 4:46.

On the first pressing, "Rasputin" has a unique instrumental part within the last verse; also, the instrumental parts between verses are slightly longer than the other ones, which can also be heard on the 1988 remix. After the first (6:26) and second (6:04) pressing of the LP, the song's album version was shortened to 5:51.

A different mix for "He Was a Steppenwolf" and a slightly different version of "Voodoonight" was used on the first pressing compared to later ones.

The CD version from 1994 is the same as the fourth pressing of the album. On the 2007 reissue, two bonus tracks were added to the album.

On 10 November 2023, the group's YouTube channel released a video celebrating the 45th anniversary of the album. This was followed by a "visual album" series of music videos for every track from Nightlight to Venus; however, some songs are different versions (for example, "Rasputin" is the edited version from The Magic of Boney M. - 20 Golden Hits).

== Track listing ==
=== Side A ===
1. "Nightflight to Venus" (Frank Farian, Fred Jay, Dietmar Kawohl) – 4:46
2. "Rasputin" (Frank Farian, Fred Jay, George Reyam (Hans-Jörg Mayer)) – 5:51
3. "Painter Man" (Eddie Phillips, Kenny Pickett) – 3:10
4. "He Was a Steppenwolf" (Frank Farian, Fred Jay, Stefan Klinkhammer) – 6:51
5. "King of the Road" (Roger Miller) – 2:35

=== Side B ===
1. "Rivers of Babylon" (Brent Dowe, Trevor McNaughton, Frank Farian, George Reyam) – 4:21
2. "Voodoonight" (Giorgio Sgarbi) – 3:31
3. "Brown Girl in the Ring" (Traditional, Exuma; arranged by Frank Farian) – 4:02
4. "Never Change Lovers in the Middle of the Night" (Mats Björklund, Keith Forsey, Fred Jay) – 5:32
5. "Heart of Gold" (Neil Young) – 4:00

== Personnel ==
- Liz Mitchell – lead vocals (A3, B1, B3, B5), backing vocals
- Marcia Barrett – lead vocals (A1, A5, B4), backing vocals
- Frank Farian – lead vocals (A2, B2), backing vocals
- Bill Swisher – robot voice on A1, narrator on A2
- The Rhythm Machine – musicians
- Keith Forsey – drums
- Nick Woodland – guitar
- Mats Björklund – guitar
- Gary Unwin – bass guitar
- "Chico" de los Reyes – keyboards
- Bernd Kohn – marimba, percussion

== Production ==
- Frank Farian – producer
- Christian Kolonovits – arranger
- Johan Daansen – arranger
- Mats Björklund – arranger
- Michael Cretu – arranger
- Stefan Klinkhammer – arranger
- Fred Schreier – sound engineer
- Hartmut Pfannmüller – sound engineer
- John Lund – sound engineer
- Tammy Grohé – sound engineer
- Manfred Vormstein – art direction
- Didi Zill – photography
- Dengler/Kohlmeier – design
- Recorded at Europasound Studios, Offenbach and Union Studios, Munich
- Mixed at Europasound Studios, Offenbach

== Charts ==
=== Weekly charts ===
Weekly chart performance for Nightflight to Venus
Chart (1978–79)	Peak position
Argentinian Albums	5
Australian Albums (Kent Music Report)	7
Austrian Albums (Ö3 Austria)	1
Canada Top Albums/CDs (RPM)	7
Dutch Albums (Album Top 100)	1
Finnish Albums (Suomen virallinen lista)	2
German Albums (Offizielle Top 100)	1
Italian Albums (Musica e dischi)	8
New Zealand Albums (RMNZ)	3
Norwegian Albums (VG-lista)	1
Swedish Albums (Sverigetopplistan)	1
UK Albums (Official Charts)	1
US Billboard 200	134

=== Year-end charts ===
1978 year-end chart performance for Nightflight to Venus
Chart (1978)	Position
Australian Albums (Kent Music Report)	17
Austrian Albums (Ö3 Austria)	3
Dutch Albums (Album Top 100)	11
German Albums (Offizielle Top 100)	7
New Zealand Albums (RMNZ)	8

1979 year-end chart performance for Nightflight to Venus
Chart (1979)	Position
Canada Top Albums/CDs (RPM)	40
German Albums (Offizielle Top 100)	18
New Zealand Albums (RMNZ)	43

== Certifications and sales ==
Region	Certification	Certified units/sales
Austria (IFPI Austria)	Gold	25,000^{*}
Canada (Music Canada)	5× Platinum	700,000
Denmark	—	140,000
Germany (BVMI)	2× Platinum	1,000,000^{^}
Greece (IFPI Greece)	Platinum	100,000^{^}
Hong Kong (IFPI Hong Kong)	Platinum	20,000^{*}
Ireland	—	52,000
Netherlands (NVPI)	Gold	50,000^{^}
New Zealand (RMNZ)	Platinum	15,000^{^}
Spain (Promusicae)	Platinum	100,000^{^}
Switzerland	—	125,000
United Kingdom (BPI)	Platinum	300,000^{^}
^{*} Sales figures based on certification alone.^{^} Shipments figures based on certification alone.

== Reissued ==
- 1994: CD, BMG 74321 21269 2
- 2007: CD, Sony BMG Music Entertainment 88697082622
- 2011: Boney M. Original Album Classics, 5 × CD box set, Sony Music 88697928702
- 2017: Boney M. Complete, 9 × LP box set, Sony Music 88985406971
