= My Friend Jack =

1967 single by The Smoke

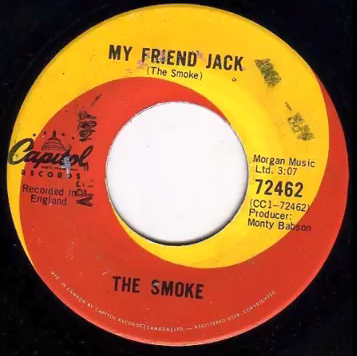

Single by The Smoke

from the album It's Smoke Time
- B-side: "We Can Take It"
- Released: 10 February 1967
- Recorded: 1966
- Genre: Psychedelic rock, freakbeat
- Length: 3:06 (single version); 3:09 (original version); 3:04 (1976 version)
- Label: Morgan Blue Town (UK) Columbia (EMI); Metronome (Germany); Impact Records (France); Capitol of Canada (Canada)
- Songwriters: Geoff Gill, Mal Luker, Zeke Lund and Mick Rowley
- Producers: The Smoke, Monty Babson

The Smoke singles chronology
"My Friend Jack" (1967)	"High in a Room" (1967)

"My Friend Jack" is a psychedelic rock song released by the English freakbeat group The Smoke in 1967. It was included originally in their debut album It's Smoke Time, and it was also included (among other compilation albums) in the collection Nuggets II: Original Artyfacts from the British Empire and Beyond, 1964–1969 (Rhino, 2001).

It was credited to all four band members: Geoff Gill, Mal Luker, Zeke Lund and Mick Rowley.

The song was later covered by Boney M.

== Background ==
"My Friend Jack" was the only international hit by The Smoke. The song seems to suggest the use of psychedelic drugs (specifically LSD) in lines such as "My Friend Jack eats sugar lumps" and suggests traversing the world inside his mind (such as "Been on a voyage, across an ocean").

The song was pulled off the U.K. market due to the drug connotations and it therefore never succeeded in their own country. The original content of the song was so unacceptable that "My Friend Jack" had to be rewritten before EMI would touch it; finally, it was released in February 1967. The single only made it to number 45 before being banned by the BBC, limiting it to three weeks on the U.K. charts.

The first version (somewhat slower and almost entirely modified except for the chorus) featured more obvious content related with the hallucinogenic effect and incomprehension. Lines such as "Oh, what beautiful things he sees" had to be re-recorded as "Sugarman hasn't got a care". The demo is available on some CD compilations, such as Real Life Permanent Dreams. A Cornucopia Of British Psychedelia (1965-1970) (Castle Select, 2007).

In mainland Europe, however, the final version of the record sold well; the group and their song was supported after appearing on an installment of the successful German television show Beat-Club, alongside Jimi Hendrix, The Who, and Cliff Bennett & the Rebel Rousers.

"My Friend Jack" ended up reaching the No. 2 spot in the German pop charts, and earned the Smoke a place on a tour with the Small Faces and the Beach Boys in 1967. The single charted high in Switzerland, France, and Austria as well, and suddenly there was demand for a Smoke LP in Germany, entitled later It's Smoke Time.

== Musical style ==
The song is characterized by a march beat and mix of shimmering and crunchy reverb-laden guitar (its most notable sound). It presents an aggressive riff, heavily influenced by The Who's power-chord and a trippy cheerfulness, like other songs with drug references from that era.

According to Matthew Greenwald in AllMusic: "The song opens with a tremolo-laden slide guitar riff from Mal Luker, which creates a trippy, unsettling but wholly interesting hook. The main melody is a bouncy, mid-tempo slice of pop-psychedelia, filled with a buoyancy that equates this to an English version of the Turtles on psychedelic drugs. The effervescent chorus is a fabulous singalong affair, making it instantly accessible."

== Usage in media ==
"My Friend Jack" was included in the documentary film John Peel's Record Box, made by Elaine Shepherd, released on 14 November 2005 on Channel 4 (British public-service television). The film was nominated for Primetime Emmy Award.

== Releases ==
- 7-inch Single (Metronome, 1967)
1. "My Friend Jack" - 3:06
2. "We Can Take It" - 2:47
- 7-inch EP (Impact, 1967)
1. "My Friend Jack" - 3:06
2. "Don't Lead Me On" - 2:19
3. "We Can Take It" - 2:46
4. "Waterfall" - 2:43

In 1976, The Smoke re-recorded the song with other arrangements and a glam rock style, along with the other songs from It's Smoke Time . The album was released under the British label Gull. The single (released only in France), featured a new song, "Lady".

- 12-inch LP (Gull, 1976)
1. "My Friend Jack" - 3:04
2. "Waterfall" - 2:37
3. "You Can't Catch Me" - 3:13
4. "High In A Room" - 2:56
5. "Wake Up Cherylina" - 2:15
6. "Don't Lead Me On" - 2:12
7. "We Can Take It" - 2:40
8. "If The Weather Is Sunny" - 2:50
9. "I Wanna Make It With You" - 3:04
10. "It's Getting Closer" - 2:37
11. "It's Just Your Way Of Loving" - 2:23
12. "I Would If I Could But I Can't" - 2:10

== Personnel ==
=== The Smoke ===
- Mick Rowley – Vocals, Guitar [With Two Fingers]
- Mal Luker - Guitar
- Zeke Lund –Bass
- Geoff Gill - Drums

== Chart performance ==
=== Weekly charts ===
Chart (1967)	Peak position
Austria (Disc Parade)	6
Belgium (Ultratop 50 Wallonia)	11
France (IFOP)	6
Switzerland (Schweizer Hitparade)	4
UK (Disc and Music Echo Top 50)	33
UK (Melody Maker Pop 50)	41
UK (Record Retailer Top 50)	45
West Germany (Musikmarkt)	2

=== Year-end charts ===
Chart (1967)	Peak position
West Germany (Musikmarkt)	36

== Boney M. version ==
"I See a Boat on the River / My Friend Jack"

Single by Boney M.

from the album The Magic of Boney M.
- Released: April 1980
- Recorded: 1980
- Genre: Pop, Euro disco
- Label: Hansa Records (FRG)
- Producer: Frank Farian

Boney M. singles chronology
"I'm Born Again / Bahama Mama" (1979)	""I See a Boat on the River" / "My Friend Jack"" (1980)	"Children of Paradise" / "Gadda-Da-Vida" (1980)

German/Caribbean vocal group Boney M. released "My Friend Jack" as a double A-side single (with "I See a Boat on the River") in 1980; the song was also included in the compilation album The Magic of Boney M. – 20 Golden Hits.

Original Smoke member Zeke Lund was by now working as a sound engineer for their album's record producer, Frank Farian. The initial single pressings featured a 4:56 single mix, differing with the omission of a guitar solo which was included in the subsequent 4:40 mix which was faded 10 seconds earlier on the LP version. This cover peaked at No. 6 in Norway and No. 57 in the U.K.

== Personnel ==
=== Boney M. ===
- Liz Mitchell - lead vocals
- Marcia Barrett - backing vocals
- Frank Farian - backing vocals
