= Belfast (Boney M. song) =

Single by Boney M.

from the album Love for Sale
- Released: 19 September 1977
- Recorded: March 1977
- Genre: Pop, funk, Europop, Euro disco
- Length: 3:30
- Label: Hansa (FRG); Atlantic (UK); Carrere (FR)
- Songwriters: James Robert Bilsbury, Drafi Franz Richard Deutscher, Joe Menke
- Producer: Frank Farian

Boney M. singles chronology
"Ma Baker" (1977)	"Belfast" (1977)	"Rivers of Babylon" (1978)

Music video
- "Belfast" (TopPop, 1977) on YouTube

"Belfast" is the second single of the Euro disco band Boney M.'s 1977 album Love for Sale. "Belfast" was the first Boney M. single to feature lead vocals by Marcia Barrett and became their 4th consecutive German chart-topper. In the UK Singles Chart it peaked at No. 8. It remained a popular track in the group's live shows over the years and was re-recorded by Barrett as a solo track on her album Come Into My Life (2005).

== Background and composition ==
"Belfast", written in 1971 by Drafi Deutscher and Jimmy Bilsbury, was originally entitled "Derry". The lyrics refer to the divided city during the height of The Troubles (1960s–1998) in Northern Ireland. Deutscher had written the song for Marcia Barrett when she was a solo artist in the early 1970s. Frank Farian also recorded a German version of "Belfast" with Austrian singer Gilla. Her version was included on the album Zieh mich aus, which was released in June 1976.

Due to a shortage of material when Boney M. performed their first live gigs in 1976, having only one album with eight songs, Barrett also performed "Belfast", which had been a popular live track for her. "Belfast" turned out to be as popular for Boney M. on stage as it had been for Barrett. The sound engineer of the group noticed the response at each gig where the song was performed. He told Farian about it, and Farian decided to record the track for the second Boney M. album, Love for Sale, in early 1977.

Due to the political context of the song, it was never released in the US and Canada. It was replaced on the album by "Daddy Cool".

== The track ==
The single was backed with "Plantation Boy" in all territories. In Germany, Belgium, the Netherlands, Luxembourg, France, the UK and Turkey, the singles featured the B-side fading 20 seconds earlier than the album version.

== Charts ==
=== Weekly charts ===
Weekly chart performance for "Belfast"
Chart (1977–1978)	Peak position
Australia (Kent Music Report)	57
Austria (Ö3 Austria Top 40)	2
Belgium (Ultratop 50 Flanders)	1
Belgium (Ultratop 50 Wallonia)	2
Finland (Suomen Virallinen)	15
France (IFOP)	1
Ireland (IRMA)	1
Italy (Musica e dischi)	20
Netherlands (Dutch Top 40)	3
Netherlands (Single Top 100)	3
Spain (AFE)	3
Switzerland (Schweizer Hitparade)	1
UK Singles (Official Charts)	8
West Germany (GfK)	1

=== Year-end charts ===
1977 year-end chart performance for "Belfast"
Chart (1977)	Position
Belgium (Ultratop 50 Flanders)	7
Netherlands (Single Top 100)	10

1978 year-end chart performance for "Belfast"
Chart (1978)	Position
Switzerland (Schweizer Hitparade)	27

== Sales ==
Sales for Belfast
Region	Sales
France	600,000
