= Brown Girl in the Ring (song) =

Traditional children's song from the West Indies

Single by Boney M.

from the album Nightflight to Venus
- A-side: "Rivers of Babylon"
- Released: 3 April 1978
- Recorded: 1978
- Genre: Reggae; calypso; disco; R&B
- Length: 4:02 (2nd single version / without steel drums); 4:02 (Album / 3rd single version); 4:20 (1st single version / long outro)
- Label: Hansa; Sire; Atlantic
- Songwriter: Frank Farian
- Producer: Frank Farian

Boney M. singles chronology
"Belfast" (1977)	"Brown Girl in the Ring" (1978)	"Rasputin" (1978)

Audio video
- "Brown Girl in the Ring" on YouTube

"Brown Girl in the Ring (Remix '93)"

Single by Boney M.

from the album Gold – 20 Super Hits
- Released: 1 April 1993
- Label: BMG (FRG)
- Songwriter: Franz Reuther (Frank Farian)
- Producer: Frank Farian

Boney M. singles chronology
"Megamix" (1992)	"Brown Girl in the Ring (Remix '93)" (1993)	"Ma Baker (Remix)" (1993)

"Brown Girl in the Ring" is a traditional children's song in the islands of the West Indies. It is originally said to have originated in Jamaica, as part of the children's game also known as "Brown Girl in the Ring". The song's lyrics instruct the game's performance: a girl enters the ring, formed by children holding hands, and performs a dance.

The song became internationally known when it was recorded by Euro-Caribbean vocal group Boney M. in 1978. Originally it was the B-side of their hit "Rivers of Babylon" but soon became a hit in its own right and was included on their third album, Nightflight to Venus (1978). The song had previously been recorded in 1975 by the group Malcolm's Locks, leading to a dispute over royalties. Bahamian musician Exuma also recorded a version of the song that appears on his 1972 album Reincarnation. The Boney M. version was remixed in 1993 by their founder and original producer Frank Farian.

== Origin ==
Children play ring games in many parts of the world, especially during their pre-teen years. In There's a Brown Girl in the Ring, an anthology of Eastern Caribbean song games by Alan Lomax, J.D. Elder and Bess Lomax Hawes, it is suggested that ring games are a children's precursor to adult courtship.

== Boney M. recording (1978) ==
Arguably the most popular version of the song, Boney M.'s recording was originally the B-side to the group's number-one hit single "Rivers of Babylon" (1978). In July 1978, following ten weeks in the UK Top Ten, five of them at number one, "Rivers of Babylon" slipped to number 18 and then to 20, when radio stations flipped the single. Airplay for "Brown Girl in the Ring" resulted in a happy chart reversal, with the single re-entering the Top Ten, where it spent an additional nine weeks, peaking at number two in September. Liz Mitchell had previously recorded the song in 1975 with the group Malcolm's Locks, as the B-side of their single "Caribbean Rock". Mitchell's ex-boyfriend Malcolm Magaron was the group's lead singer. Arranger Peter Herbolzheimer accused Frank Farian of stealing his arrangement for the song, for which Farian claimed credit on the single. The court case ran for more than 20 years in Germany.

The early single version (1st pressing) released on the Diamond CD box-set in 2015 includes the full-length 4:18 version. The single mix is also slightly different from the album version: the latter makes use of steel drums on the outro riff of the song whereas the single mix does not. The four-minute single hit version (2nd pressing) has yet to appear on CD (as of July 2018). The "Rivers of Babylon"/"Brown Girl in the Ring" single is the sixth best-selling single of all time in the UK with sales of 2 million.

=== 1993 remix ===
Following the successful sales of the compilation album Gold – 20 Super Hits, Frank Farian remixed "Brown Girl in the Ring" for a single release in April 1993 with new lead vocals by Liz Mitchell. The single reached number seven in Denmark and 38 in the UK, while failing to chart in Germany. The single also included a new remix of "The Calendar Song", originally included on Boney M.'s album Oceans of Fantasy (1979). A "rap version" with vocals from Marlon B was the B-side to most versions of the 1993 remix single.

12" single

- "Brown Girl in the Ring (Remix '93)" (MCI/BMG 74321 13705 1, 1993)

Side A

1. "Brown Girl in the Ring" (Funny Girl Club Mix) – 5:45
2. "The Calendar Song (January, February, March...)" (Remix '93) – 3:24

Side B

1. "Brown Girl in the Ring" (Club Mix – Rap Version) – 5:45
2. "Brown Girl in the Ring" (Radio Version) – 3:58

CD

- "Brown Girl in the Ring (Remix '93)" (MCI/BMG 74321 13705 2, 1993)
1. "Brown Girl in the Ring" (Radio Version) – 3:58
2. "Brown Girl in the Ring" (Funny Girl Club Mix) – 5:45
3. "Brown Girl in the Ring" (Club Mix – Rap Version) – 5:45
4. "The Calendar Song (January, February, March...)" (Remix '93) – 3:24

== Recordings by other artists ==
- Lord Invader, a calypsonian from Trinidad, recorded a version circa 1946–1947 in New York. The recording is now part of the Smithsonian Folkways collection and was only released in 2000 on Lord Invader Calypso in New York CD.
- Lord Invader also recorded a new version of the song in the late 1950s, released on the There's a Brown Boy in the Ring and Other Children's Calypso Songs (1959).
- Boney M.'s version was covered in the 1990s by the Australian children's artist The Wiggles, by the German pop group Liquido, and in 1987 by Canadian singer Raffi.

== Charts ==
=== 1978 Boney M. version ===
Chart (1978)	Peak position
Canada Top Singles (RPM)	79
Canada Adult Contemporary (RPM)	8
Europe (Eurochart Hot 100)	1

=== 1993 remix ===
Chart (1993)	Peak position
Belgium (Ultratop 50 Flanders)	46
Denmark (IFPI)	7
Europe (Eurochart Hot 100)	79
Ireland (IRMA)	25
New Zealand (Recorded Music NZ)	20
UK Singles (OCC)	38

== Certifications ==
Region	Certification	Certified units/sales
New Zealand (RMNZ)	Gold	15,000^{‡}
^{‡} Sales+streaming figures based on certification alone.

== See also ==
- Hokey Pokey
- Musical chairs

== Bibliography ==
- There's a Brown Girl in the Ring – Alan Lomax, J.D. Elder and Bess Lomax Hawes, Random House, New York, 1997 (Cloth, ISBN 0-679-40453-8)
