= El Lute/Gotta Go Home =

"Gotta Go Home"

Single by Boney M.

from the album Oceans of Fantasy
- B-side: "El Lute"
- Released: 1979
- Label: Hansa (FRG)
- Composers: Heinz Huth, Jürgen Huth, Frank Farian
- Lyricist: Fred Jay
- Producer: Frank Farian

Boney M. singles chronology
| "Hooray! Hooray! It's a Holi-Holiday" (1979) | "El Lute" / "Gotta Go Home" (1979) | "I'm Born Again / Bahama Mama" (1979) |

Audio video
- "Gotta Go Home" on YouTube

"Gotta Go Home" is a 1979 double A-side single by German group Boney M. It was the lead single from their fourth album Oceans of Fantasy (1979) and was the group's eighth and final number-one single in the German charts.

In the UK, where "Gotta Go Home" was chosen as the main A-side, the single was their first one since their debut single not to reach the Top 10, peaking at number 12. Boney M. used the double A-side format over the next years, typically with the A1 being the song intended for radio and the A2 being more squarely aimed at discos. The sides were usually switched on the accompanying 12" single.

== "El Lute" ==
"El Lute" tells the true story of Spanish outlaw Eleuterio Sánchez, who was still in prison at the time the song was released, though he was shortly to be released following a pardon. The song presents his claim that he was wrongly convicted of murder and links his liberation from prison to the liberation of his country from oppression after the rule of Franco. During a promotional visit in Spain, Boney M. met Sánchez and gave him a golden record for the sales of the single.

Margot Borgström wrote lyrics in Swedish, as Wizex recorded the song on the 1979 album Some Girls & Trouble Boys. Released under Kikki Danielsson's name, the song became a Svensktoppen hit for 10 weeks between 25 November 1979 – 10 February 1980, even topping the chart for one week. Liz Mitchell later released a version on the album No One Will Force You titled "Mandela" with the lyrics altered to describe the life of Nelson Mandela, who was still in prison at the time.

== "Gotta Go Home" ==
"Gotta Go Home" was re-written from a German single "Hallo Bimmelbahn" (1973) by Nighttrain with the brothers Heinz and Jürgen Huth, both also credited as co-writers on Boney M.'s version. Boney M. first promoted it in a few TV shows in its early version "Going Back Home". Several single versions featured a 4:40 version (timing on label 4:22), a slightly remixed edit of the full 5:04 version, and longer than the 3:45 album edit. Later single pressings featured a 4:00 edit, which is the same as the album edit but with the "going back home.." break slightly extended.

"Gotta Go Home" was issued as an A-side in Canada, and was a Top 40 hit on the RPM Magazine charts there, peaking at number 35 in November 1979.

== Releases ==
=== 7" single ===
- "El Lute" (Frank Farian, Hans Blum, Fred Jay) – 5:10 / "Gotta Go Home" (12" version edit) (Farian, Huth, Huth, Jay) – 4:35 (Hansa 100 804-100, Germany)
- "El Lute" (Frank Farian, Hans Blum, Fred Jay) – 5:10 / "Gotta Go Home" (extended LP mix) (Farian, Huth, Huth, Jay) – 4:00 (Hansa 100 804-100, Germany)
- "Gotta Go Home" – 4:00 / "El Lute" – 5:10 (Atlantic K 11351, UK)
- "Gotta Go Home" – 4:00 / "El Lute" – 5:10 (Atlantic P-481, Japan)

=== 12" single ===
- "Gotta Go Home" – 5:04 / "El Lute" – 5:09 (Hansa 600 081-213, Germany)
- "Gotta Go Home" – 5:04 / "El Lute" – 5:09 (Hansa 600 081-213, Germany) – clear vinyl

== Charts ==
=== Weekly charts ===
| Chart (1979–1980) | Peak position |
|---|---|
| Argentina | 4 |
| Australia (Kent Music Report) | 44 |
| Belgium (Ultratop 50 Flanders) | 2 |
| Canada Top Singles (RPM) | 35 |
| Europe (Eurochart Hot 100) | 1 |
| Finland (Suomen Virallinen) | 2 |
| France (IFOP) | 5 |
| Ireland (IRMA) | 11 |
| Netherlands (Dutch Top 40) | 2 |
| Netherlands (Single Top 100) | 2 |
| New Zealand (Recorded Music NZ) | 42 |
| Norway (VG-lista) | 4 |
| Portugal (Música & Som) | 2 |
| South Africa (Springbok Radio) | 2 |
| Spain (AFE) | 5 |
| UK Singles (Official Charts) | 12 |
| West Germany (GfK) | 1 |

=== Year-end charts ===
| Chart (1979) | Rank |
|---|---|
| Austria (Ö3 Austria Top 40) | 5 |
| Belgium (Ultratop 50 Flanders) | 16 |
| France (IFOP) | 16 |
| Netherlands (Dutch Top 40) | 15 |
| Netherlands (Single Top 100) | 27 |
| Switzerland (Schweizer Hitparade) | 8 |
| West Germany (Official German Charts) | 14 |

== Certifications ==
| Region | Certification | Certified units/sales |
|---|---|---|
| Germany (BVMI) | Gold | 500,000^{^} |
| Netherlands (NVPI) | Gold | 100,000^{^} |
| United Kingdom (BPI) | Silver | 250,000^{^} |
^{^} Shipments figures based on certification alone.

== Covers ==
In 2010, "Gotta Go Home" was sampled on the Duck Sauce dance hit "Barbra Streisand".

The song was sampled by Vietnamese rapper named Antoneus Maximus (Long Mộng Gà) and Phương Vy - female singer for their 2014 single "On and On".

In 2014, the song was sampled for a Mercedes-Benz commercial featuring Mario that aired in Japan.

On 8 November 2023, Finnish folk metal band Korpiklaani released a cover of "Gotta Go Home".

== See also ==
- List of European number-one hits of 1979
