= The Smoke =

English pop group

- L to R: Rowley, Gill, Lund, Luker

Background information
- Also known as: The Shots
- Origin: York, England
- Genres: Psychedelic rock; freakbeat; psychedelic pop
- Years active: 1965–1976
- Labels: Columbia; Metronome
- Past members: Mick Rowley (vocals); Mal Luker (guitar); John "Zeke" Lund (bass); Geoff Gill (drums)

The Smoke were an English psychedelic pop and freakbeat group from York.

The band originally performed around Yorkshire as The Moonshots, changing their name to The Shots when they moved to London. There were two bands playing R&B and other cover versions, one called Tony Adams and the Viceroys, which included John 'Zeke' Lund on bass, Mal Luker on lead guitar and Geoff Gill on drums. The other band was The Moonshots, which included Mick Rowley on lead vocals and Phil Peacock on rhythm guitar (born Philip Peacock, 7 June 1946, Newcastle, Northumbria). These bands then came together to form The Shots and made a single for Columbia, "Keep A Hold Of What You've Got", which flopped. Peacock left the band, and they then changed their name to The Smoke.

The Smoke's biggest hit was "My Friend Jack" (German Chart: No. 2, UK Singles Chart: No. 45); the BBC banned airplay of the song over its then alleged, though highly apparent, drug references. Later singles released under the band name often had variations on the remaining trio of Lund, Luker and Gill, performing along with session musicians to pad out the sound. All failed to sell in any numbers.

Guitarist Lund later became a sound engineer for Boney M., who recorded a cover version of "My Friend Jack".

The Smoke's demo recording of Nirvana's "Girl in the Park" opens Secret Theatre, a 1995 Nirvana rarities album.

== Discography ==
=== Albums ===
- 1967: It's Smoke Time (Metronome, Germany-only)

=== Singles ===
as The Shots

- 1965: "Keep A Hold Of What You've Got" / "She's A Liar" (UK)
- 1965: "There She Goes" / "Walk Right Out The Door" (UK)

as The Smoke

- 1967: "My Friend Jack" / "We Can Take It" (D)
- 1967: "High In A Room" / "If The Weather's Sunny" (D)
- 1967: "If The Weather's Sunny" / "I Would If I Could, But I Can't" (UK)
- 1967: "Victor Henry's Cool Book" / "Have Some More Tea" (D)
- 1967: "It Could Be Wonderful" / "Have Some More Tea" (UK)
- 1968: "Utterly Simple" / "Sydney Gill" (UK)
- 1968: "Sydney Gill" / "It Could Be Wonderful" (D)
- 1971: "Ride, Ride, Ride" / "Guy Fawkes" (UK)
- 1972: "Sugar Man" / "That's What I Want" (D)
- 1972: "Jack is Back" / "That's What I Want" (F)
- 1974: "Shagalagalu" / "Gimme Good Loving" (D)
- 1974: "My Lullaby" / "Looking High" (UK)
- 1976: "My Friend Jack" (1976 version) / "Lady" (F)

=== Compilations ===
- 2015: My Friend Jack Eats Sugar Lumps: An Anthology (Morgan Blue Town, UK)
