= Oceans of Fantasy =

Studio album by Boney M.
- Released: September 21, 1979
- Recorded: February 1979 – August 1979
- Genres: Eurodisco; reggae
- Length: 54:17 (LP); 51:49 (CD)
- Labels: Atlantic; Sire; Hansa
- Producer: Frank Farian

Boney M. chronology
Nightflight to Venus (1978)	Oceans of Fantasy (1979)	The Magic of Boney M. – 20 Golden Hits (1980)

Singles from Oceans of Fantasy
- 1. "Hold On, I'm Coming" Released: June 1979; 2. "El Lute / Gotta Go Home" Released: August 1979; 3. "I'm Born Again / Bahama Mama" Released: November 1979

Professional ratings
Review scores
Source	Rating
Allmusic	2.5/5 stars
Smash Hits	unfavourable

Oceans of Fantasy is the fourth studio album by Euro-Caribbean group Boney M. Released in September 1979, Oceans of Fantasy became the second Boney M. album to top the UK charts and features the hits "El Lute / Gotta Go Home" and "I'm Born Again / Bahama Mama".

== Background ==
The album had been preceded in the spring of 1979 by the single "Hooray! Hooray! It's a Holi-Holiday" (based on the American folksong "Polly Wolly Doodle"), one of the band's biggest hits. This was not included on Oceans of Fantasy but the B-side, "Ribbons of Blue" was, albeit in a heavily edited form. The original length of the track is 4:02, and songs like "Gotta Go Home" and "Bahama Mama" were also longer on 7" than on the actual album.

As with the group's previous album, Nightflight to Venus, the original Hansa Records pressings of the album also included a range of different edits of certain tracks.

The 1994 CD version used same master with East German version of the album. (Same with fourth pressing, but "Ribbons of Blue" is longer like the other pressings, 2:01 min.) unlike the common West German pressings with different edits of certain songs. On 2007 reissue, two bonus tracks added to the album.

Several pressings also contained the wrong running order on cover and labels, incorrectly listing "El Lute" as the opening track on side two, followed by "No More Chain Gang" and "Oceans of Fantasy" like only the first pressing.

The first pressing also features "Let It All Be Music" and "Gotta Go Home" segued together. So the later pressings feature the songs separately.

Oceans of Fantasy also features a guest appearance by Eruption's lead singer Precious Wilson on "Let It All Be Music" and the cover of Sam & Dave's "Hold On I'm Coming", which was also issued as Wilson's first solo single. The Argentinian pressing omitted "El Lute" in favour of "Hooray! Hooray! It's a Holi-Holiday".

The album was the only Boney M. album to feature a full track-by-track vocal credits list which confirmed that only two of the four band members, Liz Mitchell and Marcia Barrett, actually sang on the Boney M. records, and that producer Frank Farian sang the characteristic deep male vocal as well as high falsetto vocals (he even duetted with himself on the track "Bye Bye Bluebird"). Maizie Williams and Bobby Farrell did not take any part in the studio sessions, though performed vocals at Boney M.'s live concerts.

"No More Chain Gang" was covered by Turkish singer Tarkan as "Çok Ararsın Beni" ("You Call Me Too Much") on his debut album "Yine Sensiz" ("Without You Again") in 1992.

== Track listing ==
Side A:

1. "Let It All Be Music" (W. S. van Vugt) - 4:46
2. "Gotta Go Home" (music: Frank Farian, Heinz Huth, Jürgen Huth; lyrics: Fred Jay) - 3:46
3. "Bye Bye Bluebird" (Frank Farian, Fred Jay, George Reyam) - 4:42
4. "Bahama Mama" (Frank Farian, Fred Jay) - 3:17
5. "Hold On I'm Coming" (Isaac Hayes, David Porter) - 4:05
6. "Two of Us" (Lennon–McCartney) - 3:29
7. "Ribbons of Blue" (Keith Forsey, L. Andrew) - 2:01

Side B:

1. "Oceans of Fantasy" (Dietmar Kawohl, Didi Zill, Fred Jay) - 5:26
2. "El Lute" (Frank Farian, Fred Jay, Hans Blum) - 5:09
3. "No More Chain Gang" (Rainer Ehrhardt, Frank Farian, Fred Jay) - 5:12
4. "I'm Born Again" (Traditional, Helmut Rulofs, Fred Jay) - 4:08
5. "No Time to Lose" (Frank Farian, Fred Jay, Stefan Klinkhammer) - 3:26
6. "Calendar Song (January, February, March...)" (Traditional, Frank Farian) - 2:44

== Personnel ==
- Liz Mitchell - lead vocals (A1, A6, A7, B2, B4 & B6), backing vocals (A1, A2, A4, A7, B2, B3 & B6)
- Marcia Barrett - lead vocals (A1 & B5), backing vocals (A1, A2, A4, A6, A7, B2, B3, B5 & B6)
- Frank Farian - lead vocals (A1, B2, B3), lead and backing vocals (A3 & B1) backing vocals (A1, A2, A4, A5, A6, A7, B3, B4, B5 & B6)
- Precious Wilson - guest lead vocals on track A1, lead and backing vocals on A5
- Linda Blake - voice of "Bahama Mama" on A4
- Bill Swisher - narrator on B2
- Gary Unwin - bass guitar
- Reinhard Besser - bass guitar
- Keith Forsey - drums
- Mats Björklund - guitar
- Nick Woodland - guitar
- Michael Cretu - keyboards
- Lisa Gordanier - alto saxophone
- American Horns in Europe - brass instruments
- Lance Burton - baritone saxophone
- Bobby Stern - tenor saxophone
- Geoff Stradling - trombone
- Jim Polivka - trumpet
- Scot Newton - trumpet
- Etienne Cap - trumpet on "Oceans of Fantasy"
- Walter Raab - trumpet on "Oceans of Fantasy"
- Karl Bartelmes - trumpet on "Oceans of Fantasy"
- Benny Gebauer - saxophone on "Oceans of Fantasy"
- Dino Solera - saxophone on "Oceans of Fantasy", pan flute on "El Lute"
- George Delagaye - trombone on "Oceans of Fantasy"
- Ludwig Rehberg Jr. - sound effects on "Oceans of Fantasy"
- The Original Trinidad Steel and Showband - performers

== Production ==
- Frank Farian - producer
- Rainer M. Ehrhardt - production assistant
- Christian Kolonovits - arranger
- Keith Forsey - arranger
- Michael Cretu - arranger
- Stefan Klinkhammer - arranger
- Fred Schreier - sound engineer
- Michael Bestmann - sound engineer
- Tammy Grohé - sound engineer
- Manfred Vormstein - art direction & design
- Jürgen F. Rogner - illustration
- Didi Zill - photography
- Recorded and mixed at Europasound Studios, Friedrichsdorf and Union Studio, Munich.

== Charts ==
=== Weekly charts ===
Chart (1979–80)	Peak position
Argentinian Albums	9
Australian Albums (Kent Music Report)	21
Austrian Albums (Ö3 Austria)	1
Canada Top Albums/CDs (RPM)	44
Finnish Albums (Suomen virallinen lista)	1
Dutch Albums (Album Top 100)	3
German Albums (Offizielle Top 100)	1
New Zealand Albums (RMNZ)	5
Norwegian Albums (VG-lista)	1
Swedish Albums (Sverigetopplistan)	5
UK Albums (Official Charts)	1

=== Year-end charts ===
Chart (1979)	Position
Austrian Albums (Ö3 Austria)	10
Dutch Albums (Album Top 100)	86
Chart (1980)	Position
German Albums (Offizielle Top 100)	29

== Certifications and sales ==
Region	Certification	Certified units/sales
Canada	—	100,000
Finland (Musiikkituottajat)	Gold	26,117
France	—	250,000
Germany (BVMI)	Platinum	500,000^{^}
Hong Kong (IFPI Hong Kong)	Platinum	20,000^{*}
Netherlands (NVPI)	Platinum	100,000^{^}
Spain (Promusicae)	Platinum	100,000^{^}
United Kingdom (BPI)	Platinum	300,000^{^}
^{*} Sales figures based on certification alone.^{^} Shipments figures based on certification alone.

== Reissued ==
- 1994: CD, BMG 74321 21268 2
- 2007: CD, Sony BMG Music Entertainment 88697082632
- 2011: Boney M. Original Album Classics, 5 × CD box set, Sony Music 88697928702
- 2017: Boney M. Complete, 9 × LP box set, Sony Music 88985406971
