= Rasputin (song) =

1978 single by Boney M.

Single by Boney M.

from the album Nightflight to Venus
- B-side: "Never Change Lovers in the Middle of the Night" (Europe, Australia, Mexico, Japan, Colombia, Canada, New Zealand) "Heart of Gold" (Brazil) "Nightflight to Venus" (Poland, Chile) "Painter Man" (Europe, Turkey, Yugoslavia, Madagascar, Bolivia, India) "He Was a Steppenwolf" (Rhodesia, U.S., South Africa)
- Released: 28 August 1978
- Recorded: May 1978
- Genre: Eurodisco
- Length: 5:51 (album version); 4:44 (original single version); 4:26 (video version/1992 edit); 3:41 (radio edit)
- Label: Hansa; Sire; Atlantic
- Songwriters: Frank Farian; George Reyam; Fred Jay
- Producer: Farian

Boney M. singles chronology
"Rivers of Babylon" / "Brown Girl in the Ring" (1978)	"Rasputin" (1978)	"Mary's Boy Child – Oh My Lord" (1978)

Audio video
- "Rasputin" on YouTube

"Rasputin" is a song by German-based pop and Eurodisco group Boney M. It was released on 28 August 1978 as the second single from their third studio album Nightflight to Venus (1978). Written by the group's creator Frank Farian, along with George Reyam and Fred Jay, it is a song about Grigori Rasputin, a friend and advisor of Emperor Nicholas II and his family during the early 20th century. The song describes Rasputin as a playboy, mystical healer, and political manipulator. It is the band's signature song.

== Composition ==
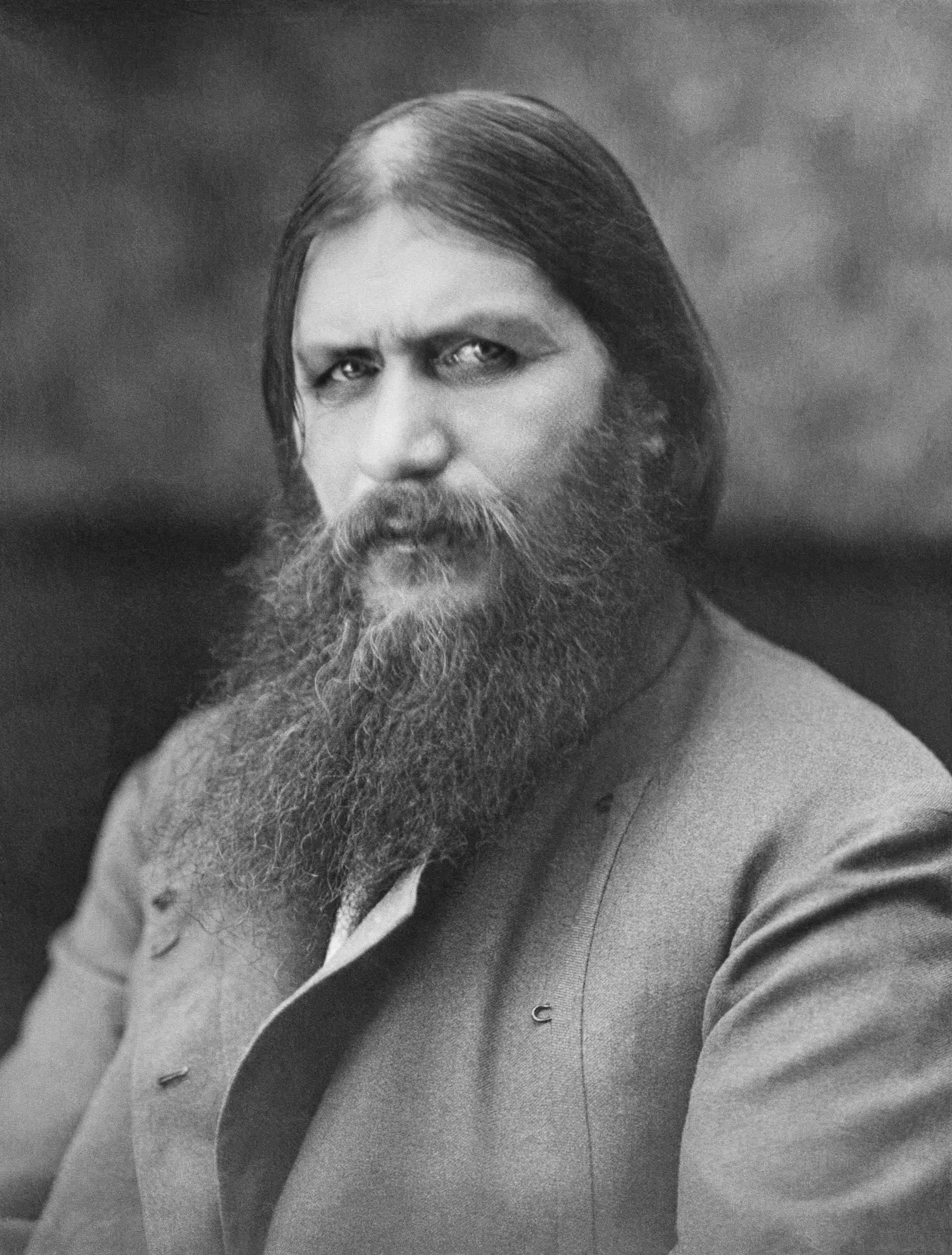
Grigori Rasputin, the subject of the song

The core about the song tells of Rasputin's rise to prominence in the court of Nicholas II, referencing the hope held by Empress Alexandra Fyodorovna that Grigori Rasputin would heal her hemophiliac son, Tsarevich Alexei of Russia, and as such his appointment as Alexei's personal healer. Rasputin gained tremendous influence from this position, particularly with Alexandra. This is also retold in the song: "For the queen he was no wheeler dealer". It also claims that Rasputin was Alexandra's paramour: "Ra Ra Rasputin, lover of the Russian queen, there was a cat that really was gone". This was a widespread rumour in Rasputin's time, with which his political enemies intended to discredit him. It stemmed from Rasputin's closeness to the Empress. "Rasputin" starts to retell contemporary accounts of his powerful personality: "He was big and strong, in his eyes a flaming glow..." "He could preach the bible like a preacher, full of ecstasy and fire..." The song depicts Rasputin as being extremely popular with the Russian elite, something that is historically supported: "to Moscow chicks he was such a lovely dear". The song also depicts Rasputin as being sexually promiscuous, another contemporary rumour: "But he was real great when he had a girl to squeeze." "...though she'd heard the things he'd done..." "Russia's greatest love machine". The song claims that Rasputin's political power overshadowed that of the Tsar himself in "all affairs of state", which was one of the main arguments of his contemporary rivals. The bridge of the song states that when his purported sexual escapades and political acts became intolerable, "men of higher standing" plotted his downfall, although "the ladies begged" them not to. Although the song states "he was a brute", it claims that the ladies "just fell into his arms."

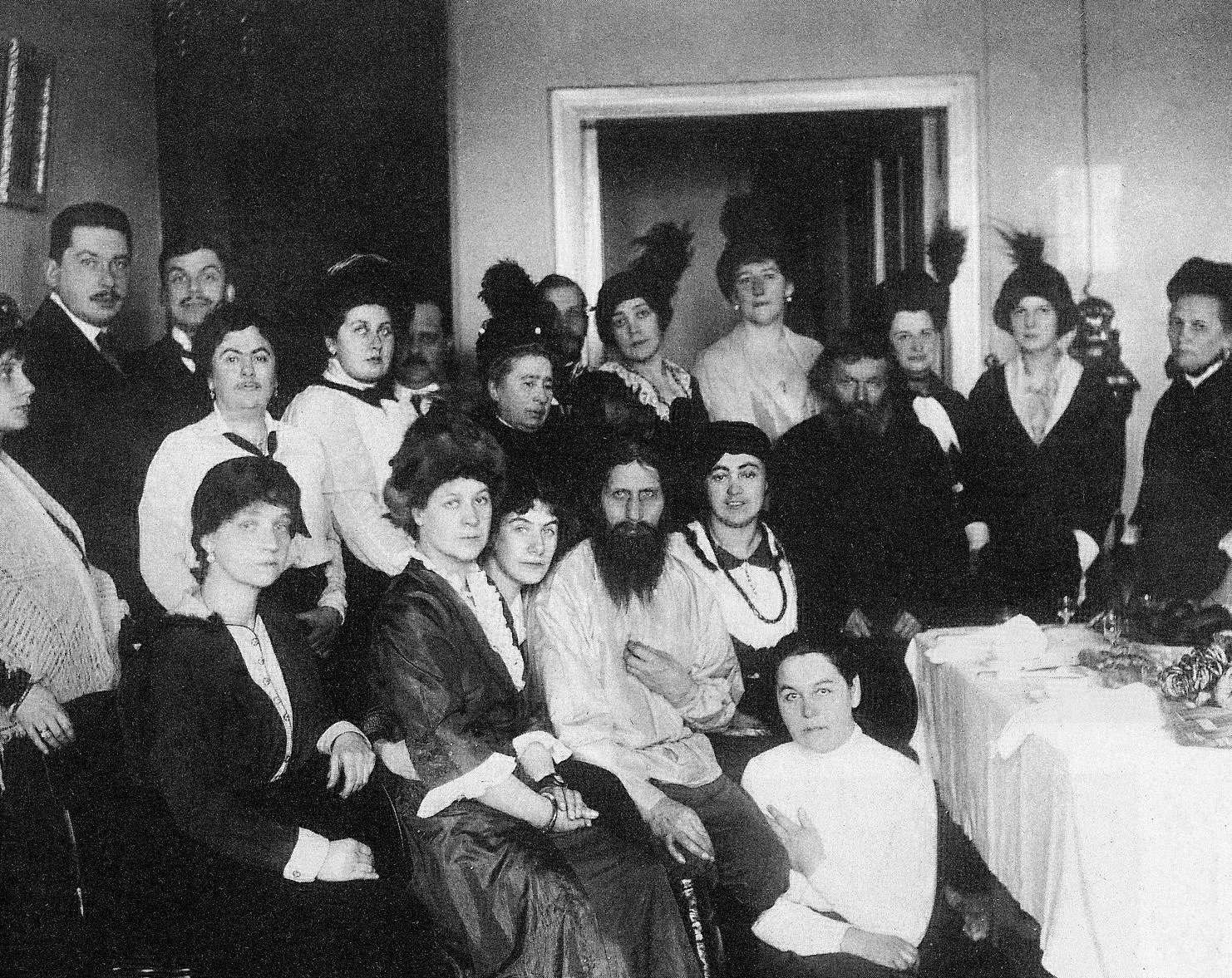
Rasputin among admirers, 1914

The end of the song recounts a modified version of a popular description of the events that culminated in Rasputin's assassination, as perpetrated by Felix Yusupov, Vladimir Purishkevich, and Dmitri Pavlovich, on 16 December 1916 (O.S.). The song accurately states that the conspirators asked him "Come to visit us", and then recounts a widely popular account of the assassination in Yusupov's estate: that Rasputin's assassins fatally shot him after he survived the poisoning of his wine.

Historian Simon Sebag Montefiore has described the song as "an excellent introduction to Russian court politics in the early 20th century." While the song accurately re-tells many of the unfavorable contemporary rumours that damaged Rasputin's reputation and led to his assassination, there is no verifiable evidence to suggest that he had an affair with Alexandra.

Frank Farian's American friend Bill Swisher, who was a soldier in Germany at the time, provides spoken vocals at the bridge in the form of a newsreader. Swisher also guested on Boney M. singles such as "Ma Baker" and "El Lute".

=== Melody ===
AllMusic's journalist Donald A. Guarisco described it as "a tribute to the legendary Russian historical figure that uses balalaikas to create its textured rhythm guitar hook." Its melody caused a debate in the 1970s due to its similarity to the traditional Turkish song "Kâtibim", but the band denied there was any borrowing. However, during an episode of the BBC podcast "Soul Music", Boney M lead singer Liz Mitchell stated "I've heard that it was an old Turkish folk song that was owned by a Tunisian. So we bought it from a Tunisian."

== Reception and legacy ==
The song rose to the top of the charts in Germany and Austria and went to No. 2 in the United Kingdom and Switzerland. It was also another No. 1 hit for Boney M. in Australia, giving them their second (and last) chart-topper in that country (the other one being "Rivers of Babylon").

AllMusic's Donald A. Guarisco called the track "the oddest and most unusual and interesting combination of musical elements" from Nightflight to Venus, then picked it as one of his "track picks" from the album.

Although the song was written and performed in English, with single German and Russian words – "But the kasatschok he danced really wunderbar!" – it enjoyed great popularity in the Soviet Union, and is credited with reviving the fame of Rasputin there. During their visit to Poland in 1979, the band performed the song despite being asked not to by government officials. The show in Sopot was broadcast on national TV the next day after the song was edited out of their performance, but it was broadcast on the radio live and in full.

The song has been covered by several other bands in varying musical styles. The British comic book Nikolai Dante cited a lyric from the song for the title of its story called "Russia's Greatest Love Machine" in the 1997 issue of 2000 AD. The Washington, D.C.–based dance/rock band Ra Ra Rasputin takes its name from the song. A Spanish version by Fangoria was included on their compilation album Dilemas, amores y dramas (2003).

The song was featured extensively in a trailer for 2021's The King's Man entitled "Official Rasputin Dance Video." The video focused heavily on the character Rasputin, who is portrayed in the movie by Welsh actor Rhys Ifans. The song does not appear in the final movie.

The song was briefly referenced in the Doctor Who episode, entitled "The Power of the Doctor", where the Master manages to adopt the identity of Rasputin and takes control of the Russian Imperial Court, and after ordering the Russian Imperial Family out of the Winter Palace, he brings in several Daleks and Cybermen, before trapping the Doctor in a device disguised as a chandelier, which then begins to play the song, which he then dances to.

The song was featured in the 5th episode of the 6th season of Black Mirror, entitled "Demon 79", and the 2026 Hindi film, Dhurandhar: The Revenge.

== Versions ==
The album pressings of Nightflight to Venus feature the title track segued into "Rasputin". Initial LP pressings included the full-length, 6:26 version of "Rasputin", most notable for an instrumental interlude in the third verse between the lines "though he was a brute, they just fell into his arms" and "Then one night some men of higher standing ..." that was later cut out. The second LP pressing featured a 6:03 version, subsequent pressings a 5:51 version. Boney M.'s single edit is completely different from the edit (same with the instrumental version released in 2021) used for Frank Farian's Gilla recording in German that followed in November 1978 (without success).

== Release ==
The German and Benelux pressings were backed with "Painter Man"; for most other territories the B-side chosen was "Never Change Lovers in the Middle of the Night". The UK pressings had a 5:32 version; most countries faded it to 5:02, while the French Carrere Records release had a 4:45 version. In the United Kingdom, "Painter Man" was issued as an A-side single in February 1979, giving the group a No. 10 hit. In Canada, "Rasputin" was the A-side and became a major hit, topping the Canadian RPM magazine's Adult Contemporary singles chart for two weeks beginning 24 March 1979, and peaking at No. 7 on RPM's Top 100 pop singles chart that same week. Despite the Canadian success, the song failed to chart in the United States.

In late January 2021, over 40 years since it was released as a single, the song went viral on TikTok, also appearing on Spotify's "Viral Hits" playlist. The accompanying dance originated from the 2010 video game, Just Dance 2.

== Charts ==
=== Weekly charts ===
Chart (1978–1979)	Peak position
Argentina (CAPIF)	2
Australia (Kent Music Report)	1
Austria (Ö3 Austria Top 40)	1
Belgium (Ultratop 50 Flanders)	1
Canada Top Singles (RPM)	7
Finland (Suomen Virallinen)	2
France (SNEP)	31
Germany (GfK)	1
Ireland (IRMA)	3
Italy (Musica e dischi)	8
Netherlands (Dutch Top 40)	8
Netherlands (Single Top 100)	5
New Zealand (Recorded Music NZ)	4
Norway (VG-lista)	10
Portugal (AFP)	3
South Africa (Springbok Radio)	9
Spain (AFE)	2
Switzerland (Schweizer Hitparade)	2
UK Singles (Official Charts)	2
Zimbabwe (ZIMA)	6

Chart (2021–2022)	Peak position
France (SNEP)	31
Hungary (Single Top 40)	32
Sweden Heatseeker (Sverigetopplistan)	17
US Hot Dance/Electronic Songs (Billboard)	10

=== Year-end charts ===
Chart (1978)	Position
Australia (Kent Music Report)	25
Austria (Ö3 Austria Top 40)	17
Belgium (Ultratop Flanders)	11
Germany (Official German Charts)	50
Netherlands (Dutch Top 40)	58
Netherlands (Single Top 100)	53
Portugal (AFP)	3
Switzerland (Schweizer Hitparade)	17

Chart (1979)	Position
Canada Top Singles (RPM)	53

Chart (2021)	Position
France (SNEP)	67

== Sales and certifications ==
Region	Certification	Certified units/sales
Australia (ARIA)	Platinum	70,000^{‡}
Canada (Music Canada)	Platinum	150,000^{^}
France	—	500,000
Germany Maxi single	—	40,000
Germany (BVMI)	Gold	300,000^{‡}
Italy (FIMI)	Gold	50,000^{‡}
Netherlands (NVPI)	Gold	100,000^{^}
New Zealand (RMNZ)	3× Platinum	90,000^{‡}
Spain (Promusicae)	Gold	30,000^{‡}
United Kingdom (BPI)	Platinum	600,000^{‡}
^{^} Shipments figures based on certification alone.^{‡} Sales+streaming figures based on certification alone.

== Turisas version ==
"Rasputin"

Single by Turisas

from the album The Varangian Way
- Released: 21 September 2007
- Recorded: 2007
- Studio: Sound Supreme Studio, Hämeenlinna
- Genre: Folk metal; symphonic metal
- Length: 3:54
- Label: Century
- Songwriters: Frank Farian; George Reyam; Fred Jay
- Producers: Mathias "Warlord" Nygård, Janne Saska

Turisas singles chronology
"To Holmgard and Beyond" (2007)	"Rasputin" (2007)	"Supernaut" (2010)

Music video
- TURISAS – Rasputin (OFFICIAL VIDEO) on YouTube

Finnish folk metal band Turisas recorded a cover of Rasputin, released on 21 September 2007 through Century Media. The band played the cover live for a few years and finally decided to record a studio version of it because of positive feedback from fans. A music video was shot as well.

=== Track listing ===
1. "Rasputin" – 3:56
2. "Battle Metal" – 4:23

A limited edition 7" picture vinyl features "The Court of Jarisleif" as the B-side.

Different regions contained different B-sides. Canadian, South American, Asian and some European releases featured "Never Change Lovers in the Middle of the Night," the US release featured "He Was a Steppenwolf." The Polish and Chilean releases featured "Night Flight to Venus" and remaining European releases featured "Painter Man" as the B-side.

iTunes edition:

1. "Rasputin" – 3:53
2. "Rasputin" (Heavy Demo Version) – 3:53
3. "Rasputin" (Instrumental) – 3:51

=== Personnel ===
- Mathias Nygård – vocals, orchestral programming and keyboards
- Jussi Wickström – guitar
- Tude Lehtonen – drums and percussion
- Olli Vänskä – violin
- Hannes Horma – bass
- Lisko – accordion

== Majestic version ==
"Rasputin"

Single by Majestic and Boney M.

from the album The Magic of Boney M. (Special Remix Edition)
- Released: 26 February 2021
- Recorded: 2021
- Genre: House; nu-disco
- Length: 3:06
- Label: Nitron; Sony
- Songwriters: Frank Farian; George Reyam; Fred Jay
- Producer: Majestic

Majestic singles chronology
"Me & U" (2020)	"Rasputin" (2021)	"Losing My Mind" (2021)

Audio video
- "Rasputin" on YouTube

On 26 February 2021, following the resurgence of the song on TikTok, North London DJ and producer Majestic released a revamped remix of the song credited to Majestic x Boney M. It has charted on the UK Singles Chart, the US Billboard Hot Dance and Electronic Songs chart and across Europe. This version only contains lyrics from the first verse and first chorus of the original track.

=== Weekly charts ===
Chart (2021)	Peak position
Australia (ARIA)	26
Austria (Ö3 Austria Top 40)	18
Belgium (Ultratop 50 Flanders)	2
Belgium (Ultratop 50 Wallonia)	20
Canada Hot 100 (Billboard)	72
CIS Airplay (TopHit)	56
Czech Republic Singles Digital (ČNS IFPI)	30
Finland (Suomen virallinen lista)	10
Germany (GfK)	38
Global 200 (Billboard)	72
Hungary (Dance Top 40)	8
Hungary (Single Top 40)	6
Hungary (Stream Top 40)	35
Ireland (IRMA)	21
Italy (FIMI)	51
Lithuania (AGATA)	31
Netherlands (Dutch Top 40)	5
Netherlands (Single Top 100)	7
Norway (VG-lista)	17
Poland Airplay (ZPAV)	1
Portugal (AFP)	91
Romania (Airplay 100)	59
Slovakia Airplay (ČNS IFPI)	42
Slovakia (Singles Digitál Top 100)	38
Sweden (Sverigetopplistan)	26
Switzerland (Schweizer Hitparade)	27
UK Singles (Official Charts)	11
UK Dance (Official Charts)	4
US Hot Dance/Electronic Songs (Billboard)	11

=== Year-end charts ===
Chart (2021)	Position
Australia (ARIA)	82
Austria (Ö3 Austria Top 40)	42
Belgium (Ultratop Flanders)	16
Belgium (Ultratop Wallonia)	61
Hungary (Dance Top 40)	38
Hungary (Single Top 40)	81
Netherlands (Dutch Top 40)	54
Netherlands (Single Top 100)	52
Poland (ZPAV)	25
Switzerland (Schweizer Hitparade)	70
UK Singles (OCC)	61
US Hot Dance/Electronic Songs (Billboard)	30

Chart (2022)	Position
Belgium (Ultratop 50 Flanders)	119
Hungary (Dance Top 40)	34

=== Sales and certifications ===
Region	Certification	Certified units/sales
Australia (ARIA)	Platinum	70,000^{‡}
Belgium (BRMA)	Gold	20,000^{‡}
Denmark (IFPI Danmark)	Gold	45,000^{‡}
Germany (BVMI)	Gold	200,000^{‡}
Hungary (MAHASZ)	3× Platinum	12,000^{‡}
Italy (FIMI)	Platinum	70,000^{‡}
Mexico (AMPROFON)	Gold	70,000^{‡}
Poland (ZPAV)	Platinum	50,000^{‡}
Spain (Promusicae)	Platinum	60,000^{‡}
Switzerland (IFPI Switzerland)	Platinum	20,000^{‡}
United Kingdom (BPI)	Platinum	600,000^{‡}
United States (RIAA)	Gold	500,000^{‡}
^{‡} Sales+streaming figures based on certification alone.

== Other versions ==
- Finnish punk rock band Sleepy Sleepers recorded a Finnish parody of "Rasputin" on their 1978 album The Mopott Show.
- Mona Carita covered the song in Finnish in 1979.
- American ska punk band We Are the Union did a cover of the song.
- American Celtic punk band Boiled in Lead did a cover of the song on their album Antler Dance.
- Norwegian singer AURORA released an acoustic cover in 2021.

== Inspirations and use in other media ==
"Rasputin" has inspired multiple songs and has been featured in films, video games and television programmes.

- Jatin–Lalit were inspired by "Rasputin", and they used a similar composition in their song "Sacchi Ye Kahani Hai", from the soundtrack of the film Kabhi Haan Kabhi Naa (1994).
- “Rasputin” is featured in the 2010 rhythm game Just Dance 2. The choreography the song is set to trended on TikTok in 2021 and is responsible for the song's resurgence.
- In the 2003 Malayalam film Balettan, the song "Baletta Baletta" was inspired by "Rasputin". The song was composed by M. Jayachandran.
- The Thai version of the song is ยิ่งเมายิ่งมัน (Ying Mao Ying Mun) was sung by Suchart Thianthong in 2005.
- Cantonese version was sung by Tsui Siu-Ming, titled Acnes (青春痘) in 1980, and covered by Ronald Cheng and Lam Chi-chung in a 2006 comedy film Undercover Hidden Dragon (zh:至尊無賴).
- Mandarin version was sung by Frankie Kao (高凌風), titled The One in My Heart (心上人).
- The 2012 Indian film Agent Vinod features a Hindi-language song titled "I'll Do the Talking Tonight" which features a similar tune to that of "Rasputin".
- The Turkish TV series Seksenler (English: "The Eighties") used the song in its first episode.
- The song was featured in the promotion for the 2021 film The King's Man.
- The song is heard in the 2022 Doctor Who special "The Power of the Doctor", in which the Master (Sacha Dhawan), posing as Rasputin, dances to it. While he is dancing, a Dalek and a Cyberman glance at each other in confusion.
- The song was featured in the 2026 Indian spy thriller film, Dhurandhar: The Revenge.

== See also ==
- Dschinghis Khan, a 1979 disco song about Genghis Khan
- Josephine Superstar, Phylicia Rashad's 1978 disco concept album about the life of Josephine Baker
