= Boney M. discography =

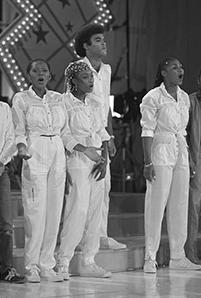
- Boney M. in 1981
- Studio albums: 8
- Singles: 55

The discography of German disco group Boney M. includes 8 studio albums, 55 singles, and numerous compilation albums.

== Albums ==
=== Studio albums ===
Title	Album details	Peak chart positions										Certifications
Title	Album details	GER	AUS	AUT	CAN	NLD	NOR	NZ	SWE	UK	US	Certifications
Take the Heat off Me	Released: June 1976; Label: Hansa; Formats: LP, cassette	2	26	6	—	5	2	34	1	40	—	GER: Gold; UK: Silver
Love for Sale	Released: May 1977; Label: Hansa; Formats: LP, cassette	1	27	1	—	2	2	22	1	13	—	GER: Platinum; UK: Gold
Nightflight to Venus	Released: June 1978; Label: Hansa; Formats: LP, cassette	1	7	1	7	1	1	3	1	1	134	GER: 2× Platinum; CAN: 5× Platinum; NLD: Gold; UK: Platinum
Oceans of Fantasy	Released: September 1979; Label: Hansa; Formats: LP, cassette	1	21	1	44	3	1	5	5	1	—	GER: Platinum; NLD: Platinum; UK: Platinum
Boonoonoonoos	Released: September 1981; Label: Hansa; Formats: LP, cassette	15	—	14	—	35	21	—	31	—	—	
Christmas Album	Released: December 1981; Label: Hansa; Formats: LP, cassette	14	53	—	80	42	10	—	—	—	—	AUS: Gold; CAN: 2× Platinum
Ten Thousand Lightyears	Released: May 1984; Label: Hansa; Formats: LP, cassette, CD	23	—	—	—	—	—	—	—	—	—	
Eye Dance	Released: October 1985; Label: Hansa; Formats: LP, cassette	—	—	—	—	—	—	—	—	—	—	
"—" denotes releases that did not chart or not available.

=== Charting and/or certified compilation albums ===
Title	Album details	Peak chart positions										Certifications
Title	Album details	GER	AUS	AUT	CAN	NLD	NZ	NOR	SWE	SWI	UK	Certifications
The Magic of Boney M. – 20 Golden Hits	Released: April 1980; Label: Hansa; Formats: LP, cassette	2	3	5	16	2	2	14	30	—	1	GER: Gold; AUT: Platinum; CAN: Platinum; FIN: Gold; NLD: Platinum; SWI: Platinum; UK: Gold
The Best of 10 Years – 32 Superhits	Released: January 1986; Label: Hansa; Formats: LP, cassette, CD	3	—	—	—	—	—	—	—	—	35	
Greatest Hits of All Times – Remix '88	Released: October 1988; Label: Hansa; Formats: LP, cassette, CD	—	—	—	—	—	—	—	48	—	—	FRA: Platinum
The Greatest Hits of Boney M / The Village People	Released: October 1990 (with The Village People) (Available in Australia only); Label: Concept; Formats: CD, cassette, LP	—	68	—	—	—	—	—	—	—	—	
Daddy Cool – Star Collection	Released: 1991; Label: Ariola; Formats: CD, cassette	—	—	—	—	—	—	—	—	—	—	GER: Platinum
Happy Christmas	Released: November 1991; Label: Ariola; Formats: CD, cassette	—	—	—	—	—	—	—	—	—	—	GER: Gold
Gold – 20 Super Hits	Released: November 1992; Label: MCI; Formats: CD, cassette	5	40	6	—	2	2	6	14	5	—	GER: Gold; AUS: Gold; AUT: Platinum; FRA: Gold; NLD: Gold; NOR: Platinum
The Greatest Hits	Released: March 1993 (Available in UK only); Label: Telstar; Formats: CD, cassette	—	—	—	—	—	—	—	—	—	14	
More Gold – 20 Super Hits Vol. II	Released: October 1993; Label: MCI; Formats: CD, cassette	—	—	38	—	87	43	—	—	—	—	
The Best of Boney M.	Released: 1997; Label: Camden; Formats: CD, cassette	—	—	—	—	—	—	—	—	—	—	AUS: Platinum; FIN: Gold; UK: Gold
Norske Hits	Released: November 1998 (Available in Norway only); Label: Ariola; Formats: CD, cassette	—	—	—	—	—	—	17	—	—	—	
20th Century Hits	Released: November 1999; Label: MCI; Formats: CD, cassette	30	—	—	—	—	50	—	8	37	—	
25 Jaar Na Daddy Cool	Released: September 2000 (Available in the Netherlands only); Label: Ariola; Formats: CD, cassette	—	—	—	—	27	—	—	—	—	—	
The Greatest Hits	Released: 2001 (Available in UK, Australia & New Zealand only); Label: BMG; Formats: CD, cassette	—	78	—	—	—	—	—	—	—	66	UK: Gold
The Magic of Boney M.	Released: October 2006; Label: Sony BMG; Formats: CD, cassette	7	28	10	—	94	2	2	—	39	45	AUS: Gold; CAN: Platinum; FIN: Gold
Feliz Navidad – A Wonderful Christmas	Released: November 2010; Label: Farian (Sony Music); Formats: CD, cassette	93	—	—	—	—	—	—	—	—	—	
Best Of	Released: 2011; Format: CD; Label: Sony Music Germany	—	—	—	—	—	—	—	—	—	—	
The Essential Boney M.	Released: 27 August 2012; Label: Sony Music; Format: 2 × CD	—	—	—	—	—	—	—	—	—	—	UK: Gold
Diamonds	Released: 2015; Label: MCI; Format: CD	20	—	—	—	—	—	—	—	—	—	
Complete	Released: 7 Jul 2017; Label: Sony Music; Formats: 9 × LP box-set	—	—	—	—	—	—	—	—	—	—	
World Music for Christmas	Released: November 2017; Label: MCI; Formats: CD	53	—	—	—	—	—	—	—	—	—	
Gold	Released: November 2019 (Available in UK only); Label: Crimson (Demon Music Group); Formats: CD	—	—	—	—	—	—	—	—	—	41	
"—" denotes items which were not released in that country or failed to chart.

== Singles ==
Title	Year	Peak chart positions										Certifications	Album
Title	Year	GER	AUS	AUT	IRE	NLD	NZ	SWE	SWI	UK	US	Certifications	Album
"Baby Do You Wanna Bump"	1975	—	—	—	—	12	—	—	—	—	—		Take the Heat off Me
"Daddy Cool"	1976	1	5	1	—	3	15	1	1	6	65	GER: Gold; RMNZ: Platinum; UK: Platinum	Take the Heat off Me
"Sunny"	1976	1	36	1	4	1	17	11	2	3	—	RMNZ: Gold	Take the Heat off Me
"Ma Baker"	1977	1	5	1	4	1	2	1	1	2	96	GER: Gold; UK: Gold	Love for Sale
"Still I'm Sad"	1977	—	—	—	—	—	—	17	—	—	—		Love for Sale
"Belfast"	1977	1	57	2	1	3	—	—	1	8	—		Love for Sale
"Rivers of Babylon" / "Brown Girl in the Ring"	1978	1	1	1	1	1	1	1	1	1	30	GER: Platinum; FRA: Gold; NLD: Gold; RMNZ: Platinum; UK: Platinum	Nightflight to Venus
"Rasputin"	1978	1	1	1	3	5	4	—	2	2	—	AUS: Platinum; NLD: Gold; RMNZ: 3× Platinum; UK: Platinum	Nightflight to Venus
"Mary's Boy Child / Oh My Lord"	1978	1	33	3	1	2	8	1	1	1	85	GER: Gold; AUS: Gold; NLD: Gold; RMNZ: Platinum; UK: Platinum	Christmas Album
"Dancing in the Streets"	1979	—	—	—	—	—	—	—	—	—	—		Non-album track
"Painter Man" (UK/Ireland and Netherlands only)	1979	—	—	—	5	—	—	—	—	10	—	UK: Silver	Nightflight to Venus
"Voodoonight" (Japan only)	1979	—	—	—	—	—	—	—	—	—	—		Nightflight to Venus
"Hooray! Hooray! It's a Holi-Holiday"	1979	4	7	3	5	1	7	11	4	3	—	NLD: Gold; UK: Silver	Non-album track
"Gotta Go Home" / "El Lute"	1979	1	44	1	11	2	42	10	2	12	—	GER: Gold; NLD: Gold; UK: Silver	Oceans of Fantasy
"I'm Born Again" / "Bahama Mama"	1979	7	—	9	12	7	—	17	6	35	—		Oceans of Fantasy
"I See a Boat on the River" / "My Friend Jack"	1980	5	81	3	—	4	—	—	9	57	—		The Magic of Boney M. – 20 Golden Hits
"Children of Paradise" / "Gadda-Da-Vida"	1980	11	—	12	—	13	—	—	—	66	—		Non-album tracks
"Felicidad (Margherita)"	1980	6	—	6	—	—	—	—	3	—	—		Non-album tracks
"Malaika" / "Consuela Biaz"	1981	13	—	7	—	14	—	—	4	—	—		Boonoonoonoos
"We Kill the World (Don't Kill the World)"	1981	12	—	—	—	13	—	—	3	39	—		Boonoonoonoos
"Little Drummer Boy"	1981	20	—	—	—	—	—	—	—	—	—		Christmas Album
"6 Years of Boney M. Hits"	1982	—	—	—	—	—	—	—	—	—	—		Non-album tracks
"The Carnival Is Over" / "Going Back West"	1982	41	—	—	—	—	—	—	11	—	—		Non-album tracks
"Zion's Daughter"	1982	—	—	—	—	—	—	—	—	—	—		Christmas Album
"Jambo – Hakuna Matata (No Problems)"	1983	48	—	—	—	—	—	—	11	—	—		Non-album track
"Somewhere in the World"	1984	49	—	—	—	—	—	—	—	—	—		Ten Thousand Lightyears
"Kalimba de Luna"	1984	16	—	11	—	20	—	—	23	—	—		Kalimba de Luna – 16 Happy Songs
"Happy Song" (with Bobby Farrell)	1984	7	—	15	—	—	—	—	21	—	—		Kalimba de Luna – 16 Happy Songs
"My Chérie Amour"	1985	55	—	—	—	—	—	—	—	—	—		Eye Dance
"Young, Free and Single"	1985	48	—	—	—	—	—	—	—	—	—		Eye Dance
"Daddy Cool '86"	1986	—	—	—	—	—	—	—	—	—	—		Non-album track
"Bang Bang Lulu"	1986	—	—	—	—	—	—	—	—	—	—		Eye Dance
"Rivers of Babylon (Remix '88)"	1988	—	—	—	—	—	46	—	—	—	—		Greatest Hits of All Times – Remix '88
"Megamix"	1988	—	—	—	—	—	—	—	—	52	—	FRA: Gold	Greatest Hits of All Times – Remix '89 – Volume II
"The Summer Mega Mix"	1989	—	—	—	—	—	—	—	—	92	—		Greatest Hits of All Times – Remix '89 – Volume II
"Malaika (Lambada Remix)"	1989	—	—	—	—	—	—	—	—	—	—		Greatest Hits of All Times – Remix '89 – Volume II
"Everybody Wants to Dance Like Josephine Baker" (short available, withdrawn)	1989	—	—	—	—	—	—	—	—	—	—		Non-album tracks
"Stories"	1990	—	—	—	—	—	—	—	26	94	—		Non-album tracks
"Megamix"	1992	26	70	11	3	12	49	—	—	7	—		Gold - 20 Super Hits
"Brown Girl in the Ring (Remix)"	1993	—	—	—	25	—	20	—	—	38	—		Gold - 20 Super Hits
"Ma Baker (Remix '93)"	1993	—	—	—	—	—	—	—	—	—	—		More Gold - 20 Super Hits Vol. II
"Papa Chico" (featuring Liz Mitchell)	1994	—	—	—	—	—	—	—	—	—	—		More Gold - 20 Super Hits Vol. II
"Ma Baker (Somebody Scream)" (vs. Horny United/Sash!)	1999	28	—	19	11	34	9	10	21	22	—		20th Century Hits
"Daddy Cool '99" (featuring Mobi T.)	1999	47	—	—	16	—	—	19	49	—	—		20th Century Hits
"Hooray! Hooray! (Caribbean Night Fever) 2000"	1999	79	—	—	—	—	47	—	80	—	—		20th Century Hits
"Sunny (Remix) 2000"	2000	—	—	—	—	—	—	59	80	—	—		20th Century Hits
"Daddy Cool 2001"	2001	—	—	—	—	—	—	—	—	47	—		Greatest Hits
"Sunny (Mousse T. Remix)"	2006	—	—	—	—	—	—	—	—	—	—		The Magic of Boney M.
"Mary's Boy Child / Oh My Lord" (featuring Daddy Cool Kids)	2007	—	—	—	—	—	—	—	—	—	—		Christmas with Boney M.
"Felicidad America (Obama-Obama)" (featuring Sherita O. & Yulee B.)	2009	—	—	—	—	—	—	—	—	—	—		Non-album track
"Rasputin" (Majestic x Boney M)	2021	38	26	18	21	7	—	26	27	11	—	ARIA: Platinum; GER: Gold; UK: Platinum; US: Gold	Non-album track
"—" denotes a title that did not chart, or was not released in that territory.

== Videography ==
- Boney M – VHS, Mirror Vision (1981)
- Gold – VHS/VCD (in Hong Kong) (1993)
- Gold DVD (2001, Europe)
- Greatest Hits (2001, UK)
- Special Edition (2002, South Korea)
- Special Edition EP (2003, UK)
- The Magic of Boney M. (2006)
- Fantastic Boney M. – On Stage and on the Road (2007)
- Legendary TV Performances (2010)
- Diamonds (2015)

== See also ==
- List of best-selling music artists
