= Kalimba de Luna – 16 Happy Songs =

Compilation album by Boney M.
- Released: November 1984
- Recorded: 1979, 1980, 1981, 1982, 1983, 1984
- Genres: Reggae, Euro disco, R&B
- Length: 53:48
- Label: Hansa Records (FRG)
- Producer: Frank Farian

Boney M. chronology
Ten Thousand Lightyears (1984)	Kalimba de Luna – 16 Happy Songs (1984)	Fantastic Boney M. (1984)

Alternative cover
- The French LP cover art

Singles from Kalimba de Luna – 16 Happy Songs
- 1. "Kalimba de Luna" Released: July 1984; 2. "Happy Song" Released: November 1984

Professional ratings
Review scores
Source	Rating
Allmusic	3/5 stars

Kalimba de Luna – 16 Happy Songs is a compilation album by Boney M. released in late 1984. On the strength of two carbon-copy cover versions, "Kalimba de Luna" (Germany #17, 22 weeks - originally by Tony Esposito) and "Happy Song" (Germany #7, 16 weeks - original version by Baby's Gang) which gave Boney M. their first Top 20 hits in Germany in three years, this compilation was rush-released in November 1984. Besides the 12" versions of the two singles, the latter marking Bobby Farrell's return to the band but neither featuring Liz Mitchell or Marcia Barrett, the compilation includes 3-minute edits of tracks from albums Boonoonoonoos and Ten Thousand Lightyears as well as non-album singles "Children Of Paradise"/"Gadda Da Vida" (1980), "Felicidad (Margherita)" (1981), "Going Back West" (1982) and "Jambo - Hakuna Matata (No Problems)" (1983), as well as a new remix of "Calendar Song" from the Oceans Of Fantasy album. Just like in the case of 1980 compilation The Magic Of Boney M. - 20 Golden Hits, many of these edits were to re-surface on a number of hits compilations in the future, the latest being 2007 Sony-BMG release Hit Collection.
The "Happy Song" single was originally released under the name 'Boney M. with Bobby Farrell & the School-Rebels' and this compilation as 'Boney M. with Bobby Farrell'.

== Additional information ==
The artwork was a replica of that which Carrere (France) had used for their release of the Ten Thousand Lightyears album which had been renamed "Kalimba de Luna" - and the Carrere edition of Kalimba de Luna – 16 Happy Songs therefore was released with an alternative cover.

== 2007 re-issue ==
On August 31, 2007, the album has been remastered as part of the Boney M. re-issues series on Sony BMG and the song selection has been revised, leaving out the dublets from Ten Thousand Lightyears and Boonoonoonoos, instead seeing the original full-length single versions of "Going Back West", "Children Of Paradise" and "Gadda Da Vida" making their debut on CD for the first time. The CD also includes the 1993 songs, recorded by Liz Mitchell for "More Gold".

The original suggestion to also include the original single edit of "Ribbons Of Blue" as well as Liz Mitchell's 1991 single "Mocking Bird" / "Tropical Fever" was rejected so the album was trimmed to 14 songs, and the sub-title "16 Happy Songs" subsequently dropped.

== Track listing ==
Side A:

1. "Happy Song" (Abacab, Bacciocchi, Spagna) - 6:41
  - (1984) Non-album track. Edited Club Mix.
2. "Going Back West" (Jimmy Cliff) - 3:11
  - (1982) Non-album track. Edited version.
3. "Barbarella Fortuneteller" (Davis, Farian, Kawohl) - 2:54
  - (1984) From Ten Thousand Lightyears
4. "I Feel Good" (Bischof, Farian, Barzscht) - 3:04
  - (1984) From Ten Thousand Lightyears
5. "Consuela Biaz" (Courage, Farian, O'Hara) - 2:48
  - (1981) Edited version from Boonoonoonoos vinyl album.
6. "Jambo - Hakuna Matata (No Problems)" (Bischof, Harrison) - 2:49´
  - (1983) Non-album track. Edited version
7. "Jimmy" (Farian) - 2:56
  - (1982) Re-recording of track from Boonoonoonoos
8. "The Calendar Song (January, February, March...)" (Farian) - 2:22
  - (1984) New remix. Original version from the album Oceans of Fantasy (1979).

Side B:

1. "Kalimba de Luna" (Amoruso, DiFranco, Esposito, Licastro, Malavasi) - 7:18
  - (1984) Edited US Club Mix.
2. "Felicidad (Margherita)" (Conz, Massara) - 2:52
  - (1980) Non-album track. Edited version
3. "Living Like a Moviestar" (Bischof, Farian, Kawohl) - 2:56
  - (1984) From Ten Thousand Lightyears
4. "Gadda-Da-Vida" (Doug Ingle) - 2:59
  - (1980) Non-album track. Edited version.
5. "Somewhere in the World" (Davis, Grohe, Keilhauer) - 3:03
  - (1984) Edited version from Ten Thousand Lightyears re-issue 206 555-620
6. "African Moon" (Courage, Farian, Mitchell, Rulofs) - 3:00
  - (1983) Remix of track from Boonoonoonoos - edited version
7. "Children of Paradise" (Farian, Jay, Reyam) - 2:50
  - (1980) Non-album track. Edited version
8. "Boonoonoonoos" (Farian, Ehrhardt) - 2:12
  - (1981) Edited version of "That's Boonoonoonoos / Train to Skaville" excluding Larry Dillon's "Train to Skaville" elements.

== Personnel ==
- Liz Mitchell - lead vocals (A4-A8, B3, B5 & B6), backing vocals
- Frank Farian - lead vocals (B4), backing vocals
- Reggie Tsiboe - lead vocals (A1, A2, A3 & B1), backing vocals (except tracks A7, A8, B2, B4, B6, B7 & B8)
- Marcia Barrett - backing vocals
- Bobby Farrell - vocals & rap (A1 & B8)
- Cathy Bartney (La Mama) - backing vocals (A2, A3, A4, & B2), lead vocals (B4)
- Madeleine Davis (La Mama) - backing vocals (A1, A2, A3, A4, B1 & B2), lead vocals (B4)
- Patricia Shockley (La Mama) - backing vocals (A1, A2, A3, A4, B1 & B2), lead vocals (B4)
- Judy Cheeks (La Mama) - backing vocals (A1, A3, A4 & B1)
- Amy Goff - backing vocals (B1)
- Elaine Goff - backing vocals (B1)

== Production ==
- Frank Farian - producer

== Release history ==
- Germany: Hansa Records Hansa 206 745-620.
- 2017: Boney M. Complete, 9 × LP box set, Sony Music 88985406971

== CD releases ==
- 1984 Germany: Hansa 610 295-222.
- 1994 Germany: 74321 21265 2.

== 2007 CD edition ==
(Sony BMG 88697 09483 2)

1. "Happy Song" (Abacab, Ottavio Bacciocchi, Ivana Spagna) - 6:41
  - (1984) Non-album track. Edited Club Mix.
2. "Going Back West" (Jimmy Cliff) - 4:14
  - (1982) Non-album track. Original single version. Previously unavailable on CD.
3. "Jambo - Hakuna Matata (No Problems)" (Peter Bischof-Fallenstein, Teddy Kalanda Harrison) - 3:39
  - (1983) Non-album track. Original single version.
4. "Kalimba de Luna" (Giuseppe Amoruso, Gianluigi Di DiFranco, Tony Esposito, Remo Licastro, Mauro Malavasi) - 7:19
  - (1984) Edited US Club Mix.
5. "Felicidad (Margherita)" (Rosella Conz, Reno Massara) - 2:51
  - (1980) Non-album track. Edited version as on the 1984 release. Full-length single version available as a bonus track on 2007 CD release of Boonoonoonoos.
6. "Gadda-Da-Vida" (Doug Ingle) - 5:05
  - (1980) Non-album track. Original single version. Previously unavailable on CD.
7. "Children of Paradise" (Frank Farian, Fred Jay, Hans-Jörg Mayer [Reyam]) - 4:28
  - (1980) Non-album track. Original single version. Previously unavailable on CD.
8. "Ma Baker" (Frank Farian, Fred Jay, Hans-Jörg Mayer [Reyam]) - 4:02
  - Remix '93, radio edit.
9. "Time to Remember" (Dietmar Kawohl, Frank Farian, Peter Bischof-Fallenstein) - 4:00
  - 1993 recording featuring Liz Mitchell
10. "Da La De La" (Kerim Saka, Mike Wonder, M. Hanler Correl) - 4:00
  - 1991 recording featuring Marlon B. and Liz Mitchell, 1993 edited version.
11. "Papa Chico" (T. Esposito) - 4:05
  - 1993 recording featuring Liz Mitchell
12. "Lady Godiva" (Frank Farian, Peter Bischof-Fallenstein) - 3:33
  - 1993 recording featuring Liz Mitchell
13. "Hooray! Hooray! It's a Holi-Holiday" (Frank Farian, Fred Jay) - 3:55
  - (1979) Non-album track. Original single version. Previously unavailable on CD.
14. "6 Years of Boney M. Hits (Boney M. on 45)" (Arr.: Farian) - 4:47
  - (1981) Non-album track. Original single version. Previously unavailable on CD.

== Single releases ==
UK
7"

- "Kalimba De Luna" - 4:29 / "10.000 Lightyears" - 4:29 (Atlantic A 9619, 1984)
- "Happy Song" - 4:18 / "School's Out" (Vocal Version) - 3:15 (Carrere Records CAR 354, 1984)

12"

- "Kalimba De Luna" (12" Mix) - 7:05 / "10.000 Lightyears" - 4:29 (Atlantic A 9619 (T), 1984)
- "Happy Song" (Club Mix) - 8:10 / "School's Out" (Instrumental Version) - 3:35 (Carrere Records CART 354, 1984)

Germany
7"

- "Kalimba De Luna" - 4:28 / "10.000 Lightyears" - 4:29 (Hansa Records 106 760-100, 1984)
- "Happy Song" - 4:18 / "School's Out" (Vocal Version) - 3:15 (Hansa 106 909-100, 1984)

12"

- "Kalimba De Luna" (12" Mix) - 7:05 / "10.000 Lightyears" - 4:29 (Hansa 601 470-213, 1984)
- "Kalimba De Luna" (US Club Mix) - 9:15 / "Kalimba De Luna" (US Club Mix - Dub Version) - 6:40 (Hansa 601 532-213, 1984)
- "Happy Song" (Club Mix) - 8:10 / "School's Out" (Instrumental Version) - 3:35 (Hansa 601 555-213, 1984)
