= Consuela Biaz =

"Malaika / Consuela Biaz"

Single by Boney M.

from the album Boonoonoonoos
- A-side: "Malaika"
- Released: June 1981
- Recorded: 1981
- Genre: Pop, Disco
- Label: Hansa Records
- Producer: Frank Farian

Boney M. singles chronology
"Felicidad (Margherita)" (1980)	"Malaika / Consuela Biaz" (1981)	"We Kill the World / Boonoonoonoos" (1981)

"Malaika" / "Consuela Biaz" is a double A-side single by German band Boney M. and the first single taken from their fifth album Boonoonoonoos (1981). It peaked at #13 in the German charts, their lowest placing so far after their commercial breakthrough. Boney M. would use the double A-side format in this period, typically with the A1 being the song intended for radio and A2 being more squarely aimed at discos. "Consuela Biaz" was first promoted as the A-side in Germany where the group performed it in pop show Musikladen. After a promotional visit to Spain where the group found "Malaika" had become a Top 10 hit, the title was remixed and then promoted as the A-side. It was the second consecutive Boney M. single not to be released in the UK and Japan.

== Malaika ==
The original German and Spanish 4:30 single mix featured no percussion ad-libs and most notably, after the second verse it has a key-change to a drum / handclaps / a cappella chant before the song quickly fades. When producer Frank Farian remixed the song for the 12" single and a new 7" edit, he added more percussion and synth and deleted this key-change part and replaced with an outro with himself singing "Wimoweh, wimoweh" (deliberately borrowed from another African tune "The Lion Sleeps Tonight").
Lead Vocal: Liz Mitchell. Backing Vocals: Liz Mitchell, Marcia Barrett, Frank Farian, La Mama (Cathy Bartney, Patricia Shockley, Madeleine Davis).

== Consuela Biaz ==
A ballad story of a fictional character. A slightly different mix appeared on the original pressings, most notably including the line Tell me, is our dream about to end, sung by Frank Farian just before the second verse. The full remixed second version (5:20) appeared only on the Hungarian 7" single and the French 12" single until it was finally issued on The Collection in 2008. A 4:57 edit appeared on most single versions.
Lead Vocal: Liz Mitchell. Backing Vocals: Liz Mitchell, Marcia Barrett, Frank Farian.

== Releases ==
7" Single

- "Consuela Biaz" (Early version) - 5:05 / "Malaika" (Original single mix) - 4:30 (Hansa 103 350-100, Germany)
- "Malaika" (Single remix) - 5:02 / "Consuela Biaz" (Single remix) - 4:57 (Hansa 103 350-100, Germany)
- "Malaika" (Single remix) - 5:02 / "Consuela Biaz" (Unedited single remix) - 5:20 (Pepita SPSK 70518, Hungary)

12" Single

- "Malaika" (Long Version) - 5:42 / "Consuela Biaz" (Single remix) - 4:57 (Hansa 600 400-213, Germany)
