= Malaika =

1945 Swahili song by Adam Salim

Malaika Nakupenda Malaika is a Swahili song written by Tanzanian artist Adam Salim in 1945 and recorded for the first time by Kenyan musician Fadhili William. This song is possibly the most famous of all Swahili love songs in Tanzania, Kenya and in East Africa, as well as being one of the most widely known of all Swahili songs in the world. Malaika in this context means "angel" in Swahili, and this word has always been used by Swahili speakers to refer to a beautiful girl.

The lyrics of the song differ slightly from version to version; the title itself is subject to variation, such as "Ewe Malaika" (Oh, Angel) or "My Angel".

== Authorship and covers ==
Authorship of this popular song is still very controversial. However, most people accredit its authorship to Adam Salim, a not-well-published Tanzanian songwriter. Salim (born in 1916) composed this song while he was living in Nairobi between 1945 and 1946. According to this story, Adam Salim composed "Malaika" song in 1945 for his very beautiful girlfriend Halima Ramadhani Maruwa. Their parents disapproved of their relationship, and Halima was forced by her parents to marry an Asian tajir (wealthy man). Fadhili William, a Kenyan singer, is also associated with the song because he is the first person to record it. Producer Charles Worrod provides yet another version, crediting the song to Grant Charo, William's brother-in-law (see Ondevo 2006), a claim which is also associated with the fact that Fadhili William was the first person to record the song. Charo is not known to have confirmed this claim.

Another East African claiming to have written the song is Lucas Tututu from Mombasa.

Although Fadhili William has always insisted on his authorship of "Malaika", even providing a detailed description of the circumstances in which he wrote it, he is only recognized as the composer for royalty purposes. In any case, William was the first to record the song, together with his band The Jambo Boys, in 1960.

It was later re-recorded at Equator Sound Studios by the British-born Kenyan music promoter Charles Worrod, who marketed the ballad to eventually becoming an internationally acclaimed song.

Miriam Makeba's early recording helped make it famous throughout the continent and eventually the world. Her performances of the song brought it to the attention of such famous names as Harry Belafonte, Pete Seeger, Boney M, Usha Uthup and Angélique Kidjo.

The song has been covered by many other international artists such as the Hep Stars, Boney M, the Brothers Four, Helmut Lotti, Rocco Granata, Saragossa Band and is a staple for many African musicians. In 2023 South African music group The Soil recorded their own version inspired by the Miriam Makeba rendition from the 1980s.

== Lyrics and meaning ==
The lyrics of the song differ slightly from version to version, with verses commonly rearranged, omitted, or combined. The Swahili dialect is likely Tanzanian, possibly Kenyan. Kidjo's and Makeba's versions change the song considerably.

The early Fadhili William recording (1959) has only two verses. However, Miriam Makeba's recording has a third verse (the Pesa... verse) and a later record by Fadhili also has the Pesa verse.

The song is sung by a poor young man who wishes to marry his beloved "Angel" or "Little bird" but is defeated by the bride price.

== Hep Stars version ==
"Malaika"

Single by Hep Stars
- B-side: "It's Nice to Be Back"
- Released: April 1967
- Recorded: April 1967
- Studio: Europafilm Studios, Stockholm
- Genre: Soft rock
- Length: 2:48
- Label: Olga
- Songwriter: Fadhili William (credited)
- Producer: Gert Palmcrantz

Hep Stars singles chronology
"Consolation" (1966)	"Malaika" (1967)	"She Will Love You" (1967)

Audio
- "Malaika" on YouTube

=== Background ===
By the end of 1966, the Hep Stars had achieved ten top-10 hits in Sweden, while simultaneously enjoying their fifth number-1 single "Consolation". They had by now accounted to 10% of all record sales in the country, with specifically Benny Andersson, who composed most of their singles, enjoying the royalties. It was also around this time that the Hep Stars had decided that they wanted to star in a movie, in similar fashion to the Beatles A Hard Days Night and Help!. A person outside of the group decided that the majority of the film should be shot in Nairobi, the capital city of Kenya. The group started travelling to Kenya without a screenplay, with drummer Christer Petterson admitting that a coherent screenplay first was attempted aboard the airplane.

After arriving at Embakasi Airport (now Jomo Kenyatta International Airport), the group continued to film their projected movie during the morning hours. Their knowledge of "Malaika" was entirely coincidental, as during their stay at a hotel in the capital, the Hep Stars were eating dinner and were approached by a chef, who worked in the hotel restaurant. Having heard the statement that the Hep Stars were "the Swedish Beatles", he brought a guitar and started playing the song for them, much to their liking. After finishing shooting the Kenyan parts of their movie, the group travelled back to Sweden, and entered Europafilm Studios in April to record "Malaika" with Gert Palmcrantz producing.

=== Release ===
Liking the song, the single was released the same month, becoming their first single released in 1967. It was issued by their record label Olga Records with the catalogue number SO 38. The B-side was the Andersson composition "It's Nice to Be Back", which was intended as the closing song for the Hep Stars movie, upon their return to Stockholm.

The single first entered Kvällstoppen on 9 May 1967 at a position of number 4. The following week it had climbed all the way to number 1, a position it would prove to hold for five consecutive week. On 20 June it had descended to number 2, staying there for three weeks. On 11 July, it hit number 5 for one week, before descending to number 7, where it would stay for three weeks. On 8 August, it was at number 8 before traveling to number 9 the following week, a position it hold for one week. On 22 August, it descended to number 10, before exiting the top-10 for the first time on 29 August, where it was noted at number 15. "Malaika" was last seen on the chart on 5 September at a position of number 16. In total, "Malaika" spent 18 weeks on the chart, of which sixteen were in the top-10, ten were in the top-5 and five were at number 1. The single was also successful on Tio i Topp, where it reached number 6, spending two weeks on the chart. It was the only fully African language-song to reach number one on a Swedish chart.

=== Personnel ===
- Svenne Hedlund – lead vocals
- Janne Frisk – guitar, harmony vocals
- Lennart Hegland – bass guitar, harmony vocals
- Benny Andersson – piano, harmony vocals
- Christer Petterson – drums, harmony vocals

It is unclear who plays the flute solo on the recording.

=== Charts ===
Chart (1967)	Peak position
Sweden (Kvällstoppen)	1
Sweden (Tio i Topp)	6
Finland (The Official Finnish Charts)	24

== Boney M. version ==
"Malaika"

Single by Boney M.

from the album Boonoonoonoos
- B-side: "Consuela Biaz"
- Released: June 1981
- Recorded: 1981
- Genre: Pop, Euro disco
- Label: Hansa Records (FRG)
- Songwriter: Adam Salim
- Producer: Frank Farian

Boney M. singles chronology
"Felicidad (Margherita)" (1980)	""Malaika" / "Consuela Biaz"" (1981)	"We Kill the World / Boonoonoonoos" (1981)

Audio video
- "Malaika" on YouTube

Audio video
- "Consuela Biaz" on YouTube

The version by German band Boney M. is the first single taken from their fifth album Boonoonoonoos (1981). It peaked at #13 in the German charts, their lowest placing so far after their commercial breakthrough. Boney M. would use the double A-side format in this period, typically with the A1 being the song intended for radio and A2 being more squarely aimed at discos. "Consuela Biaz" was first promoted as the A-side in Germany where the group performed it in pop show Musikladen. After a promotional visit to Spain where the group found "Malaika" had become a Top 10 hit, the title was remixed and then promoted as the A-side. It was the second consecutive Boney M. single not to be released in the UK, and their first not to be released in Japan.

The original German and Spanish 4:30 single mix featured no percussion ad-libs and most notably, after the second verse it has a key-change to a drum, handclaps and a cappella chant before the song quickly fades. When producer Frank Farian remixed the song for the 12" single and a new 7" edit, he added more percussion and synth and deleted this key-change part, replacing it with an outro with himself singing "Wimoweh, wimoweh" (deliberately borrowed from another African tune "The Lion Sleeps Tonight").

=== Personnel ===
- Lead Vocal: Liz Mitchell
- Backing Vocals: Liz Mitchell, Marcia Barrett, Frank Farian, La Mama (Cathy Bartney, Patricia Shockley, Madeleine Davis).

=== Releases ===
7" Single

- "Malaika" (Original single mix) - 4:30 / "Consuela Biaz" (Early version) - 5:05 (Hansa 103 350–100, Germany)
- "Malaika" (Single remix) - 5:02 / "Consuela Biaz" (Single remix) - 4:57 (Hansa 103 350–100, Germany)
- "Malaika" (Single remix) - 5:02 / "Consuela Biaz" (Unedited single remix) - 5:20 (Pepita SPSK 70518, Hungary)

12" Single

- "Malaika" (Long Version) - 5:42 / "Consuela Biaz" (Single remix) - 4:57 (Hansa 600 400–213, Germany)

=== Charts ===
Chart (1981)	Peak position
Germany (GfK)	13
Austria (Ö3 Austria Top 40)	6
Netherlands (Single Top 100)	14
Switzerland (Swiss Hitparade)	4

=== 1989 Remix ===
"Malaika (Lambada Remix)"

Single by Boney M.

from the album Greatest Hits of All Times - Remix '89 - Volume II
- Released: October 1989
- Genre: Pop, Euro disco
- Label: Hansa Records (FRG)
- Songwriter: Adam Salim
- Producer: Frank Farian

Boney M. singles chronology
"The Summer Mega Mix" (1989)	"Malaika (Lambada Remix)" (1989)	"Everybody Wants to Dance Like Josephine Baker" (1989)

"Malaika (Lambada Remix)" is a 1989 single by German band Boney M., the only single taken from their remix album Greatest Hits of All Times - Remix '89 - Volume II. Although sampling bits of the original 1981 recording, it was more a re-recording than a remix since lead singer Liz Mitchell recorded new vocals for it, being the only member present on this recording since the other three original members Marcia Barrett, Bobby Farrell, Maizie Williams who had teamed up with singer Madeleine Davis had been fired by their producer Frank Farian.

Germany
7"

- "Malaika" (Lambada Remix) - 2:59 / "Baby Do You Wanna Bump" (Remix for the 90s) - 3:35 (Hansa 112 809–100, 1989)

12"

- "Malaika" (Lambada Remix - Long Version) - 5:02 / "Baby Do You Wanna Bump" (Remix for the 90s) - 3:50 / "Happy Song" (French Kiss Remix) - 5:17 / "Malaika" (Lambada Remix - Radio Version) - 2:59 (Hansa 612 809–213, 1989)

CD

- "Malaika" (Lambada Remix - Long Version) - 5:02 / "Baby Do You Wanna Bump" (Remix for the 90s) - 3:50 / "Happy Song" (French Kiss Remix) - 5:17 / "Malaika" (Lambada Remix - Radio Version) - 2:59 (Hansa 612 809–213, 1989)

== Sources ==
- Boney M
- Fantastic Boney M.
- Ogova Ondevo, "How Political Interference and Corruption Stifles Music Production in Kenya", Art Matters, 23 May 2006.
