= Somewhere in the World =

Single by Boney M.

from the album Ten Thousand Lightyears
- Released: May 1984
- Recorded: 1984
- Genre: Pop
- Length: 4:34
- Label: Hansa Records (West Germany)
- Songwriter(s): Wolfgang Keilhauer, Tammy Grohé, Sandy Davis
- Producer(s): Frank Farian

Boney M. singles chronology
"Jambo - Hakuna Matata" (1983)	"Somewhere in the World" (1984)	"Kalimba de Luna" (1984)

Audio video
- "Somewhere in the World" on YouTube

"Somewhere in the World" is a single by disco band Boney M., the only single to be released from their seventh studio album Ten Thousand Lightyears. Featuring the London Philharmonic Orchestra, the ballad marked another commercial low for the band when it peaked at #11 in the Swiss charts, and at #49 in Germany. The full length 5:07 version was released on the 12" single.
Lead Vocal: Liz Mitchell. Backing Vocals: Liz Mitchell, Marcia Barrett.

== Releases ==
7" Single

- "Somewhere in the World" (edit) – 4:25 / "Exodus (Noah's Ark 2001)" (edit) (Farian, Kawohl, Davis) – 4:37 (Hansa 106 320-100, Germany)

12" Single

- "Somewhere in the World" (extended mix) – 5:07 / "Exodus (Noah's Ark 2001)" (extended club mix) – 5:48 / "Wild Planet" (alternate mix) – 3:41 (Hansa 601 246-213, Germany)

== Chart ==
Chart performance for "Somewhere in the World"
Chart (1984)	Peak position
Germany (GfK)	49
