= Boonoonoonoos =

Studio album by Boney M.
- Released: October 1981 (Germany), November 20, 1981 (UK)
- Recorded: 1980–1981
- Genres: Rock, reggae
- Length: 59:39 (MC + 1994 CD 61:06)
- Labels: Hansa (FRG), Atlantic (UK)
- Producer: Frank Farian

Boney M. chronology
Children of Paradise – The Greatest Hits of Boney M. – Vol. 2 (1981)	Boonoonoonoos (1981)	Christmas Album (1981)

2LP cover
- Limited edition double album.

Singles from Boonoonoonoos
- 1. "Malaika"/"Consuela Biaz" Released: June 1981; 2. "We Kill the World (Don't Kill the World) / Boonoonoonoos" Released: November 1981

Professional ratings
Review scores
Source	Rating
Allmusic	link

Boonoonoonoos is the fifth studio album by Boney M.

== Background ==
Originally announced for a release on September 1, 1981, it was eventually postponed. Offizielle Charts cites an official release date of September 28, 1981. In Billboard of September 26, 1981, it is mentioned that the album "generated strong advance orders, spurring Hansa to press up 100,000 copies." However, it seems more likely that it hit the record stores towards the end of October as Boonoonoonoos first entered the German charts at No. 59 in mid-November and reached its peak at No. 15 already in the following week (November 23, 1981). In January 1982, it was reported it still had not sold gold after nearly three months on the market. An Ariola spokesman blamed the lack of a major hit single as a cause. It stayed in the German charts until March 8, 1982. It was the group's first new studio album in two years and marked the beginning of the group's commercial decline. In the UK where the group had come off 3 consecutive No. 1 albums 1978–80, Boonoonoonoos failed to chart at all. It also marked the last album to feature original member, the group's charismatic dancer Bobby Farrell, who was fired by the group's producer Frank Farian in November 1981, just weeks after the album's release.

== The recording of the album ==
The album reportedly cost 800,000 DM/$400,000 to record, and more than 100 titles were eventually demoed. The production costs further increased by employing the London Philharmonic Orchestra for the recording of Mike Batt's symphonic rock piece "Ride to Agadir". Despite producer Frank Farian having announced by the end of 1979 that Boney M. were to take a break, recording sessions for a new album began already in the first months of 1980, and the title "Boonoonoonoos" (a Caribbean word for "Happiness", derived from Latin "Bonus" = good) already appeared as one of the first completed tracks, a cover of Larry Dillon's ska-title "Train to Skaville", which was intertwined with new rap parts as "That's Boonoonoonoos". It was announced in fan club magazine Friends of Boney M. to be a new single in April 1980, but instead two new recordings, "I See a Boat on the River" and "My Friend Jack" were issued to promote The Magic of Boney M. – 20 Golden Hits.

Farian invited the singers Liz Mitchell and Marcia Barrett and his crew of musicians to Nice in the summer of 1980, where several new songs were recorded. A new double A-side single "Children of Paradise"/"Gadda-Da-Vida" was released in September, announcing the as yet untitled new album to be released in November '80. Despite heavy promotion all over Europe, the single peaked at No. 11 in Germany, their first not to enter the Top 10 and the first to be vetoed by Atlantic Records in the UK and Ariola Records in Spain. Worried by the declining success, Farian decided not to go ahead with a new album in November.

While new pressings of "Children of Paradise" now promoted "The Magic of Boney M." on the back cover, the band instead issued another single in December, a cover version of "Felicidad (Margherita)". "Felicidad", originally recorded by Italian band Massara as "Margherita (Love in the Sun)" in 1979, managed to get Boney M. into the German Top 10 again where it stayed for 27 weeks, becoming one of their longest-running chart entries, although it was once again not released in the UK and Spain. In the Netherlands, where Massara's version had been a hit, the B-side "Strange" was chosen as the A-side instead but failed to become a hit.

At the same time, singer Marcia Barrett issued the solo single "You" / "I'm Lonely", produced by John Edmed, and written by Kelvin James. Released in Germany in December 1980, and belatedly released in the UK in April 1981, the single failed to chart in either of the countries. Another song from the same sessions, "Breakaway", ended up on Boonoonoonoos as a Boney M. track with Frank Farian on lead vocals.

Atlantic UK finally decided to release "Children of Paradise" in the UK on January 30, 1981 – nearly 4 months after its continental release – but the single only stayed in the UK charts for two weeks, peaking at No. 66, their lowest chart entry yet. Also in February, Boney M. flew to Jamaica to record a TV special and perform live in concert with Rita Marley and shoot photos for the album cover. One of the final songs "Silly Confusion" was recorded in Bob Marley's Tuff Gong studios in Kingston.

A white-label pressing of the album emerged, presumably around April, featuring 11 tracks. None of the previous single releases were included. Apparently it was felt that the album did not have any strong lead single, as Frank Farian had Liz Mitchell and Marcia Barrett back in the studio in May to record a cover version of Fadhili Williams' "Malaika", released in June as a double A-side with the ballad Consuela Biaz.

Edited versions were now added to side 2 of the LP, now announced to be called Boonoonoonoos and given a release date of September 1, 1981. although it would be another two months before the album was eventually released. By December, a Limited Edition 2LP was released in Germany, France & the UK with slightly longer versions of some tracks.

== Singles ==
The first single to be lifted off the finished Boonoonoonoos album in Germany was double A-side "Malaika"/"Consuela Biaz" in June 1981 which became their second single not to reach the German Top 10, peaking at No. 13. Furthermore it was another single that Atlantic deemed unsuitable for the UK market and didn't release. Boney M. premiered "Consuela Biaz" on WWF on June 12, 1981, followed by "Malaika" on ZDF Disco on June 22. By then, Frank Farian had already remixed both tracks, and new mixes were circulating along with the original mixes.

"We Kill the World (Don't Kill the World)" was the second single, premiered on Showbizzquiz October 14, 1981. It was the first single in 4 years to have Marcia Barrett on lead vocals on the rocky up-beat part. The two-part single had a children's choir on the second ballad part. The single peaked at No. 12 in Germany and briefly returned the group to the UK Top 40. It found greater success in Spain and South Africa where it reached No. 1. The other side of the single featured a 5-and-a-half-minute edit of the album medley "Boonoonoonoos" which the group had already premiered nearly two months earlier in German Show-Express (September 10, 1981).

"Jimmy" was mentioned in UK fan magazine Friends of Boney M. as a new single in April 1982 after Bobby Farrell's exit from the group. A new and more up-beat version was recorded, but the single release was cancelled. Instead Farian offered it to Hansa label-mate Precious Wilson who declined it. Boney M.'s version would eventually be included on their Ten Thousand Lightyears album in May 1984.

== Maizie Williams and Bobby Farrell's recording debut ==
Boonoonoonoos marked Bobby Farrell's debut on record. Having previously only mimed to Frank Farian's vocals on TV (but having sung live in the group's concerts), Farrell was featured on the track "Train to Skaville" (part of the song "Boonoonoonoos", as a rapper). He also did the spoken intro on "We Kill the World".

Boney M. member Maizie Williams had also done a small part on "Train to Skaville" (featured in the group's TV special), and so the track would have been the first recording to actually feature all four group members, but her part was eventually re-recorded by Liz Mitchell for the released version of the song.

== Ein Sound geht um die Welt ==
Boney M.'s visit to Jamaica in February 1981* resulted in the TV-Special Ein Sound geht um die Welt (A Sound Goes Around the World) where they are seen performing to early mixes of songs recorded so far: Train to Skaville, Boonoonoonoos, Homeland Africa, African Moon, I Shall Sing, Ride to Agadir, We Kill the World. Furthermore the group is seen performing "Rivers of Babylon" with Rita Marley at a live concert. Prior to that their manager is seen running around the island to find the M. of the group's logo which has gone lost. The TV-special aired on December 12, 1981 when Bobby Farrell was no longer in the group.

The special released was on the DVD Fantastic Boney M. on 2007, also with a live concert from 1977.

*The Boonoonoonoos LP promo material states the footage was filmed in August 1981, but the first group photo from Jamaica was posted as a poster in German music magazine Bravo on February 19, 1981, and the group's return from Jamaica confirmed in a TV-performance of "Felicidad" on February 24, 1981 Also Marcia Barrett's UK single "You", released April 1981, featured a photo of the singer from Jamaica.

== The album cover ==
Although hundreds of photos had been taken during the group's trip to Jamaica, photographer Didi Zill did not manage to capture a satisfactory photo of Boney M. standing in the sea as the sun was setting too fast, and instead both front and back cover of the album were shot in a studio in Germany, the front cover with Boney M. posing as black silhouettes with raised hands against a setting sun on a red sky. The innersleeve featured a cartoon drawing of Jamaica on one side with the head line "Sun, Sea And Jamaica – That's Boonoonoonoos" with various small photos of the group. The other side with the song credits was originally supposed to have been a shot of the group posing in the Ocho Rios waterfalls, but due to Liz Mitchell's clothes being soaked, it was replaced with a photo of the group in a boat. The LP promo material promised the publishing of a photo book. This never materialised. The LP was released with a 6-fold poster of the album cover. The 1994 CD release and featured slightly alternate shots of both front and backcover.

== Track listing ==
Note: Tracklist based on cassette / CD releases. Lengths vary between LP releases, and there are numerous German Hansa releases with different mixes. Some LP's have "Consuela Biaz" as track B3 before "Malaika".

Side A:

1. "Boonoonoonoos" (Frank Farian, Giorgio Sgarbi, Catherine Courage, Fred Jay) – 4:37 / 4:50 (2LP)
2. "That's Boonoonoonoos / Train to Skaville" (Frank Farian, Larry Dillon, Rainer Maria Ehrhart) / "I Shall Sing" (Van Morrison) – 5:56 / 6:36
3. "Silly Confusion" (Frank Farian, Dietmar Kawohl, Mats Björklund, Harry Baierl, Catherine Courage) – 6:54 / 7:12 / 7:17
4. "Ride to Agadir" (Mike Batt) – 5:09
5. "Jimmy" (Frank Farian, Johan Daansen, Brad Howell) – 3:52 (LP) / 4:07 (MC, 2LP + CD)
6. "African Moon" (Frank Farian, Helmut Rulofs, Liz Mitchell, Catherine Courage) – 2:55 / 3:19

Side B:

1. "We Kill the World (Don't Kill the World)" (Frank Farian, Giorgio & Gisela Sgarbi) – 6:28
2. "Homeland Africa (Ship Ahoy)" (Kenneth Gamble, Frank Farian, Leon Huff) – 3:20 / 4:20
3. "Malaika" (Farian, Reyam, Traditional) – 2:48 (LP) / 3:27 (MC, 2LP + CD)
4. "Consuela Biaz" (Farian, Courage, O'Hara) – 3:50 (LP) / 4:37 (MC, 2LP + CD)
5. "Breakaway" (Kelvin James) – 3:46 (LP) / 4:18 (MC, 2LP + CD)
6. "Sad Movies" (John D. Loudermilk) – 3:22
7. "Goodbye My Friend" (Farian, Rulofs, Courage) – 5:10 (LP) / 5:25 (MC, 2LP + CD)

2LP Track List:
Disc 1: Side 1: A1-A3, Side 2: A4-A6
Disc 2: Side 3: B1-B3, Side 4: B4-B7

2007 CD reissue bonus tracks:

- 14. "Felicidad (Margherita)" – 4:39 (Massara, Conz)
- 15. "Strange" – 3:28 (Bobby Dobson)

== Personnel ==
- Liz Mitchell – lead vocals (A2, A5, A6, B3, B4, B6 & B7), backing vocals
- Marcia Barrett – lead vocals (B1, B5), backing vocals
- Frank Farian – lead vocals (A4 & B5), backing vocals
- Bobby Farrell – rap (track A2), spoken intro (B1)
- La Mama – backing vocals (A1, A3, B1 ("Don't Kill the World") & B3)
- Brian Paul – lead- and backing vocals (B1 ("Don't Kill the World"))
- Brian Sletten – backing vocals (B1 ("Don't Kill the World"))
- Dave King – bass guitar
- Günther Gebauer – bass guitar
- Helmut Rulofs – guitar
- Johan Daansen – guitar
- Mats Björklund – guitar
- Curt Cress – drums
- Keith Forsey – drums
- Harry Baierl – keyboards
- Kristian Schultze – keyboards
- Max Greger Jr. – keyboards
- Dino Solera – saxophone (A5, A6)
- Tom Scott – saxophone (A1, B5)
- London Philharmonic Orchestra – orchestra (A4)

== Production ==
- Frank Farian – producer
- Christian Kolonovits – arranger
- Geoff Bastow – arranger
- Giorgio Sgarbi – arranger
- Harry Baierl – arranger
- Stefan Klinkhammer – arranger
- Tammy Grohé – sound engineer
  - Recorded at: Abbey Road Studios, London

               AIR Studios, London 
               Audio Studio, Berlin
               Atlantic Studios, Munich 
               Rainbow Studios, Munich 
               Union Studios, Munich 
               Vigilant Studios, Nice 
               Bob Marley Studios, Kingston Jamaica 
               Hitsville Recording Studios, Hollywood California 

- Mixing and vocal recording at Farian Studios in Germany

== Charts ==
=== Weekly charts ===
Chart (1981–82)	Peak position
Austrian Albums (Ö3 Austria)	14
Finnish Albums (Suomen virallinen lista)	7
Dutch Albums (Album Top 100)	35
German Albums (Offizielle Top 100)	15
Norwegian Albums (VG-lista)	21
Swedish Albums (Sverigetopplistan)	31
Chart (2020)	Peak position
Portuguese Albums (AFP)	42

== Certifications and sales ==
Region	Certification	Certified units/sales
Germany	—	~250,000
Hong Kong (IFPI Hong Kong)	Gold	10,000^{*}
Spain (Promusicae)	Platinum	100,000^{^}
Yugoslavia	—	59,032
^{*} Sales figures based on certification alone.^{^} Shipments figures based on certification alone.

== Reissued ==
- 1994: CD, BMG 74321 21267 2
- 2007: CD, Sony BMG Music Entertainment 88697094802
- 2011: Boney M. Original Album Classics, 5 × CD box set, Sony Music 88697928702
- 2017: Boney M. Complete, 9 × LP box set, Sony Music 88985406971
