= Felicidad (Margherita) =

Single by Boney M
- Released: December 1980
- Recorded: 1980
- Genre: Reggae, Euro disco, R&B
- Length: 4:58 (First mix); 4:31 (Final mix)
- Label: Hansa Records (FRG)
- Songwriters: Pino Massara, Rosella Conz
- Producer: Frank Farian

Boney M singles chronology
"Children of Paradise" / "Gadda-Da-Vida" (1980)	"Felicidad (Margherita)" (1980)	"Malaika / Consuela Biaz" (1981)

"Felicidad (Margherita)" is a 1980 single by German band Boney M., not included in any original album by the group. It returned the group to the German Top 10, peaking at #6 but was not released in either the UK or Spain. In the Netherlands, the B-side "Strange" was chosen as the A-side track. "Felicidad" and its B-side "Strange" were included in the 2 x 12" set Boney M. for Dancin' and were added as bonus tracks to the 2007 re-issue of Boney M.'s Boonoonoonoos album.

== Felicidad (Margherita) ==
Boney M.'s version was a cover of Italian artist Massara's 1979 summer hit "Margherita (Love In The Sun)" which was sung in Italian and was released in English in the UK under the title "Margarita (Mamma, Oh Mamma)". It borrowed the title "Felicidad" (Spanish for "Happiness") from the chorus of the Italian version ("Felicità"), substituting the line "Love in the Sun" from Massara's English version. Owing to a frosty relationship to the group's members at the time, producer Frank Farian tried to record it with session singers La Mama (Cathy Bartney, Patricia Shockley, Madeleine Davis) and himself only on vocals but was forced by record company Hansa to overdub Boney M. singers Liz Mitchell and Marcia Barrett's vocals.

First pressings of the single feature a 4:58 mix which includes the fourth verse My anticipation, no I cannot delay. It doesn't fade in the third chorus but fades drastically as La Mama can be heard singing the lines Mama mama mama ... on their own. The second mix fades at 4:33 (in the middle of the chorus) and was issued on the French 7" single. The third and final mix (4:31) edits out the fourth verse and fades at the end of the third chorus. In Italy, the single was released backed with "Children of Paradise", while an early German test pressing has "Calendar Song" from "Oceans of Fantasy" on the B-side.

The German 12" single featured an 11:46 mix of the song while the French 12" single featured an alternate mix, running a full 12 minutes.

== Releases ==
7" Single

- "Felicidad (Margherita)" – 4:58 / "Strange" (Bobby Dobson) – 3:18 (Hansa 102 681-100, Germany)
- "Felicidad (Margherita)" (Final mix) – 4:31 / "Strange" – 3:28 (Hansa 102 681-100, Germany)
- "Felicidad (Margherita)" (Second edit) – 4:33 / "Strange" – 3:18 (Carrere 49.709, France)

12" Single

- "Felicidad (Margherita)" (Long version) – 11:46 / "Strange" – 3:28 (Hansa 600 311-213, Germany)
- "Felicidad (Margherita)" (Long version) – 12:00 / "Strange" – 3:28 (Carrere 8.107, France)

== Felicidad America (Obama-Obama) ==
"Felicidad America (Obama-Obama)"

Single by Boney M. featuring Sherita O. and Yulee B.
- Released: January 16, 2009
- Recorded: 2008
- Genre: Reggae, Euro disco, R&B
- Label: Sony-BMG (FRG)
- Songwriters: Pino Massara, Rosella Conz
- Producer: Frank Farian

Boney M. singles chronology
"Sunny (Mousse T. Remix)" (2006)	"Felicidad America (Obama-Obama)" (2009)

Music video
- "Felicidad America (Obama-Obama)" on YouTube

Paying tribute to the newly elected president of the United States of America, Barack Obama, Frank Farian re-recorded Boney M.'s 1980 hit with singers Sherita O. (previously from girl group Gift) and Yulee B. with slightly re-written lyrics. The single is available in an English and a Spanglish version.

== Charts ==
Chart (1981)	Peak position
Argentina (Singles Sales)	13
