= We Kill the World/Boonoonoonoos =

"We Kill the World (Don't Kill the World)" / "Boonoonoonoos"

Single by Boney M.

from the album Boonoonoonoos
- Released: November 1, 1981
- Recorded: 1980–81
- Genre: Pop, gospel
- Label: Hansa Records
- Producer: Frank Farian

Boney M. singles chronology
"Malaika / Consuela Biaz" (1981)	""We Kill the World (Don't Kill the World)" / "Boonoonoonoos"" (1981)	"The Little Drummer Boy" / "6 Years of Boney M. Hits" (1981)

Audio video
- "We Kill the World (Don't Kill the World)" on YouTube

Audio video
- "Boonoonoonoos" on YouTube

"We Kill the World (Don't Kill the World)" / "Boonoonoonoos"" is a double A-side single by German band Boney M., the second single released from their 5th album Boonoonoonoos. The single was a South-African and Spanish number 1 hit and peaked at number 12 in Germany. In the UK, it fared better than their previous two singles, peaking at number 39. Boney M. would use the double A-side format in this period, typically with the A1 being the song intended for radio and A2 being more squarely aimed at discos. The sides would usually be switched on the accompanying 12" single.

== We Kill the World (Don't Kill the World) ==
"We Kill the World" was the second only Boney M. single to feature a lead vocal by Marcia Barrett and the first to feature vocals (a spoken part, the spoken intro of the song) by male dancer Bobby Farrell. Composed by Frank Farian and Italian couple Giorgio & Gisela Sgarbi, the song consisted of an uptempo rock part "We Kill the World" and a ballad part "Don't Kill the World", led by Brian Paul. He was a young boy who together with his friend Brian Sletten eventually sang all of the children's vocals themselves. They also appeared with the group in a number of TV shows when they promoted the song.

The song was released in various edits. The first German single pressing featured a 6:05 edit which included a rare fourth verse (lyrics of which were printed on the poster included in the album). Later edits omitted the fourth verse (just as most album versions) and the guitar solo in "Don't Kill the World" (5:38). In Canada and South Africa, a 4:49 edit excluded third and fourth verse. In the UK, the single featured the album edit of "We Kill the World" and a shortened "Don't Kill the World". Boney M. promoted this edit on TV. The original full-length version of 7:51 min. (as credited on the Hansa 12" label) remains unreleased. On the 12" single, the 6:33 album version was released.

"We Kill the World" - Lead Vocal: Marcia Barrett. Spoken Vocal: Bobby Farrell. Backing Vocals: Frank Farian, Liz Mitchell ( lead vocals Don't kill the world )

"Don't Kill the World" - Lead Vocal: Brian Paul. Backing Vocals: Brian Paul, Brian Sletten, Liz Mitchell, Frank Farian, Marcia Barrett, La Mama (Cathy Bartney, Patricia Shockley, Madeleine Davis)

== Boonoonoonoos ==
The album version of Boonoonoonoos (Caribbean slang for "Happiness") consisted of three different songs:

- Boonoonoonoos (Frank Farian, Giorgio Sgarbi, Catherine Courage, Fred Jay)
- That's Boonoonoonoos (Frank Farian, Rainer Maria Ehrhart) / Train to Skaville (Larry Dillon)
- I Shall Sing (Van Morrison)

The single edit was cut from the full-length 12:08 to 5:38, then a few bars were edited out for a 5:26 version, and in Spain an earlier fade resulted in a 5:15 edit. The original (still unreleased) single edit was 4:56 according to the label timing. The 12" version was identical to the Limited Edition 2LP version of 11:23 min. despite being credited as 9:26 on the label.

== Releases ==
7" Singles

- "We Kill the World (Don't Kill the World)" - 5:38 / "Boonoonoonoos" - 5:35 (Hansa 103 666-100, Germany)
- "We Kill the World (Don't Kill the World)" - 6:05 / "Boonoonoonoos" - 5:15 (Ariola B-103 316, Spain)
- "We Kill the World (Don't Kill the World)" - 4:49 / "Boonoonoonoos" (Track 1 from the album) - 4:37 (Gallo PD 2005)
- "We Kill the World (Don't Kill the World)" - 6:05 / "Boonoonoonoos" - 5:26 (Atlantic K11689, UK)

12" Singles

- "Boonoonoonoos" (Track 1 and 2 from the album, plays continuously) - 11:23 / "We Kill the World (Don't Kill the World)" - 6:33 (Hansa 600 455-213, Germany)
- "We Kill the World (Don't Kill the World)" - 6:33 / "6 Years of Boney M. Hits" - 13:26 (K11689T, UK)

== Charts and certifications ==
=== Weekly charts ===
Chart (1981–1982)	Peak position
Belgium (Ultratop 50 Flanders)	21
Finland (Suomen virallinen lista)	19
France (SNEP)	63
Netherlands (Single Top 100)	13
Netherlands (Dutch Top 40)	25
South Africa (Springbok Radio)	1
Spain (AFYVE)	1
Switzerland (Schweizer Hitparade)	3
UK Singles (OCC)	39
West Germany (GfK)	12
