= Kalimba de Luna =

Single by Tony Esposito

Single by Tony Esposito

from the album Il grande esploratore
- Released: 1984
- Recorded: 1982
- Genre: Pop
- Length: 3:50 (7" mix); 5:13 (12" mix)
- Label: Bubble Record – BLU 9227
- Songwriters: Tony Esposito; Mauro Malavasi; Remo Licastro; Giuseppe Amoruso; Gianluigi Di Franco
- Producers: Mauro Malavasi; Willy David

"Kalimba de Luna" is a 1982 single by Italian musician and drummer Tony Esposito. It was written by Esposito with his long-time collaborator Remo Licastro, pianist Giuseppe "Joe" Amoruso, keyboardist Mauro Malavasi and vocalist Gianluigi Di Franco. It was taken from Esposito's album Il grande esploratore (The great explorer). "Kalimba de Luna" was a European success and reached no. 12 in the Austrian chart, no. 6 in the Swiss charts and no. 5 in the Italian charts.

== Reception ==
Italian writer Rocco Bargioni in his book In Pista! said that Esposito "has always sought to recreate exotic sounds and rhythms without losing sight of his Mediterranean roots. Listening to one of his albums takes your mind to the most diverse cultures and places around the world, and Kalimba De Luna, despite its obvious radio appeal, is certainly no exception".

== Charts ==
Chart (1984)	Peak position
Austria (Ö3 Austria Top 40)	12
Switzerland (Schweizer Hitparade)	6
West Germany (GfK)	25

== Boney M. version ==
"Kalimba de Luna"

Single by Boney M.

from the album Ten Thousand Lightyears
- Released: August 1984
- Recorded: 1982
- Studio: Far Studios, Rosbach
- Genre: Pop
- Length: 4:31 (7" mix); 3:26 (LP edit); 7:07 (12" mix); 9:15 (Remix)
- Label: Hansa
- Songwriters: Tony Esposito; Mauro Malavasi; Remo Licastro; Giuseppe Amoruso; Gianluigi di Franco
- Producer: Frank Farian

Boney M. singles chronology
"Somewhere in the World" (1982)	"Kalimba de Luna" (1984)	"Happy Song" (1984)

"Kalimba de Luna" was instantly covered by German group Boney M. for the German market, giving the group their first Top 20 hit in three years, peaking at no. 16. It was added to their album Ten Thousand Lightyears, seeing it rise to No. 23 in the German charts in October 1984. It was also included on the Fantastic Boney M. and Kalimba de Luna – 16 Happy Songs with Boney M. compilations.

With lead vocals by new group member Reggie Tsiboe, the original idea was to release it as a solo single. A video was shot with Reggie only, before the plans changed to release it as a Boney M. single, and a new video with the group was done. Neither Liz Mitchell nor Marcia Barrett sang on this recording — the backing vocals were done by producer Frank Farian and session singers Amy & Elaine Goff and La Mama.

=== Weekly charts ===
Chart (1984–1985)	Peak position
Austria (Ö3 Austria Top 40)	11
Belgium (Ultratop 50 Flanders)	15
Bolivia	3
France (SNEP)	6
Netherlands (Dutch Top 40)	27
Netherlands (Single Top 100)	20
Spain (AFYVE)	5
Switzerland (Schweizer Hitparade)	23
Uruguay (CUD)	8
US Billboard Dance Club Play	49
West Germany (GfK)	16

=== Year-end charts ===
Chart (1984)	Position
Belgium (Ultratop 50 Flanders)	79
France (SNEP)	36

=== Releases ===
7" Single

- "Kalimba de Luna" – 4:31 / "10.000 Lightyears" (Kawohl, Björklund, Farian, Bischof) – 4:29 (Hansa – 106 760-100, Germany)

12" Single

- "Kalimba de Luna" (Club Mix) 7:07 / "10.000 Lightyears" – 4:29 (Hansa – 601 470-213, Germany)
- "Kalimba de Luna" (US Club Mix) 9:15 / "Kalimba de Luna" (Dub Mix) – 6:40 (Hansa – 601 532-213, Germany)

Note : This single is the first which does not have the name "Boney M." written with the logo created eight years before for the "Daddy cool" single (the only previous exception being the "Baby do you wanna bump" single, which went out before the group even existed)

== Other cover versions ==
- In August 1984 Boney M. recorded the song on a 45 rpm single (Carrere – CRE A 4777), included in the album Fantastic Boney M. (Hansa – 610 214-222).
- 1984 - Pepe Goes to Cuba released a cover for the German market (Teldec – 6.14211), reaching 17th place in the charts of their country. The song was included in the compilation ¡Que lo baile, Que lo baile! (Victoria – VLP-97), released in Spain.
- In the same year also Macho III they released a cover of it (Five Record – FM 13064), featured on the 2014 album I'm a Man/Roll (New Fresh Records).
- 1984 - Dalida recorded two versions: one in English language and one in French, text by Jean-Michel Bériat and Patrick Jaymes, in a single (Orlando International Shows – 13,604); the one in English was also remixed posthumously in 2010. The album of origin is Dali (Orlando International Shows – 66.215).
- 1984 - Robert Marton in the compilation Super Nonstop - 20 Ulkomaista Hittiä (M&T Tuotanto – NS1002), released in Finland.
- 1984 - Agnetha Lindh, single for the Swedish market (Planet Records – MOP 134).
- In 1984 Elvira in the album Top Ten 2 - Internacionalni Hitovi, text by Mišo Doležal (Jugoton – LSY-61977), published in Yugoslavia.
- 1987 - Sunshine Family, single (ZYX Records – 1340), released in Germany, Portugal and Spain; album España Boot Mix - Vol. 1/Dance Reunion Of The 70's (Galaxis – GLX 9038), released in Germany, Portugal and Poland.
- 1985 - Harry Holland & Dieter Reith, single for the German market (CBS – CBS A 6100); album Magic Accordion (CBS – CBS 26281), released in Germany, Israel and the Netherlands.
- 1985 - 7 Seinähullua Veljestä, single for the Finnish market, lyrics by Raul Reiman (Rondo – ROS 91); compilation Kesä-Hitit (Finnlevy – FTV 25), released in Finland.
- 1985 - Party Service Band on the album Neverending Party (Karussell – 825 764-4), released in Germany.
- 1991 - Saragossa Band on the album Party with Saragossa Band (ZYX Records – ZYX 55002-1), released in Germany.
- 1991 - Gipsy Rumba in the album Gipsy Rumba (Mistral Sound – CD 70060), released in Switzerland.
- 1994 - L.M. Project in the album Dance in Italy Vol. 2 (Prandi Sound Records – CD - 002).
- 1995 - Goombay Dance Band, single (Columbia Records – COLSAMP 2837 2), released in Germany; album Caribbean Beach Party (CMC Records – 8231562).
- 1996 - The Caribbeans on the album Macarena Party (BMG – 74321 40969 2).
- In 1999 Garcia with an EP released in Germany (Maad Records – 3984 27105-2), included in the compilation Deep 60 (Deep Records – DRCD 7/1999), released in Germany and Russia.
- 2000 - Yellow Mellow on the album Good Vibrations (Universal – 159 309-2), released in Austria.
- 2009 - In 2009, Martina Majerle, a Croatian singer, lent her vocals as a featured artist to a rendition of "Kalimba de Luna." This version of the song was released as a single and created in collaboration with the Chrisma Project and Mr. B.
- 2011 - Lorenzo Polidori in the album Kadin (Edizioni Musicali Bagutti – EB 404).
- On April 28, 2015 the Neapolitan rapper Clementino used a remixed version as a backing track for the song Luna (Moon). Although the lyrics are original by the rapper, the chorus is the same as the 1984 version.
- 2023 - Puritano feat. Tony Esposito on the album Chi diavolo è Puritano?! (Who the hell is Puritano?!) (Aldebaran Records – ALDBN072LP).
- xxxx - The Biggest in the album Hit Radio TV Vol. N. 6 (Aline Music – Al. 74), released in France.
