= Ten Thousand Lightyears =

Studio album by Boney M.
- Released: May 21, 1984
- Recorded: 1982–84
- Genre: Space disco
- Length: 48:52
- Label: Hansa (FRG)
- Producer: Frank Farian

Boney M. chronology
Christmas Album (1981)	Ten Thousand Lightyears (1984)	Kalimba de Luna – 16 Happy Songs (1984)

Alternative cover
- French LP release (Carrere)

Singles from Ten Thousand Lightyears
- 1. "Somewhere in the World" Released: May 1984; 2. "Kalimba de luna" Released: August 1984 (added on later pressings of the album)

Professional ratings
Review scores
Source	Rating
Allmusic	2/5 stars

Ten Thousand Lightyears is the seventh studio album by Boney M. and the first to feature new member Reggie Tsiboe, who had taken over Bobby Farrell's role as the band's leading man in early 1982.

== Background ==
After a break in the spring of 1983 when Liz Mitchell gave birth to her second child, and Marcia Barrett recorded demos with Eddy Grant, the band issued "Jambo – Hakuna Matata (No Problems)" backed with a new remix of "African Moon" from the Boonoonoonoos album.

During the winter of 1983/1984, new recordings were made, and the album was then given a whole new approach. It was supposed have been a continuation of the ethno-African themes, both musically and lyrically, of 1981's Boonoonoonoos, but after the miscalculation with "Jambo", most of the new tracks which ultimately ended up as the side A suite were given a science fiction theme, and the album title Ten Thousand Lightyears was chosen. The album was finally released in May 1984 and was also Boney M.'s debut on the new compact disc format, followed by a ARD TV-special airing in August.

The single chosen to promote the finished album was the ballad "Somewhere in the World"; it became the fourth consecutive Boney M. single not to reach the German Top 40. With the album only reaching #49 in the German charts in July, the second single "Living Like a Moviestar" and Frank Farian's planned duet single with Sandy Davis, a cover of Tommy Roe's "Dizzy" were both shelved.

== Kalimba de Luna ==
Frank Farian heard Tony Esposito's "Kalimba de Luna" and decided to immediately record it for the German market. Reggie Tsiboe was on holiday in his native Ghana and received the phone call to immediately return to Germany to record it. The original plan was to release it as a Reggie Tsiboe solo single, and a video was shot with Reggie only before the plans were changed to release it as a Boney M. single, and a new video with the group was done. When released in August, it gave the group their first Top 20 hit in three years, peaking at no. 16. The group promoted it on numerous TV shows through 1984/85. The album was reissued with an edited mix added to the track listing (and abbreviating "Somewhere In The World"). This pressing of the LP rose to No. 23 in the German charts in October 1984.

== Track listing ==
Original album, Hansa LP 206 200-620 / CD 610 140-222 (Germany, May 1984)
Side A:

1. "Exodus (Noah's Ark 2001)" (Farian, Dietmar Kawohl, Sandy Davis) – 5:19
  - (Promotional Album Mix 5:00 – alternate mix)
2. "Wild Planet" (Farian, Peter Bischof) – 4:06
  - Based on Omega's "Ajanlott utvonal" (János, László, György, Tamás, Ferenc) (1982)
3. "Future World" (Farian, Bischof) – 3:48
  - Based on Omega's "10.000 Lépés" (Presser, Adamis) (1969)
  - (Promotional Album Mix 4:12 – alternate mix)
4. "Where Did You Go" (Kawohl, Bischof) – 4:09
5. "10.000 Lightyears" (Kawohl, Björklund, Farian, Bischof) – 4:32
6. "I Feel Good" (Franz Bartzsch, Farian, Bischof) – 3:05
  - (Alternate Mix on Promotional Cassette 3:23, 2:15 edit on Promotional LP)

Side B:

1. "Somewhere in the World" (Wolfgang Keilhauer, Tammy Grohé, Davis) – 4:38
2. "Bel Ami" (Farian, Rainford, Bischof) – 3:12
3. "Living Like a Moviestar" (Farian, Kawohl, Bischof) – 3:04
4. "Dizzy" (Tommy Roe, Freddy Weller) – 3:26
  - (Unedited Mix on Promotional LP – 3:51)
5. "The Alibama" (Farian, George Reyam, Davis) – 3:05
  - (Unedited Mix with lead vocal by Sandy Davis on Promotional LP – 4:10)
6. "Jimmy" (Farian, Daansen, Howell, Liz Mitchell) – 3:02
  - 1982 re-recording
7. "Barbarella Fortuneteller" (Farian, Kawohl, Davis) – 2:58
  - (Unedited Mix on Promotional Cassette 3:08, 2:09 edit on Promotional LP)

Reissue Hansa LP 206 555-620 (Germany, September 1984)
Side A (as above)
Side B:

1. "Kalimba de Luna" (Tony Esposito, Mauro Malavasi, Remo Licastro, Giuseppe Amoruso, Gianluigi Di Franco) (Edit Version) – 3:26
2. "Somewhere in the World" (Wolfgang Keilhauer, Tammy Grohé, Davis) (Edit Version) – 3:10
3. "Bel Ami" (Farian, Rainford, Bischof) – 3:12
4. "Living Like a Moviestar" (Farian, Kawohl, Bischof) – 3:04
5. "Dizzy" (Tommy Roe, Freddy Weller) – 3:26
6. "The Alibama" (Farian, George Reyam, Davis) – 3:11
7. "Jimmy" (Farian, Daansen, Howell, Liz Mitchell) – 3:02
  - 1982 re-recording
8. "Barbarella Fortuneteller" (Farian, Kawohl, Davis) – 2:58

French Pressing Kalimba De Luna (Carrere Records, 66.189)
Side A (as above)
Side B:

1. "Kalimba de Luna" (Esposito, Malavasi, Licastro, Amoruso, Di Franco) (Long Version) – 7:00
2. "Somewhere in the World" (Wolfgang Keilhauer, Tammy Grohé, Davis) – 4:38
3. "Bel Ami" (Farian, Rainford, Bischof) – 3:12
4. "Living Like a Moviestar" (Farian, Kawohl, Bischof) – 3:04
5. "Dizzy" (Tommy Roe, Freddy Weller) – 3:26
6. "The Alibama" (Farian, George Reyam, Davis) – 3:11
7. "Barbarella Fortuneteller" (Farian, Kawohl, Davis) – 2:58

== Personnel ==
- Liz Mitchell – lead vocals (All tracks except "Dizzy", "Barbarella Fortuneteller" and "Kalimba de Luna"), backing vocals
- Frank Farian – backing vocals, rap on "Dizzy"
- Reggie Tsiboe – lead vocals "Wild Planet", "Barbarella Fortuneteller" and "Kalimba de Luna", backing vocals
- Marcia Barrett – lead vocal "Wild Planet", backing vocals
- La Mama (Madeleine Davis, Patricia Shockley, Judy Cheeks) – backing vocals "Future World", "I Feel Good", "Barbarella Fortuneteller", "The Alibama" and "Kalimba De Luna".
- Amy Goff – backing vocals "10.000 Lightyears", "Dizzy" and "Kalimba de Luna"
- Elaine Goff – backing vocals "10.000 Lightyears", "Dizzy" and "Kalimba de Luna"
- Bill Swisher – narrator on "Wild Planet"
- Sandy Davis – lead vocals "Dizzy", "The Alibama" (promotional-only LP version)
- Mrs. Hanson and Children – additional vocals on "Exodus"
- Max Greger – keyboards
- Curt Cress – drums
- Bronwen Collins – bassoon
- Johan Daansen – guitar
- Mats Björklund – guitar
- Pit Löw – keyboards
- Christian Schneider – saxophone
- Kristian Schultze – keyboards
- Dino Solera – saxophone
- Munich String Orchestra – orchestra
- London Philharmonic Orchestra – orchestra

== Production ==
- Frank Farian – producer
- Dietmar Kawohl – arranger
- Stefan Klinkhammer – arranger
- Harry Baierl – arranger
- Kristian Schultze – arranger
- Carmine Di – engineer
- Zeke Lund – engineer
- Ralph P. Rupert – engineer

== Charts ==
=== Weekly charts ===
Chart (1984)	Peak position
German Albums (Offizielle Top 100)	23

== Reissued ==
- 1994: CD, BMG 74321 21266 2
- 2007: CD, Sony BMG Music Entertainment 88697094822
- 2017: Boney M. Complete, 9 × LP box set, Sony Music 88985406971
