= La Mama (band) =

German band

- Origin: United States
- Genres: Pop, Disco, Dance-pop, Hi-NRG, Eurodance
- Years active: 1980-85
- Label: Hansa Records
- Members: Madeleine Davis (1980-85); Patricia Shockley (1980-85); Kathy Bartney (1980-82); Rhonda Heath (1985)

La Mama is a German pop and disco trio who worked in Frank Farian's studios in the first half of the 1980s. Adapting their name from New York theatre La MaMa Experimental Theatre Club, they released three singles and two albums and worked as backing singers on a number of recordings for other artists.

== History ==
The original members Madeleine Davis, Patricia Shockley and Kathy Bartney, all hailing from the United States of America, had settled in Germany in the late 1970s where they had done various session work. While singing backing vocals on ex-Silver Convention singer Ramona Wulf's album Shake What Yo Mama Give Ya, they were introduced to producer Frank Farian by guitarist Mats Björklund. He hired them for backing Precious Wilson on her debut album On the Race Track (1980) –at this time they had not yet adapted the collective name La Mama. Impressed with their harmonies, Farian also used La Mama to demo new songs for Boney M. –even doing one Boney M. recording, "Gadda-Da-Vida" with La Mama and himself doing all the vocals. Also several tracks on Boney M.'s 1981 album Boonoonoonoos ("Silly Confusion" in particular, "Don't Kill the World" and "Malaika") featured La Mama's uncredited backing vocals.

First single "Elephant Funk" / "In and Out" (1982) l-r: Kathy Bartney, Madeleine Davis, Patricia Shockley

While production on Precious Wilson's second album began late 1981, La Mama also commenced work on their first album, produced by Dietmar Kawohl and Mats Björklund. The Double A-side single "Elephant Funk" / "In and Out" was released in February 1982 ("In and Out" being the A-side on the 12" single) followed by a cover version of "Chanson D'Amour" a few months later. Neither single performed well commercially and the LP release was postponed. While Madeleine Davis had contributed lyrics for Precious Wilson's single "I Don't Know", the group also did backing vocals on Boney M.'s "Going Back West".

When their third single was released in December 1982, a cover of Labelle's "Voulez-Vous Coucher Avec Moi (Lady Marmelade)", lead singer Kathy Bartney had left the group after disagreements with Frank Farian, and when the group's LP Voulez-Vous Coucher Avec La Mama was released in January 1983, it sank without much notice. Meanwhile Farian started to use the vocals of singer Judy Cheeks –who had been signed to Ariola Records between 1977 and 1980. It must however be noticed that Judy Cheeks wasn't a member of La Mama. Farian just used her vocals on various projects together with Madeleine Davis and Patricia Shockley.

Farian had Madeleine Davis and Patricia Shockley of La Mama together with Judy Cheeks record a medley of contemporary hits for an Aerobics album Aerobic Fitness Dancing with instructions by Sydne Rome –the album topped the German charts early 1983 and had Farian remix the album without Sydne Rome's vocals for an unsuccessful album project MAD –For Dancin' in the summer of 1983.

1983 album "Voulez-Vous Coucher Avec La Mama"

Also during 1983, La Mama once again contributed uncredited backing vocals to Boney M.'s seventh album Ten Thousand Lightyears on the tracks "I Feel Good", "Barbarella Fortuneteller" and "The Alibama". By the end of the year, Precious Wilson's final album for Hansa, Funky Fingers –a medley-album of popular R&B, soul and disco classics –was released. The first edition of the album credited just Precious Wilson while the second edition credited Precious Wilson & La Mama. Lacking any promotion by the record company, the album was unsuccessful and quickly disappeared.

During 1984, La Mama backed Boney M. on the single "Happy Song" which featured rap of Bobby Farrell, and originally released under Boney M. with Bobby Farrell and The School Rebels and participated as a part of Frank Farian Corporation on the benefit single "Mother and Child Reunion" early 1985. At this time ex-Silver Convention member Rhonda Heath stepped in for session work on Boney M.'s final album Eye Dance on which Madeleine Davis and Patricia Shockley of La Mama also took part. They sang the choruses on the tracks "Todos Buenos" and "Give It Up". Before the group finally split, Patricia Shockley and Rhonda Heath furthermore sang additional backing vocals on Far Corporation's hit single, a cover version of Led Zeppelin's "Stairway to Heaven".

In 1989, Madeleine Davis received a phone call by Boney M. member Maizie Williams who invited her to take the place of original lead singer Liz Mitchell who had just left the group. Davis appeared in the group's official video of "The Summer Mega Mix", toured extensively with the group and also sang on their 1989 single "Everybody Wants to Dance Like Josephine Baker", not produced nor approved by Farian and subsequently withdrawn. Madeleine Davis now lives in Georgia, US, and works as a jazz singer.

== Discography ==
=== Albums ===
- Voulez-Vous Coucher Avec La Mama (January 1983)
- Funky Fingers (with Precious Wilson) (December 1983)

=== Singles ===
- "Elephant Funk" / "In and Out" (February 1982)
- "Chanson D'Amour" / "I'll Be Your Woman" (April 1982)
- "Voulez-Vous Coucher Avec Moi (Lady Marmelade)" / "They Call You V.I.P." (December 1982)
