= Young, Free and Single =

Single by Boney M. featuring Bobby Farrell

from the album Eye Dance
- Released: September 1985
- Length: 4:18 (7" mix); 8:08 (12" mix)
- Label: Hansa Records (FRG); Carrere (UK)
- Composer: Frank Farian
- Lyricists: Robert Rayen, Mary S. Applegate
- Producer: Frank Farian

Boney M. featuring Bobby Farrell singles chronology
"My Chérie Amour" (1985)	"Young, Free and Single" (1985)	"Daddy Cool (Anniversary Recording '86)" (1986)

Official audio
- Young, Free and Single (7" Version) on YouTube

"Young, Free and Single" is a single by German band Boney M., taken from their final album Eye Dance (1985). Only a modest hit, the single peaked at #49 in the German charts. Being a novelty record, the lyrics were about a radio talkshow for dating. Male dancer Bobby Farrell was featured in heavily disguised vocoder vocals in the verses while Reggie Tsiboe did the lead vocals on the chorus. The B-side Blue Beach was an instrumental dub version.

The 7" mix, although almost the same length as the album cut, differs from it, the opening ("welcome to the radio show...) being this of the 12" mix.

== Releases ==
7" Singles

- "Young, Free and Single" - 4:18 / "Blue Beach" (Farian) - 4:00 (Hansa 107 604-100, Germany)
- "Young, Free and Single" - 4:18 / "Chica da Silva" (Farian, Reyam, Courage) - 4:35 (Carrere, UK)

12" Singles

- "Young, Free and Single" (Club Mix) - 8:08 / "Blue Beach" - 4:00 (Hansa 601 839-213, Germany)
- "Young, Free and Single" (Edited Club Mix) - 7:45 / "Blue Beach" - 4:00 (Ariola F-601 839, Spain)

== Sources ==
- Rate Your Music, detailed discography
- Boney M. discography at Discogs
- Allmusic, biography, discography etc.
