= Reggie Tsiboe =

Ghanaian-British entertainer, dancer, singer

- Born: 7 September 1950 (age 75); Kumasi, Gold Coast
- Origin: Birmingham, England
- Genres: R&B; eurodisco; reggae
- Occupations: Entertainer; dancer; singer
- Years active: 1975–present
- Labels: Hansa Records; Sony-BMG
- Formerly of: Boney M.

Reggie Tsiboe (born 7 September 1950) is a Ghanaian-British entertainer, dancer and one of the singers of the disco group Boney M. between 1982 and 1986 and later between 1989 and 1990.

== Career ==
During the 1970s, Tsiboe was a member of the group Sugarcane who had a 1978 hit with Bobby Bloom's "Montego Bay". The group also included Linda Taylor in its line up.

In 1981, having joined Boney M., Tsiboe originally replaced the dancer Bobby Farrell, but in 1984 Farrell rejoined the group and they became a quintet. In 1986, the original band split after 10 successful years, but in 1989 after an unexpected reunion of Boney M., Liz Mitchell and Tsiboe formed a new version of Boney M. and in 1990 released with the help of the producer Frank Farian the single "Stories" as Farian's response to another Boney M. lineup consisting of Bobby Farrell, Marcia Barrett, Maizie Williams, and Madeline Davis releasing the single "Everybody Wants To Dance Like Josephine Baker" which was an unauthorized release and legally withdrawn by Farian. A few months after the release of "Stories" both went their separate ways.

Tsiboe appeared on the last three Boney M. albums: Ten Thousand Lightyears (1984), Kalimba de Luna - 16 Happy Songs (1984) and Eye Dance (1985) and also recorded Christmas songs with the group, which were internationally released only after the split of the band on the new Boney M. Christmas album, The 20 Greatest Christmas Songs in 1986. Reggie sang the main vocals on a number of Boney M. songs, including "Kalimba de Luna", "Happy Song", "Going Back West", "My Chérie Amour", "Young, Free and Single", "Bang Bang Lulu", "Dreadlock Holiday", "Barbarella Fortuneteller", "Mother and Child Reunion" and the Christmas songs "Joy to the World", "Oh Christmas Tree", "The First Noël" and "Auld Lang Syne".

On 21 September 2006, Tsiboe and the two other lead singers of Boney M., Liz Mitchell and Marcia Barrett, were guests in London at the premiere of the musical Daddy Cool, which is based on the music of the group.

Before he joined the group he was a movie star in Ghana. He also released a few singles in the UK & Germany in the early 70s. One of the movies that gained him popularity was the film Love Brewed in the African Pot. Following his Boney M. period Tsiboe returned to acting. He has also starred in a few UK TV productions including Doctor Who.
