= The Summer Mega Mix =

Single by Boney M.

from the album Greatest Hits of All Times – Remix '89 – Volume II
- Released: May 1989
- Genre: Pop, Disco
- Label: Hansa Records (FRG)
- Producer: Frank Farian

Boney M. singles chronology
"Megamix" (1988)	"The Summer Mega Mix" (1989)	"Malaika (Lambada Remix)" (1989)

Audio video
- "Mega Mix (Radio Version)" on YouTube

"The Summer Megamix" is a 1989 single by German band Boney M. The single peaked at #11 in the French charts and #3 in Norway. In the UK, the single barely reached the top 100, peaking only at #92. The megamix is a medley of remixed Boney M. hits, "Sunny", "Hooray! Hooray! It's a Holi-Holiday", "Kalimba de Luna", "Ma Baker" and "El Lute".

== Releases ==
7"

- "The Summer Mega Mix" (Radio Version) - 4:28 / "The Calendar Song" (Remix) - 2:20 (Hansa Records 112 466-100, 1989)

12"

- "The Summer Mega Mix" (Extended Version) - 7:25 / "The Calendar Song" (Remix) - 2:20 / "The Summer Mega Mix" (Radio Version) - 4:28 (Hansa 612 466-213, 1989)

CD

- "The Summer Mega Mix" (Radio Version) - 4:28 / "The Calendar Song" (Remix) - 2:20 (Hansa 162 466-203, 1989)
- "The Summer Mega Mix" (Extended Version) - 7:25 / "The Calendar Song" (Remix) - 2:20 / "The Summer Mega Mix" (Radio Version) - 4:28 (Hansa 662 466-211, 1989)

== Sources ==
- http://www.hitparade.ch/showitem.asp?key=266371&cat=s
