= Everybody Wants to Dance Like Josephine Baker =

Single by Boney M.
- Released: October 1989
- Recorded: 1989
- Genre: Pop
- Label: PWL (UK)
- Songwriter(s): Sharkey, Cussack
- Producer(s): Barry Blue

Boney M. singles chronology
"Malaika (Lambada Remix)" (1989)	"Everybody Wants to Dance Like Josephine Baker" (1989)	"Stories" (1990)

"Everybody Wants to Dance Like Josephine Baker" is a 1989 single by German band Boney M. The words and melody were written by Kevin Sharkey, and the music was written by Pete Briquette. It was recorded by original members Marcia Barrett, Bobby Farrell, and Maizie Williams, and a new American member, Madeleine Davis, and produced by Barry Blue.

== Legal dispute ==
Advance copies of the song received positive reviews. However, their original producer, Frank Farian, did not participate in creating the single, but still owned the rights to the "Boney M." name, and decided to prevent sales of the single, prompting more than two decades of legal disputes over who is allowed to use the name and how.

In France, the single was released credited to Bobby Marcia Maizie Matalyne. To benefit from the fuss that was stirred by the record, Farian rushed out the single "Stories" with a competitive line-up featuring original lead singer Liz Mitchell, Reggie Tsiboe (who replaced Farrell in the group from 1982–86) and two new girls.

== Everybody Wants to Dance Like Josephine Baker ==
A tribute to famed singer and dancer Josephine Baker, the song featured lead and backing vocals by Marcia Barrett and a spoken part by Bobby Farrell. According to a now withdrawn biography by Marcia Barrett, the producers wanted to record Maizie Williams (who had never sung on Boney M.'s records) but try-outs proved unsuccessful. New member Madeleine Davis had another obligation when this song was recorded and couldn't be present in the studio when this was recorded—she did, however, add the chorus answer-back lines "Lose your self-control, feel it in your soul" etc.

Bobby Farrell re-recorded the song for a 1991 single credited to Boney M. feat. Bobby Farrell since he won the rights to use the name Boney M. in the Netherlands where he lived. The title was changed simply to "Josephine Baker", and it was backed with the song "Shame And Scandal". The single was a charity single in support of The Josephine Baker Children's Foundation.

== Custer Jammin' ==
The B-side track was a story about George Armstrong Custer and the Battle of the Little Bighorn. Madeleine Davis did the lead vocals although the key proved too low for her. Bobby Farrell did a spoken part, and Marcia Barrett backing vocals.

== Releases ==
UK
7"

- "Everybody Wants To Dance Like Josephine Baker" – 3:37 / " Custer Jammin" – 4:15 (PWL PWS 004, 1989, withdrawn)

12"

- "Everybody Wants To Dance Like Josephine Baker" (12" Mix) – 6:45 / "Custer Jammin" – 4:15 / "Everybody Wants To Dance Like Josephine Baker" (PWL PWCS 004, 1989, withdrawn)

CD

- "Everybody Wants To Dance Like Josephine Baker" (12" Mix) – 6:45 / "Custer Jammin" – 4:15 / "Everybody Wants To Dance Like Josephine Baker" (PWL PWCS 004, 1989, withdrawn)

Netherlands
7"

- "Josephine Baker" (according to the label, cover says: "A Tribute To Josephine Baker" – 4:25 / Shame And Scandal – 3:51 (Music Productions BS 800 Stemra)
