= 6 Years of Boney M. Hits =

"6 Years of Boney M. Hits (Boney M. on 45)"

Single by Boney M.
- Released: January 1982
- Recorded: 1981
- Genre: Pop; Disco
- Label: Hansa (FRG)
- Producer: Frank Farian

Boney M. singles chronology
"Little Drummer Boy" / "6 Years of Boney M. Hits" (1981)	"6 Years of Boney M. Hits (Boney M. on 45)" (1982)	"The Carnival Is Over" / "Going Back West" (1982)

Audio video
- "6 Years Of Boney M. Hits (Boney M. On 45)" on YouTube

"6 Years of Boney M. Hits (Boney M. on 45)" is a greatest hits medley by Boney M., inspired by the success of the hit medleys by Stars on 45. Originally released on the B-side of the band's 1981 Christmas single "Little Drummer Boy", the single was flipped over in January 1982 with the medley as an A-side. While failing to chart in Germany, the medley reached #6 in the Spanish charts and was also an A-side release in France and Japan. The 12" version featured a faded version on the German pressing and an unfaded version on the French pressing, while the UK version (included on the B-side of their UK top 40 hit "We Kill the World") was extended with their Christmas chart-topper "Mary's Boy Child – Oh My Lord".

== Track listing ==
+ indicates inclusion in 12" version only

- "Let It All Be Music" (W. S. van Vugt) +
- "Daddy Cool" (Farian, Reyam)
- "Ma Baker" (Farian, Reyam, Jay)
- "Belfast" (Drafi Deutscher, Menke, Billsbury)
- "Gotta Go Home" (Farian, Huth, Huth, Jay)
- "Love for Sale" (Porter) +
- "Painter Man" (Pickett, Phillips) +
- "Rasputin" (Farian, Reyam, Jay) +
- "Brown Girl in the Ring" (Farian)
- "Oceans of Fantasy" (Dietmar Kawohl, Didi Zill, Fred Jay) +
- "Hooray! Hooray! It's a Holi-Holiday" (Farian, Jay)
- "The Calendar Song (January, February, March)" (Farian)
- "Dancing in the Streets" (Farian) +
- "Bye Bye Bluebird" (Farian, Reyam, Jay) +
- "Baby Do You Wanna Bump" (Zambi)
- "Rivers of Babylon" (Farian, Reyam, Dowe, McNaughton)
- "Sunny" (Bobby Hebb)
- "Nightflight to Venus" (Farian, Kawohl, Jay) +
- "Mary's Boy Child / Oh My Lord" (Jester Hairston, Lorin, Farian, Jay) - UK 12" version only

== Releases ==
7" singles

- "6 Years of Boney M. Hits" / "Little Drummer Boy" (Hansa 103 777-100, Germany)
- "6 Years of Boney M. Hits" (1-sided record) (Hansa 103 953-000, Promo-only, Germany)
- "6 Years of Boney M. Hits" / "Rivers of Babylon" (Ariola B-103 782, Spain)
- "6 Years of Boney M. Hits" / "Sad Movies" (Atlantic P-1627, Japan)
- "6 Years of Boney M. Hits" / "Bye Bye Bluebird" - 4:17 (France)
- "Boney M. On 45" / "Strange" - 3:28 (Greece)

12" singles

- "We Kill the World (Don't Kill the World)" - 6:32 / "6 Years of Boney M. Hits" - 13:26 (Atlantic K11689T, UK)
- "6 Years of Boney M. Hits" - 11:13 / "Little Drummer Boy" (Hansa 600 479-213, Germany)
- "6 Years of Boney M. Hits" - 11:13 / "Rivers of Babylon" (Ariola B-600 539, Spain)
- "6 Years of Boney M. Hits" (unfaded) - 11:15 / "Bye Bye Bluebird" (edit) - 4:17 (Carrere, 8.153, France)

== Sources ==
- Rate Your Music entry
- Fantastic Boney M.
