= Bobby Farrell =

Aruban dancer and singer (1949–2010)

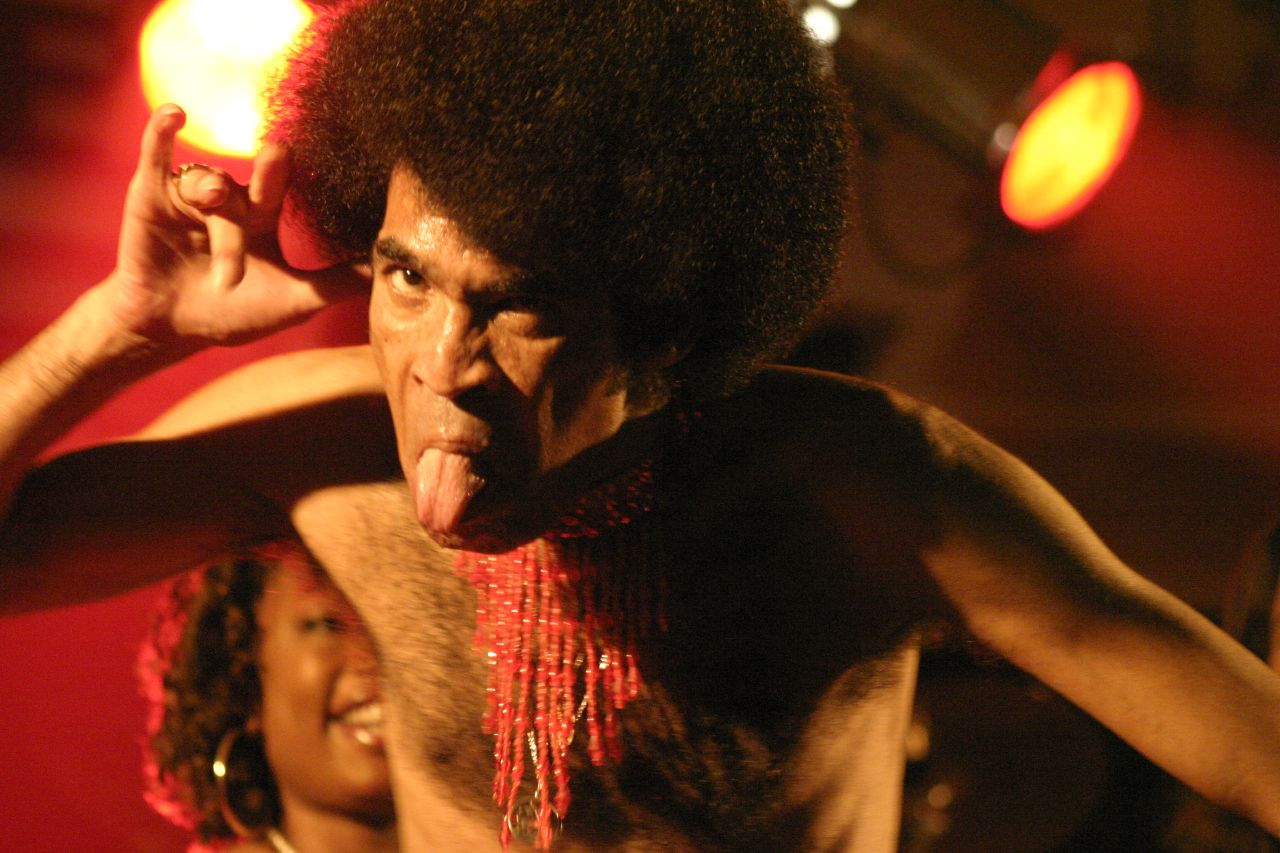
- Farrell performing with Boney M.
- Born: 6 October 1949; San Nicolaas, Aruba
- Died: 30 December 2010 (aged 61); Saint Petersburg, Russia
- Occupations: Dancer; singer; DJ
- Years active: 1975–2010
- Spouse: Jasmina Shaban (m. 1981; div. 1995)
- Children: 2
- Musical career
- Formerly of: Boney M.

Roberto Alfonso "Bobby" Farrell (6 October 1949 – 30 December 2010) was an Aruban dancer, singer and DJ. He was a member of the 1970s and 1980s disco group Boney M.

== Early life ==
Farrell was born and raised on the Caribbean island of Aruba, in the Dutch colony of Curaçao and Dependencies (later known as the Netherlands Antilles). He left after having finished school at the age of 15, and was a sailor for two years, before moving to Norway. He then went to the Netherlands, where he found occasional work as a DJ, before moving to Germany for better opportunities.

== Career ==
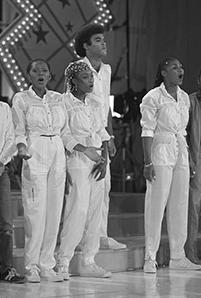
Farrell, 3rd from the left, performing with Boney M. in 1981

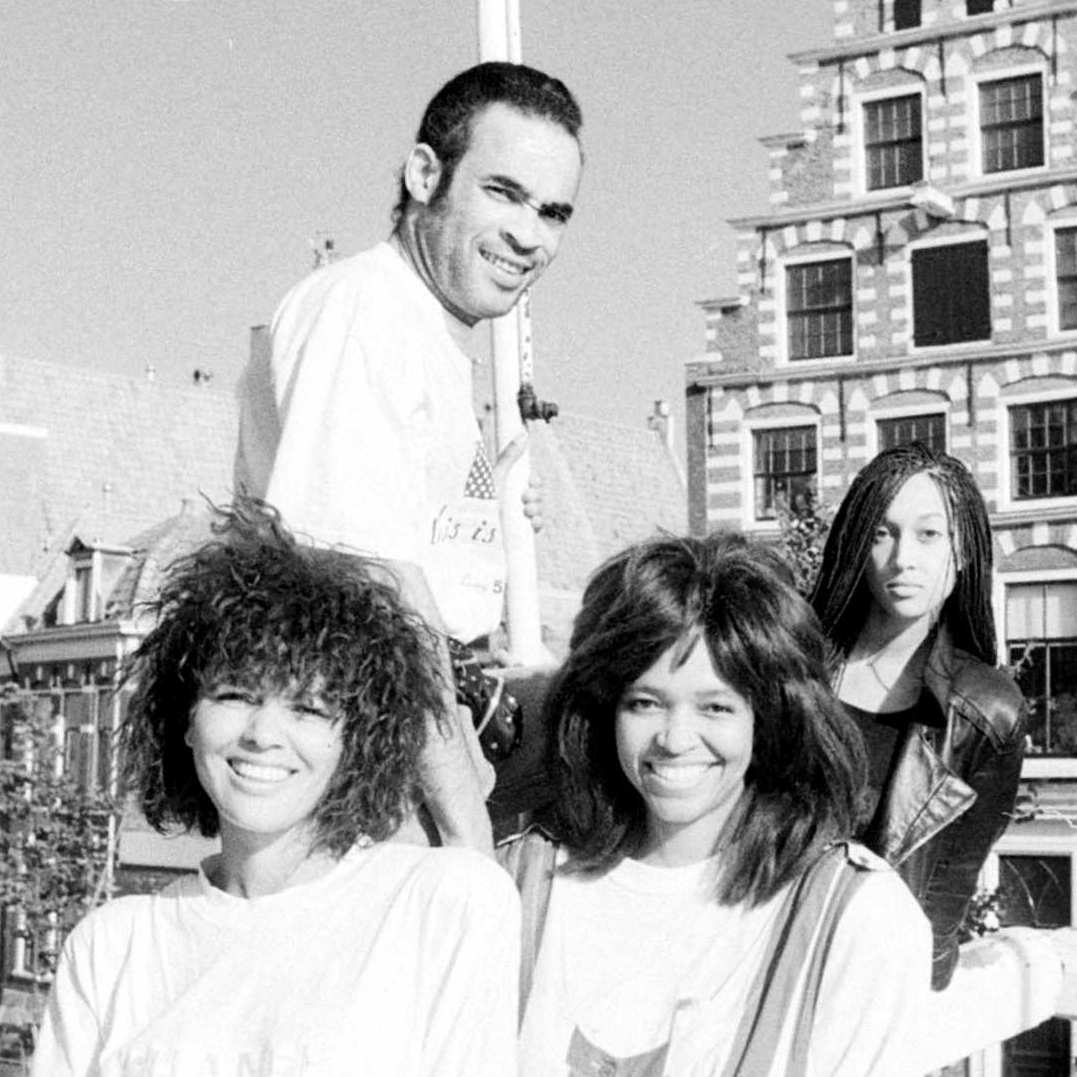
Bobby Farrell in 1991

In Germany, Farrell mostly worked as a DJ, until producer Frank Farian spotted him for his new group, Boney M., and made Farrell the lone male singer in the group. In 1978, however, Farian confirmed existing rumours that Farrell made no vocal contributions to the group's records, and Farian had performed the male parts in the studio. Liz Mitchell said this was true; only she, Marcia Barrett and Farian had sung on the hit recordings, adding that Farrell limited himself vocally to "growling" when performing live in some of the various incarnations of Boney M., including the main 1970s incarnation. After Farrell left the group in 1981, due to clashes with Farian, his voice was genuinely recorded for the first time on the double A-side single "We Kill the World" / "Boonoonoonoos". He was replaced by Reggie Tsiboe, while Farrell attempted a solo career; however, he rejoined in 1984, and continued as a member until the final split in 1986.

In 1988, Farrell and the three original female members reunited. Two remix albums were released, and they performed on several television shows; in France, one of their singles reached no. 1. Despite this, the reunion did not last more than a year. Soon after, Farrell started to tour with his own group, performing the band's hits under the name Bobby Farrell's Boney M.

He appeared as a dancer in the late 2005 Roger Sanchez music video for "Turn on the Music".

== Later life ==
Farrell lived for many years in Amsterdam, in the neighbourhood of Gaasperdam in the borough of Amsterdam-Zuidoost.

In 1981, he married Macedonian Romani Jasmina Shaban. They had a daughter, who is a musician herself, and a son. They separated in 1995.

== Death ==
Farrell died on the morning of 30 December 2010, in a hotel room in Saint Petersburg, Russia, of heart failure. His agent, John Seine, said Farrell had complained of breathing problems and of pain in his chest, which intensified after he performed with his band the prior evening. Despite his still present dynamism, he had experienced health problems for a decade. Farrell's body was discovered by hotel staff after he failed to respond to a wake-up call. By coincidence, he died 94 years to the day and in the same city as Grigori Rasputin, the subject of one of his group's most iconic songs, and whom he had dressed as in some live performances. Farrell was buried at Zorgvlied cemetery in Amsterdam.

== In popular culture ==
In series 6, episode 5 ("Demon 79") of Black Mirror, Paapa Essiedu portrayed Farrell through the character of Gaap, a demon who takes the likeness of Farrell as he appeared on stage in the group Boney M. during a performance of the song "Rasputin".

== Discography ==
=== Singles ===
- 1982: "Polizei" / "A Fool in Love"
- 1985: "King of Dancing" / "I See You"
- 1985: "Happy Song"
- 1987: "Hoppa Hoppa" / "Hoppa Hoppa" (instrumental)
- 1991: "Tribute to Josephine Baker"
- 2004: "Aruban Style" (Mixes) - S-Cream featuring Bobby Farrell
- 2006: The Bump EP
- 2010: "Bamboo Song" (Roundhouse Records)

=== Various compilations ===
(as "Bobby Farrell's Boney M." / as "Boney M. featuring Bobby Farrell" / "Bobby Farrell featuring Sandy Chambers")

- 2000: The Best of Boney M. (DVMore)
- 2001: Boney M. – I Successi (DVMore)
- 2001: The Best of Boney M. (II)
- 2001: The Best of Boney M. (III)
- 2005: Boney M. – Remix 2005 (featuring Sandy Chambers) (Crisler)
- 2007: Boney M. – Disco Collection

Note: these releases contain re-recordings of Boney M.'s hits, not the original versions.
