= Marcia Barrett =

British singer (born 1948)

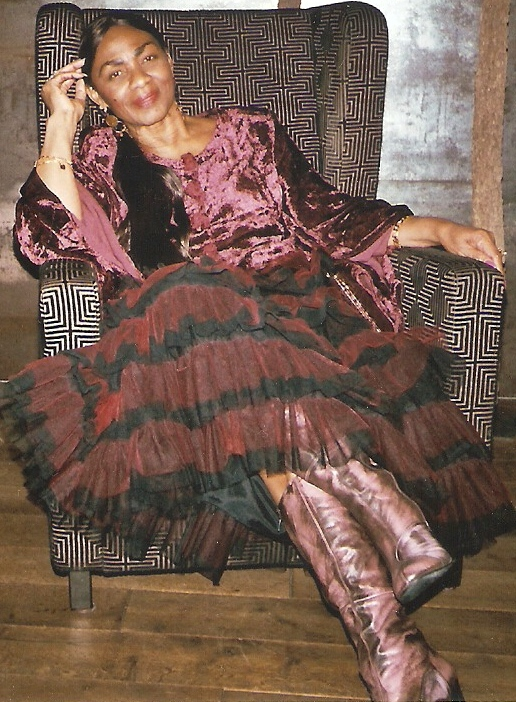
- Barrett in 2014

Background information
- Born: 14 October 1948 (age 77); Saint Catherine Parish, British Jamaica
- Origin: London, England
- Genres: R&B; eurodisco; reggae
- Occupation: Singer
- Instrument: Vocals
- Years active: 1970–present
- Labels: Hansa; Sony-BMG; BSC
- Formerly of: Boney M.
- Website: Official website

Marcia Barrett (born 14 October 1948) is a British singer and one of the original singers with the vocal group Boney M.

== Early years ==
Barrett was born in Saint Catherine Parish, British Jamaica. Her family later emigrated to Croydon, England. In the late 1960s she moved to Germany, where she joined a band and toured with Karel Gott and Rex Gildo. In 1971 she signed to Metronome Records and made her first record, "Could Be Love", written by Joe Menke and Frank Valdor. At the same time, she kept touring, with such songs as "Son of a Preacher Man", "Oh Happy Day" and "Big Spender".

== Boney M. early era ==
In 1975, she joined Boney M., a group of models and dancers, to make discothèque and television performances of "Baby Do You Wanna Bump", a song recorded by record producer Frank Farian. The single was sold in the Benelux countries. When singer Claudja Barry left in early 1976, Barrett suggested a fellow Jamaican, Liz Mitchell, as replacement. Mitchell was a singer, and Farian engaged her and Barrett to make a follow-up recording, "Daddy Cool". They recorded Boney M.'s first album, Take the Heat Off Me, in 1976. After an appearance on the German television programme Musikladen in September, the group was in the charts all over Europe, and a series of hit singles and albums followed over the next decade. Boney M. counted four official members, but only Barrett and Mitchell were in the recording studio when Boney M.'s records were recorded. Frank Farian (and, from 1982–85, Reggie Tsiboe) provided male vocals that dancer and live on tour singer Bobby Farrell mimed on TV.

While Mitchell was the lead singer, Barrett contributed harmony on many the group's songs and shared the lead with Mitchell on the hits "Daddy Cool", "Ma Baker", "Rasputin" and "Gotta Go Home". She also led on a couple of tracks on each of the group's studio albums up to Christmas Album (1981), including the title of the first album Take the Heat off Me and "Lovin' or Leavin'". These were released as a Barrett solo single in 1977. She sang lead vocals on "Belfast", a song she had performed live in her solo years, which became the second single from the second album Love for Sale; it was a German no. 1 and a European Top 10 hit. On that album, she also performed "Silent Lover".

On Nightflight to Venus, Barrett sang "Nightflight To Venus" and a cover of "King of the Road" as well as the original "Never Change Lovers in the Middle of the Night", which became a standard during the group's performances. She sang the a capella intros of Boney M.'s 1978 Christmas hit, "Mary's Boy Child/Oh My Lord", and "Ribbons of Blue", was lead singer of "No Time to Lose" on the group's 1979 album Oceans of Fantasy and had a solo on the opening track "Let It All Be Music".

After an unsuccessful solo single, "You", in the late 1980s, written by Kelvin James, she abandoned her solo project. Farian took one of the songs written by James for her, "Breakaway", and used it on Boney M.'s next album Boonoonoonoos, with his own vocals on verses. Barrett, however, sang the lead on the single "We Kill the World (Don't Kill the World)" in 1981. Although only a modest hit in the UK (reaching no. 39), it topped the charts in Spain and South Africa. The group became less popular from 1982 onwards, when Bobby Farrell was replaced by Reggie Tsiboe.

In 1983, Barrett was introduced to Eddy Grant, who produced demos with her for CBS. However, Farian reminded her she was still contractually committed to Boney M. On their seventh album, Ten Thousand Lightyears, she is on backing vocals. After Mitchell's departure during the 1989 tour, Madeleine Davis joined the group. When Farian announced he would not be making any new recordings, the group went to France to record "Everybody Wants to Dance Like Josephine Baker" with producer Barry Blue. Barrett did all lead and backing vocals on the A-side, but Farian withdrew the single, angry that the group had used the name Boney M. After a court case in 1990, the group members went their separate ways. Barrett was never involved in any of the Boney M. projects and recordings throughout the following decades.

== Life after Boney M. ==
"Life after Boney M. – my dear, I've been through hell and back", Barrett said in a radio interview in November 2001. After the group split in 1990, Barrett was recording rock tracks in Munich when she was diagnosed with ovarian cancer. She had a recurrence of her disease and was unable to work.

By 1997, she had begun working with producer Scott Christina on dance tracks. The resulting album, Survival, appeared in November 1999. Two new tracks, a solo of Boney M.'s no. 1 hit "Rivers of Babylon" and a new track called "Seasons" were played on a small Dutch radio show, but neither track was released. In 2003, a benefit EP No War! Peace and Love was released as a protest against the US military intervention in Iraq, and generated $295 for the War Child charity.

== Present day ==
Barrett made her second album, Come into My Life, in 2005. It included a cover of "Hey Joe", a new version of "Belfast", as well as original recordings written by her and her husband Marcus. In addition, a cover of Fleetwood Mac's instrumental "Albatross", for which Barrett had been allowed to add her own lyrics by its composer Peter Green, and the song "Rip It Up", were also part of the track listing.

Barrett also toured with her own version of Boney M. She attended, with Liz Mitchell and Frank Farian, the London and Berlin premières of the Daddy Cool musical. In October 2007, Barrett turned down a song for the album Disco 2008, a project by UK music producer Ian Levine. In October, she and her Boney M. were invited by President Mikhail Saakashvili to perform in South Ossetia.

In 2009, she started Xoah Records. The first release on the label was a remix of her Survival track, "Seeing Is Believing", released on 6 March 2009, followed by "I Don't Know Why". While her third solo album Strange Rumours had been announced to follow, the album was put on hold when she was hit by another bout of cancer.

Barrett's biography, Forward - My Life With and Without Boney M. was published in June 2018. A German edition of her biography was also published, with the title Immer weiter: Mein Leben mit und ohne Boney M.
