= Boney M. =

German disco group

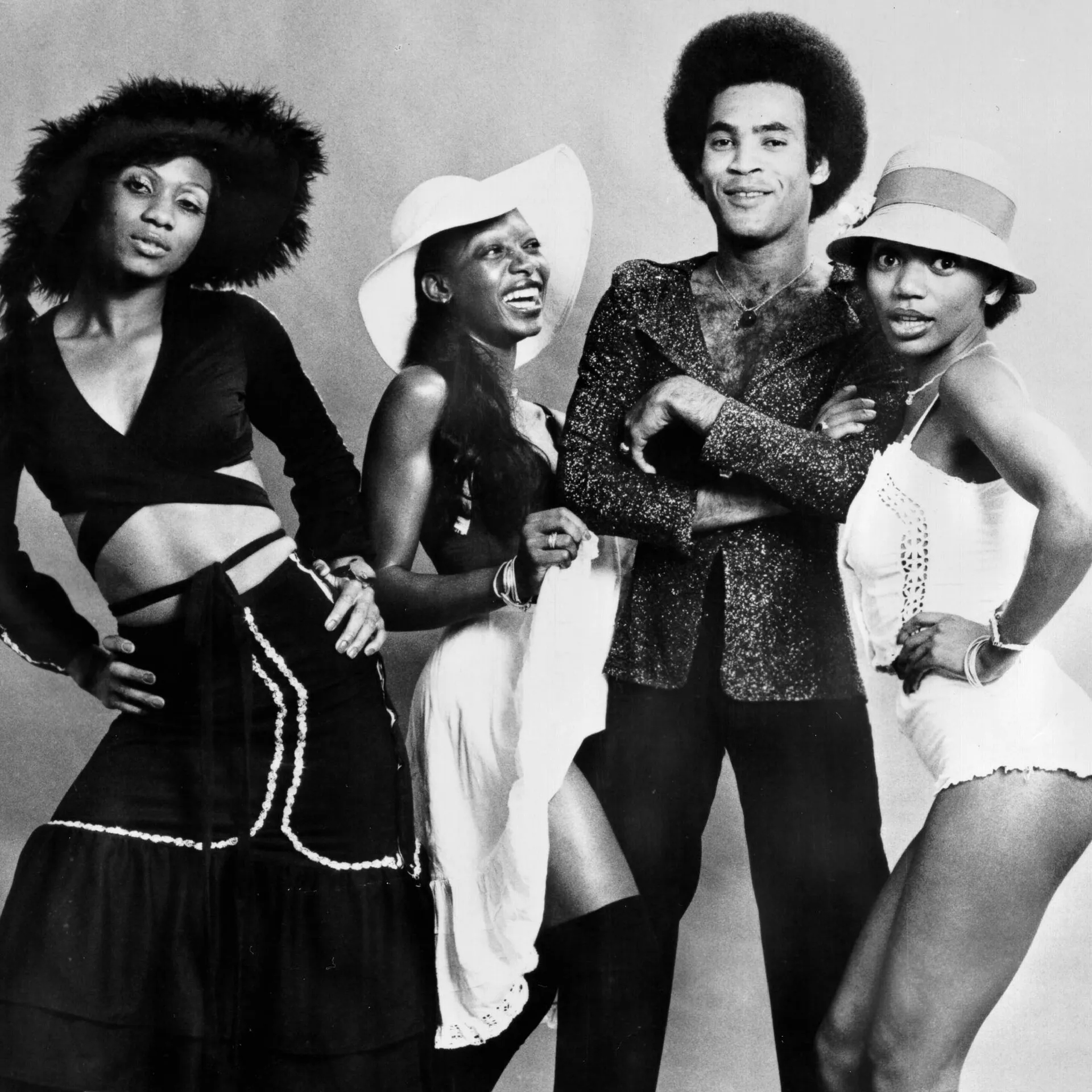
- Boney M. in 1976. From L-R: Marcia Barrett, Maizie Williams, Bobby Farrell, Liz Mitchell

Background information
- Origin: West Germany
- Genres: R&B; disco; reggae
- Years active: 1974–1986; 1988–1989; 1992–present
- Labels: Hansa; Atlantic; Sony
- Members: Liz Mitchell
- Past members: Marcia Barrett; Maizie Williams; Bobby Farrell; Reggie Tsiboe
- Logo

Boney M. are a reggae, funk and disco music group founded in 1974 in West Germany. They achieved popularity during the disco era in the second half of the 1970s. The band were created by German record producer Frank Farian, who was the group's primary songwriter and one of its main vocalists. Originally based in West Germany, the four original members of the band's official line-up were Liz Mitchell and Marcia Barrett from Jamaica, Maizie Williams from Montserrat, and Bobby Farrell from Aruba. Since the 1980s, various line-ups of the band have performed with different members.

The band sold over 100 million records during their commercial heyday, and are known for hits including "Daddy Cool", "Ma Baker", "Belfast", "Sunny", "Rasputin", "Rivers of Babylon", "Brown Girl in the Ring", "Hooray! Hooray! It's a Holi-Holiday", "Mary's Boy Child / Oh My Lord" and "Gotta Go Home". They achieved eight number one singles in their native Germany, and two in the United Kingdom, both of which are among that country's all-time bestsellers.

== History ==
=== 1974–1976: Formation and early career ===
German singer-songwriter Frank Farian recorded the dance track "Baby Do You Wanna Bump" in 1974. Farian sang the repeated line "Do you do you wanna bump?" in a deep voice and the falsetto chorus. When the record was released as a single in early 1975, it was credited to "Boney M.". Farian created this pseudonym for himself after watching the Australian television detective series Boney, whose main character was named Napoleon Bonaparte. Farian said:

I turned on the TV one day and it was the end of a detective series. I just caught the credits and it said Boney. Nice name, I thought – Boney, Boney, Boney... Boney M. Boney, Boney, Boney M. Nice sound. Simple.

After a slow start, the song became a hit in the Netherlands and Belgium. Farian decided to hire performers to create a troupe for TV appearances.

In 1975, model-turned-singer Maizie Williams (originally from Montserrat) and her friend Sheyla Bonnick were approached by an agent while at a restaurant in Hanover, Germany, and invited to join a new pop group. The job was to dance and mime to the studio recording of "Baby Do You Wanna Bump". Williams and Bonnick were joined by two other performers identified only as "Nathalie" and "Mike", and together the four embarked on a discothèque tour and made a few television appearances in the subsequent months. No footage of this early lineup of Boney M. has surfaced. Nathalie left the group and was replaced by Claudja Barry. Bonnick decided that lip-synching was not for her and departed with the aim of pursuing a solo career, and Mike also left. They were replaced by Marcia Barrett, a singer from Jamaica, and Bobby Farrell, a dancer from Aruba. When Barry also left, Barrett brought in Liz Mitchell, also from Jamaica and formerly a member of the Les Humphries Singers, and the group's classic lineup was complete.

=== 1976–1979: Take the Heat off Me and international success ===
Boney M.'s first album, Take the Heat off Me, was released in 1976. It featured tracks that Marcia Barrett had already recorded with Farian, including the title track and "Lovin' or Leavin'", both of which were previously recorded in German by another Farian act, Gilla. As Maizie Williams' voice was not considered suitable for recording purposes by Farian, and a try-out with Bobby Farrell performing "No Woman No Cry" did not work, Farian decided to use only Liz Mitchell and Marcia Barrett, along with his own studio-enhanced voice, to create the Boney M. sound.

The album's commercial performance was initially lukewarm. However, the group rigorously toured discos, clubs, and even country fairs to earn a reputation for themselves. The group's big break came at the end of the summer of 1976 when West German television producer Michael "Mike" Leckebusch of Radio Bremen requested them for his show Musikladen. Boney M. appeared on the live music show on 18 September 1976, after 10:00 p.m. and in their daring stage costumes, where they performed the song "Daddy Cool". The song quickly went to no.1 in West Germany, with the album following the success of the single. Another single, "Sunny", a cover of the 1966 Bobby Hebb song, gave the group their second no.1 hit. The group's popularity had also grown throughout Europe, with "Daddy Cool" reaching no.1 in Switzerland, Sweden, Norway, Spain, France, and Austria. Both singles were also Top 10 hits in the UK, which would become one of their biggest markets.

In 1977, Boney M. released their second album, Love for Sale, which contained the hits "Ma Baker" and "Belfast". The group embarked on their first major concert tours with a live band of musicians called The Black Beauty Circus, given their name after Maizie Williams' first band, Black Beautiful People. Love for Sale was certified Gold a year after its release in the UK. Both singles from the album reached no.1 in West Germany and the UK Top 10.

1978 was the group's biggest year. They released a new double A-sided single, "Rivers of Babylon" / "Brown Girl in the Ring", which was a hit all over Europe, reaching no.1 in several countries as well as becoming one of the biggest selling singles of all time in the UK. It also became their most successful single in the United States, peaking at no.30 on the U.S. pop singles chart. Following this came their biggest-selling album, Nightflight to Venus, which spawned further hit singles with "Rasputin" and "Painter Man". Continuing with their success, they released "Mary's Boy Child / Oh My Lord", which was the 1978 Christmas number one single in the United Kingdom and became another of the biggest selling singles of all time there. The same year, Boney M. made a much-publicised promotional visit to the Soviet Union, one of the very few Western acts (along with Elton John) to do so, although tracks like "Rasputin" were not released in the Soviet Union due to their subject matter.

While it had never been a secret that Bobby Farrell never sang on the group's records (Farian did the male vocals in the studio), in 1978 it became public knowledge that Maizie Williams did not sing on the studio recordings either, since "her voice wasn't suited for this kind of music" as Farian stated in an interview with German teen magazine Bravo. Because this had become common practice within the disco genre of the late 1970s, few people cared— unlike when Farian repeated the practice to much more severe backlash with Milli Vanilli in the late 1980s. While only two of Boney M.'s official members actually contributed to the sound of the band's records, all four members of the group, including Williams and Farrell, performed the vocals live at Boney M. concerts. The band's live sound was also augmented by several backing vocalists, which served to mitigate any vocal deficiencies the group may have had compared with the studio productions.

1979 saw Boney M. release a brand new single, "Hooray! Hooray! It's a Holi-Holiday", which became another Top 10 hit across Europe. Later in the year they released their fourth album, Oceans of Fantasy, featuring two hit singles – "Gotta Go Home" / "El Lute" and "I'm Born Again" / "Bahama Mama". The album also included lead and backing vocals credits for the first time. Oceans of Fantasy reached no.1 in the UK and was certified Platinum, though their run of Top 10 singles had now ended, with "Gotta Go Home" peaking at no.12 and "I'm Born Again" peaking at no.35.

=== 1980–1986: The Magic of Boney M.; departure of Farrell and split ===
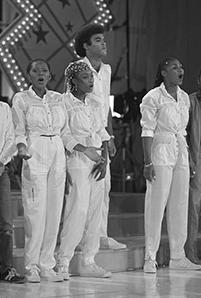
Boney M. in 1981

In 1980, Boney M. released a greatest hits album, The Magic of Boney M. – 20 Golden Hits, which also featured two new songs, "My Friend Jack" and "I See a Boat on the River". It made the no.1 spot in the UK, reaching Gold status within six weeks of release, though it was their last big-selling album in the UK.

Boney M.'s fifth album had been scheduled for release in November 1980, but the recording sessions dragged on through 1981. When Boonoonoonoos was finally released by the end of that year, Bobby Farrell left the group, having had issues with Frank Farian. While still a healthy seller in continental Europe, Boonoonoonoos failed to crack the UK Top 100 after three consecutive no.1 albums, due to the group being unable to promote it without Farrell. Following this, the group released Christmas Album.

In 1982, "Rasputin" was played by local broadcasters in Vietnam during the waiting periods before live games of the España 82 – the 1982 FIFA World Cup. This led to the popularity of the band in Vietnam for decades following.

Reggie Tsiboe was hired to replace Farrell as the new male member of Boney M. in 1982, but the singles "The Carnival is Over" and "Jambo" fared poorly, and the group's seventh album Ten Thousand Lightyears, issued in 1984, marked another commercial low point, peaking at number 23 in the German album charts. However, they returned to the German Top 20 in the autumn of 1984 with "Kalimba de Luna" (a Top 10 hit in France) and "Happy Song", the latter seeing Farrell return to the group. Both songs were carbon-copies of the original Italian hits by Tony Esposito and Baby's Gang respectively.

By 1985, Farian clearly began losing interest in the group, and their eighth and final studio album Eye Dance was widely regarded as uninspired and disappointing. After celebrating Boney M.'s 10th anniversary in early 1986, the group officially disbanded after the release of the commercially unsuccessful single "Young, Free and Single", which peaked at no. 48 in West Germany.

=== 1990–present: Failed reunions and public interest ===
From this point, different versions of the group were formed by members, some with the cooperation of Farian, others without, for example by independently obtaining the rights to use the Boney M. name in a different country. One version began touring in the first half of 1987 with Marilyn Scharbaai (Carrilho) taking Liz Mitchell's place. Mitchell returned for a second leg of the tour late 1987, and Marcia Barrett soon left the band. At the same time, Bobby Farrell had set up a deal for a new Boney M. album to be recorded without Farian in Belgium. When Farrell failed to show up for either recording or tour, and as Maizie Williams had never sung on record, the album ended up being released as Liz Mitchell's first solo album, No One Will Force You. Mitchell and Williams completed a tour during 1987–88, adding singer Celena Duncan and Ron Gale as replacements for Barrett and Farrell. Carol Grey later replaced Celena Duncan and Curt De Daran later replaced Ron Gale.

In October 1988, the classic Boney M. line-up reunited without producer Frank Farian for the album Greatest Hits of All Times – Remix '88, but tensions ran high between the members, and Mitchell left in the spring of 1989, to be replaced by Madeleine Davis. While Mitchell promoted her solo album, the group recorded the single "Everybody Wants to Dance Like Josephine Baker", without Farian's knowledge or approval. Threatened with legal action by the producer over the use of the Boney M. name, the single was subsequently withdrawn and Farian issued "Stories" with his own new Boney M. line-up featuring Mitchell, Reggie Tsiboe and two new members, Sharon Stevens and Patty Onoyewenjo. "Stories" peaked at number 11 in the Swiss charts, and a second remix album, Greatest Hits of All Times – Remix '89 – Volume II, was released, but fared poorly.

1992 saw a renewed interest in Boney M.'s music with the "Boney M. Megamix" single returning the group to the UK Top 10 for the first time since 1980, and a subsequent greatest hits album, Gold – 20 Super Hits, reaching the UK Top 20 in 1993. While Marcia Barrett, by then living in Florida, had cancer and was unable to perform, Boney M. toured the world with a line-up of Liz Mitchell, Carol Grey, Patricia Lorna Foster and Curt Dee Daran (replaced by Tony Ashcroft in 1994). They released the single "Papa Chico", but it failed to chart. Maizie Williams assembled her own Boney M., with an ever-changing line-up. Bobby Farrell also toured with varying trios of female performers.

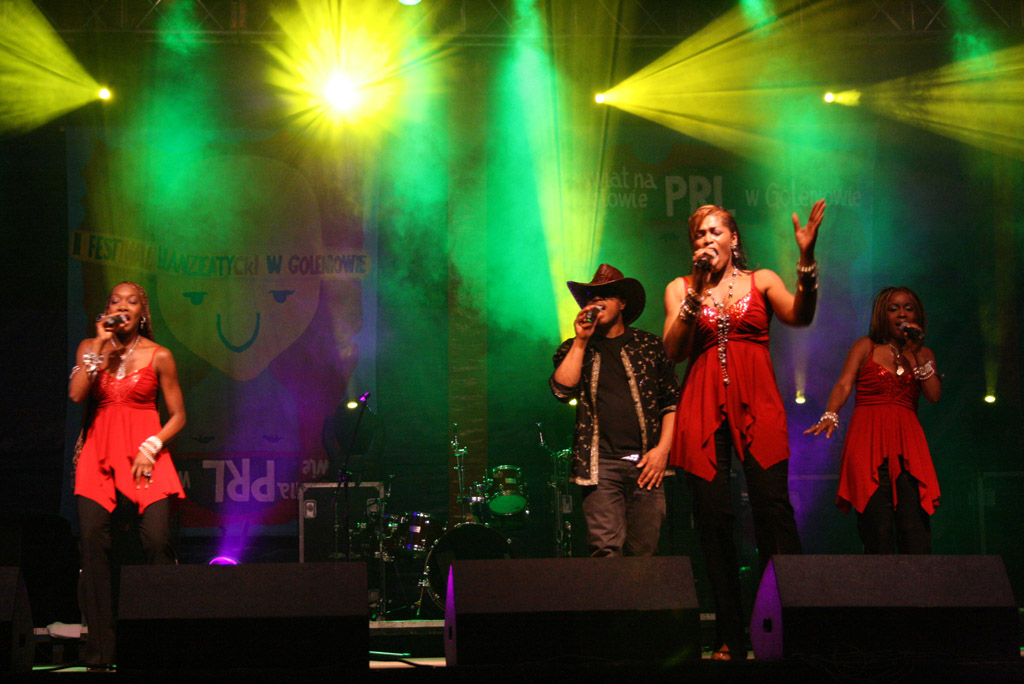
Boney M. featuring Maizie Williams performing at a concert

Mitchell was touring the world with her line-up of Boney M., which was the only line-up officially supported by Farian; a court ruling in 1990 stated that all four members were entitled to perform their own Boney M. shows. Farrell and Mitchell have released solo albums featuring their own re-recordings of Boney M.'s classic hits. Williams released her first solo album in 2006, and her own single version of "Sunny". In 2007, her rendition of "Daddy Cool" with Melo-M hit the number one spot in the Latvian (LMK) Charts. Marcia Barrett has released two solo albums, with a third scheduled for release in 2010.

A musical based on the music of Boney M., Daddy Cool, opened in London in August 2006 to mixed reviews and sluggish ticket sales, causing it to close in February 2007. From April to July 2007, the show played in a mobile theatre in Berlin, which was specially designed for it.

In April 2007, Australian pop singer Peter Wilson released a song co-written by Frank Farian entitled "Doin' Fine". It was described as "paying tribute to the sound of Boney M." and features the famous string arrangement from their first number 1 hit, "Daddy Cool". Boney M. (featuring Marcia Barrett) made a live appearance at the 37th International Film Festival of India (IFFI), which took place on 23 November 2006 in Panaji, the state capital of Goa, India.

In the UK, a new album of their greatest hits, entitled The Magic of Boney M. was released via BMG on 27 November 2006. Special additions to this release were a Mousse T. remix of "Sunny" and a brand new song from 2006, featuring Liz Mitchell, entitled "A Moment of Love". On 10 April 2007, Boney M.'s first four albums were reissued on compact disc with bonus tracks, this time also in the United States (the first time these were available to the U.S. music market since their original releases in the 1970s).

In September 2007, Boney M.'s last four original albums, Boonoonoonoos, Ten Thousand Lightyears, Kalimba de Luna - 16 Happy Songs and Eye Dance were reissued on compact disc in Europe and the United States, all including bonus tracks. In November 2007, a new Christmas compilation was scheduled for release, as well as the DVD Fantastic Boney M. – On Stage and on the Road, featuring a live performance recorded in Vienna on 1 November 1977 (the DVD cover erroneously states it to be a live show from Hamburg), and a film from the band's 1981 visit to Jamaica (made to promote the Boonoonoonoos album that year).

Bobby Farrell's Boney M. performed a concert at the Amphi in Ra'anana, Israel, in May 2007. On 28 June 2007 Boney M. featuring Matthew Felsenfeld and Liz Mitchell performed at the Oktiabrsky concert hall in St. Petersburg, Russia. In September 2007, Maizie Williams' Boney M. line-up performed live at the Royal Albert Hall in London to raise awareness of HIV/AIDS in Africa, performing her own renditions of "Brown Girl in the Ring" and "Hooray! Hooray! It's a Holi-Holiday".

The legal rights to the name "Boney M." have been a matter of controversy, and even court cases, between the former members of the band and producer Frank Farian ever since the late 1980s. Farian, the man who in effect created the group, continued to work with Liz Mitchell and her line-up all through the 1990s and 2000s. In January 2007, Bobby Farrell's daughter Zanillya Farrell and his ex-wife Yasmina Ayad-Saban renewed the trademark to the name Boney M. in Germany for a 10-year period.

In January 2009, Farian released the single "Felicidad America (Obama Obama)", a version of the 1980 Boney M. song "Felicidad (Margherita)" with new lyrics about newly elected U.S. president Barack Obama. The song was recorded with two new vocalists, and credited to "Boney M. feat. Sherita O. & Yulee B."

In July 2010, Maizie Williams headlined a Boney M. performance at Ramallah's Cultural Palace, in the West Bank, as part of the Palestine International Festival. The band played "Daddy Cool", "Ma Baker" and "Brown Girl in the Ring", but refrained from playing "Rivers of Babylon", rumoured to be at the event organisers' request because of its description of the Jewish yearning for Zion.

Bobby Farrell died at the age of 61 from heart failure on 30 December 2010. His agent said Farrell was complaining of breathing problems after performing with his band the evening before. Farrell lived in Amsterdam until his death. His final performance was in Saint Petersburg, Russia, the city where Rasputin first became famous and was later killed. Farrell died in a hotel room there, 94 years to the day after Rasputin.

Maizie Williams' line-up of Boney M. toured Australia in June 2014. They sang at Guilfest, Guildford, UK, on 20 July 2014, and Watchet Live music festival UK, on 24 August 2014.

In March 2015, Farian released Diamonds, a three-CD box celebrating the 40th anniversary of Boney M. It featured re-mastered versions of the original hit singles or of previously unreleased versions, a remix disc and the new digital single "Song of Joy", featuring Liz Mitchell. A major DVD set was also released.

In February 2017, the group performed at the closing ceremony of Patras Carnival in Patras, Greece. At the end of 2017, the album World Music for Christmas was released under the name Boney M. and Friends, with Mitchell singing on three songs, along with the single and video "Like Diamonds in the Sky" featuring Mitchell, based on the song "El Cóndor Pasa".

In 2021, a remix of "Rasputin" by house music producer and Kiss FM DJ Kevin Christie was released by Sony Music's Ministry of Sound label. Credited to Majestic & Boney M (with the former being the DJ alias of Christie), the record reached number 11 on the UK singles chart and was released with a video featuring Bimini Bon-Boulash from RuPaul's Drag Race UK. In December 2021, Mitchell was one of the contributors to the Channel 5 music programme Britain's Biggest 70s Hits, alongside other musicians from the era such as Dean Friedman and Barry Blue, and radio presenters like David Hamilton.

In August 2023, Boney M., headed by Mitchell, embarked on a multi-city US tour, along with Samantha Fox and Bad Boys Blue, which included stops in Boston, Los Angeles, Chicago, New York City and San Jose. The shows were put together by Los Angeles-based promoters LA Concert Group.

In January 2024, the group's producer and main founder Frank Farian died, aged 82.

The group were scheduled for a farewell tour in Australia in June and July 2024.

== UK record sales achievements ==
In 1978, "Rivers of Babylon", a cover of a track by The Melodians with lyrics partly based on Psalm 137 and partly on Psalm 19, became (at the time) the second highest-selling single of all time in the UK. After remaining at no.1 for five weeks, "Rivers of Babylon" began dropping down the chart, at which point the B-side "Brown Girl in the Ring" was given extensive radio airplay, and the single ascended to no.2. The single spent six months in the UK Top 40, including 19 weeks in the Top 10. It eventually sold more than two million copies, the second single to do so, and is still one of only seven to achieve this feat.

The group achieved a second UK million-seller with their version of the calypso song "Mary's Boy Child", released as a medley, "Mary's Boy Child / Oh My Lord", the first title having previously been a million-seller for Harry Belafonte. The single sold more than 1.8 million copies, 1.6 million of which were in the four weeks the song was at No. 1 in December 1978.

Boney M. are only artist to appear twice in the top 12 best selling singles of all time in the UK, with "Rivers of Babylon" in seventh place and "Mary's Boy Child / Oh My Lord" at number 11. They are also one of six artists to sell a million copies with two singles in the same year.

== Back catalogue ==
Compared to other best-selling artists of the 1970s, like ABBA, Donna Summer, and the Bee Gees, the Boney M. discography is quite unusual, in that while the greater part of the band's back catalogue has been remixed, remade, remodeled and reissued all through the 1980s, 1990s and 2000s by producer Frank Farian and record company BMG-Ariola (now Sony Music), most of the original 7" and 12" versions issued on vinyl in the 1970s and early 1980s remained unavailable on CD until 2007, when they were released on various compilations, most notably The Collection (2008), the Ultimate Boney M. series (2008), Let It All Be Music: The Party Album (2009), Hit Story (2010) and Diamonds (2015). Some of these CDs were compiled by Frank Eberlein, who had also been interviewed on a fansite called "Fantastic Boney M." about the compiling process.

"Greatest hits" collections containing edited and/or overdubbed versions of the original recordings are still being released, such as Boney M. & Friends (Their Ultimate Top 40 Collection) (2017), Rasputin – Big And Strong: The Greatest Hits of Boney M. (2021) and the 2022 re-issue of the 2006 compilation The Magic of Boney M.

== Popularity outside the West ==
Boney M. were hugely popular in the Soviet Union in the 1970s, although the song "Rasputin" was banned by the Soviet authorities from being played at the group's concert in Moscow in December 1978. The song has been used in several films and television shows, including Johnny English Strikes Again, The King's Man, Black Mirror, the Brazilian telenovela Dancin' Days and in the Doctor Who special The Power of the Doctor, in which The Master dances to the song while disguised as Rasputin himself.

In the Soviet film Repentance (1984, released 1987), "Sunny" is played at a party attended by high-ranked communist officials. The song is also played during a few parts of the successful Korean film of the same name, Sunny.

During the 2002 presidential election campaign of South Korea, then-candidate Roh Moo-hyun, who eventually won the presidency at that event, used "Bahama Mama" to promote his aim of positive political reform.

The 2005 Chinese film Shanghai Dreams features a scene depicting a rural Chinese disco in 1983, with teenagers dancing to "Rivers of Babylon" and "Gotta Go Home".

In the 2008 Kazakh film Tulpan, the tractor driver Boni continually plays a cassette of "Rivers of Babylon", an example of his fascination for all things Western.

In the 2008 Chinese film Cheung Gong 7 hou (English title: CJ7), "Sunny" is a vital part of the soundtrack. "Sunny" is the theme song of the 2011 Taiwanese drama, Sunny Girl. The song has also appeared in The Umbrella Academy and Boogie Nights.

Boney M. were immensely popular in India throughout the 1970s and 1980s. Liz Mitchell recalled her visits to India in the 1980s in a 2015 interview with the Hindustan Times: "It was amazing. We've had the most-wonderful tours here. We even went out shopping to so many places. We met several Bollywood stars and had dinners with them."

== Personnel ==
- Liz Mitchell – lead and backing vocals (1976–1986, 1988–1989, 1990, 1992–present)
- Marcia Barrett – lead and backing vocals (1975–1986, 1988–1989)
- Maizie Williams – dancer, live vocals (1975–1986, 1988–1989)
- Bobby Farrell – dancer, live vocals (1975–1981, 1984–1986, 1988–1989; died 2010)
- Reggie Tsiboe – lead and backing vocals (1982–1986, 1990)

== Discography ==
Albums

- Take the Heat off Me (1976)
- Love for Sale (1977)
- Nightflight to Venus (1978)
- Oceans of Fantasy (1979)
- Boonoonoonoos (1981)
- Christmas Album (1981)
- Ten Thousand Lightyears (1984)
- Eye Dance (1985)
