= Liz Mitchell =

British singer (born 1952)

Liz Mitchell MBE
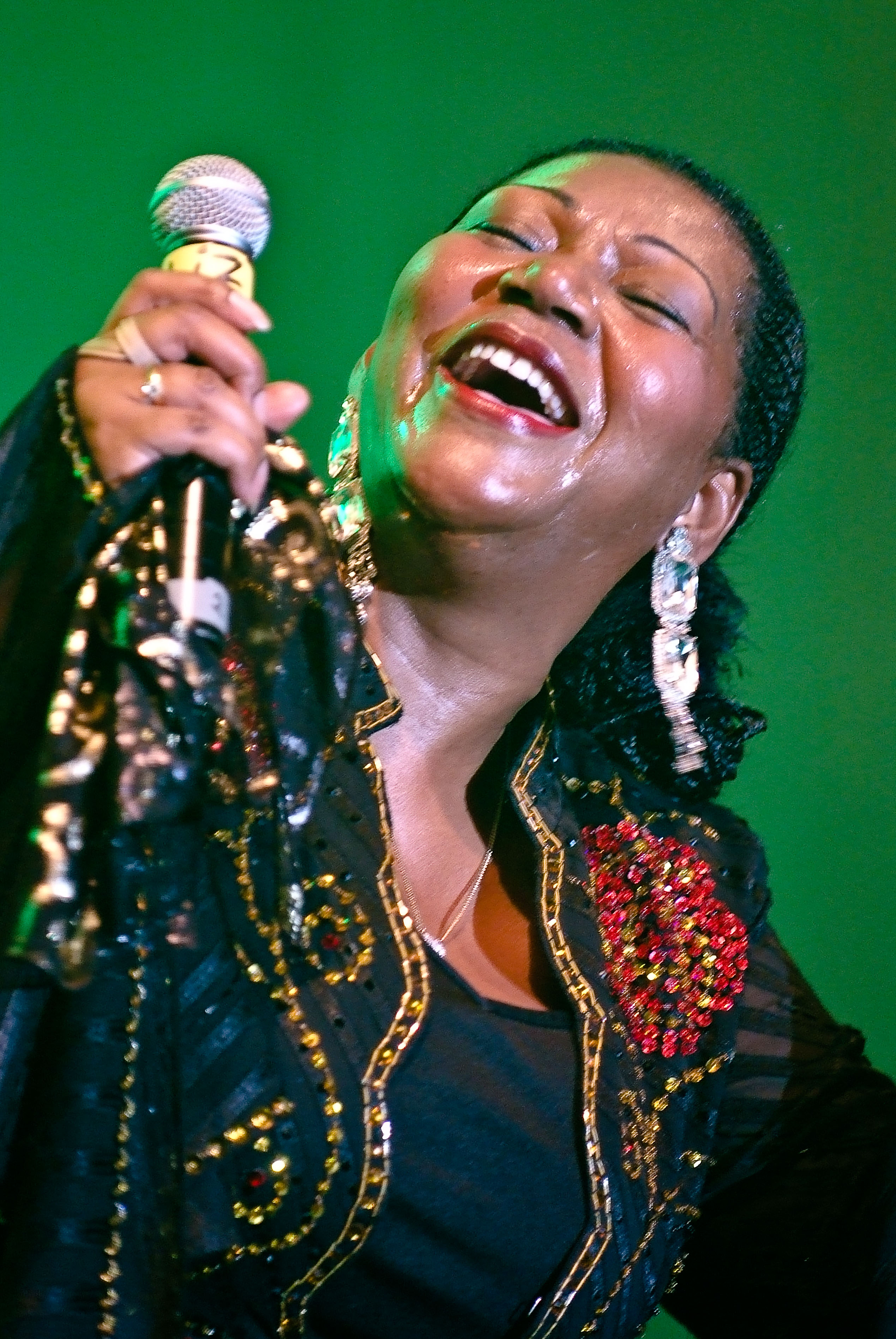
- Mitchell performing in 2009

Background information
- Born: Elizabeth Rebecca Mitchell; 12 July 1952 (age 74); Clarendon Parish, Colony of Jamaica
- Origin: London, England
- Genres: Reggae; dance; soul
- Occupation: Singer
- Instrument: Vocals
- Years active: 1960s–present
- Labels: Hansa; Sony-BMG; Mega; Dureco; Dove House
- Member of: Boney M.
- Website: Liz Mitchell website

Elizabeth Rebecca Pemberton-Mitchell (born 12 July 1952) is a British singer and one of the original singers of the 1970s disco and reggae band Boney M.

== Early life ==
Mitchell was born in the parish of Clarendon, British Jamaica. At the age of eleven, in 1963 Mitchell and her family emigrated to Harlesden in London, England. By the end of the decade, she auditioned for Hair and eventually moved to West Berlin to join the German cast, where she replaced Donna Summer. After Hair, Mitchell joined the Les Humphries Singers for a few years and represented West Germany at the Eurovision Song Contest with the Ralph Siegel title "Sing Sang Song". The band was then reduced to only six singers (Mitchell was not one of them) for the show (their usual line-ups consisted of 20 performers and up) and came in 15th place with 12 points, which they regarded as their beginning of the end as a band.

== Boney M. ==
A phone call from Katja Wolff agency in February 1976 persuaded Mitchell to return to West Germany to join a new group being assembled by record producer Frank Farian, which would become known as Boney M. Though the group's initial purpose was simply to lip-synch for TV and discothèque performances of Farian's song "Baby Do You Wanna Bump", Boney M. soon became a legitimate recording group with Mitchell, Marcia Barrett, and producer Farian as the vocal core. Mitchell became Boney M.'s lead vocalist. She remained with Boney M. until the group disbanded in 1986.

== After Boney M. ==
After the group split up shortly after their 10th anniversary in 1986, fellow group member Bobby Farrell convinced Mitchell, Maizie Williams and a replacement for Marcia Barrett to re-group for a tour in 1987. A recording contract for the group was also arranged. When Farrell and the replacement singer failed to show up for the rehearsals, Mitchell and Williams recruited singer Celena Duncan and dancer Curt Dee Daran for the tour. As Williams had never sung on Boney M.'s recordings, Mitchell ended up recording the scheduled album on her own.

However, it proved difficult for Mitchell to find a record label to release the album, entitled No One Will Force You. It was released in Spain in the autumn of 1988, supported by the singles "Mandela" (a re-working of Boney M.'s 1979 hit "El Lute") and "Niños De La Playa" ("Children of the Beach"). The latter was also released on Mega Records in Scandinavia, where the group did a tour in October. By this point, Williams had been replaced by Carol Grey.

At the same time, Simon Napier-Bell had produced a remix album of Boney M.'s greatest hits and wanted the original line-up to promote it. Mitchell accepted the offer, and Boney M. appeared together again on German and Dutch TV, even though Mitchell's new line-up still had gigs to play.

The success of the remix album led Mitchell to sign her album for a French and Dutch release in 1989, and due to personal differences within the group, she eventually decided to focus on her solo career. Even though Madeleine Davis took her place in the group, Farian eventually called Mitchell back for a second remix album by the end of 1989 and also had her front a new Boney M. line-up for the single "Stories", as an answer-back to an unofficial Boney M. single, "Everybody Wants to Dance Like Josephine Baker", recorded by the other three with Madeleine Davis, without Farian's approval.

In 1990, Mitchell re-formed her 1988 line-up, with Patricia Foster replacing Celena Duncan, and kept touring the cabaret circuit. In April 1991, Mitchell released the single "Mocking Bird", produced by longtime Boney M. collaborator Helmut Rulofs, to minimal attention. After three unsuccessful years, the success of the Boney M. compilation Gold - 20 Super Hits boosted the career of her line-up, entitled 'Boney M. feat. Liz Mitchell', and they were officially approved by Farian to promote the album and the accompanying singles. For the follow-up, More Gold - 20 Super Hits Vol. II, Mitchell recorded four new songs. No One Will Force You, with two previously unreleased tracks from 1984, was also re-released in Denmark, five years after it was recorded.

In 1996, Mitchell and her husband Thomas Pemberton built the Dove House Studios and formed Dove House Records. With a newly founded fan club, Mitchell recorded an EP with four Christmas songs.

In November 1999, Mitchell released her album Share the World, which had taken three years to complete. In November 2000, she released the seasonal album Christmas Rose, which consisted of partly new material, including the title track, "Lord's Prayer" and "I Want to Go to Heaven" co-written by herself, and partly re-recordings of Boney M.'s Christmas Album.

Mitchell, now a born-again Christian, continued the inspirational path on Let It Be, her fourth solo album, released in November 2004. Just a few months later, the album Liz Mitchell Sings the Hits of Boney M., recorded in Prague, backed by a Czech symphony orchestra, was released. A song recorded in 2006, called "A Moment Of Love", is on the compilation album The Magic of Boney M..

Mitchell is still touring, billed as Boney M. featuring Liz Mitchell. Mitchell's daughter sings alongside her.

In 2014, a Federation of Reggae Music and Brent Council blue plaque was unveiled at Mitchell's childhood home on Wrottesley Road in Harlesden, London, where her father still resided at this time. Mitchell now resides in Caversham, Reading.

Mitchell was appointed Member of the Order of the British Empire (MBE) in the 2024 Birthday Honours for services to music and to charity.

== Personal life ==
Mitchell has three children.

== Discography ==
Albums

- No One Will Force You (1988, re-released 1989 and 1993)
- Share the World (1999)
- Christmas Rose (2000)
- Let It Be (2004)
- Liz Mitchell Sings the Hits of Boney M. (2005)

7" singles

- "Got a Man on My Mind" / "Perfect" (Hansa 11 327 AT, West Germany 1977)

"Got a Man on My Mind" was taken from Boney M.'s 1976 album Take the Heat Off Me. "Perfect" was a 1974 demo with Malcolm Magaron (despite the label crediting Farian as the producer).

- "Mandela" / "Reggae People" (Horus 50.067, Spain 1988)
- "Niños de la Playa" / "Time Is a River" (Horus 50.080, Spain 1988 / Mega Records MRCS 2354, Scandinavia 1988)
- "Mandela" / "Reggae People" (Dureco 11 008 77, Holland 1989)
- "Marinero" / "Love Is Bleeding" (Dureco 11 912 07, Holland 1989 / Tréma 410 478 PM 102, France 1989)
- "Mocking Bird" / "Tropical Fever" (Hansa 114 123-100, Germany 1991)

CD singles

- "Mocking Bird" (Radio Version) 3:45 / "Tropical Fever" 3:55 / "Mocking Bird" (Club Mix) 5:25 (Hansa 664 123–211, Germany 1991)
- "Reggae People" 3:09 / "Mandela" 4:42 (CMC 4938-SCD, Denmark 1993)
- "Sunshine" (Radio Mix) (4:36) / (Club Mix) (5:50) / (Extended Radio Mix) (5:14)/ (Extended Club Mix) (5:19) (Dove House DHR 0003 CD, 1999)
- "Christmas Rose" (3:53) / 2. "Lord's Prayer" (3:53) (Dove House DHR 0004 CD, 1999)
- "Let It Be" (4:08) / "You're Excellent" (3:50) (Dove House DHR 0009 CD, 2004)
- "My Life Is in Your Hands" (5:04) / "I Want To Go To Heaven" (4:08) / "Share The World" (Remix) (4:26) / "When A Child Is Born" (3:40) / "Grandmother's Song" (4:27) (Dove House DHR 0012 CD, 2006)
