= Daddy Cool (Boney M. song) =

1976 single by Boney M.

- German picture sleeve (used in other territories)

Single by Boney M.

from the album Take the Heat off Me
- B-side: "No Woman, No Cry"
- Released: 31 May 1976
- Genre: Disco
- Length: 3:28
- Label: Hansa (FRG); Atlantic (United Kingdom); Atco (United States)
- Songwriters: Frank Farian; George Reyam
- Producer: Frank Farian

Boney M. singles chronology
"Baby Do You Wanna Bump" (1975)	"Daddy Cool" (1976)	"Sunny" (1976)

Music video
- "Daddy Cool" on YouTube

"Daddy Cool" is a song produced and co-written by Frank Farian, who had founded the group Boney M. to visually perform to his songs on TV and at discos. Farian also provided the male voice parts on the record. The song was included on their debut album Take the Heat off Me. It was a 1976 hit and a staple of disco music and Boney M.'s first hit in the United Kingdom.

The second Boney M. single, it was released in 1976 and made no major impact at first. After a presentation on the German TV show Musikladen in September that year, the single became a hit, topping several European charts. It reached number six in the UK charts and number 65 in the United States Billboard Hot 100. The single also topped the German charts and reached the Top 20 in Canada. It proved to be the band's major European breakthrough.

== Background ==
"Daddy Cool" was a novelty gimmick record with an unusual, percussive intro by Farian doing rhythmic tic-tic-tics and playing on his teeth with a pencil. Farian also sang all the male voice parts (Bobby Farrell always danced to full playback). His characteristic deep voice sings: "She's crazy like a fool" and is answered by the multilayered voices of Liz Mitchell and Marcia Barrett: "wild about Daddy Cool". This line was misheard by listeners as "what about Daddy Cool", so much so that the band started singing it that way during live performances. The bass riff kicks in and builds to the instrumental theme followed by the repetitive, nursery rhyme-like verse and chorus twice.

The song breaks down into a spoken passage by Farian before the bass riff returns and the verse and chorus repeat for the last time. With its repetitive bass line and strings and likewise repetitive, bright female vocals, the track is highly typical of mid-1970s "Munich disco".

Originally, Hansa Records wanted Boney M.'s cover of Bob Marley's "No Woman, No Cry" as the A-side of the single but Farian—seeing that his own song was the clear winner when testing both tracks in his discothèque in Sankt Ingbert—persuaded the record company to have it his way. In the US, Hungary, and Japan (where the single was released in November), the single was backed by the album track "Lovin' or Leavin'". In East Germany, the record was released in 1977, backed by Boney M.'s next hit, "Sunny".

== Charts ==
=== Weekly charts ===
Chart (1976–1977)	Peak Position
Australia (Kent Music Report)	5
Austria (Ö3 Austria Top 40)	1
Belgium (Ultratop 50 Flanders)	1
Canada Dance/Urban (RPM)	8
Canada Top Singles (RPM)	18
Europe (Eurochart Hot 100)	1
Finland (Suomen Virallinen)	2
France (IFOP)	1
Italy (Musica e dischi)	3
Netherlands (Dutch Top 40)	3
Netherlands (Single Top 100)	3
New Zealand (Recorded Music NZ)	15
Norway (VG-lista)	1
South Africa (Springbok Radio)	2
Spain (AFE)	1
Sweden (Sverigetopplistan)	1
Switzerland (Schweizer Hitparade)	1
UK Singles (Official Charts)	6
US Billboard Hot 100	65
US Cash Box	90
West Germany (GfK)	1

Chart (2021)	Peak Position
Hungary (Single Top 40)	33

=== Year-end charts ===
Chart (1976)	Rank
Austria (Ö3 Austria Top 40)	10
Belgium (Ultratop 50 Flanders)	7
France (IFOP)	2
Netherlands (Dutch Top 40)	12
Netherlands (Single Top 100)	10
Switzerland (Schweizer Hitparade)	7
West Germany (Official German Charts)	17

Chart (1977)	Rank
Australia (Kent Music Report)	35
Austria (Ö3 Austria Top 40)	20
South Africa (Springbok Radio)	18
West Germany (Official German Charts)	44

== Certifications and sales ==
Region	Certification	Certified units/sales
Canada (Music Canada)	Gold	75,000^{^}
Denmark (IFPI Danmark)	Gold	45,000^{‡}
France (SNEP)	Gold	1,000,000
Germany (BVMI)	Gold	800,000
Italy (FIMI)	Gold	35,000^{‡}
New Zealand (RMNZ)	Platinum	30,000^{‡}
Spain (Promusicae)	Gold	30,000^{‡}
United Kingdom (BPI) Original Release	Silver	250,000^{^}
United Kingdom (BPI) 2004 Digital Reissue	Platinum	600,000^{‡}
Summaries
Benelux	Platinum	
^{^} Shipments figures based on certification alone.^{‡} Sales+streaming figures based on certification alone.

== 1986 anniversary recording ==
"Daddy Cool - Anniversary Recording '86"

Single by Boney M.
- Released: 1986
- Length: 5:18 (7" mix); 9:07 (12" mix)
- Label: Hansa (FRG)
- Songwriters: Frank Farian; George Reyam
- Producer: Frank Farian

Boney M. singles chronology
"Young, Free and Single" (1985)	"Daddy Cool - Anniversary Recording '86" (1986)	"Bang Bang Lulu" (1986)

Boney M.'s 10th anniversary was celebrated with a TV special and the album The Best of 10 Years – 32 Superhits. The original plans of releasing another single ("Dreadlock Holiday") from the group's final album Eye Dance were cancelled, instead producer Frank Farian recorded a new version of "Daddy Cool" in a special "anniversary recording", featuring rap parts, and new instrumental parts. The single, however, proved to be Boney M.'s worst-selling single, failing to chart anywhere. The B-side "B.M.A.G.O." appeared in a longer version on the 7" than on the 12" single. The 12" single also included an edit version of "Daddy Cool" which was not credited on the cover. The 7" version made its CD debut on The Collection (disc 2, track 1).

=== Releases ===
7" Single

- ""Daddy Cool (Anniversary Recording '86)" – (Farian, Reyam, Farian, Bischof) 5:18 / "B.M.A.G.O." (Farian) – 4:10 (Hansa Records 107 994–100, 1986)

12" Single

- "Daddy Cool (Anniversary Recording '86)" Special Club Mix – 9:07 / Extended Radio Edit (Not credited on label) – 5:50 / "B.M.A.G.O." – 3:15 (Hansa 607 994–213, 1986)

== Boney M. 2000 version ==
"Daddy Cool '99"

Single by Boney M.

from the album 20th Century Hits
- Released: 1999
- Label: BMG (FRG)
- Songwriters: Frank Farian; George Reyam
- Producer: Frank Farian

Boney M. singles chronology
"Ma Baker (Boney M. vs. Sash!)" (1998)	"Daddy Cool '99" (1999)	"Hooray! Hooray! (Caribbean Night Fever)" (1999)

Following the successful Sash! and Horny United remixes of "Ma Baker", Frank Farian remixed "Daddy Cool" as a follow-up single. An all-new line-up Boney M. 2000 featuring three young girls and rapper Mobi T. was featured in the video and also announced to front a forthcoming remix album. This decision was not popular with the group's fan base, and Farian subsequently dropped the idea. "Daddy Cool" could not match the success of its predecessor, peaking only at no. 47 in the German charts.

=== Releases ===
CD Single

1. "Daddy Cool '99 (Radio Edit)" – 3:51
2. "Daddy Cool '99 (Extended Vocal Club Mix)" – 5:06
3. "Daddy Cool '99 (Latino Club Mix)" – 3:33
4. "Daddy Cool '99 (Solid Gold Edit)" – 3:45
5. "Daddy Cool (Original Mix 1976)" – 3:26

12" Single

1. "Daddy Cool '99 (Extended Vocal Club Mix)" – 5:06
2. "Daddy Cool '99 (Disco Dub Edit)" – 4:26
3. "Daddy Cool '99 (Latino Club Mix)" – 3:33
4. "Daddy Cool '99 (Solid Gold Edit)" – 3:45

=== Charts ===
Chart (1999)	Peak position
Belgium (Ultratip Bubbling Under Flanders)	2
Denmark (IFPI)	9
Europe (Eurochart Hot 100)	42
France (SNEP)	16
Germany (GfK)	47
Hungary (Mahasz)	3
Sweden (Sverigetopplistan)	19
Switzerland (Schweizer Hitparade)	49

Chart (2000)	Peak position
France (SNEP)	99
Switzerland (Schweizer Hitparade)	94

Chart (2013)	Peak position
France (SNEP)	138

== 2001 Remix ==
"Daddy Cool 2001"

Single by Boney M.

from the album The Greatest Hits
- Released: 2001
- Label: BMG (United Kingdom)
- Songwriters: Frank Farian; George Reyam
- Producer: Frank Farian

Boney M. singles chronology
"Sunny (Remix)" (2001)	"Daddy Cool 2001" (2001)	"Sunny (Mousse T. Remix)" (2006)

Music video
- "Daddy Cool 2001” on YouTube

United Kingdom 2001 remix to support the album The Greatest Hits. Remixed by Jewels & Stone, the single peaked at no. 47 in the United Kingdom charts.

=== Releases ===
CD Single

1. "Daddy Cool" (Jewels & Stone Radio Edit) – 3:58
2. "Daddy Cool" (Original Mix) – 3:25
3. "Daddy Cool" (Jewels & Stone Club Mix) – 5:18

Chart (2001)	Peak position
UK Singles (Official Charts)	47

== Lizot remix ==
"Daddy Cool"

Single by Lizot x Boney M.

from the album The Magic of Boney M. (Special Remix Edition)
- Released: 3 December 2021
- Length: 2:34
- Label: Nitron; Sony
- Songwriters: Frank Farian; George Reyam

Music video
- "Daddy Cool" on YouTube

German DJ duo Lizot released a remix of "Daddy Cool" on 3 December 2021.

=== Releases ===
Digital single

1. "Daddy Cool" – 2:34

Club VIP mix

1. "Daddy Cool" (Club VIP mix) – 2:50
2. "Daddy Cool" (Extended Club VIP mix) – 3:50
3. "Daddy Cool" – 2:34
4. "Daddy Cool" (Extended mix) – 3:36

=== Charts ===
==== Weekly charts ====
Weekly chart performance for "Daddy Cool"
Chart (2021–2022)	Peak position
Poland Airplay (ZPAV)	4

==== Year-end charts ====
2022 year-end chart performance for "Daddy Cool"
Chart (2022)	Position
Poland (ZPAV)	83

== Cover versions and sports usage ==
Placebo included a cover version in their 2003 album Covers. The song was covered by Latvian trio Melo-M featuring vocals by original Boney M. singer Maizie Williams on their 2007 album Singalongs. "Daddy Cool" was used in an advert for Vauxhall, promoting their Zafira GSi, as well as in a Venmo ad in 2024. The song was sampled by Korean hip hop band DJ Doc for their 2000 single "Run to You".

Raghav Sachar recreated the song for the 2009 Hindi film of the same name as its title theme.

The song is sung by Rangers supporters (and previously Sheffield Wednesday supporters) in adulation for their manager Danny Röhl. In place of the lyric 'Daddy, Daddy Cool' the supporters passionately sing "Danny, Danny Röhl'. Danny Röhl has spoken of his thankfulness and confirmed that the first time he heard it sung that it gave him goosebumps.

== See also ==
- Lists of number-one singles (Austria)
- List of European number-one hits of 1976
- List of number-one singles of 1976 (France)
- List of number-one hits of 1976 (Germany)
- List of number-one songs in Norway
- List of number-one singles of 1977 (Spain)
- List of number-one singles and albums in Sweden
- List of number-one singles from 1968 to 1979 (Switzerland)
