= Christmas with Boney M. =

Compilation album by Boney M.
- Released: 1984
- Recorded: 1981, 1984
- Genre: R&B, Christmas, Euro disco
- Label: Gallo Records (South Africa)
- Producer: Frank Farian

Boney M. chronology
Fantastic Boney M. (1984)	Christmas with Boney M. (1984)	Eye Dance (1985)

Christmas with Boney M. a.k.a. (New) Christmas with Boney M. is an aborted second Christmas album turned into a compilation. The album was exclusively released in South Africa where the group's popularity—contrary to the rest of the world—remained high during the early 80s. The album is a sought-after item for Boney M. collectors since it includes the original recording "Mother and Child Reunion" with Reggie Tsiboe and La Mama which was remixed and overdubbed with additional vocals for a 1985 charity single for Ethiopia, released by Frank Farian Corporation. The album has never been released on CD.

After the commercial failure with the Ten Thousand Lightyears album, Frank Farian gathered Liz Mitchell and new member Reggie Tsiboe to record a second Christmas album in the hope of repeating the success of 1981's Christmas Album. Backed by two classically trained singers, the twin sisters Amy & Elaine Goff, Farian recorded six new titles before he changed his plans and had Reggie record "Kalimba de Luna"—a current hit in Italy—which, when released as a Boney M. title, gave the group a European hit single, quickly followed by another cover of an Italian hit, "Happy Song". To benefit from the Christmas sales, Farian hastily put together two compilation albums Kalimba de Luna – 16 Happy Songs and a seasonal-themed "Christmas With Boney M.", mixing the six new Christmas songs with six previously released titles which all had a seasonal or semi-religious flair to them. Hansa chose just to release the "Kalimba De Luna" compilation on the strength of the two new hit singles, and the second Christmas album never went further than the test pressing stage. Boney M.'s South-African record company, Gallo, however, went for the Christmas release and furthermore added "Little Drummer Boy" and "Mary's Boy Child" from the first Christmas Album and replaced "Exodus" with "Children of Paradise".

The new Christmas songs were made available to the rest of the world two years later when Hansa released the album The 20 Greatest Christmas Songs.

== Track listing ==
Gallo LP ML 4780, South Africa

=== Side A ===
1. "O Tannenbaum (Oh Christmas Tree)" (Traditional, Farian) – 2:57
2. "Joy to the World" (Lowell Mason, Isaac Watts) – 2:32
3. "Oh Come All Ye Faithful" (Traditional, Farian) – 3:41
4. "The First Noel" (William B. Sandys) – 3:03
5. "Hark the Herald Angels Sing" (Felix Mendelssohn, Charles Wesley, Farian) – 3:03
  - Tracks A1–A5: new recordings (1984)
6. "Little Drummer Boy" (Katherine K. Davis, Henry Onorati, Harry Simeone) – 4:21
  - From the Christmas Album (1981)
7. "Somewhere in the World" (Davis, Grohe, Keilhauer) – 4:38
  - From the album Ten Thousand Lightyears (1984)

=== Side B ===
1. "Mother and Child Reunion" (Paul Simon) – 4:06
  - New recording (1984)
2. "I'm Born Again" (Jay, Rulofs) – 3:56
  - Edit from The Magic of Boney M. – 20 Golden Hits (1980)
3. "Children of Paradise" (Farian, Jay, Reyam) – 3:20
  - Edit (1980)
4. "Ribbons of Blue" (Keith Forsey) – 3:03
  - Edit from The Magic of Boney M. – 20 Golden Hits (1980)
5. "Mary's Boy Child – Oh My Lord" (Jester Hairston, Farian) – 4:31
  - Edit (1978)
6. "Hooray! Hooray! It's a Holi-Holiday" (Farian, Jay) – 3:09
  - Edit from The Magic of Boney M. – 20 Golden Hits (1980)
7. "Auld Lang Syne" (Robert Burns, Traditional) – 2:34
  - New recording (1984)

== Alternate Edition ==
Hansa Test-pressing 206 733-000, Germany

=== Side A ===
1. "O Tannenbaum (Oh Christmas Tree)" – 2:57
2. "Oh Come All Ye Faithful" – 3:41
3. "Joy to the World" – 2:32
4. "Hark the Herald Angels Sing" – 3:03
5. "The First Noel" – 3:03
  - Tracks A1–A5: new recordings (1984)
6. "Somewhere in the World" – 4:21
  - Edited version, from the album Ten Thousand Lightyears (1984)

=== Side B ===
1. "Mother and Child Reunion" – 4:06
  - New recording (1984)
2. "I'm Born Again" - 4:18
  - Single version. From the album Oceans of Fantasy (1979)
3. "Exodus (Noah's Ark 2001)" – 4:36
  - Single edit. From the album Ten Thousand Lightyears (1984)
4. "Ribbons of Blue" – 4:05
  - Original single version (1979)
5. "Hooray! Hooray! It's a Holi-Holiday" – 3:55
  - Original single version (1979)
6. "Auld Lang Syne" – 2:46
  - New recording (1984)

== Personnel ==
- Liz Mitchell – lead vocals on "Hark the Herald Angels Sing", "Little Drummer Boy", "Somewhere in the World", "I'm Born Again", "Exodus", "Children of Paradise", "Ribbons of Blue", "Hooray! Hooray!" and "Mary's Boy Child".
- Marcia Barrett – backing vocals on "Somewhere in the World", "Exodus", "Children of Paradise", "Ribbons of Blue", "Hooray! Hooray!" and "Mary's Boy Child".
- Frank Farian – backing vocals, producer, remixer
- Reggie Tsiboe – lead vocals on "Joy to the World", "The First Noel", "Mother and Child Reunion", "Auld Lang Syne", backing vocals
- Amy & Elaine Goff – lead vocals on "Oh Come All Ye Faithful", backing vocals (1984 recordings)
- La Mama (Madeleine Davis, Patricia Shockley, Judy Cheeks) – backing vocals "Mother and Child Reunion"

== Sources and external links ==
- at Discogs.com, detailed discography
- Allmusic, biography, discography etc.
