= Christmas with Boney M. (2007 album) =

Compilation album by Boney M.
- Released: 16 November 2007
- Recorded: 1978, 1981, 1984
- Genres: R&B, pop, Euro disco
- Producer: Frank Farian

Boney M. chronology
Hit Collection (2007)	Christmas with Boney M. (2007)	The Collection (2008)

Christmas with Boney M. is a Christmas compilation by Boney M., released on 16 November 2007. It is a reissue of The 20 Greatest Christmas Songs with a reordered tracklist that restores the two songs from the original Christmas Album which were originally excluded, and a 2007 recording by the Daddy Cool Kids as a bonus track. This compilation follows the 2007 re-release of Boney M.'s original studio albums.

In Canada, the release of this album by Sony BMG Music (Canada) Inc. does not include the last two tracks, tracks 18 and 19.

== Track listing ==
1. "Mary's Boy Child – Oh My Lord" (Jester Hairston, Lorin, Frank Farian, Fred Jay) – 5:09
  - 1981 edit
2. "When a Child Is Born" (Fred Jay, Zacar) – 3:20
3. "White Christmas" (Irving Berlin) – 3:21
  - 1982 edit
4. "Feliz Navidad" (José Feliciano) – 2:21
  - 1986 remix
5. "Jingle Bells" (James Lord Pierpont, Frank Farian) – 3:28
  - 1986 remix
6. "Zion's Daughter (Tochter Zion)" (Traditional, George Frideric Handel, Frank Farian, Fred Jay, Helmut Rulofs) – 3:51
  - 1986 remix
7. "Darkness Is Falling" (Fred Jay, Helmut Rulofs) – 3:02
  - 1986 remix
8. "Hark the Herald Angels Sing" (Felix Mendelssohn, Charles Wesley, Farian) – 3:03
  - recorded 1984
9. "Little Drummer Boy" (Katherine K. Davis, Henry Onorati, Harry Simeone) – 4:27
10. "The First Noel" (Traditional) – 3:03
  - recorded 1984
11. "Oh Christmas Tree" (Traditional, Farian) – 2:57
  - recorded 1984
12. "I'll Be Home for Christmas" (Catherine Courage, Frank Farian, Helmut Rulofs) – 3:54
13. "Oh Come All Ye Faithful" (John Francis Wade, Farian) – 3:41
  - recorded 1984
14. "Petit Papa Noël" (Martinet, Vincy) – 1:41
15. "Winter Fairy-Tale" (Instrumental) (Baierl) – 2:58
16. "Joy to the World" (Lowell Mason, Isaac Watts) – 2:32
  - recorded 1984
17. "Auld Lang Syne" (Robert Burns) – 2:34
  - recorded 1984
18. Christmas Medley: "Silent Night, Holy Night (Stille Nacht, Heilige Nacht)"/ "Snow Falls Over the Ground (Leise Rieselt Der Schnee)" / "Hear Ye the Message" / "Sweet Bells (Süßer die Glocken nie klingen)" (Franz Xaver Gruber, Joseph Mohr, Eduard Ebel, Traditional, Frank Farian, Fred Jay) – 7:51
  - 1986 version
19. "Mary's Boy Child" / "Oh My Lord" – 4:45
  - new recording 2007 by Daddy Cool Kids

== Personnel ==
- Liz Mitchell – lead vocals
- Marcia Barrett – backing vocals
- Reggie Tsiboe – lead vocals on "Joy to the World", "The First Noel", "Auld Lang Syne", backing vocals (1984 recordings)
- Frank Farian – lead vocal on "I'll Be Home for Christmas", backing vocals
- The Christmas Choir from London – backing vocals (1981 recordings)
- Amy & Elaine Goff – lead vocals on "Oh Come All Ye Faithful", backing vocals (1984 recordings)

== Charts ==
=== Weekly charts ===
Weekly charts
Chart (2007–2008)	Peak position
Australian Albums (ARIA)	46
Austrian Albums (Ö3 Austria)	35
German Albums (Offizielle Top 100)	57
New Zealand Albums (RMNZ)	6
Spanish Albums (Promusicae)	86
Swiss Albums (Schweizer Hitparade)	95

Weekly charts
Chart (2025)	Peak position
Nigerian Albums (TurnTable)	73

== Certifications ==
Certifications for Christmas with Boney M.
Region	Certification	Certified units/sales
New Zealand (RMNZ)	Gold	7,500^{^}
^{^} Shipments figures based on certification alone.
