= The Greatest Hits (2001 Boney M. album) =

Greatest hits album by Boney M.
- Released: 2001
- Recorded: 1976–1980, 1989, 1992, 2001
- Genre: Eurodance, pop, Euro disco
- Length: 74:14
- Label: BMG (UK)
- Producer: Frank Farian

Boney M. chronology
| Their Most Beautiful Ballads (2000) | The Greatest Hits (2001) | The Magic of Boney M. (2006) |

Singles from The Greatest Hits
- 1. "Daddy Cool 2001" Released: 2001

Professional ratings
Review scores
| Source | Rating |
|---|---|
| AllMusic | 4.5/5 stars |

The Greatest Hits is a greatest hits album of recordings by Boney M. released by BMG in the United Kingdom in late 2001.

While the Netherlands, Belgium and Denmark celebrated Boney M's 25 year anniversary with comprehensive double albums, BMG UK opted for a one disc release, The Greatest Hits. The album included a new remix of 1976 break-through single "Daddy Cool", which was released as a single and reached the top 50 in the UK. While most of the tracks of this hits package are the original album versions it contains some overdubbed or remixed versions dating from Gold – 20 Super Hits.

In 2002 the compilation was issued in the United States by RCA, now a sub-label of Sony BMG, and in Australia it was released under the name Australia's Greatest Hits.

== Track listing ==
1. "Daddy Cool" (Frank Farian, George Reyam) – 3:30
2. "Rivers of Babylon" (album version) (Farian, Reyam) – 4:22
3. "Brown Girl in the Ring" (Farian) – 4:03
4. "Ma Baker" (Farian, Fred Jay, Reyam) – 4:36
5. "Rasputin" (album version, early fade) (Farian, Jay, Reyam) – 4:30
6. "Sunny" (Bobby Hebb) – 4:02
7. "Belfast" (Jimmy Bilsbury, Drafi Deutscher, Joe Menke) – 3:31
8. "Hooray! Hooray! It's a Holi-Holiday" (Farian, Jay) – 3:58
9. "Painter Man" (Eddie Phillips, Kenny Pickett) – 3:12
10. "Gotta Go Home" (Farian, Jay, Heinz Huth, Jürgen Huth) – 3:47
11. "Mary's Boy Child – Oh My Lord" (Jester Hairston, Farian, Jay, Hela Lorin) – 5:09
12. "No Woman, No Cry" (Bob Marley) – 4:19
13. "El Lute" (Farian, Jay, Hans Blum) – 4:00
14. "Nightflight to Venus" (Farian, Jay, Dietmar Kawohl) – 3:51
15. "I'm Born Again" (album version) (Jay, Helmut Rulofs) – 4:10
16. "My Friend Jack" (The Smoke) – 4:30
17. "Daddy Cool" (Remix 2001 - Jewels & Stone Club Mix) (Farian, Reyam) – 5:19
18. "Mega Mix" (1992) (Farian, Reyam, Hebb, Jay) – 3:51
- The "Mega Mix" comprises "Rivers of Babylon", "Sunny", "Daddy Cool" and "Rasputin"

== Personnel ==
- Liz Mitchell – lead vocals, backing vocals
- Marcia Barrett – lead vocals, backing vocals
- Frank Farian – lead vocals, backing vocals

Production

- Frank Farian – producer, remixer
- Jewels & Stone – remixers (track 17)

== Charts ==
| Chart (2001) | Peak position |
|---|---|
| UK Albums (OCC) | 66 |

== Certifications ==
| Region | Certification | Certified units/sales |
|---|---|---|
| United Kingdom (BPI) | Gold | 100,000^{‡} |
^{‡} Sales+streaming figures based on certification alone.

== Release history ==
- 2001 UK: BMG 74321 896142
- 2001 Australia: Australia's Greatest Hits, BMG International 89614
- 2002 US: RCA 65108
