= The Magic of Boney M. =

- Original release

Compilation album by Boney M.
- Released: 27 October 2006
- Recorded: 1975–1984
- Genres: Eurodance; pop; Euro disco
- Length: 74:24
- Label: Sony BMG (Europe)
- Producer: Frank Farian

Boney M. chronology
The Greatest Hits (2001)	The Magic of Boney M. (2006)	Rivers of Babylon: Presenting Boney M. (2008)

Professional ratings
Review scores
Source	Rating
AllMusic	4/5 stars

The Magic of Boney M. is a compilation album by German disco group Boney M., released by Sony BMG in October 2006. An updated version of 1992's Gold – 20 Super Hits and 2001's The Greatest Hits, the compilation includes eighteen of the group's best known hits from the 1970s and 1980s, a new remix of 1976 single "Sunny" by German DJ and record producer Mousse T., as well as one new track featuring vocals from original Boney M. lead vocalist Liz Mitchell.

While this compilation is digitally remastered it contains both original recordings and overdubbed or remixed versions dating from Gold - 20 Super Hits.

The compilation was reissued on 18 March 2022 with new artwork as a special "remix edition". This release replaces "A Moment of Love" with the 2021 remixes of "Rasputin" and "Daddy Cool", along with a previously unreleased Spanish version of "Rivers of Babylon" entitled "Rios de Babylonia".

== Track listing ==
The Magic of Boney M. track listing
No.	Title	Writer(s)	Length
1.	"Daddy Cool"	Frank Farian; George Reyam	3:28
2.	"Sunny" (1992 overdub mix)	Bobby Hebb	3:57
3.	"Rivers of Babylon" (single version, 1992 overdub mix)	Brent Dowe; Trevor McNaughton; Farian; Reyam	4:16
4.	"El Lute" (remix ‘89 edit)	Hans Blum; Farian; Fred Jay	4:00
5.	"No Woman, No Cry" (1992 overdub mix)	Bob Marley	4:18
6.	"Hooray! Hooray! It's a Holi-Holiday" (1992 overdub mix)	Frank Farian/Fred Jay	3:56
7.	"Rasputin" (single version, 1992 overdub mix)	Farian; Jay; Reyam	4:26
8.	"Painter Man" (1992 overdub mix)	Kenny Pickett; Eddie Phillips	3:17
9.	"Belfast" (1992 overdub mix)	Jimmy Bilsbury; Drafi Deutscher; Joe Menke	3:27
10.	"Brown Girl in the Ring" (1992 overdub mix)	Farian	4:01
11.	"Kalimba de Luna" (1992 overdub mix)	Gianluigi Di Franco; Giuseppe Amoruso; Tony Esposito; Remo Licastro; Mauro Malavasi	4:13
12.	"Happy Song" (single version edit)	Abacap; Ottavio Bacciocchi; Ivana Spagna	3:58
13.	"Still I’m Sad" (1992 overdub mix)	Jim McCarty; Paul Samwell-Smith	4:25
14.	"Mary's Boy Child – Oh My Lord" (radio version ‘92)	Jester Hairston; Farian; Jay; Hela Lorin	4:02
15.	"Baby Do You Wanna Bump" (1992 overdub mix)	Zambi	2:27
16.	"Felicidad (Margherita)" (1992 overdub mix)	Pino Massara; Rosella Conz	2:51
17.	"Gotta Go Home" (1992 overdub mix)	Farian; Heinz Huth; Jürgen Huth; Jay	2:33
18.	"Ma Baker" (1992 overdub mix)	Farian; Jay; Reyam	4:06
19.	"Sunny" (Mousse T. radio mix)	Hebb	3:20
20.	"A Moment of Love"	Farian; M. Bofaba	3:13
Total length:			74:24

- Track 20 is a new recording with lead vocals from Liz Mitchell. The choral backing vocals are unknown.
- The UK release features a slightly realigned track list, however the content is the same.
- The Australian release replaces "Kalimba de Luna" with the 1986 remix of "Feliz Navidad", originally released on The 20 Greatest Christmas Songs.

2CD edition bonus disc
No.	Title	Length
1.	"Magic Mega Mix 2006" (Medley of "Daddy Cool" (intro), "Gotta Go Home", "Rasputin", "Sunny", "Ma Baker" and "Daddy Cool")	5:11

2022 "special remix edition" bonus tracks
No.	Title	Writer(s)	Length
20.	"Rasputin" (Majestic x Boney M.)	Farian; Jay; Reyam	3:06
21.	"Daddy Cool" (Lizot x Boney M.)	Farian; Reyam	2:35
22.	"Rios de Babylonia" (Spanish version)	Dowe; McNaughton; Farian; Reyam	4:07
Total length:			80:58

- "Rios de Babylonia" is a newly recorded Spanish version of "Rivers of Babylon", featuring vocals Yulee B. and Frank Farian.

== Personnel ==
- Liz Mitchell – lead vocals, backing vocals
- Marcia Barrett – lead vocals, backing vocals
- Frank Farian – lead vocals, backing vocals
- Reggie Tsiboe – lead vocals, backing vocals (tracks 11 & 12)
- Bobby Farrell – vocals (track 12)
- Yulee B – vocals "Rios de Babylonia"

== Production ==
- Frank Farian – producer
- Mousse T. – remixer

== Single release ==
- "Sunny" (Mousse T. Remix) digital download (Sony BMG)
1. "Sunny" (Mousse T. Radio Mix) – 3:21
2. "Sunny" (Mousse T. Sexy Disco Radio Mix) – 3:27
3. "Sunny" (Mousse T. Extended Radio Mix) – 4:17
4. "Sunny" (Mousse T. Sexy Disco Club Mix) – 5:48

== Charts ==
2006–2007 weekly chart performance for The Magic of Boney M.
Chart (2006–2007)	Peak position
Australian Albums (ARIA)	28
Austrian Albums (Ö3 Austria)	13
Danish Albums (Hitlisten)	16
Dutch Albums (Album Top 100)	94
Finnish Albums (Suomen virallinen lista)	27
French Albums (SNEP)	154
German Albums (Offizielle Top 100)	19
Malaysian International Albums (RIM)	2
New Zealand Albums (RMNZ)	2
Norwegian Albums (VG-lista)	2
Spanish Albums (Promusicae)	23
Swedish Albums (Sverigetopplistan)	5
Swiss Albums (Schweizer Hitparade)	39
UK Albums (Official Charts)	45

2022 weekly chart performance for The Magic of Boney M.
Chart (2022)	Peak position
Austrian Albums (Ö3 Austria)	10
Belgian Albums (Ultratop Flanders)	84
Belgian Albums (Ultratop Wallonia)	159
German Albums (Offizielle Top 100)	7
Hungarian Albums (MAHASZ)	24
Portuguese Albums (AFP)	36

== Certifications ==
Certifications for The Magic of Boney M.
Region	Certification	Certified units/sales
Australia (ARIA)	Gold	35,000^{^}
Canada (Music Canada)	Gold	50,000^{^}
Ireland (IRMA)	Gold	7,500^{^}
^{^} Shipments figures based on certification alone.
