= PartyTime (album) =

Party Time

Studio album by The Cheeky Girls
- Released: August 11, 2003
- Recorded: 2002–2003
- Genre: Pop
- Length: 39:46
- Label: Multiply Records

The Cheeky Girls chronology
Party Time (2003)	In My Mind (Is A Different World – A Cheeky One) (2007)

Professional ratings
Review scores
Source	Rating
AllMusic	2/5 stars
The Guardian	1/5 stars

PartyTime is The Cheeky Girls' debut album. It reached number 14 in the UK Albums Chart in 2003.

== Track listing ==
1. "Cheeky Song (Touch My Bum)" – 3:24
2. "Salsa in the Disco" – 3:15
3. "Take Your Shoes Off" – 2:58
4. "Get the Party On" – 3:30
5. "Celebration" – 3:12
6. "Summer Fun" – 3:02
7. "Hooray Hooray (It's a Cheeky Holiday)" – 3:04
8. "Mickey Blue" – 4:00
9. "Hip Hop" – 3:30
10. "Magic" – 3:00
11. "Española Dream" – 3:24
12. "Follow My Star" – 3:27

Later re-release bonus tracks

13. "We Go Together" – 2:50
14. "Megamix" – 3:30
15. "Have a Cheeky Christmas" – 3:10

Enhanced section

1. "The Cheeky Song (Touch My Bum)"
2. "Take Your Shoes Off"
3. "Hooray Hooray (It's a Cheeky Holiday)"

== Personnel ==
The following personnel contributed to PartyTime:

=== Cheeky Girls ===
- Monica Irimia
- Gabriela Irimia

=== Additional musicians ===
- Marcus Hutton – Synth (on "Take Your Shoes Off")
- Archie Merrington – Backup Synth (on "Take Your Shoes Off")

== See also ==
- List of music released by Romanian artists that has charted in major music markets
