= Take Your Shoes Off (song) =

2003 single by the Cheeky Girls

Single by the Cheeky Girls

from the album PartyTime
- Released: 5 May 2003
- Length: 2:56
- Label: Multiply
- Songwriter: Margaret Irimia
- Producer: The Cheeky Boyz

The Cheeky Girls singles chronology
"Cheeky Song (Touch My Bum)" (2002)	"Take Your Shoes Off" (2003)	"Hooray Hooray (It's a Cheeky Holiday)" (2003)

"Take Your Shoes Off" is a song by Romanian pop duo the Cheeky Girls. It was released as a single on 5 May 2003 in the United Kingdom. The single debuted at a peak position of number three on the UK Singles Chart and also reached the top 40 in Flanders and Ireland.

== Track listings ==
UK CD1

1. "Take Your Shoes Off" (radio edit) – 2:56
2. "Take Your Shoes Off" (LMC club mix) – 5:52
3. "Take Your Shoes Off" (original extended mix) – 5:58
4. "Take Your Shoes Off" (video)

UK CD2

1. "Take Your Shoes Off" (radio edit) – 2:56
2. "Take Your Shoes Off" (Lockout mix) – 5:47
3. "Take Your Shoes Off" (LMC dub mix) – 5:12

UK cassette single

1. "Take Your Shoes Off" (radio edit) – 2:56
2. "Take Your Shoes Off" (LMC club mix) – 5:52

== Charts ==
=== Weekly charts ===
Chart (2003)	Peak position
Belgium (Ultratop 50 Flanders)	36
Europe (Eurochart Hot 100)	12
Ireland (IRMA)	12
Scotland Singles (OCC)	1
UK Singles (OCC)	3

=== Year-end charts ===
Chart (2003)	Position
UK Singles (OCC)	81

== See also ==
- List of music released by Romanian artists that has charted in major music markets
