= Stories (Boney M. song) =

Single by Boney M.
- Released: March 1990
- Recorded: 1990
- Genre: New jack swing, Pop, Hip hop
- Length: 4:23
- Label: Hansa Records FRG
- Songwriters: Jean Kluger, Ador, Peter Bischof-Fallenstein
- Producer: Frank Farian

Boney M. singles chronology
"Everybody Wants to Dance Like Josephine Baker" (1989)	"Stories" (1990)	"Christmas Mega Mix" (1992)

Music video
- "Boney M. - Stories (Official Video)" on YouTube

"Stories" is a 1990 single by German band Boney M. It peaked at #26 in Switzerland and #94 in the UK. The single was based on an instrumental 1989 underground favourite by Izit, which itself was a re-work of a 1972 recording by Belgian group Chakachas. With added lyrics by Peter Bischof-Fallenstein, "Stories" was released as a response to the withdrawn "Everybody Wants to Dance Like Josephine Baker", released illegally under the group name by original members Marcia Barrett, Bobby Farrell, Maizie Williams and new singer Madeleine Davis. "Stories" launched a short-lived "official" Boney M. line-up consisting of original lead singer Liz Mitchell and Reggie Tsiboe (who had replaced Farrell from 1982-1986) and two new members, Sharon Steven and Patty Onoyewenjo. Never appearing on any studio album by the group, Stories was added as a bonus track on the remastered 2007 edition of the group's 1977 album Love for Sale. An unreleased 3:54 mix was used in the video clip for the track.

== Single releases ==
Germany
7"

- "Stories" - 4:23 / "Rumours" (Instrumental) - 3:14 (Hansa 112 997-100, 1990)

12"

- "Stories" (Special Club Mix) - 7:53 / "Stories" (Radio Mix) - 4:09

Vinyl, 12", 45 RPM, Maxi-Single, (Promo Hansa – 612 997) housed in a special promo only picture cover / A: Different mix from the commercial version. Length of song mentioned on sleeve is incorrect

12"

- "Stories" (Special Club Mix) - 8:06 / "Stories" (Radio Mix) - 4:23 / "Rumours" (Instrumental) 3:14 (Hansa 612 997-213, 1990)

CD

- "Stories" (Special Club Mix) - 8:06 / "Stories" (Radio Mix) - 4:23 / "Rumours" (Instrumental) - 3:14 (Hansa 662 997-211, 1990)

== Personnel ==
- Reggie Tsiboe - vocals
- Liz Mitchell - vocals, rap
- Sharon Steven - backing vocals
- Patty Onoyewenjo - backing vocals
- Frank Farian - backing vocals

== Sources ==
- http://www.rateyourmusic.com/artist/boneym
