= Singalongs (album) =

2007 album by Melo-M

Studio album by Melo-M
- Released: 2007
- Recorded: Chellout Studios; Riga, Latvia
- Genre: Cello rock
- Length: 43:09
- Label: Platforma Records
- Producer: Kārlis Auzāns

Melo-M chronology
Melo-M	Singalongs	Around the World

Singalongs is the second studio album released by Latvian instrumental cello rock trio Melo-M. The album is produced by trio member Kārlis Auzāns and recorded 2007 at Chellout Studios in Riga, Latvia. The album consists of 11 cover version tracks.

== Personnel ==
- Kārlis Auzāns (alias Charlie Lee) - Cello, vocals (track 1, 3 and 6).
- Valters Pūce (alias Walis Shmuls) - Cello.
- Antons Trocjuks (alias Tonny Trolly) - Cello.
- Vilnis Krieviņš - Drums (track 1, 2, 4 to 11.
- Andris Buikis - Drums (track 3).

== Track listing ==
No.	Title	Length
1.	"Daddy Cool" (featuring Maizie Williams)	3:43
2.	"Come Together"	3:18
3.	"Ghostbusters" (featuring Intars Busulis)	2:27
4.	"Take On Me"	3:30
5.	"I Will Survive"	3:47
6.	"99 Red Balloons"	3:05
7.	"Ring of Fire"	3:13
8.	"Mission Impossible"	3:27
9.	"Those Were the Days"	4:13
10.	"Svefn-g-englar"	8:46
11.	"Даваи Женись" (featuring Raimonds Pauls (piano), Jay Stever and Laima Vaikule (vocals))	3:40
Total length:		43:09
