= The Best of 10 Years – 32 Superhits =

1986 compilation album by Boney M

The Best of 10 Years - 32 Superhits

Remix album by Boney M.
- Released: January 1986
- Recorded: 1976–1986
- Genre: R&B, reggae, Euro disco
- Length: 46:24
- Label: Hansa Records (FRG); Stylus Records (UK)
- Producer: Frank Farian

Boney M. chronology
Eye Dance (1985)	The Best of 10 Years - 32 Superhits (1986)	The 20 Greatest Christmas Songs (1986)

Alternative cover
- UK edition

Professional ratings
Review scores
Source	Rating
Allmusic	link

In the Mix

Greatest hits album by Boney M.
- Released: November 7, 2008

Boney M. chronology
The Complete Boney M. (2008)	In the Mix (2008)	The Magic of Boney M. – The Danish Collection (2008)

The Best of 10 Years – 32 Superhits also known as 32 Superhits - Non-Stop Digital Remix is a remix album by Boney M. released in 1986.

In 1981 producer Frank Farian created a thirteen-minute medley in the style of Stars on 45 called "6 Years of Boney M. Hits (Boney M. on 45)" which was issued as both A- and B-side singles in certain territories - in the UK the medley was the B-side of Boonoonoonoos 12" single "We Kill The World (Don't Kill The World)", in Germany the edited 7" version appeared as the B-side of Christmas Album single "Little Drummer Boy" and the longer version as a separate A-side 12" release in early 1982.

Five years later, shortly after the unsuccessful Eye Dance project, when Boney M. were celebrating their first decade as a group - although it in reality was dissolved at the time - Farian took the non-stop medley idea one step further and extended the medley to a thirty-two track, forty-six minutes full-length album of Boney M's greatest hits with additional percussive and synthesized overdubs.

The Best of 10 Years - 32 Superhits reached #3 on the German albums chart.

== In the Mix ==
In 2008, Sony-BMG re-issued the album with a new cover and title as "In the Mix".

== Track listing ==
Side A

1. "Daddy Cool" (Farian, Reyam) - 1:43
2. "Sunny" (Bobby Hebb) - 1:37
3. "Ma Baker" (Farian, Jay, Reyam) - 1:53
4. "Belfast" (Hillsbury, Deutscher, Menke) - 1:13
5. "Rasputin" (Farian, Jay, Reyam) - 1:34
6. "Painter Man" (Phillips, Pickett) - 1:40
7. "Children of Paradise" (Farian, Jay, Reyam) - 1:36
8. "Gotta Go Home" (Farian, Jay, Klinkhammer) - 1:45
9. "Dreadlock Holiday" (Graham Gouldman, Eric Stewart) - 1:22
10. "Felicidad (Margherita)" (Conz, Massara) - 1:40
11. "Barbarella Fortuneteller" (Davis, Farian, Kawohl) - 1:40
12. "Gadda-Da-Vida" (Doug Ingle) - 1:43
13. "Got Cha Loco" (Applegate, Baierl, Farian, Reyam) - 1:25
14. "Todos Buenos" (Applegate, Farian) - 1:50

Side B

1. "No Woman, No Cry" (Ford, Bob Marley) - 1:42
2. "Brown Girl in the Ring" (Farian) - 1:41
3. "B.M. à GoGo" - 5:52 (Arr. Farian)
  - "New York City"
  - "Gloria Can You Waddle"
  - "Baby Do You Wanna Bump"
  - "He Was a Steppenwolf"
  - "Bye Bye Bluebird"
  - "Nightflight to Venus"
4. "Rivers of Babylon" (Farian, Reyam) - 1:45
5. "El Lute" (Farian, Jay, Klinkhammer, Kolonovits) - 1:43
6. "The Calendar Song (January, February, March...)" (Farian) - 1:50
7. "Bang Bang Lulu" (Farian) - 1:32
8. "Hooray! Hooray! It's a Holi-Holiday" (Farian) - 0:59
9. "Kalimba De Luna" (Davis, Farian, Kawohl) - 1:38
10. "My Cherie Amour" (Cosby, Moy, Stevie Wonder) - 1:32
11. "I Feel Good" (Bischof, Farian) - 1:21
12. "Young, Free and Single" (Applegate, Farian, Reyam) - 1:42
13. "Happy Song" (Abacab, Bacciocchi, Spagna) - 1:48

== Personnel ==
- Liz Mitchell - lead vocals, backing vocals
- Marcia Barrett - lead vocal "Belfast", backing vocals
- Frank Farian - lead vocals, backing vocals
- Reggie Tsiboe - lead vocals, backing vocals
- Bobby Farrell - vocals (rap) on track Happy Song and vocoder (vocals) on Young, Free and Single

== Production ==
- Frank Farian - producer

== Charts ==
Chart (1986)	Peak position
German Albums (Offizielle Top 100)	2
UK Albums (OCC)	35

== Release history ==
- 1986 Germany: CD Hansa 610 550-222
- 1986 Germany: LP Hansa 207 500-501
- 1986 UK: Stylus SMR 621

As "In the Mix"

- 2008 EU: Sony-BMG 88697-39671-2

== Single releases ==
Germany
7"

- "Daddy Cool (Anniversary Recording '86)" - 5:18 / "B.M.A.G.O." - 4:10 (Hansa Records 107 994-100, 1986)

12"

- "Daddy Cool (Anniversary Recording '86)" Special Club Mix - 7:45 / Special Club Dub - 6:43 / "B.M.A.G.O." - 3:00 Hansa 607 994-213, 1986)

== Sources and external links ==
- Rate Your Music, detailed discography
- Discogs.com, detailed discography
- Allmusic, biography, discography etc.
