= The Carnival Is Over =

1965 single by the Seekers

- Netherlands single picture sleeve

Single by the Seekers
- B-side: "We Shall Not Be Moved"
- Released: 1965
- Genre: Folk rock, baroque pop
- Length: 3:06
- Label: Columbia
- Composer: from Russian folk music
- Lyricist: Tom Springfield
- Producer: Tom Springfield

The Seekers singles chronology
"A World of Our Own" (1965)	"The Carnival Is Over" (1965)	"Someday One Day" (1966)

Official audio
- "The Carnival Is Over (Stereo) (2009 Remaster)" on YouTube

"The Carnival Is Over" is a song written by Tom Springfield, for the Australian folk pop group the Seekers. It is based on a Russian folk song from about 1883, adapted with original English-language lyrics. The song became the Seekers' signature recording, and the band customarily closed their concerts, saying "Goodbye" to the audience with it ever since its success in late 1965.

The single spent three weeks at No. 1 in the UK Singles Chart in November and December 1965. At its 1965 sales peak, the single was selling 93,000 copies per day in the UK with total sales of at least 1.41 million in the UK alone. It stopped The Who from getting to No. 1 with "My Generation".

The song also topped the Australian Charts for six weeks, from 4 December 1965, and reached No. 1 in the Irish Singles Chart for two weeks.

== The music ==
"The Carnival is Over" was the third hit single written for the Seekers by Tom Springfield, following the success of "I'll Never Find Another You" (1964) and "A World of Our Own" (1965).

=== Stenka Razin ===
Volga, Volga mat' rodnaya
The original Russian folksong performed by Feodor Chaliapin

The main tune of "The Carnival is Over" is adapted from a Russian song about the Cossack ataman Stenka Razin which became popular in Russia in the 1890s. The original poem of "Stenka Razin" was written in 1883 by the poet and Povolzhye region ethnographer Dmitry Sadovnikov. The text of this poem, with minor changes, was set to the music of a popular Russian folk melody by an unknown author.

Score:

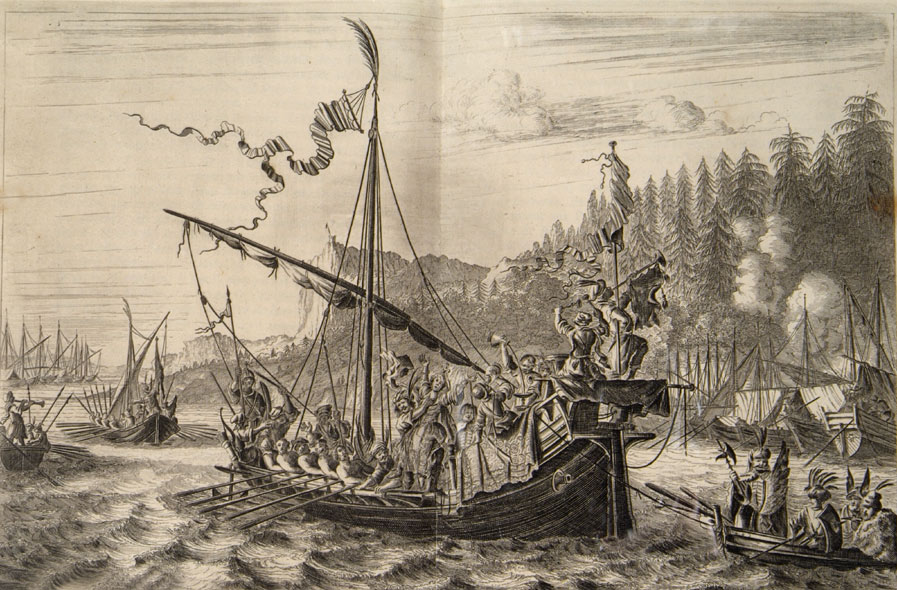
Razin throws his Persian lover overboard (illustration in a book by Jean Struys (1681))

The song gave the title to the famous 1938 Soviet musical comedy Volga-Volga. It was performed by the Osipov State Russian Folk Orchestra (balalaikas and domras) during their 1967 tour of Australia. It is played to symbolic effect by the band in a cafe in the 1988 film The Unbearable Lightness of Being, after Soviet tanks have crushed the Prague Spring.

In the 1950s, American folk singer Pete Seeger wrote an English language version of "Stenka Razin" called "River of My People". The song was included in his album Love Songs for Friends and Foes (1956). The lyrics were not a translation of the Russian lyrics, but were written by Seeger, while maintaining the motif of the river.

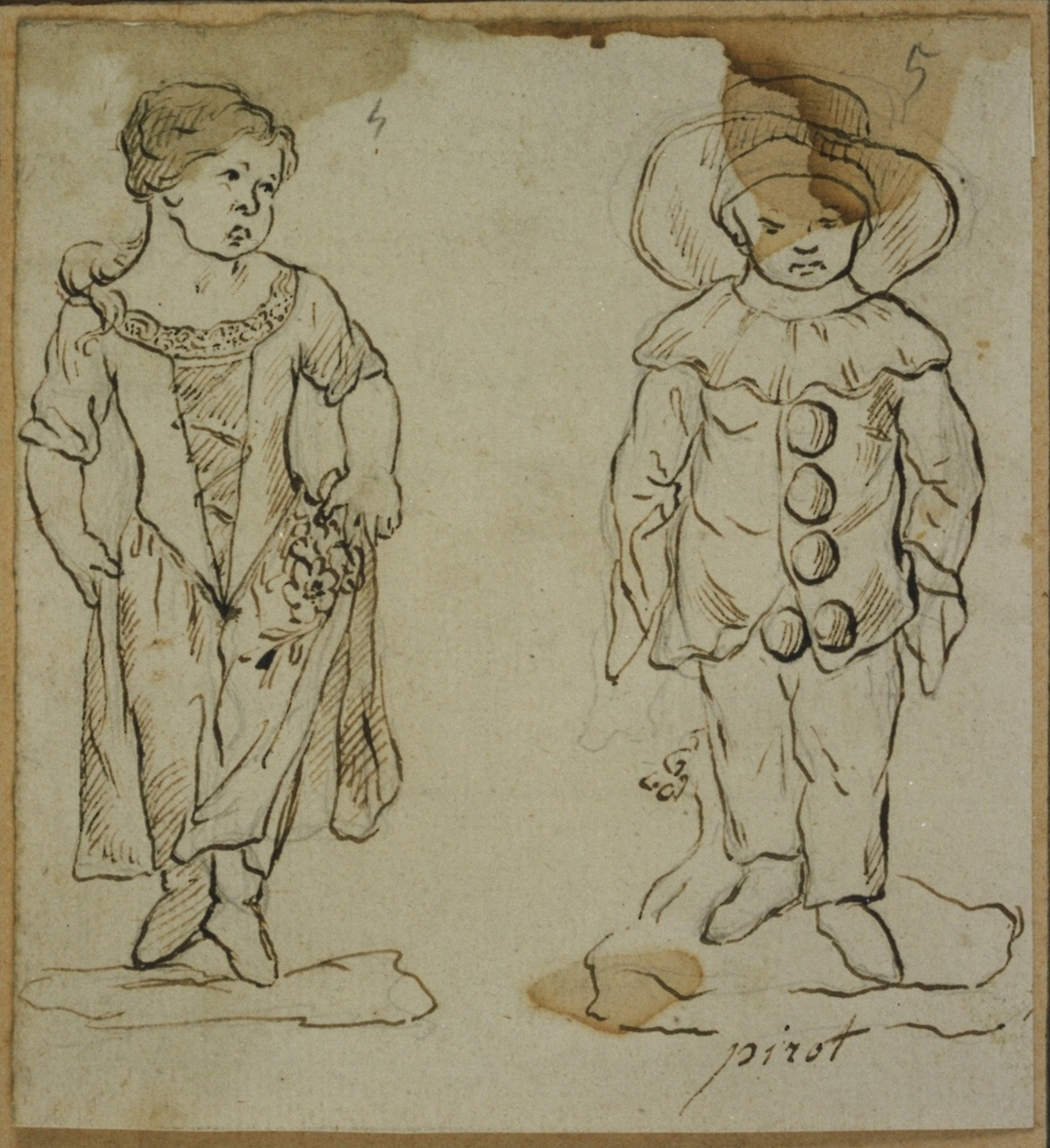
Pierrot and Columbine

== The Seekers version ==
Tom Springfield was introduced to the song "Stenka Razin" at the Joint Services School for Linguists during his National Service from 1952 to 1954. The school was known as “the Russian course”, and its purpose was to train conscripts in intelligence techniques and provide language training, principally in Russian. Springfield joined the school's Russian choir, and they sang "Stenka Razin" in Russian as part of the course.

Springfield adapted the folk song melody in two significant ways. He altered the time signature from 3/4 to 4/4, and he added a chorus, allowing him to expand the song structure to AABABA from the simple AAA structure of the original. His decision to base his third song for the Seekers on the haunting Russian melody proved to be "a gold mine".

Early in 1965, Springfield travelled to Brazil and witnessed the Carnival in Rio. That provided the basis for his new lyrics, including those in the chorus which compare the couple in the song to the perpetually unhappy Commedia dell'arte characters: "But the joys of love are fleeting / For Pierrot and Columbine." The male partner has possibly been drafted, ending their "carnival". The "harbour light" is calling him away as they say goodbye. However, rather than the tragic ending of "Stenka Razin", there is hope that the partner will return. Whatever happens, she says "I will love you 'til I die."

== Boney M. version ==
"The Carnival Is Over"
- Germany single picture sleeve

Single by Boney M.
- A-side: "Going Back West" (double A-side)
- Released: June 1982
- Recorded: 1982
- Genre: Pop; Euro disco
- Length: 4:48
- Label: Hansa (Germany)
- Composer: Tom Springfield from Russian folk song
- Lyricist: Tom Springfield
- Producer: Frank Farian

Boney M. singles chronology
"6 Years of Boney M. Hits" (1982)	"The Carnival Is Over" / "Going Back West" (1982)	"Zion's Daughter" (1982)

Music video
- "Boney M. - The Carnival Is Over (Official Video)" on YouTube

The German band Boney M. released their cover version of the Seekers' song in 1982 under the title "The Carnival Is Over (Goodbye True Lover)". The song featured Liz Mitchell on lead vocal, and included a new original verse by producer Frank Farian and lyricist Catherine Courage to introduce Reggie Tsiboe as a vocalist following the departure of Bobby Farrell from the band. Despite reaching No.11 in the Swiss charts, the single was widely considered Boney M.'s first flop.

Farian attempted to remedy this failure by producing a number of shorter versions, culminating in a release for the Japanese market in which Tsiboe's interpolated verse was omitted. This can be found on the 2001 album Their Most Beautiful Ballads, but it had no more success than previous versions.

== Nick Cave version ==
Nick Cave & the Bad Seeds covered the Seekers' version of "The Carnival is Over" on their 1986 album Kicking Against The Pricks. This was the third album released by the Australian rock band. Remarking on the song selection on the album, Cave said:

Some songs had just kind of haunted my childhood, like "The Carnival is Over", which I always loved.

== Dean & Britta version ==
Dean & Britta duo of Dean Wareham and Britta Phillips covered the Seekers' version of "The Carnival is Over" on their 2020 album Quarantine Tapes during the pandemic. Dean Wareham said:

Yeah, those recordings sound intimate, obviously they are more stripped down, sometimes just voices, acoustic guitar and bass guitar so the vocals are more front and centre—I really love “He Dines out on Death” by Cristina Monet Zilkha and “The Carnival is Over” by The Seekers—two songs we tried to record ten years ago but never finished, and then the titles jumped out at me as being especially relevant.
