= Maizie Williams =

British model and singer (born 1951)

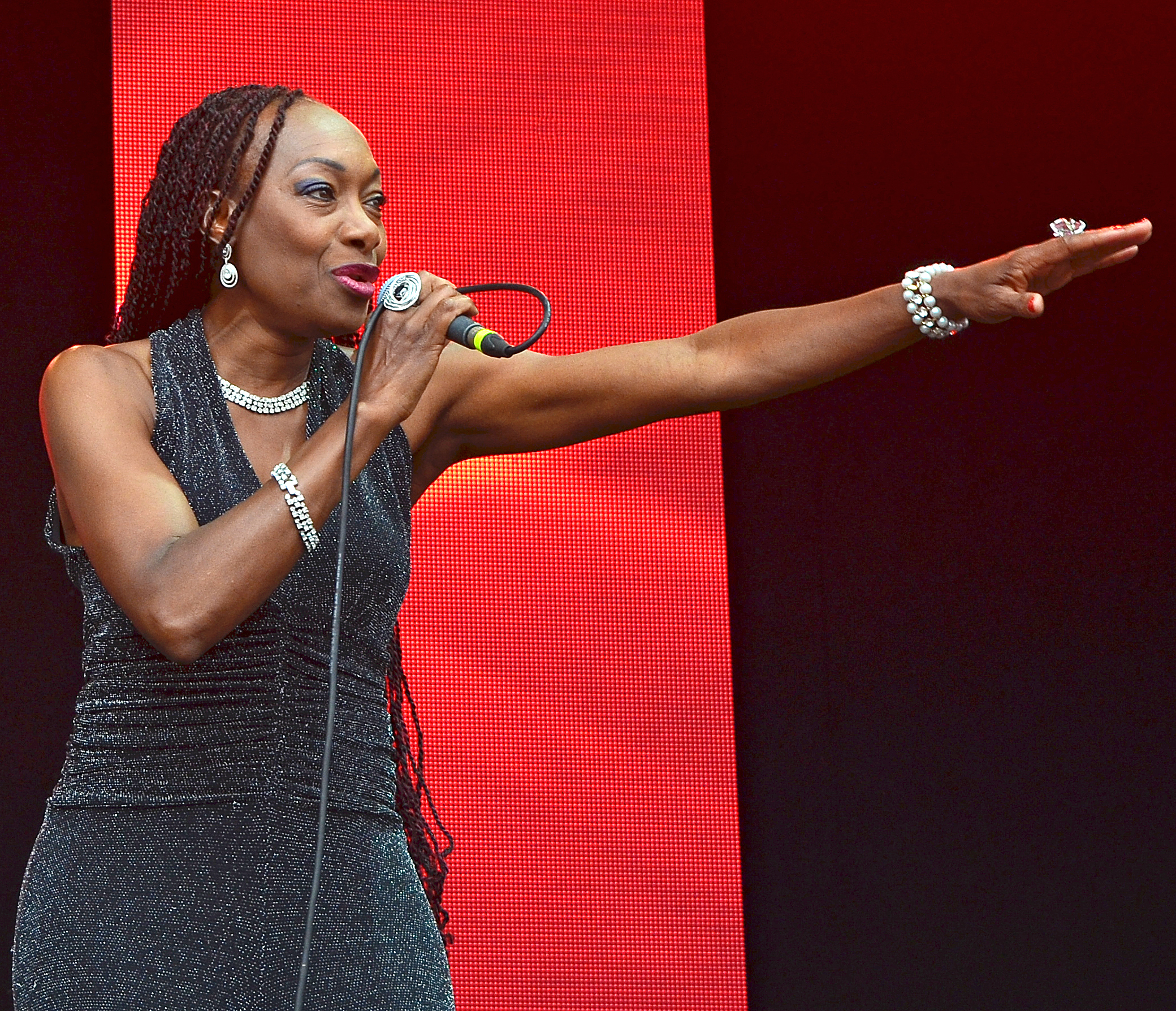
- Williams performing in 2014

Background information
- Born: Maizie Ursula Williams; 25 March 1951 (age 75); Brades, Montserrat
- Origin: Birmingham, England
- Genres: R&B, eurodisco, reggae
- Occupations: Model; dancer; singer
- Years active: 1973–present
- Labels: Hansa Records, Sony-BMG
- Formerly of: Boney M.

Maizie Ursula Williams (born 25 March 1951) is a British model, dancer and singer who became one of the original members of the successful 1970s disco music group Boney M. Though she did not sing on the studio recordings of their songs, she did perform live and subsequently established an independent career as a singer.

== Early years ==
Born in Montserrat in the West Indies, Williams, along with her siblings, moved to the United Kingdom in the 1960s, and was brought up in Birmingham, England. Williams began working as a model, eventually gaining the title Miss Black Beautiful in a contest in 1973. After this initial success she went on to front her own band, Black Beautiful People. She later moved to West Germany with her friend Sheyla Bonnick. One day in 1975, while at a restaurant, the two were approached by an agent who asked if they were interested in joining a new pop group called Boney M. "She asked if we could sing. Well, you don't say no, do you," Williams later recalled in an interview. She had previously been singing with a local band back in England but had been told off by her brother Billy: "You have a terrible voice. Better keep working as a walking clothes-hanger."

It turned out that it was not important if Williams could sing or not, since the job was to dance and mime to a disco song called "Baby Do You Wanna Bump" that producer Frank Farian had recorded the vocals for, but was unable to promote himself since he had a career as a schlager singer in his own name. Williams and Bonnick teamed up with two other performers identified only as "Nathalie" and "Mike". They did a discothèque tour and a few TV performances over the next months. However, no footage has ever surfaced of the earlier Boney M lineup. Nathalie left the group and was replaced by Claudja Barry. Sheyla then decided that lip-synching was not for her and also left, hoping to achieve a solo career. Mike left as well, and the two were replaced by new members Marcia Barrett and Bobby Farrell. When Claudja went the same way as Sheyla, Liz Mitchell took her place, and finally the pieces fell together. Boney M. were assembled as a real group and ready to do a follow-up to "Baby Do You Wanna Bump". The classic Boney M. lineup as Bobby Farrell, Maizie Williams and Marcia Barrett performing "Baby Do You Wanna Bump" on the Dutch music show Top Pop was first recorded on 2 January 1976. Liz Mitchell joined the group later.

== Boney M. ==
Both Liz Mitchell and Marcia Barrett were singers and would participate in the group's recordings together with producer Frank Farian who did the deep male voice. The threesome recorded the follow-up single "Daddy Cool" which soon became a worldwide hit and launched the group's phenomenal career, with numerous hit singles and albums over the next decade. Williams and Bobby Farrell did not sing on the records. This did not create a scandal, firstly as this practice had become commonplace within the disco genre during the late 1970s, and the fact as both Williams and Farrell sang on live performances.

Williams remained with the group until their official break-up in 1990. In 1994, she did what her former colleagues Liz Mitchell and Bobby Farrell had also done, which was to form her own Boney M group. Called "Boney M featuring Maizie Williams", the group also featured Sheyla Bonnick from the short-lived original 1975 line-up. In this version of Boney M, Williams would finally get her chance to front as lead singer during the group's rendition of hits such as "Brown Girl in the Ring", "Hooray! Hooray! It's a Holi-Holiday", "Sunny", and "Daddy Cool".

== Vocal controversy ==
It is stated on Williams' official site that "it's no secret that although she sang in the studio Williams' less dominant voice appears to have been mostly excluded from many of the recordings, with the exception of some backing vocals, for reasons only the producer knew at the time". However, the inner sleeve of the group's Oceans of Fantasy 1979 LP lists only Farian, Mitchell and Barrett in the track-by-track vocal credits. Williams did record a minor part for the group's "That's Boonoonoonoos / Train to Skaville", which was also broadcast in the 1981 TV special Ein Sound geht um die Welt ("A Sound Goes Around the World"), but in the final mix released on record, the part was eventually re-recorded by Liz Mitchell.

Williams initiated a court case against Boney M.'s producer Frank Farian and Sony/BMG concerning her rights to perform under the name "Boney M". Farian was promoting Mitchell's group as the authentic continuation of Boney M. The court heard that "she had not sung on any of the band's recordings". On 16 February 2009, Williams had judgement in the case, that Farian has to account to her for pay on all record sales and future sales.

== Present ==
Besides still touring the world, Williams released her first solo record in December 2006, Call Upon Jesus, including the download single "Praise Be Unto Him". In February 2007, she released her own dance version of the Boney M. hit "Sunny". In June, she starred as the featured vocalist on Latvian group Melo-M's version of "Daddy Cool" which hit the No. 1 spot in the LMK charts in the last week of August.

In September 2011, a Dutch press release was issued regarding a tribute single that has been written by Williams, together with Dutch songwriters Eddie Middle-Line and Björn de Water. The song and video for "Josephine Baker" (Eddie Middle-Line Mix) had a worldwide release.
