= Mega Mix (1992 Boney M. song) =

Single by Boney M.

from the album Gold – 20 Super Hits
- Released: December 1992
- Recorded: 1992
- Genre: Pop
- Label: Hansa Records FRG
- Songwriters: Farian; Reyam; Jay; Hebb
- Producer: Frank Farian

Boney M. singles chronology
"Christmas Mega Mix" (1992)	"Mega Mix" (1992)	"Brown Girl in the Ring (Remix)" (1993)

Audio video
- "Mega Mix" on YouTube

"Mega Mix" is a song by German band Boney M., released in December 1992 by Hansa Records. It returned the group to the UK Top 10 for the first time since 1979, peaking at number seven, and was also a hit single in the rest of Europe and launched a Boney M. revival with the subsequent compilation album Gold – 20 Super Hits (in the UK: The Greatest Hits). The German 12" and CD single included a new remix of the 1983 recording "I Need a Babysitter" (previously only released in Spain and Portugal) while the UK edition was backed by the new remix of the group's 1978 chart-topper "Mary's Boy Child / Oh My Lord". While the original members were no longer together, lead singer Liz Mitchell's line-up with Carol Grey, Patricia Foster and Curt Dee Daran did the promotion for the single and album. The promotion video however showed old imagery of the well known Boney M. edition.

== Single releases ==
Germany
7"

- "Megamix" - 3:51 / "Bang Bang Lulu" (Farian) - 3:01 (BMG / MCI 74321 12606 7, 1992)

12"

- "Mega Mix" (Long Version) - 6:12 / "Babysitter" (Remix) (Allegue, Mahjun, Farian, Courage) - 3:48 / "Mega Mix" (Radio Version) - 3:51 / "Bang Bang Lulu" - 3:01 (BMG / MCI 74321 12606 1, 1992)

CD

- 1. "Mega Mix" (Radio Version) - 3:51 / 2. "Mega Mix" (Long Version) - 6:12 / 3. "Bang Bang Lulu" - 3:01 / 4. "Babysitter" (Remix) - 3:48 (BMG / MCI 74321 12606 2, 1992)

UK
7"

- "Megamix" - 3:51 / "Mary's Boy Child / Oh My Lord" (Remix '92) (Hairston, Lorin, Farian, Jay) - 3:58 (Arista 74321 12512 7)

12"

- "Megamix" (Long Version) - 6:12 / "Mary's Boy Child / Oh My Lord" (Remix '92) - 3:58 / "Megamix" (Radio Version) - 3:51 (Arista 74321 12512 1)

CD

- "Megamix" (Radio Version) - 3:51 / "Mary's Boy Child / Oh My Lord" (Remix '92) - 3:58 / "Megamix" (Long Version) - 6:12 (Arista 74321 12512 2)

== Charts ==
Chart (1992–1993)	Peak position
Australia (ARIA)	70
Austria (Ö3 Austria Top 40)	11
Belgium (Ultratop 50 Flanders)	41
Germany (GfK)	26
Ireland (IRMA)	3
Netherlands (Dutch Top 40)	13
Netherlands (Single Top 100)	12
New Zealand (Recorded Music NZ)	49
UK Singles (OCC)	7
UK Airplay (Music Week)	45

== Sources ==
- http://www.rateyourmusic.com/artist/boneym%5B%5D
