= The Cheeky Girls =

Romanian singing duo

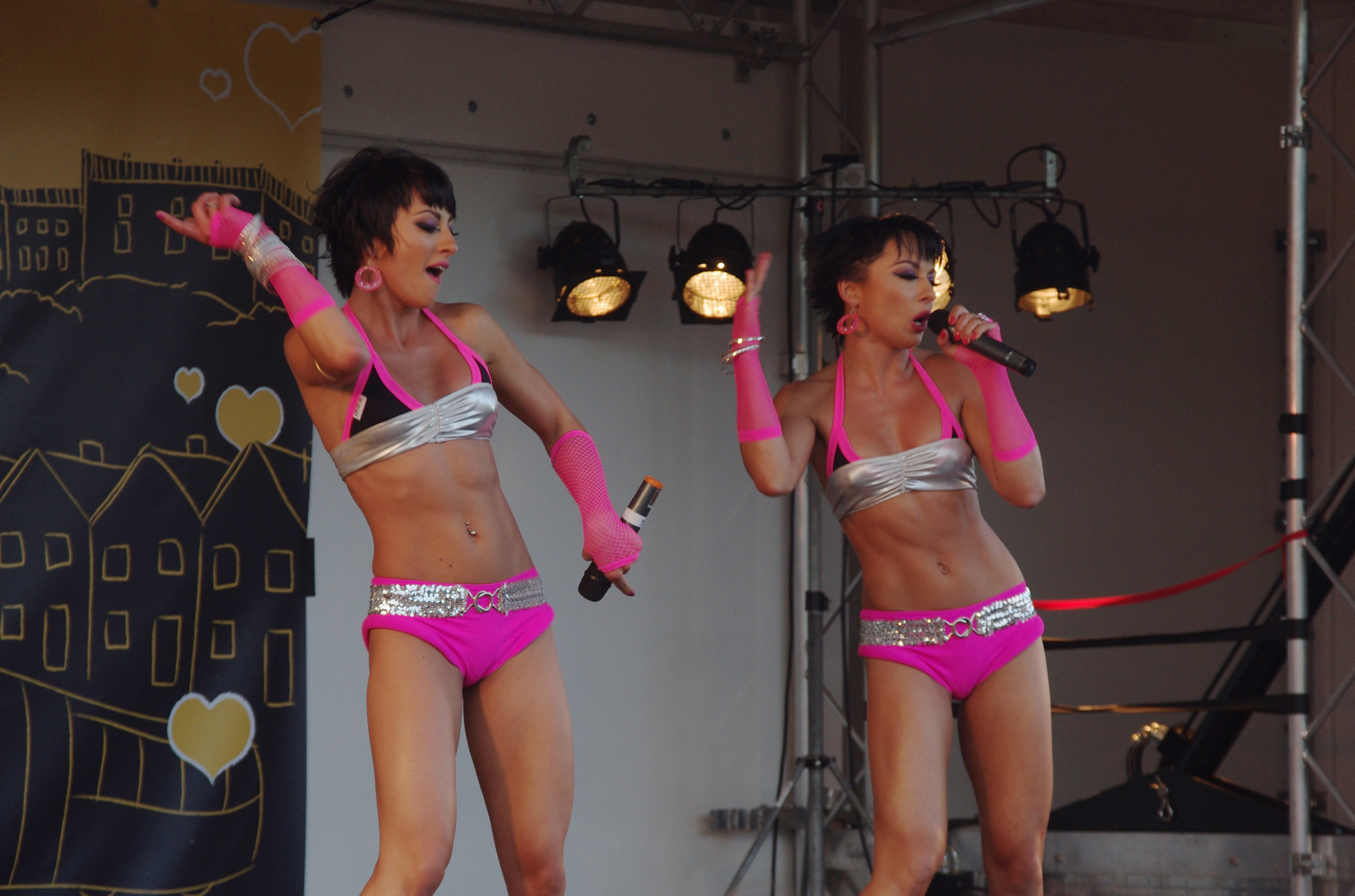
- The Cheeky Girls performing at Nottingham Pride 2010

Background information
- Born: Cluj-Napoca, Transylvania, Romania
- Genres: Pop; dance; Europop; Eurodance
- Years active: 2002–present
- Labels: Multiply (2002–2004); XBN (2004–2006); GMI Music (2006–present)
- Members: Gabriela Irimia; Monica Irimia

The Cheeky Girls are a Romanian singing duo consisting of identical twin sisters Gabriela and Monica Irimia. After appearing as auditionees on Popstars: The Rivals, they achieved success in the UK charts with four top 10 hits between 2002 and 2004. They are best known for their debut single, "Cheeky Song (Touch My Bum)", which has sold more than 1.2 million units internationally. The Cheeky Girls released their debut studio album, PartyTime, in 2003 which reached number 14 in the UK Albums Chart.

== Biography ==
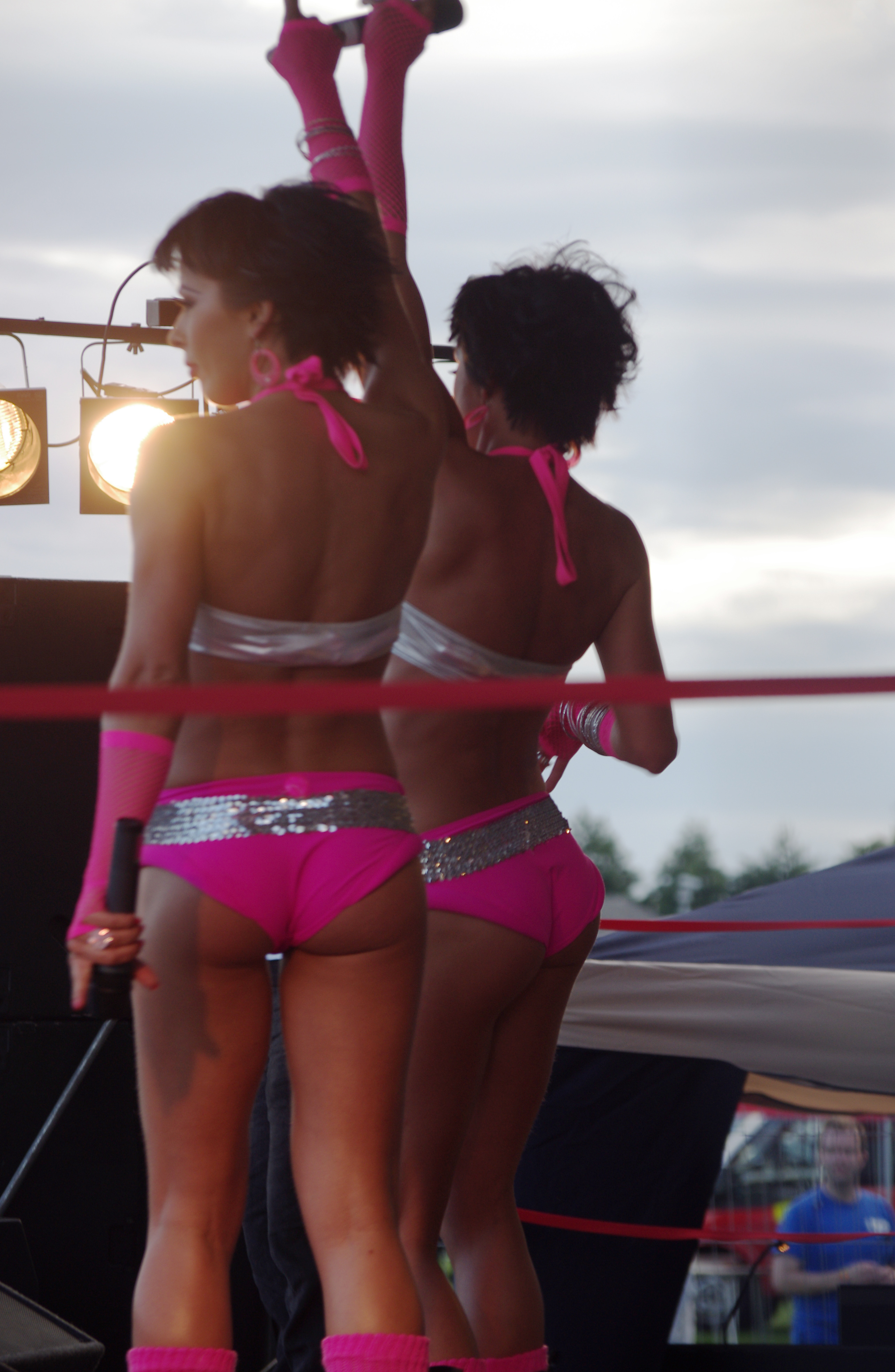
The Cheeky Girls performing at Nottingham Pride 2010

Gabriela and Monica were born to Doru and Margit Irimia. Their early life in Romania consisted of studying gymnastics and ballet and touring with the Hungarian State Opera. Moving to the United Kingdom with their mother in 2002, the girls shot to fame as the Cheeky Girls after auditioning on two British TV shows, Channel 4's Model Behaviour and more importantly Popstars: The Rivals. Following two appearances on the show with their audition, which had judges Pete Waterman and Louis Walsh not knowing what to say – Waterman was later quoted as saying they were the worst act ever – various record companies approached the Granada Press Office. The Press Office contacted Paul Holland at Granada Ventures, who was able to secure them a deal with Multiply Records, a subsidiary of Telstar Records. "Cheeky Song (Touch My Bum)" was swiftly recorded and released in the first week in December. Entering the chart at number two, the single remained in the top five for five consecutive weeks, four of them at number two.

This was quickly followed up with two more top three hits, "Take Your Shoes Off" and "(Hooray, Hooray!) It's a Cheeky Holiday!". Their style of music is primarily disco-pop, aimed at the pre-teen market. Most of their songs are written by their mother, who also acts as their manager.

On 4 August 2006, the Evening Standard reported that the Cheeky Girls were "at rock bottom" and facing bankruptcy action in court owing to not having been paid by their now-defunct record label, Telstar Records. The article said that the women owed £4,500 in unpaid taxes, along with other bills, and that Telstar owed them £2.2 million. Later, it was reported that they owed £130,000 in total.

In September 2009, the act released their Cheeky Girls make-up range, aimed at the young teen market.

On 7 March 2013, the women appeared on the This Week BBC TV programme discussing the subject of Romanian immigration to the UK with host Andrew Neil. This followed a short video report by Monica talking about British fears of an invasion of benefit-seekers from their homeland. They previously appeared on the show on 10 July 2008.

== Private lives ==
In December 2006, it was revealed by the tabloids that former Liberal Democrat MP Lembit Öpik had broken up with long-time fiancée, ITV weather presenter Siân Lloyd, and was now romantically involved with Gabriela. Öpik "passed documentation on to the singers' constituency MP and spoke to a Home Office minister," when the Irimias were facing deportation to Romania. The couple announced their engagement in April 2008 after Öpik proposed in Rome, but the engagement was short-lived and a break-up was announced three months later. In 2016, Monica married her fiancé of four years, Shaun Taylor, who works as a building contractor.

== Discography ==
=== Albums ===
Year	Title	Peak chart positions	Certifications	Sales
Year	Title	UK	Certifications	Sales
2003	PartyTime: Debut studio album; Released: 11 August 2003; Label: Multiply Records	14	UK: Silver	UK: 60,000+
2007	In My Mind (Is a Different World – A Cheeky One): Second studio album; Released: 2007; Label: GMI Music	—		

=== Singles ===
Year	Title	Peak chart positions									Album
Year	Title	UK	IRE	AUS	FRA	GER	JPN	HUN	TUR	CHN	Album
2002	"Cheeky Song (Touch My Bum)"	2	12	59	19	52	6	12	15	6	PartyTime
2003	"Take Your Shoes Off"	3	13	—	—	—	4	7	13	3	PartyTime
2003	"(Hooray, Hooray!) It's a Cheeky Holiday!"	3	5	—	—	-	11	7	31	10	PartyTime
2003	"Have a Cheeky Christmas"	10	46	—	—	-	27	—	37	15	PartyTime
2004	"Cheeky Flamenco"	29	31	—	—	—	85	—	70	50	In My Mind (Is a Different World – A Cheeky One)
2004	"Boys and Girls (Xmas Time Love)"	50	80	—	—	—	—	—	118	107	In My Mind (Is a Different World – A Cheeky One)
2005	"Farmyard Hokey"	—	—	—	—	-	—	56	—		In My Mind (Is a Different World – A Cheeky One)
2022	"Lets Have Fun"	—	—	—	—	-	—	—	—	—	Non-Album Single
2022	"I’m In Touch With Heaven"	—	—	—	—	-	—	—	—	—	Non-Album Single
2022	"Run Your Engine Baby"	—	—	—	—	-	—	—	—	—	Non-Album Single

== See also ==
- List of music released by Romanian artists that has charted in major music markets
