= Have a Cheeky Christmas =

2003 single by the Cheeky Girls

Single by the Cheeky Girls
- Released: 8 December 2003
- Length: 3:09
- Label: Multiply
- Songwriters: Grete Irimia-Semal, the Cheeky Boyz
- Producer: The Cheeky Boyz

The Cheeky Girls singles chronology
"Hooray Hooray (It's a Cheeky Holiday)" (2003)	"Have a Cheeky Christmas" (2003)	"Cheeky Flamenco" (2004)

Music video
- "Have a Cheeky Christmas" on YouTube

"Have a Cheeky Christmas" is a song by Romanian pop duo the Cheeky Girls. It was released as a single on 8 December 2003 in the United Kingdom. The single peaked at number 10 on the UK Singles Chart and number 32 on the Irish Singles Chart.

== Track listings ==
UK CD1

1. "Have a Cheeky Christmas" (radio edit)
2. "Cheeky Song (Touch My Bum)" (Christmas mix)
3. "Have a Cheeky Christmas" (karaoke mix)
4. "Have a Cheeky Christmas" (video)

UK CD2

1. "Have a Cheeky Christmas" (radio edit)
2. "Salsa in the Disco"

== Charts ==
=== Weekly charts ===
Chart (2003)	Peak position
Ireland (IRMA)	32
Scotland Singles (OCC)	11
UK Singles (OCC)	10

=== Year-end charts ===
Chart (2003)	Position
UK Singles (OCC)	179

== See also ==
- List of music released by Romanian artists that has charted in major music markets
