= Hooray! Hooray! It's a Holi-Holiday =

1979 single by Boney M.

Single by Boney M.
- Released: 26 March 1979
- Length: 3:56
- Label: Hansa
- Songwriters: Frank Farian, Fred Jay
- Producer: Frank Farian

Boney M. singles chronology
"Painter Man" (1979)	"Hooray! Hooray! It's a Holi-Holiday" (1979)	"El Lute / Gotta Go Home" (1979)

Audio video
- "Hooray! Hooray! It's A Holi- Holiday" on YouTube

"Hooray! Hooray! It's a Holi-Holiday" is a song by German Euro disco band Boney M., released in 1979 as an adaptation of the song, "Polly Wolly Doodle". Despite breaking their row of seven consecutive German number-one singles, peaking at number four, the single was a hit all over Europe, peaking at number three in the United Kingdom. The song and its B-side, "Ribbons of Blue", were taken from the movie Disco Fever. "Ribbons of Blue" has a strong country feel with the addition of a pedal steel guitar. Even though the single cover announced the arrival of the next Boney M. album, Oceans of Fantasy, it would still be another six months before the album was released, and of the two songs, only "Ribbons of Blue" (penned by the group's drummer, Keith Forsey) was included and just in a one- or two-minute edit, depending on the pressing.

== Single ==
Unlike other Boney M. singles, there appears to be no different mixes. In Germany, this was the first single to picture a specially designed label with a star-spangled Boney M. logo on a blue background. In the UK, the single was released in a picture sleeve – it was also pressed on a picture disc and a 12-inch clear yellow vinyl with card picture cover insert.

== Reception ==
Smash Hits said, "If a knees-up in a holiday camp is your idea of a good time, then you might possibly - just possibly - enjoy this excruciatingly dreadful singalongaboney. But make no mistake, whether you love it or hate it, you will hear it."

== Track listings ==
German 7" single (Hansa Int. 100 444–100)

- "Hooray! Hooray! It's a Holi-Holiday" (3:56) / "Ribbons of Blue" (4:02)

UK 7" single (Atlantic K 11279 / Picture disc K 11279P)

- "Hooray! Hooray! It's a Holi-Holiday" (3:56) / "Ribbons of Blue" (4:02)

UK 12" single

- "Hooray! Hooray! It's a Holi-Holiday" (3:56) / "Ribbons of Blue" (4:02) (Atlantic K 11279T)

== Chart positions ==
Chart (1979)	Peak position
Argentina (CAPIF)	5
Ireland (IRMA)	5
Germany (Gfk)	4
Netherlands (Dutch Top 40)	1
Netherlands (Dutch Single Top 100)	1
Spain (Superventas Ser)	13
United Kingdom (OCC)	3

== Certifications ==
Region	Certification	Certified units/sales
Netherlands (NVPI)	Gold	100,000^{^}
United Kingdom (BPI)	Silver	250,000^{^}
^{^} Shipments figures based on certification alone.

== "Hooray! Hooray! (Caribbean Night Fever)" ==
"Hooray! Hooray! (Caribbean Night Fever)"

Single by Boney M.

from the album 20th Century Hits
- Released: 8 November 1999
- Label: BMG (FRG)
- Songwriters: F. Farian, F. Jay, Bob Marley
- Producer: Frank Farian

Boney M. singles chronology
"Daddy Cool '99" (1999)	"Hooray! Hooray! (Caribbean Night Fever)" (1999)	"Sunny (Remix)" (2000)

"Hooray! Hooray! (Caribbean Night Fever)" is a double A-side Boney M. single from 1999 with a new remix of their 1979 hit "Hooray! Hooray! It's a Holi-Holiday" and a megamix of their hits "Brown Girl in the Ring", "Hooray! Hooray! It's a Holi-Holiday" and "No Woman No Cry", all taken from their remix album 20th Century Hits, released at the same time. The single fared poorly, peaking at just No. 79 on the German charts and number 80 on the Swiss chart. After producer Frank Farian had dropped the idea of launching an all-new Boney M. line-up with young people, he announced that original lead singer Liz Mitchell and her Boney M. line-up would promote the album before dropping this idea again. Consequently, the accompanying video featured a cartoon movie of the original group. The 12" single featured "Tropical" and "Carnival" mixes, both unavailable on CD.

=== Track listings ===
CD

- Boney M. 2000: "Hooray! Hooray! (Caribbean Night Fever)" (BMG 74321 71064 2, 1999)
1. "Caribbean Night Fever – Megamix" (radio edit) – 3:55
2. "Hooray! Hooray! It's a Holi-Holiday" (radio edit) – 3:30
3. "Caribbean Night Fever" (extended version) – 5:28
4. "Hooray! Hooray! It's a Holi-Holiday" (extended version) – 4:26
5. "Brown Girl in the Ring" (remix) – 4:01

12-inch single

- Boney M. 2000: "Hooray! Hooray! (Caribbean Night Fever)" (BMG 74321 71114 1, 1999)

"Caribbean Night Fever – Megamix" (extended version) – 5:26 / "Hooray! Hooray! It's a Holi-Holiday" (extended version) – 4:26 / "Caribbean Tropical Mix" – 6:02 / "Caribbean Carnival Mix" – 6:02

=== Chart positions ===
Chart positions (1999–2000)	Peak position
Germany (GfK)	79
New Zealand (Recorded Music NZ)	47
Spain (Promusicae)	6
Switzerland (Schweizer Hitparade)	80

== Cheeky Girls version ==
"(Hooray Hooray) It's a Cheeky Holiday"

Single by Cheeky Girls

from the album Party Time
- Released: 4 August 2003
- Length: 3:04
- Label: Multiply
- Songwriters: Frank Farian, Fred Jay, the Cheeky Boyz, Margaret Irimia-Semal
- Producer: The Cheeky Boyz

Cheeky Girls singles chronology
"Take Your Shoes Off" (2003)	"(Hooray Hooray) It's a Cheeky Holiday" (2003)	"Have a Cheeky Christmas" (2003)

Music video
- "Hooray Hooray (It's a Cheeky Holiday)" on YouTube

The Cheeky Girls released their cover of the song, retitled "(Hooray Hooray) It's a Cheeky Holiday", as a follow-up to their successful debut single, "Cheeky Song (Touch My Bum)". Their version gave them their third top-five hit in the UK, peaking at number three.

== Other versions ==
- The Spanish group Parchís covered the song on their first LP under the same title, but sung completely in Spanish by the two female vocalists in the group, Gemma and Yolanda.
- Hong Kong singer Susanna Kwan covered the song in Cantonese in 1979 as "Summer Delight" (夏日多歡享 ha yat dor foon heung) on her album Wing han dik foo pak (永恒的琥珀).
- Danish singer Birthe Kjær covered the song in Danish in 1980 as "Hurra! Hurra! Sikken dejlig dag".
- Ricky Martin covered the song in Spanish in 1993 on his album Me Amarás.

== See also ==
- List of music released by Romanian artists that has charted in major music markets
