= Cheeky Song (Touch My Bum) =

2002 single by the Cheeky Girls

Single by the Cheeky Girls

from the album Partytime
- Released: 2 December 2002
- Length: 3:21
- Label: Multiply
- Songwriters: The Cheeky Boyz; Margaret Irimia
- Producer: The Cheeky Boyz

The Cheeky Girls singles chronology
"Cheeky Song (Touch My Bum)" (2002)	"Take Your Shoes Off" (2003)

"Cheeky Song (Touch My Bum)" is a song by Popstars: The Rivals contestants the Cheeky Girls. Written by Pete Kirtley and Tim Hawes (under the name The Cheeky Boyz) and the girls' mother, Margaret Irimia, the song was released as a single on 2 December 2002, while the show was still running, and was later included on the group's debut album, PartyTime.

"Cheeky Song" spent four non-consecutive weeks at number two in the UK singles chart in December 2002 and January 2003. It was also successful in several other European countries, reaching the top 10 in the Netherlands and the Flanders region of Belgium. Despite its success, the song was voted the worst pop record of all time in a Channel 4 poll, in January 2004.

== Track listings ==
UK CD1

1. "Cheeky Song (Touch My Bum)" (radio edit) – 3:21
2. "Cheeky Song (Touch My Bum)" (Christmas mix) – 3:27
3. "Cheeky Song (Touch My Bum)" (clubstar remix) – 6:09

UK CD2

1. "Cheeky Song (Touch My Bum)" (radio edit) – 3:21
2. "Cheeky Song (Touch My Bum)" (LMC remix) – 5:18
3. "Cheeky Song (Touch My Bum)" (extended mix) – 6:05
4. "Cheeky Song (Touch My Bum)" (video)

UK 12-inch single

A1. "Cheeky Song (Touch My Bum)" (radio edit)
A2. "Cheeky Song (Touch My Bum)" (extended original mix)
B1. "Cheeky Song (Touch My Bum)" (LMC remix)
B2. "Cheeky Song (Touch My Bum)" (clubstar remix)

UK cassette single

1. "Cheeky Song (Touch My Bum)" (radio edit)
2. "Cheeky Song (Touch My Bum)" (LMC remix)

European CD single

1. "Cheeky Song (Touch My Bum)" (radio edit) – 3:21
2. "Cheeky Song (Touch My Bum)" (clubstar remix) – 6:09

Australian CD single

1. "Cheeky Song (Touch My Bum)" (radio edit) – 3:23
2. "Cheeky Song (Touch My Bum)" (Christmas mix) – 3:29
3. "Cheeky Song (Touch My Bum)" (clubstar remix) – 6:06
4. "Cheeky Song (Touch My Bum)" (LMC remix) – 5:21
5. "Cheeky Song (Touch My Bum)" (video)

== Charts ==
=== Weekly charts ===
Chart (2002–2003)	Peak position
Australia (ARIA)	59
Belgium (Ultratop 50 Flanders)	4
Belgium (Ultratip Bubbling Under Wallonia)	10
Europe (Eurochart Hot 100)	4
Finland (Suomen virallinen lista)	16
France (SNEP)	19
Germany (GfK)	52
Hungary (Single Top 40)	5
Ireland (IRMA)	12
Netherlands (Dutch Top 40)	6
Netherlands (Single Top 100)	4
Romania (Romanian Top 100)	42
Scottish Singles Sales (Official Charts)	1
Sweden (Sverigetopplistan)	28
Switzerland (Schweizer Hitparade)	73
UK Singles (Official Charts)	2

=== Year-end charts ===
Chart (2002)	Position
Ireland (IRMA)	99
UK Singles (OCC)	24

Chart (2003)	Position
Belgium (Ultratop 50 Flanders)	33
Netherlands (Dutch Top 40)	98
Netherlands (Single Top 100)	42
UK Singles (OCC)	67

== Certifications ==
Region	Certification	Certified units/sales
United Kingdom (BPI)	Gold	400,000^{‡}
^{‡} Sales+streaming figures based on certification alone.

== Release history ==
Region	Date	Format(s)	Label(s)	Ref.
United Kingdom	2 December 2002	CD	Multiply	
Australia	3 February 2003	CD	Multiply	

== See also ==
- 2002 in British music charts
- List of music considered the worst
- List of music released by Romanian artists that has charted in major music markets
