= Zion's Daughter =

Single by Boney M.

from the album Christmas Album
- Released: November 1982
- Recorded: 1981
- Genre: Pop, Disco
- Length: 3:51
- Label: Hansa (FRG)
- Songwriters: Georg Friedrich Händel; Frank Farian; Helmut Rulofs; Fred Jay
- Producer: Frank Farian

Boney M. singles chronology
"The Carnival Is Over" / "Going Back West" (1982)	"Zion's Daughter" (1982)	"Jambo - Hakuna Matata (No Problems)" (1983)

Audio video
- "Zion's Daughter" on YouTube

"Zion's Daughter" is a 1982 Christmas single by German band Boney M., the second single to be released off their Christmas Album, released in November 1981. It was a re-worked up-tempo version of See, the conqu'ring hero comes!, a chorus from Georg Friedrich Händel's 1746 oratorio Judas Maccabaeus with English lyrics by Fred Jay. The tune is also used for the German advent hymn Tochter Zion, freue dich and the English hymn Thine Be the Glory, and is well known in England as part of Henry Wood's Fantasia on British Sea Songs (1905), performed every year at the BBC's Last Night of the Proms concert.

The single featured a manipulated photo from 1978 with new male singer Reggie Tsiboe inserted in place of original member Bobby Farrell. The single peaked at 41 in the German charts. In Scandinavia, "Feliz Navidad" was chosen as the 1982 Christmas single, and in Spain, Ariola opted for "Jingle Bells".

== Release ==
- "Zion's Daughter" - 3:51 / "White Christmas" (Irving Berlin) (edit) - 3:15 (Hansa 104 874–100, Germany)
