= The 20 Greatest Christmas Songs =

Compilation album by Boney M.
- Released: November 1986
- Recorded: 1981, 1984, 1986
- Genres: R&B, Christmas, Euro disco
- Length: 56:23
- Label: Hansa Records (EU)
- Producer: Frank Farian

Boney M. chronology
The Best of 10 Years – 32 Superhits (1986)	The 20 Greatest Christmas Songs (1986)	Greatest Hits of All Times – Remix '88 (1988)

Professional ratings
Review scores
Source	Rating
Allmusic	3/5 stars

The 20 Greatest Christmas Songs is a compilation/remix album by Boney M. In 1986 producer Frank Farian took the master tapes from 1981's Christmas Album, added six recordings by Liz Mitchell, Reggie Tsiboe and two session singers from 1984, remixed them and created Die 20 schönsten Weihnachtslieder der Welt, internationally released as The 20 Greatest Christmas Songs. The 1986 version of the Boney M. Christmas album has since been re-issued as The Most Beautiful Christmas Songs of the World (1992), A Wonderful Christmas Time (1998) and Christmas Party (1998 and 2003).

== Track listing ==
Side A

1. "Christmas Medley ("Silent Night, Holy Night" / "Snow Falls Over the Ground" / "Hear Ye the Message" / "Sweet Bells") (Franz Xaver Gruber, Joseph Mohr, Farian, Jay) - 7:51
  - Full-length version including the previously unreleased "Sweet Bells". Features Amy & Elaine Goff singing the first verse of "Silent Night, Holy Night" in German - instead of Liz Mitchell singing the first verse in English.
2. "Oh Christmas Tree" ("O Tannenbaum") (Ernst Anschütz, Farian) - 2:54
3. "Hark the Herald Angels Sing" (Felix Mendelssohn, Charles Wesley, Farian) - 3:03
4. "Zion's Daughter" (George Frideric Handel, Traditional, Farian, Jay, Rulofs) - 3:50
5. "The First Noel" (Traditional) - 3:03
6. "Oh Come All Ye Faithful" (John Francis Wade, Farian) - 3:41
7. "Petit Papa Noël" (Martinet, Vincy) - 1:41
8. "Darkness Is Falling" (Jay, Rulofs) - 3:02

Side B

1. "Joy to the World" (Lowell Mason, Isaac Watts) - 2:32
2. "White Christmas" (Irving Berlin) - 3:21
  - Edited version
3. "Jingle Bells" (James Lord Pierpont, Farian) - 3:28
4. "Feliz Navidad" (José Feliciano) - 2:21
5. "When a Child Is Born" (Jay, Zacar) - 3:19
6. "Little Drummer Boy" (Katherine K. Davis, Henry Onorati, Harry Simeone) - 4:21
7. "Mary's Boy Child - Oh My Lord" (Jester Hairston, Farian) - 5:09
  - Edited version
8. "Auld Lang Syne" (Robert Burns, Traditional) - 2:34

== Personnel ==
- Liz Mitchell - lead vocals (except trk. A2, A5, A6, B1, B8), backing vocals
- Marcia Barrett - backing vocals (track B3, B4, B7)
- Frank Farian - backing vocals
- Reggie Tsiboe - lead vocals, backing vocals (tracks A2, A5, A6, B1 & B8)
- London Christmas Choir - choir (tracks A1, A5, A7, A8, B2, B5 & B6)
- Amy & Elaine Goff - lead- and backing vocals (tracks A1, A2, A3, A5, A6, B1 & B8)
- London Philharmonic Orchestra - orchestra

== Production ==
- Frank Farian - producer, remixer

== Release history ==
- Germany 1986: Die 20 Schönsten Weihnachtslieder der Welt Hansa Records 208 018-630, LP
- Germany 1986: Die 20 Schönsten Weihnachtslieder der Welt Hansa Records 258 018-225, CD
- Germany 1986: Die 20 Schönsten Weihnachtslieder der Welt Hansa Records 408 018-270, CASS
- CANADA 1986: The 20 Greatest Christmas Songs Ariola 258 018, CD
- CANADA 1995: The 20 Greatest Christmas Songs Ariola 258 018, CD, RE-Issue
- CANADA 1986: The 20 Greatest Christmas Songs Ariola 408 018, CASS
- EU 1986: The 20 Greatest Christmas Songs Hansa 208 116-320, LP
- EU 1986: The 20 Greatest Christmas Songs Hansa 258 116-200, CD
- Indonesia 1986: Die 20 Schönsten Weihnachtslieder der Welt Hansa 408 018-501, CASS
