= Eye Dance =

Studio album by Boney M.
- Released: 2 October 1985
- Recorded: 1985
- Studios: Far Studios, Munich
- Genres: Europop; Euro disco; reggae; Synthpop
- Length: 41:33
- Labels: Hansa (FRG); Atlantic (US); Carrere (UK)
- Producer: Frank Farian

Boney M. chronology
Christmas with Boney M. (1984)	Eye Dance (1985)	The Best of 10 Years – 32 Superhits (1986)

Singles from Eye Dance
- 1. "My Cherie Amour" Released: May 1985; 2. "Young, Free and Single" Released: September 1985; 3. "Bang Bang Lulu" Released: June 1986

Professional ratings
Review scores
Source	Rating
Allmusic	1.5/5 stars

Eye Dance is the eighth and final studio album by the vocal group Boney M., released in 1985. The cover artwork was symbolic of the state the group was in at that time, as neither the famous "Boney M." logo nor the group members appeared on the cover, and were replaced by an anonymous drawing.

Eye Dance was recorded with a number of session singers. Original group members Liz Mitchell and Marcia Barrett only appeared on a few of the tracks, the main focus being on Reggie Tsiboe. The singles "My Cherie Amour" and "Young Free and Single" were promoted by Boney M. as a quintet, with former group member Bobby Farrell back in the line-up; both these singles and the album were resounding failures, both critically and commercially, and in early 1986 the band and producer Frank Farian went their separate ways after a 10 Years Boney M. anniversary TV special.

== Track listing ==
1. "Young, Free and Single" (Mary Susan Applegate, Frank Farian, Robert Rayen) - 4:10
2. "Todos Buenos" (Mary Susan Applegate, Frank Farian) - 4:34
3. "Give It Up" (Bernd Dietrich, Gerd Grabowski, Engelbert Simons) - 3:58
4. "Sample City" (Rainer Maria Ehrhardt, Frank Farian) - 3:43
5. "My Cherie Amour" (Henry Cosby, Sylvia Moy, Stevie Wonder) - 4:04
6. "Eye Dance" (Mary Susan Applegate, Frank Farian, Pit Löw) - 4:04
7. "Got Cha Loco" (Mary Susan Applegate, Harald Baierl, Frank Farian, Robert Rayen) - 3:34
8. "Dreadlock Holiday" (Graham Gouldman, Eric Stewart) - 4:52
9. "Chica da Silva" (Catherine Courage, Frank Farian, Hans-Jörg Mayer "Reyam") - 5:33
10. "Bang Bang Lulu" (Traditional, Frank Farian, Peter Bischof-Fallenstein) - 3:01

== Personnel ==
- Reggie Tsiboe - lead vocals (track 1, 5, 8 & 10), backing vocals
- Liz Mitchell - lead vocals (track 2, 7 & 9), backing vocals
- Frank Farian - lead vocals (track 2, 4, 6) backing vocals
- Marcia Barrett - backing vocals
- Bobby Farrell - vocoder vocals (track 1)
- Rhonda Heath (La Mama) - vocals (track 2 & 3)
- Madeleine Davis (La Mama) - vocals (track 2 & 3)
- Patricia Shockley (La Mama) - vocals (track 2 & 3)
- Amy Goff - backing vocals (track 1, 5, 8 & 10)
- Elaine Goff - backing vocals (track 1, 5, 8 & 10)
- Harry Baierl - keyboards
- Mats Björklund - keyboards, guitar, bass
- Pit Löw - keyboards
- Curt Cress - drums

== Production ==
- Frank Farian - producer
- Harry Baierl - arranger, programmer
- Mats Björklund - arranger, programmer
- Pit Löw - arranger, programmer
- Bernd Berwanger - sound engineer
- Carmine Di - engineer
- Michael Bestmann - engineer
- Tammy Grohé - engineer
- David Simic - artwork, cover design
- Recorded and mixed at Far Studios, Rosbach and Basic Studio, Munich.

== Reissued ==
- 1994: CD, BMG 74321 21264 2
- 2007: CD, Sony BMG Music Entertainment 88697094842
- 2017: Boney M. Complete, 9 × LP box set, Sony Music 88985406971
