= 20th Century Hits =

- Cover to the standard edition of the album

Remix album by Boney M.
- Released: November 1999
- Recorded: 1976–1984, 1998, 1999
- Length: 74:44
- Label: MCI/BMG (EU)
- Producer: Frank Farian

Boney M. chronology
Ultimate (1999)	20th Century Hits (1999)	25 Jaar Na Daddy Cool (2000)

Alternative cover
- Malaysian edition

Professional ratings
Review scores
Source	Rating
AllMusic	3.5/5 stars

20th Century Hits is a remix album of recordings by Boney M. released by BMG in 1999. This remix project which was credited as 'Boney M. 2000' spun off a series of new single releases; "Ma Baker – Somebody Scream" in early 1999 and previously included on French compilation Ultimate, "Daddy Cool '99" featuring Mobi T., "Caribbean Night Fever / Hooray! Hooray! It's A Holi-Holiday" and "Sunny".

== Track listing ==
No.	Title	Writer(s)	Length
1.	"Sunny" (1999 Remix)	Hebb	3:38
2.	"Daddy Cool" (1999 Remix)	Farian, Reyam	3:52
3.	"Ma Baker" (1999 Remix)	Farian, Jay, Reyam	3:51
4.	"Rivers of Babylon" (1999 Remix)	Farian, Reyam	3:19
5.	"Gotta Go Home" (1999 Remix)	Farian, Jay, Klinkhammer	3:20
6.	"Rasputin" (1999 Remix)	Farian, Jay, Reyam	3:28
7.	"Painter Man" (1999 Remix)	Phillips, Pickett	3:00
8.	"No Woman, No Cry" (1999 Remix)	Ford, Marley	3:21
9.	"Brown Girl in the Ring" (1999 Remix)	Farian	3:34
10.	"Hooray! Hooray! It's a Holi-Holiday" (1999 Remix)	Farian, Jay	3:23
11.	"Kalimba de Luna" (1999 Remix)	Amoruso, DiFranco, Esposito, Licastro, Malavas	3:42
12.	"Felicidad" (Miami Ocean Drive Mix)	Conz, Massara	3:46
13.	"Mary's Boy Child/Oh My Lord" (1992 Radio Version Edit)	Farian, Hairston	3:43
14.	"Caribbean Nightfever" (Medley)	Traditional	4:35
15.	"Disco Megamix"	Frank Farian/ George Reyam (Hans-Jörg Mayer)/ Fred Jay/ Robert "Bobby" Von Hebb/ Kenny Pickett/ Eddie Phillips/ Brent Dowe/ Trevor McNaughton/ James Robert Bilsbury/ Drafi Richard Franz Deutscher/ Joe Menke/ Heinz Huth/ Jürgen Hut	6:26
16.	"Sunny" (1999 Club Mix)	Hebb	4:10
17.	"Ma Baker" (1999 Club Mix)	Farian, Jay, Reyam	4:31
18.	"Daddy Cool" (1999 Club Mix)	Farian, Reyam	4:09
19.	"Rivers of Babylon" (1999 Club Mix)	Farian, Reyam	3:59
20.	"Gotta Go Home" (1999 Club Mix)	Farian, Jay, Klinkhammer	4:18

== Personnel ==
- Liz Mitchell – lead vocals, backing vocals
- Marcia Barrett – lead vocals, backing vocals
- Frank Farian – lead vocals, backing vocals
- Reggie Tsiboe – lead vocals, backing vocals (track 11)
- Keith Forsey – drums
- Curt Cress – drums
- Todd Canedy – drums
- Gary Unwinn – bass guitar
- Dave King – bass
- Dieter Petereit – bass
- Nick Woodland – guitars
- Mats Björklund – guitars
- Johan Daansen – guitars
- Michael Cretu – keyboards
- Kristian Schultze – keyboards
- Harry Baierl – keyboards
- Sylvester Levay – keyboards
- Thor Baldursson – keyboards
- Christoph Seipel – keyboards
- Domenico Livrano – keyboards
- Dino Solera – saxophone
- Benny Gebauer – sax
- Felice Civitareale – trumpet

== Production ==
- Frank Farian – producer, remixer
- Tokapi – producer
- Sash! – remixers
- Doug Laurent – remixer
- Nouri – remixer
- Marek – remixer
- Zeke Lund – sound engineer
- Hartmut Pfannmüller – engineer
- Tammy Grohé – engineer
- Rainer M. Ehrnhardt – engineer
- Michael Bestmann – engineer
- Bernd Berwanger – engineer
- Tobias Freud – engineer
- Helmut Rulofs – engineer
- Michael Cretu – arranger
- Stefan Klinkhammer – arranger
- Harry Baierl – arranger

== Single releases ==
UK

12"

- Boney M. vs. Horny United "Ma Baker/Somebody Scream" (Logic Records 74321 65387 1, 1999)

Side A

1. "Ma Baker (Club Mix by Horny United)

Side B

1. "Somebody Scream" (Beatroute Star Bar Mix by DJ Slammer & Mark Bambach)
2. "Somebody Scream" (Cosmic People Mix)

CD

- Boney M. vs. Horny United "Ma Baker/Somebody Scream" (Logic Records 74321 65387 2, 1999)
1. "Somebody Scream" (Radio Edit) – 3:06
2. "Ma Baker" (Sash! Radio Edit) – 3:27
3. "Somebody Scream" (Massive Club mix) – 7:31
4. "Ma Baker" (Sash! 12" Mix) – 4:55

EU

12"

- Boney M. / Horny United Feat. Boney M. – "Ma Baker" / "Somebody Scream – Ma Baker" (2 x 12", Logic Records/Lautstark/BMG 74321 64561 1, 1999)

Side A

1. Boney M. "Ma Baker" (Extended Vocal Edit) – 5:26

Side B

1. Boney M. "Ma Baker" (Disco Dub Edit) – 5:35

Side C

1. Horny United "Somebody Scream – Ma Baker" (Massive Mix) – 7:30
2. Horny United "Somebody Scream – Ma Baker" (Screamless Mix) – 6:16

Side D

1. Horny United "Somebody Scream – Ma Baker" (Full Vocal Mix)
2. Horny United "Somebody Scream – Ma Baker" (Ma Baker House Mix)

CD

- Boney M vs. Sash!: "Ma Baker" (BMG 74321 63942 2, 1998)
1. "Ma Baker (Tokapi Radio Edit) – 3:24
2. "Ma Baker" (Original Edit) – 3:35
3. "Ma Baker" (Extended Vocal Edit) – 5:26
4. "Ma Baker" (Disco Dub Edit) – 5:35
- Boney M. vs. Sash!/Horny United Featuring Boney M.: "Ma Baker"/"Somebody Scream" (BMG 74321 64561 2, 1999)
1. Boney M. vs. Sash! "Ma Baker" (Extended Radio Edit) – 4:54
2. Boney M. vs. Sash! "Ma Baker" (Disco Dub Edit) (5:32)
3. Horny United Featuring Boney M. "Somebody Scream (Ma Baker)" (Radio Edit) (Oliver Wallner, Re-Run) – 4:17
4. Horny United Featuring Boney M. "Somebody Scream (Ma Baker)" (Massive Mix) (Oliver Wallner, Re-Run) – 6:59
- Boney M. 2000 Featuring Mobi T.: "Daddy Cool '99" (BMG 74321 69177 2, 1999)
1. "Daddy Cool '99" (Radio Edit) – 3:51
2. "Daddy Cool '99" (Extended Vocal Club Mix) – 5:06
3. "Daddy Cool '99" (Latino Club Mix) – 3:33
4. "Daddy Cool '99" (Solid Disco Edit) – 3:45
5. "Daddy Cool" (Original Mix 1976) – 3:26
- Boney M. 2000: "Hooray! Hooray! (Caribbean Night Fever)" (BMG 74321 71064 2, 1999)
1. "Caribbean Night Fever – Megamix" (Radio Edit) – 3:55
2. "Hooray! Hooray! It's a Holi-Holiday" (Radio Edit) – 3:30
3. "Caribbean Night Fever" (Extended Version) – 5:28
4. "Hooray! Hooray! It's a Holi-Holiday" (Extended Version) – 4:26
5. "Brown Girl in the Ring" (Remix) – 4:01
- Boney M. 2000: "Sunny (Remixes)" (BMG 74321 73824 2, 2000)
1. "Sunny" (Radio Edit) – 3:31
2. "Sunny" (Radio Remix – Disco Club) – 3:35
3. "Sunny" (Extended Version) – 4:47
4. "Sunny" (Disco Club Mix) – 5:46
5. "Sunny" (Club Mix) – 4:45
6. "Sunny" (House Mix) – 4:55
7. "Sunny" (London Vocal Mix) – 3:34
8. "Sunny" (Space Mix) – 4:51

== Certifications ==
Region	Certification	Certified units/sales
Spain (PROMUSICAE)	Platinum	100,000^{^}
^{^} Shipments figures based on certification alone.

== Sources and external links ==
- Rate Your Music, detailed discography
- Discogs.com, detailed discography
- Allmusic, biography, discography etc.
