= Melo-M =

Latvian musical group

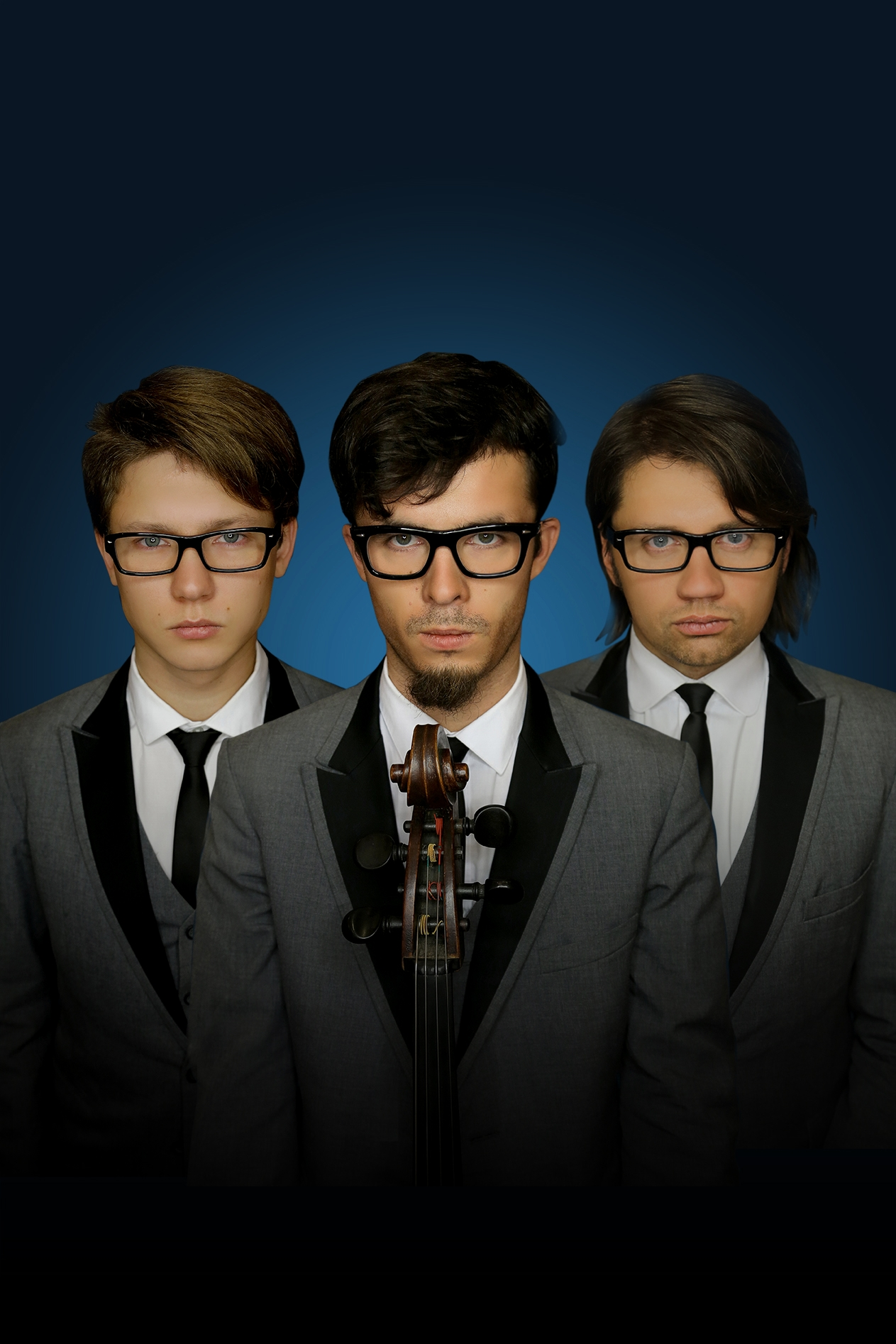
Melo-M in 2013

Melo-M is a Latvian instrumental cello rock trio consisting of three classically trained cellists: Kārlis Auzāns, Miķelis Dobičins and Jānis Pauls. The name is derived from the word melomania.

They are known for their instrumental cover versions of various English language songs, most notably "The Final Countdown", the theme from "Mission Impossible" and the theme from Ghostbusters. Cello trio Melo-M emerged in 2005 when academically trained musicians Karlis Auzans, Miķelis Dobičins and Janis Pauls decided to unite their musical talents and create a band.

Melo-M play cello versions of variety of well-known music: from classical to ethno, pop and rock.

The trio released four LPs so far: self-entitled Melo-M album (2005) consisting of cello covers of popular Latvian songs, Singalongs (2007) with their interpretations of world’s modern classics, Around The World (2009) – an album of ethno and world music melodies covered by the band and Phantasy Of The Opera (2010). All four albums were entirely produced by founder of Melo-M Karlis Auzans.

Melo-M are also well known outside Latvia. Throughout eight years of their musical career the band toured in USA twice, played a variety of concerts in Russia, France, Great Britain, Sweden, Norway, Germany, Ukraine, Estonia, Lithuania, Turkey and elsewhere.

Melo-M shared the stage with such artists as vocalist of Boney M Maizie Williams, Swedish multi-instrumentalist Robert Wells, Finnish metal band Apocalyptica, popular Latvia-born singer Laima Vaikule, legendary composer Raimonds Pauls and many more.

The band has a rich experience in classical music: they played a number of concerts with symphonic orchestras and collaborated with famous Latvian dance ensemble Dzirnas while working on modern theatre play called Apstājies! Classical concerts of Melo-M often include soprano singer Sonora Vaici.

In 2009, Canadian skater Jeremy Ten included Melo-M cover of The Beatles song Come Together in his skating program.

Melo - M are laureates of first Terem Crossover Competition (bronze medal) in 2010 Saint Petersburg, Russia.

Every band member has a significant academic music background. Each of the three played at international contests and performed with orchestras at notable symphonic music concerts. Melo-M members have strengthened their academic education by learning from such world-class cello players as: Mstislav Rostropovich, Klauss Kangiser, Misha Maiski, Frans Helmerson, Maksim Utkin and Natalia Shovskaya.

Uniqueness of Melo-M performances lies in their ability to combine foundations of the classical music with energy and drive of pop and rock shows.

== Discography ==
- Melo-M (2005)
- Singalongs (2007)
- Around the World (2009)
- Phantasy of the Opera (2010)
- From the forest we come (2016)
