= Christmas Album (Boney M. album) =

Studio album by Boney M.
- Released: 23 November 1981
- Recorded: 1978, 1981
- Length: 44:11
- Labels: Hansa (FRG); Atlantic (UK)
- Producer: Frank Farian

Boney M. chronology
Boonoonoonoos (1981)	Christmas Album (1981)	Ten Thousand Lightyears (1984)

Singles from Christmas Album
- 1. "Little Drummer Boy" Released: 1981; 2. "Zion's Daughter" Released: November 1982

Professional ratings
Review scores
Source	Rating
AllMusic	3/5 stars

Christmas Album is the sixth studio album by Boney M. It was recorded in the summer of 1981 and released on 23 November 1981. In certain territories the album was given the alternate title Christmas with Boney M.

The album includes the million-selling 1978 Christmas number one "Mary's Boy Child/Oh My Lord" and it yielded two further single releases, "Little Drummer Boy" in 1981, which became a Top 20 hit in Germany. A second single released for Christmas 1982, "Zion's Daughter" (with new member Reggie Tsiboe pictured on the cover), peaked at 41 in the German charts.

== Track listing ==
Side A
No.	Title	Writer(s)	Notes	Length
1.	"Little Drummer Boy"	Katherine K. Davis, Henry Onorati, Harry Simeone		4:21
2.	"White Christmas"	Irving Berlin		4:19
3.	"Feliz Navidad"	José Feliciano		3:07
4.	"Jingle Bells"	James Lord Pierpont, Frank Farian		2:53
5.	"Winter Fairy-Tale" (Instrumental)	Harald Baierl		2:58
6.	"Mary's Boy Child / Oh My Lord"	Jester Hairston, Hela Lorin, Frank Farian, Fred Jay	Edited version	5:10
Total length:				22:48

Side B
No.	Title	Writer(s)	Notes	Length
1.	"Christmas Medley" • "Silent Night, Holy Night (Stille Nacht, Heilige Nacht)" • "Snow Falls Over the Ground (Leise Rieselt Der Schnee)" • "Hear Ye the Message"	Franz Xaver Gruber, Joseph Mohr, Eduard Ebel, Frank Farian, Fred Jay	The 2nd verse of "Silent Night" is sung in German on the German LP release but in English on the UK release. The full-length medley contained "Sweet Bells ("Süßer die Glocken nie klingen")" which wasn't released until 1986 when the medley was remixed and overdubbed with the first two verses of "Silent Night" sung in German while the third verse was sung in English.	6:20
2.	"Petit Papa Noël"	Martinet, Vincy		1:41
3.	"Zion's Daughter (Tochter Zion)"	Traditional, George Frideric Handel, Frank Farian, Fred Jay, Helmut Rulofs		3:51
4.	"When a Child Is Born"	Fred Jay, Zacar		3:20
5.	"Darkness Is Falling"	Fred Jay, Helmut Rulofs		3:02
6.	"I'll Be Home for Christmas"	Catherine Courage, Frank Farian, Helmut Rulofs		3:44
Total length:				21:58

== Personnel ==
=== Musicians ===
- Michael Drexler – lead vocals (track A1)
- Liz Mitchell – lead vocals (tracks A1–A4, A6, B1–B5)
- Marcia Barrett – backing vocals (tracks A3, A4 & A6)
- Frank Farian – lead vocals (track B6), backing vocals
- London Christmas Choir – choir
- Katie Kissoon – vocals, soprano
- Joy Yates – vocals, alto
- Helen Shappelle – vocals, soprano
- Simon Bell – vocals, tenor
- Nick Curtis – vocals, tenor
- George Chandler – vocals, baritone
- Russell Stone – vocals, bass
- Jerry Rix – additional vocals on track A1, bass
- Curt Cress – drums
- Dave King – bass guitar
- Günther Gebauer – bass guitar
- Mats Björklund – guitar
- Johan Daansen – guitar
- Harry Baierl – keyboards
- Kristian Schultze – keyboards
- London Philharmonic Orchestra – orchestra

=== Production ===
- Kurt Rieth – choir director
- Frank Farian – producer
- Helmut Rulofs – assistant producer
- Harry Baierl – musical arranger
- Stefan Klinkhammer – musical arranger
- Recorded at Abbey Road Studios and AIR Studios, London
- Steve Nye – sound engineer
- Recorded at Vigilant Studio, Nice
- Didier Utard – engineer
- Recorded at Union Studio, Munich
- Jochen Scheffer – engineer
- Recorded at Rainbow studio, Munich
- Volker Armand – engineer
- Mixed at Farian Studio
- Ariola-Eurodisc Studios – design
- Claus Lange – photography

== Charts ==
Chart performance for Christmas Album
Chart (1981–1982)	Peak position
Dutch Albums (Album Top 100)	10
German Albums (Offizielle Top 100)	14
New Zealand Albums (RMNZ)	42

Chart (2024–2025)	Peak position
Greek Albums (IFPI)	77
Nigerian Albums (TurnTable)	52

== Certifications and sales ==
Certifications and sales for Christmas Album
Region	Certification	Certified units/sales
Australia (ARIA)	Gold	35,000^{^}
Canada (Music Canada)	2× Platinum	200,000^{^}
Germany	—	~200,000
^{^} Shipments figures based on certification alone.

== Reissued ==
- 1991: CD, Hansa 786723
- 2007: Christmas With Boney M., CD, Sony BMG Music Entertainment 88697 14032 2
- 2017: Boney M. Complete, 9 × LP box set, Sony Music 88985406971
