= Multiply Records =

UK record label 1993–2004

Multiply Records was a subsidiary of British label Telstar Records, that launched in 1993 and went into liquidation in 2004. Its major signings included Sash!, Phats & Small and the Cheeky Girls.

It was the brainchild of Mike Hall, who already worked for the parent company Telstar. Early successes included signing Bassment Jaxx's "Flylife", TJR feat Xavier's "Just Gets Better", one of the garage scene's foremost hits, as well as Lil Mo Yin Yang's "Reach", and Junior Vasquez's "If Madonna Calls". As a label, they balanced credible releases with commercial hits, and enjoyed considerable success, as well as providing content for Telstar's huge compilation business.

The label had three sub labels – Multiply White (active 1995–1996), Sum Records (active 1996–1998) and MP2 (active in 2001).

In 2014, a number of Multiply releases were released to iTunes and Spotify by Phoenix Music International. Additionally, some releases by other Telstar dance subsidiaries such as Decode and Pukka were digitally released under the Multiply brand.

== Releases ==
=== Singles ===
Cat #	Artist	Title	Year	UK singles chart
MULTY1	4th Measure Men	4 You	1994	81
MULTY2	20 Fingers featuring Gillette	Short Dick Man	1994	21
MULTY3	Carol Bailey	Feel It	1995	41
MULTY4	Rhythm Factor	You Bring Me Joy	1995	53
MULTY5	Jinny	Keep Warm	1995	11
MULTY6	Nuff Sisters	Serious Situation	1995	92
MULTY7	20 Fingers featuring Gillette	Short Dick Man (re-issue)	1995	11
MULTY8	Jinny	Wanna Be With You	1995	30
MULTY9	Lil Mo' Yin Yang	Reach	1996	28
MULTY10	Frank 'O Moiraghi feat Amnesia	Feel My Body	1996	39
MULTY11	Staccato	I Wanna Know	1996	65
MULTY12	Sartorello	Move Baby Move	1996	56
MULTY13	Junior Vasquez	If Madonna Calls	1996	24
MULTY14	The Rise	Love Is Gonna Be There	1996	Promo Only
MULTY15	Frank 'O Moiraghi	Feel My Body (re-issue)	1996	40
MULTY16	Tanya Louise	Deep in You	1996	Did Not Chart
MULTY17	Partizan	Drive Me Crazy	1997	36
MULTY18	Sash!	Encore Une Fois	1997	2
MULTY19	Team Deep	Morning Light	1997	42
MULTY20	Red 5	I Love You... Stop!	1997	11
MULTY21	Basement Jaxx	Fly Life	1997	19
MULTY22	Snakebite	The Bit Goes On	1997	25
MULTY23	Sash! feat Rodriguez	Ecuador	1997	2
MULTY24	Mama Mystique	Tremendous	1997	154
MULTY25	TJR	Just Gets Better	1997	28
MULTY26	Sash! feat La Trec	Stay	1997	2
MULTY27	Marco Polo Cecere feat Chris	I Feel You	1997	Promo Only
MULTY28	Fabulous Baker Boys	Oh Boy	1997	34
MULTY29	Partizan feat Natalie Robb	Keep Your Love	1997	53
MULTY30	Red 5	Lift Me Up	1997	26
MULTY31	Jez & Choopie – Yim	Yim	1998	36
MULTY32	Sash! – La Primavera	La Primavera	1998	3
MULTY33	Lambda feat Martha Wash – Hold on Tight	Hold on Tight	1998	Promo Only
MULTY34	O.R.G.A.N. – To The World	To The World	1998	33
MULTY35	Studio 2 – Travelling Man	Travelling Man	1998	40
MULTY36				
MULTY37	Rachel McFarlane – Lover	Lover	1998	38
MULTY38	Truman & Wolff feat Steel Horses – Come Again	Come Again	1998	57
MULTY39	Double Six – Real Good	Real Good	1998	66
MULTY40	Sash! feat Tina Cousins – Mysterious Times	Mysterious Times	1998	2
MULTY41				
MULTY42	Afrika Bambaataa Vs Carpe Diem	Got To Get Up	1998	22
MULTY43	Absolom	Secret	1998	Promo Only
MULTY44	Mike Koglin	The Silence	1998	20
MULTY45	Sash! feat Shannon	Move Mania	1998	8
MULTY46	Mirrorball	Given Up	1999	12
MULTY47	Blackout	Gotta Have Hope	1999	46
MULTY48	Sash!	Colour The World	1999	15
MULTY49	Phats & Small	Turn Around	1999	2
MULTY50	Double Six	Breakdown	1999	59
MULTY51	Mike Koglin	On My Way	1999	28
MULTY52	Heliotropic	Alive	1999	33
MULTY53	The 3 Jays	Feeling It Too	1999	17
MULTY54	Phats & Small	Feel Good	1999	7
MULTY55	Brainchild	Symmetry C	1999	31
MULTY56	Mirrorball	Burnin'	2000	47
MULTY57	Phats & Small	Tonite	1999	11
MULTY58	Hurley & Todd	Sunstorm	1999	38
MULTY59	Antoine Clamaran	We Come To Party	2000	Did Not Chart
MULTY60	Sash!	Adelante	2000	2
MULTY61	Rachel McFarlane	Lover (reissue)	2000	Promo Only
MULTY62	Sash! feat Tina Cousins	Just Around The Hill	2000	8
MULTY63	Love Connection	The Bomb	2000	53
MULTY64	Robbie Rivera pres Rhythm Bangers	Bang	2000	13
MULTY65	TJR	Just Gets Better (reissue)	2000	Promo Only
MULTY66				
MULTY67	Sash!	With My Own Eyes	2000	10
MULTY68	Sister Bliss feat John Martyn	Sister Sister	2000	34
MULTY69	The 3 Jays	Love Crazy	2000	Promo Only
MULTY70	Fiorello	Azzuro	2000	Promo Only
MULTY71	X-Ite	Let Me Luv U	2001	88
MULTY72	Sister Bliss feat John Martyn	Deliver Me	2000	31
MULTY73				
MULTY74	Java & Jan	You Drive Me Crazy	2001	Promo Only
MULTY75	Phats & Small	This Time Around	2001	15
MULTY76	Transfer	Possession	2001	54
MULTY77				
MULTY78	Weekend Players	21st Century	2001	22
MULTY79				
MULTY80	Phats & Small	Change	2001	45
MULTY81	Mojolators feat Camilla	Drifting	2001	52
MULTY82	Plank 15	Strings of Life	2002	60
MULTY83				
MULTY84	Weekend Players	Into The Sun	2002	42
MULTY85	Weekend Players	I'll Be There	2002	Promo Only
MULTY86	Flesh & Bones	I Love You	2002	70
MULTY87	Milky	Just The Way You Are	2002	8
MULTY88	Thick D	Insatiable	2002	35
MULTY89	Nova	All This Love	2003	Did Not Chart
MULTY90	MaLù	No Space	2002	Promo Only
MULTY91	Phats & Small	Turn Around 2002	2002	Promo Only
MULTY92	Milky	In My Mind	2002	48
MULTY93				
MULTY94				
MULTY95	Glider	Riding High	2003	149
MULTY96	CK & Supreme Dream Team	Dreamer	2003	Did Not Chart
MULTY97	The Cheeky Girls	Cheeky Song (Touch My Bum)	2002	2
MULTY98	Cloak & Dagger	The Boat	2003	Promo Only
MULTY99	Revelation	Just Be Dub To Me	2003	36
MULTY100				
MULTY101	The Cheeky Girls	Take Your Shoes Off	2003	3
MULTY102				
MULTY103	Aurora feat Naimee Coleman	Sleeping Satellite	2003	Did Not Chart
MULTY104	Lara Zola	This Is What I Like	2003	Promo Only
MULTY105				
MULTY106	The Cheeky Girls	Hooray Hooray (It's A Cheeky Holiday)	2003	3
MULTY107				
MULTY108				
MULTY109	Studio B feat Romeo and Harry Brooks	I See Girls (Crazy)	2003	52
MULTY110	The Cheeky Girls	Have A Cheeky Christmas	2003	10

=== Multiply White singles ===
Cat #	Artist	Title	Year	UK Chart Position
WHITE1	4th Measure Men	The Need/ The Keep	1995	Did Not Chart
WHITE2	Kimball & Dekkard	Hardlife	1996	Did Not Chart
WHITE3	Kimball & Dekkard	Starlife	1996	187
WHITE4	The Modifiers	Take Me Higher	1996	Did Not Chart

=== Sum Records singles ===
Cat #	Artist	Title	Year	UK Chart Position
SUM1	Belvedere Kane	Never Felt As Good	1996	127
SUM2	Encore!	Le Disc Jockey	1998	12
SUM3	Datura	Voo-Doo Believe?	1998	Promo Only
SUM4	Whirlpool Productions	From Disco to Disco	1998	84
SUM5	Goon	Panic	1998	178
SUM6	Happy Nation	Girls Just Wanna Have Fun	1998	77

=== MP2 Records ===
Cat #	Artist	Title	Year	UK Chart Position
MP1				
MP2	Vernon's Wonderland	Vernon's Wonderland	2001	138
MP3	Groove Juice feat Yamil Thian	Back To Africa	2001	Did Not Chat
MP4	Rithma	Water	2001	Did Not Chat
MP5	Raoul Express	High	2001	Did Not Chat

=== Albums ===
Cat #	Artist	Title	Year	UK Chart Position
MULTY1	Sash!	It's My Life	1997	6
MULTY2	Sash!	Life Goes On	1998	5
MULTY3				
MULTY4	Double Six	Beyond Sci-Fi	1999	Did Not Chart
MULTY5				
MULTY6	Phats & Small	Now Phats What I Small Music	1999	102
MULTY7	Sash!	Trilenium	2000	13
MULTY8	Phats & Small	This Time Around	2001	Did Not Chart
MULTY9				
MULTY10	Sash!	Encore Une Fois – The Greatest Hits	2000	33
MULTY11	Weekend Players	In Pursuit of Happiness	2002	155
MULTY12	Milky	Star	2002	Did Not Chart
MULTY13	The Cheeky Girls	Party Time	2003	14

== See also ==
- Lists of record labels
