= Mary's Boy Child – Oh My Lord =

1978 single by Boney M.

"Mary's Boy Child / Oh My Lord"

Single by Boney M.
- B-side: "Dancing in the Streets"
- Released: 24 November 1978
- Recorded: October 1978
- Genre: Christmas; eurodisco
- Length: 5:43 (7" version); 5:40 (French 7" version); 5:22 (Spanish 7" version); 6:18 (12" version)
- Label: Hansa (FRG); Sire (US/CAN); Atlantic (AUS/UK)
- Songwriters: Jester Hairston; Frank Farian; Fred Jay; Hela Lorin
- Producer: Frank Farian

Boney M. singles chronology
"Rasputin" (1978)	"Mary's Boy Child / Oh My Lord" (1978)	"Painter Man" (1979)

Music video
- "Boney M. - Mary's Boy Child (Officical Video)" on YouTube

"Mary's Boy Child / Oh My Lord" (Note: The two-part title separated by an oblique denotes the song on one side of the single, not (as it is often used) to indicate a double A-side.) is a 1978 Christmas single by Boney M., a cover of Harry Belafonte's 1956 hit "Mary's Boy Child", put in a medley with the new song "Oh My Lord".

The single had its premiere on 2 November 1978 on the German TV-show Starparade (Episode 44) which aired on ZDF. It topped the UK Singles Chart for four weeks and became Christmas number one in the UK, spending eight weeks in the charts. It has sold 1.89 million units as of November 2015. It was the second single for the group in the UK's all-time best selling singles list. The song was later included as a 5:10 edit leaving out the third verse and with a shortened "Oh My Lord" in the group's Christmas Album, issued in 1981.

In the United States, the track reached number 85 on the Billboard Hot 100, Boney M's last of four singles to chart there. In 2017, it experienced a resurgence and peaked at number 89 on the Holiday 100. In certain areas of the U.S., the medley can sometimes be heard during the Thanksgiving/Christmas holiday season on radio stations which change to temporary all-Christmas music formats.

== Single ==
A promotional gatefold single (Hansa, 15 816 AT, Germany) backed with "Never Change Lovers in the Middle of the Night" (from Nightflight to Venus) was released shortly before the commercial single which had a new track on the B-side "Dancing in the Streets". Different edits were issued in various countries. In Spain and France, the third verse (Now Joseph and his wife Mary came to Bethlehem that night ...) was excised, while the French mix of "Oh My Lord" was a different mix. The full-length 6:18 mix appeared as the B-side of the 12" single "Dancing in the Streets".

== Music video ==
Two music videos were produced to promote the single. One featured the band in a white room wearing white furry coats, while the second, made to promote the 1988 remix featured the band once again dressed in white with a nativity scene.

== "Dancing in the Streets" ==
After Christmas, Hansa Records flipped the single and released it with "Dancing in the Streets" on the A-side. The non-album track was sung solely by the group's producer Frank Farian, singing the chorus in multi-dubbed falsetto vocals and singing the verse in his deep voice. The mix that came out on the B-side of "Mary's Boy Child" in the UK and US was an early version with shriller falsetto vocals and no answer-back chorus vocals in the verses. Despite the lack of success, the track was chosen as the one to launch Boney M. in the USA which remained the only territory the group had yet to conquer. The group did a promotional tour in April 1979 and also lip-synced the track at important TV shows such as Soul Train but the single stalled at number 105 on the Pop chart and fared only slightly better on the R&B chart (number 75).

== Releases ==
7" singles

- "Mary's Boy Child / Oh My Lord" – 5:43 / "Dancing in the Streets" (Farian) – 3:57 (Hansa Int. 100 075–100, Germany)
- "Mary's Boy Child / Oh My Lord" – 5:43 / "Dancing in the Streets" – 3:43 (Atlantic K 11221, UK) (Sire 1036, USA)
- "Dancing in the Streets" – 3:57 / "Mary's Boy Child / Oh My Lord" – 5:43 (Hansa Int. 100 075–100, Germany)
- "Dancing in the Streets" – 3:57 / "Motherless Child" (Farian / Mitchell) – 4:33 (Durium DE 3047, Italy)
- "Dancing in the Streets" – 3:55 / "Never Change Lovers in the Middle of the Night" – 5:01 (Sire 1038, USA)

12" single

- "Dancing in the Streets" – 6:18 / "Mary's Boy Child / Oh My Lord" – 6:18 (Hansa Int. 600 009–212, Germany)
- "Dancing in the Streets" – 6:18 / "Never Change Lovers in the Middle of the Night" – 5:01 (Sire SRD 1040, USA)

== Charts ==
Chart (1978–1979)	Peak position
Austria (Ö3 Austria Top 40)	3
Belgium (Ultratop 50 Flanders)	4
Finland (Suomen Virallinen)	5
Germany (Official German Charts)	1
Ireland (Irish Singles Chart)	1
Netherlands (Single Top 100)	2
New Zealand (Recorded Music NZ)	8
Norway (VG-lista)	2
Sweden (Sverigetopplistan)	1
Switzerland (Schweizer Hitparade)	1
UK Singles (Official Charts Company)	1
US Billboard Hot 100	85
Chart (2015)	Peak position
Ireland (IRMA)	47
Chart (2016)	Peak position
Denmark (Tracklisten)	16
Chart (2017)	Peak position
US Holiday 100 (Billboard)	89
Chart (2018)	Peak position
Hungary (Single Top 40)	28
UK Singles (Official Charts Company)	26
Chart (2019)	Peak position
Australia (ARIA)	56
UK Singles (Official Charts Company)	47
Chart (2020)	Peak position
UK Singles (Official Charts Company)	80
Chart (2021)	Peak position
South Africa (RISA)	73
UK Singles (Official Charts Company)	60
Chart (2022)	Peak position
UK Singles (Official Charts Company)	52
Chart (2024)	Peak position
UK Singles (Official Charts Company)	51
Estonia Airplay (TopHit)	77
Chart (2025–2026)	Peak position
Global 200 (Billboard)	170
UK Singles (Official Charts Company)	51
Germany (Official German Charts)	45

== Certifications ==
Region	Certification	Certified units/sales
Australia (ARIA)	Gold	35,000^{‡}
Denmark (IFPI Danmark)	2× Platinum	180,000^{‡}
France	—	100,000
Germany (BVMI)	Gold	1,000,000
Netherlands (NVPI)	Gold	100,000^{^}
New Zealand (RMNZ)	Platinum	30,000^{‡}
United Kingdom (BPI)	Platinum	1,885,274
Summaries
Benelux	—	200,000
^{^} Shipments figures based on certification alone.^{‡} Sales+streaming figures based on certification alone.

== 1988 remix ==
"Rivers of Babylon (Remix)"/"Mary's Boy Child / Oh My Lord (Remix)"

Single by Boney M.

from the album Greatest Hits of All Times – Remix '88
- A-side: "Rivers of Babylon (Remix)"; "Mary's Boy Child / Oh My Lord (Remix)"
- Released: October 1988
- Genre: R&B, disco
- Label: Hansa (FRG)
- Producer: Frank Farian

Boney M. singles chronology
"Bang Bang Lulu" (1986)	"Rivers of Babylon (Remix)" / "Mary's Boy Child / Oh My Lord (Remix)" (1988)	"Megamix" (1988)

"Rivers of Babylon/"Mary's Boy Child / Oh My Lord" is a 1988 remix single by German band Boney M., issued to launch the group's reunion, having been split since their 10th anniversary, 1986. The double A-side single contained new mixes of the band's two very most successful single releases ever. Although their remix album sold well, the single failed to chart.

== "Christmas Mega Mix" ==
"Christmas Mega Mix"

Single by Boney M.

from the album The Most Beautiful Christmas Songs of the World
- Released: November 1992
- Genre: R&B, disco
- Label: Hansa (FRG)
- Producer: Frank Farian

Boney M. singles chronology
"Stories" (1990)	"Christmas Mega Mix" (1992)	"Mega Mix" (1992)

"Christmas Mega Mix" is a 1992 remix single by German band Boney M., issued to launch a new edition of their Christmas album, The Most Beautiful Christmas Songs of the World. The Christmas Mega Mix was in fact just another name for a new remix of "Mary's Boy Child - Oh My Lord". In the UK, the new mix was put on the B-side of their "Mega Mix" single.

=== Releases ===
7" single

- "Mary's Boy Child/Oh My Lord" (radio version) – 3:58 / "Zion's Daughter" – 3:50 (Hansa 74321 11933 7–100, Germany)

CD

- 1. "Mary's Boy Child/Oh My Lord" (radio version) – 3:58 / 2. "Zion's Daughter" – 3:50 / 3. "When a Child Is Born" – 3:19 / 4. "Mary's Boy Child/Oh My Lord" (long version) – 5:09

(Hansa 74321 11933 2–211, Germany)

=== Charts ===
Chart (1988)	Peak position
UK Singles (Official Charts)	52

== Covers ==
The song has been covered by the Australian pop band The Eclectics featuring Jared Lerner; Johnny Mathis in 1982; Anne Murray in 1988; Jose Mari Chan on his Christmas Album Christmas in Our Hearts in 1990; ABS-CBN Family of Stars (including APO Hiking Society and Sharon Cuneta) on The 1996 ABS-CBN All-Star Christmas Celebration; and on Glee in the episode "Previously Unaired Christmas" from the fifth season.
