= Action Painting (album) =

Compilation album by the Creation
- Released: March 17, 2017
- Length: 139:38
- Label: The Numero Group

The Creation chronology
The Singles Collection (2007)	Action Painting (2017)	Making Time – The Best of the Creation (2022)

Action Painting is a 2017 compilation album by the British band the Creation. The compilation was the first time the complete studio recordings of the band were released. They were remastered from the original tapes by the group's original producer Shel Talmy as well as being given stereo mixes where previously unavailable.

== Release ==
Action Painting was released on March 17, 2017 by The Numero Group.

== Reception ==
Professional ratings
Review scores
Source	Rating
AllMusic	4.5/5 stars
Pitchfork Media	(8.7/10)

Peter Margasak of The Chicago Reader commented that the compilation showcased "convincing evidence that the band possessed at least minor genius". Stephen Thomas Erlewine gave the album a Best New Reissue statement in Pitchfork Media, comparing the band to other contemporaries of the era, summarizing that the "compilation overwhelmingly proves, they were as self-aware as the Move, as vicious as The Who, and as clever as The Kinks." AllMusic declared the reissue "the best-looking and best-sounding set yet" for the band and declared the group's music as living "on as some of the most exciting, most impressive sounds of the '60s."

== Track listing ==
Disc 1

No.	Title	Length
1.	"Making Time"
2.	"Try and Stop Me"
3.	"Painter Man"
4.	"Biff, Bang, Pow"
5.	"Sylvette (edit)"
6.	"If I Stay Too Long"
7.	"Nightmares"
8.	"Life is Just Beginning"
9.	"Through My Eyes"
10.	"How Does It Feel To Feel"
11.	"Tom Tom"
12.	"Can I Join Your Band"
13.	"Midway Down"
14.	"The Girls are Naked"
15.	"Bonie Maronie"
16.	"Mercy Mercy Mercy"
17.	"For All That I Am"
18.	"Uncle Bert"
19.	"Cool Jerk"
20.	"I Am the Walker"
21.	"Ostrich Man"
22.	"Sweet Helen"
23.	"How Does It Feel To Feel (US version)"

Disc 2

No.	Title	Performer	Length
1.	"Hurt Me If You Will"	The Mark Four
2.	"I'm Leaving"	The Mark Four
3.	"Work All Day (Sleep All Night)"	The Mark Four
4.	"Going Down Fast"	The Mark Four
5.	"How Does It Feel To Feel (US version - New Stereo Mix)"
6.	"Biff, Bang, Pow (New Stereo Mix)"
7.	"For All That I Am (New Stereo Mix)"
8.	"Can I Join Your Band (New Stereo Mix)"
9.	"Through My Eyes (New Stereo Mix)"
10.	"Tom Tom (New Stereo Mix)"
11.	"Midway Down (New Stereo Mix)"
12.	"Nightmares (New Stereo Mix)"
13.	"Life Is Just Beginning (New Stereo Mix)"
14.	"Painter Man (New Stereo Mix)"
15.	"If I Stay Too Long (New Stereo Mix)"
16.	"How Does It Feel To Feel (UK version - New Stereo Mix)"
17.	"Cool Jerk (New Stereo Mix)"
18.	"Hey Joe (New Stereo Mix)"
19.	"Like A Rolling Stone (New Stereo Mix)"
20.	"Making Time (backing track) take 1"
21.	"Sylvette (full length)"
22.	"Instrumental I"
23.	"How Does It Feel To Feel (version I) (backing track)"
