= Green Bullfrog =

Album produced by Derek Lawrence

Studio album by Green Bullfrog
- Released: 19 March 1971
- Recorded: 20 April & 23 May 1970; 4 January 1971
- Studio: De Lane Lea, London
- Genre: Blues
- Label: Decca
- Producer: Derek Lawrence

Green Bullfrog is a blues album recorded by an ad hoc band and produced by Derek Lawrence. The bulk of the album was recorded over two sessions at De Lane Lea Studios, London in 1970, with later string and brass overdubs. It was originally released in 1971, with reissues in 1980 and 1991.

The album listed pseudonyms in the credits for contractual reasons and was commercially unsuccessful. The musicians were eventually confirmed as including Deep Purple's Ritchie Blackmore and Ian Paice, Procol Harum's Matthew Fisher, Chas & Dave's Chas Hodges and session guitarists Albert Lee and Big Jim Sullivan.

== Background ==
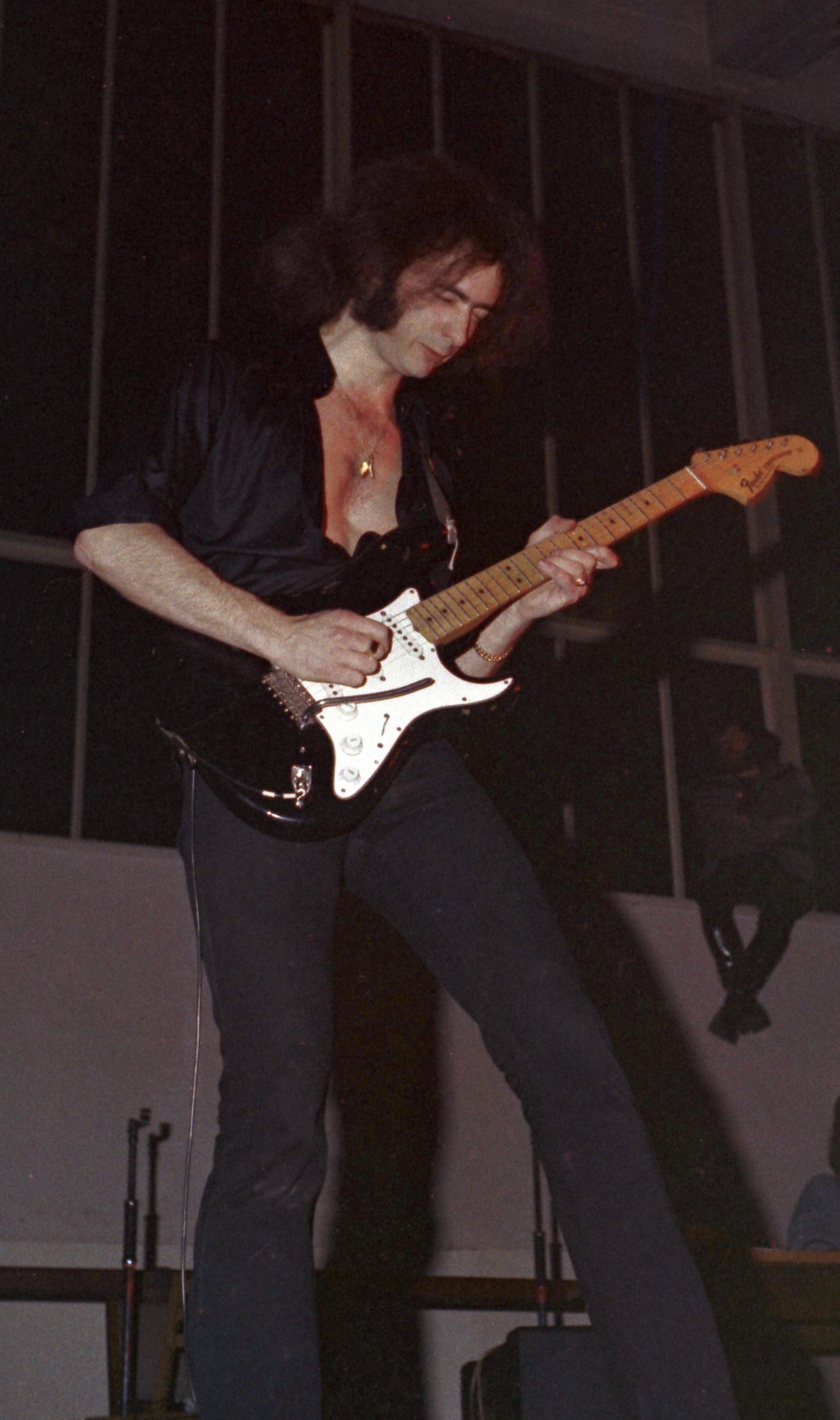
Deep Purple's Ritchie Blackmore attended the two Green Bullfrog sessions.

Green Bullfrog was the idea of producer Derek Lawrence, who assembled a group of musicians with whom he had worked in the 1960s. Guitarist Albert Lee had been working with Lawrence as a session player, and the original idea had been to record with former Screaming Lord Sutch bassist Tony Dangerfield. However, the sessions did not work out, so the pair decided to invite other session musicians and Sutch alumni and record a studio jam.

The backing tracks were recorded in two overnight sessions on 20 April and 23 May 1970 at De Lane Lea Studios, London, starting at 11 pm. It was recorded live into four track tape. Deep Purple and former Sutch guitarist Ritchie Blackmore had previously worked with Lawrence and brought along their drummer Ian Paice. According to Lee, Blackmore and Paice arrived at the studio directly from Deep Purple gigs on both occasions. Session guitarist Big Jim Sullivan was invited as he had originally taught Blackmore how to play guitar and was greatly admired by him. Guitarist Rod Alexander was friends with Blackmore and worked in a music shop on Charing Cross Road. He arrived at the session to deliver some guitar strings and was persuaded to stay. All the musicians had wanted to play together for some time, but were too busy with touring or session work to do so. Singer Earl Jordan had been recording with the Les Humphries Singers. He put down guide vocals during the main session, then re-recorded all his parts after everyone else had left. Strings and brass overdubs were added on 4 January 1971.

A few originals (penned by Lawrence) were played, as well as many blues-inflected cover versions. Sullivan rearranged Lawrence's "Lovin' You (Is Good for Me Baby)" in 17/9 compound time to make it more interesting to play. The guitar workout instrumental "Bullfrog" is a Deep Purple song "Jam Stew", which had been previously recorded at a BBC Radio 1 session. Blackmore played the main riff once to Sullivan and Lee, who both immediately created guitar harmonies around it. The track also features Tony Ashton on Hammond organ. The sessions also included a cover of the Creation's "Makin' Time", which Blackmore and Lawrence had both wanted to record. Lawrence selected all the other songs for everyone to record.

For contractual reasons, the musicians were billed under pseudonyms. Lee was called "Pinta" after an in-joke where he would say "I'm only delivering the milk!" when a second take of a song was requested. Ashton was called "Bevy" because he liked to keep bottles of light ale under his organ. Bassist Chas Hodges (who previously played with Blackmore in the Outlaws and would later be one half of Chas & Dave) took the name "Sleepy" due to his habit of falling asleep at sessions. Blackmore was called "Boots" because he frequently wore suede cowboy boots, while Sullivan was nicknamed "The Boss" due to his respect from the others as one of the best session players. Procol Harum's Matthew Fisher, who played piano on the album, was named "Sorry" after his reputation of apologising if another take was required. Alexander was called "The Vicar" after Lawrence's habit of saying "hello, vicar" to him, while Paice was nicknamed "Speedy" owing to his fast playing style. Despite rumours at the time, Roger Glover and Jon Lord did not attend any of the sessions.

== Release ==
Professional ratings
Review scores
Source	Rating
AllMusic	2.5/5 stars

The title Green Bullfrog was chosen by Lawrence. Hodges later said it was because Lawrence wanted to name every project after a colour. The first release of the session was on 19 March 1971 in the US by Decca Records, as well as a single coupling the tracks "My Baby Left Me" and "Lovin' You Is Good for Me, Baby". It was issued in the UK by MCA Records in March 1972 after Lawrence played some tracks to company president Mike Maitland. However, Maitland had left the company by the time the album was released, so it had little promotion and was commercially unsuccessful.

The album was re-released in 1980 under ECY Street Records in the US. The reissue had additional sleeve notes written by Ed Chapero. The front cover had a quote from Blackmore taken from an interview with Guitar Player magazine in September 1978, which correctly identified himself, Paice, Lee and Sullivan on the album but mistakenly credited Glover. Both Blackmore and Glover were unimpressed with the front cover quotation. It was remixed at Abbey Road Studios, London in 1991 by Lawrence and engineer Peter Vince and reissued on LP and CD. The re-release contained extra tracks not on the original release, and additional information and sleeve notes including an interview with Lawrence. It was the first release that properly credited all the musicians. Four tracks recorded by Green Bullfrog have been published on the 2005 Blackmore compilation Get Away – Groups and Sessions.

Dave Thompson gave a retrospective review on AllMusic which was mixed, praising the quality of musicians, but felt there was "little [...] to truly engage the attention".

== Track listing ==
=== LP ===
Taken from the sleeve notes

Side one

1. "My Baby Left Me" (Arthur Crudup)
2. "Makin' Time" (Eddie Phillips, Kenny Pickett)
3. "Lawdy Miss Clawdy" (Lloyd Price)
4. "Bullfrog" (Derek Lawrence, Ritchie Blackmore, Ian Paice) (Note: Credited to Lawrence alone on the original LP)

Side two

1. "I Want You" (Tony Joe White)
2. "I'm a Free Man" (Mark "Moogy" Klingman)
3. "Walk a Mile in My Shoes" (Joe South)
4. "Lovin' You Is Good for Me Baby" (Lawrence/Corlett/Hutton)

=== CD reissue ===
Tracks marked * are on the original LP.

1. "Ain't Nobody Home" (Jerry Ragovoy)
2. "Bullfrog" (Derek Lawrence, Ritchie Blackmore, Ian Paice)*
3. "Walk a Mile in My Shoes" (Joe South)*
4. "My Baby Left Me" (Arthur Crudup)*
5. "Makin' Time" (Eddie Phillips, Kenny Pickett)*
6. "Lawdy Miss Clawdy" (Lloyd Price)*
7. "I'm a Free Man" (Mark "Moogy" Klingman)*
8. "Lovin' You Is Good for Me Baby" (Lawrence/Corlett/Hutton)*
9. "I Want You" (Tony Joe White)*
10. "Louisiana Man" (Doug Kershaw)
11. "Who Do You Love?" (Ellas McDaniel)

== Personnel ==
- "Speedy" (Ian Paice) – drums
- "Sleepy" (Chas Hodges) – bass
- "Bevy" (Tony Ashton) – piano / organ
- "Sorry" (Matthew Fisher) – piano
- "Boots" (Ritchie Blackmore) – guitar
- "Pinta" (Albert Lee) – guitar
- "The Boss" (Big Jim Sullivan) – guitar
- "The Vicar" (Rod Alexander) – guitar
- "Jordan" (Earl Jordan) – vocals

Production

- Derek Lawrence – producer
- Martin Birch – engineer
