= We Are Paintermen =

Studio album by the Creation
- Released: June 1967
- Recorded: 18 May 1966 – 7 June 1967
- Studio: IBC; Olympic; Pye Studios
- Genre: Freakbeat; psychedelic rock; garage rock; hard rock
- Length: 33:40
- Label: Hit-Ton
- Producer: Shel Talmy

The Creation chronology
We Are Paintermen (1967)	Power Surge (1996)

We Are Paintermen is the debut studio album by British rock band the Creation, initially released through Hit-Ton records in West Germany and Sonet Records in Denmark in June 1967. The album acts as a compilation album, containing virtually all their recorded material, from "Making Time" in 1966 to "If I Stay Too Long", which was released as a single in West Germany the same month. It also marks the gap between lead vocalists, whereas the earlier material feature Kenny Pickett on vocals, while the later feature Bob Garner, their previous bassist, on vocals.

The album was the only one issued during the group's original tenure, and was their only release for 29 years until Power Surge was released in 1996. Upon release, the album was largely ignored, though it retrospectively received acclaim and praise. Since release, the album has been re-issued multiple times, most notably by Numero Group in 2018.

== Background and release ==
The Creation had been founded in April 1966 out of the Mark Four, upon recruiting bassist Bob Garner and signing to Shel Talmy's record label Planet Records. The single "Making Time" written by lead vocalist Kenny Pickett and guitarist Eddie Phillips was released in June of that year, and reached number 49 on the UK Singles Chart. Almost immediately after, this line-up suffered an instability, where drummer Jack Jones was fired and replaced by Dave Preston, who after only three weeks once again got replaced by Jones. Nonetheless, the band released another single in October which became "Painter Man", this was their biggest hit in the UK, where it reached number 36 and received favorable reviews in the press. The band then commenced on another tour, in which more instabilities arose. Pickett, who had grown tired of touring, quit the band. It was later revealed to later to partly be due to his clashes with Garner. Reportedly, when Pickett returned to a rehearsal, he saw that Garner had replaced him as a lead vocalist and that Kim Gardner had in return taken over Garner's previous position in the band. Pickett left without a fuss and never returned.

Following Pickett's departure, Garner started writing songs together with Phillips, including later singles. However, chart success finally came for the Creation through "Painter Man", which reached number 8 on the West German Media Control Singles Chart in April 1967. After this, a Phillips–Garner song, "Tom Tom", was released as a single there; it reached number 14. In response to this, the German distributor of the Creation's records, Hit-Ton, acquired the master tapes for most of the group's recordings, and released them as We Are Paintermen. This album was only issued in one other territory upon 1967, which was Denmark in which it was distributed through Sonet Records. It was supposed to receive an 8-track tape release in the United States, an idea which never materialized. The album was never issued in the United Kingdom, and sold poorly in both West Germany and Denmark which after a few more singles, prompted the original reincarnation of the Creation to break up.

== Reception ==
Professional ratings
Review scores
Source	Rating
AllMusic	4/5 stars
The Encyclopedia of Popular Music	3/5 stars

Upon release, the album was largely ignored as it sold poorly. However, after the Creation's resurgence in the 1990s, it has started receiving more positive reviews and attention. Writing for AllMusic, Bruce Eder states that the album "ended up being better than anyone could have anticipated", noting the includation of the covers, calling "Like a Rolling Stone" "crunchy" while also comparing their rendition of "Hey Joe" to that of Jimi Hendrix. In a review for the album on the same website, Erik Hage writes that the covers seemed "uninspired" but that the group's "under-appreciated sound" largely fueled by Phillips guitar playing, and also puts "Try and Stop Me", "If I Stay Too Long", "Biff, Bang, Pow" and "Painter Man" as highlights. He negatively noted the sound quality of the original release, and gave it four out of five stars. Colin Larkin, writer of The Encyclopedia of Popular Music, gave the album three out of five stars.

Ned Lannamann of Portland Mercury writes that the album is a "hodgepodge" due to the contrast of materials on it. He praises the original compositions on it, but writes negatively about the covers, one of which, "Like A Rolling Stone", doesn't feature the right chord progression. He had previously included the album on his list of "100 (More) Great Weed-Friendly Albums" as an addition to his list of "Great Stoner Albums You Need to Hear". Owen Bailey of Guitar.com writes that We Are Paintermen acts as a collection for the Creation's most essential songs, positively noting the material on it.

== Track listing ==
All songs written by Eddie Phillips and Kenny Pickett unless noted.

Side one
No.	Title	Writer(s)	Lead vocals	Length
1.	"Cool Jerk"	Donald Storball	Bob Garner	2:13
2.	"Making Time"		Kenny Pickett	2:53
3.	"Through My Eyes"	Eddie Phillips; Bob Garner	Garner	2:58
4.	"Like A Rolling Stone"	Bob Dylan	Garner	2:53
5.	"Can I Join Your Band"		Eddie Phillips	2:55
6.	"Tom Tom"	Phillips; Garner	Garner	2:54
Total length:				16:46

Side two
No.	Title	Writer(s)	Lead vocals	Length
1.	"Try and Stop Me"		Pickett	2:23
2.	"If I Stay Too Long"	Phillips; Garner	Garner	3:15
3.	"Biff, Bang, Pow"		Pickett	2:21
4.	"Nightmares"		Garner	3:05
5.	"Hey Joe"	Traditional; arranged by Eddie Phillips	Phillips	3:02
6.	"Painter Man"		Pickett	2:48
Total length:				16:54

== Personnel ==
The Creation

- Kenny Pickett – lead vocals (2, 7, 9, 12)
- Eddie Phillips – guitar, backing vocals, lead vocals (5, 11)
- Bob Garner – lead vocals (1, 3–4, 6, 8, 10), bass guitar and backing vocals (2, 7, 9, 12)
- Jack Jones – drums
- Kim Gardner – bass guitar, backing vocals (1, 3–6, 8, 10–11)

Other personnel

- Nicky Hopkins – piano (1, 3–6, 9–12), tack piano and organ on "If I Stay Too Long"
- Steve Aldo – backing vocals on "Try and Stop Me"

== Sources ==
- Larkin, Colin (2011). The Encyclopedia of Popular Music. Omnibus Press. p. 402. ISBN 9780857125958.
