= Seconds of Pleasure =

Studio album by Rockpile
- Released: October 1980
- Recorded: 1980
- Studio: Eden Studios, Chiswick
- Genre: Pub rock, power pop, rockabilly, new wave
- Length: 43:32
- Label: Columbia
- Producer: Nick Lowe and Rockpile

Professional ratings
Review scores
Source	Rating
AllMusic	5/5 stars
Christgau's Record Guide	A−
Entertainment Weekly	A−
Record Mirror	4/5 stars
Rolling Stone	4/5 stars
Smash Hits	8/10
Spin Alternative Record Guide	7/10

Seconds of Pleasure is a 1980 album by Rockpile, a band consisting of guitarists/vocalists Dave Edmunds and Billy Bremner, bassist/vocalist Nick Lowe, and drummer Terry Williams. The band had played together on various solo albums by Edmunds and Lowe in previous years, but Seconds of Pleasure would be the first (and only) album released under the Rockpile name.

The album's opening track, "Teacher, Teacher", became a minor hit on the Billboard Hot 100. The song was written by Kenny Pickett and Eddie Phillips, both of whom were former members of the 1960s British rock band The Creation. The song appears in the opening credits of the 2011 film, Bad Teacher.

"(Wrong Again) Let’s Face It” is a cover of the Squeeze song that was given away as a flexi-disc on the cover of the 4 October 1979 edition of Smash Hits.

A four-song EP, Nick Lowe & Dave Edmunds Sing the Everly Brothers, was included in the first pressings of the LP; the songs were later included on the album's various CD versions.

The front cover is a painting by the designer Barney Bubbles, who used pseudonyms and rarely signed his work. This is signed "Dag".

== LP track listing ==
All songs written by Rockpile, unless otherwise indicated.

=== Side one ===
1. "Teacher, Teacher" (K. Pickett, E. Phillips) – 2:36 lead vocal: Lowe
2. "If Sugar Was As Sweet As You" (J. Tex) – 2:35 lead vocal: Edmunds
3. "Heart" – 2:38 lead vocal: Bremner
4. "Now and Always" – 1:58 lead vocal: Lowe and Edmunds
5. "A Knife and a Fork" (K. Anderson, Isaiah Hennie, Charles Derrick) – 3:18 lead vocal: Edmunds
6. "Play That Fast Thing (One More Time)" (N. Lowe) – 4:13 lead vocal: Lowe

=== Side two ===
1. "Wrong Again (Let's Face It)" (C. Difford, G. Tilbrook) – 2:23 lead vocal: Edmunds
2. "Pet You and Hold You" – 3:13 lead vocal: Lowe
3. "Oh What a Thrill" (C. Berry) – 3:06 lead vocal: Edmunds
4. "When I Write the Book" – 3:17 lead vocal: Lowe
5. "Fool Too Long" – 2:51 lead vocal: Edmunds
6. "You Ain't Nothin' But Fine" (F. Simien, F. Soileau) – 2:54 lead vocal: Bremner

=== Bonus EP tracks (Nick Lowe & Dave Edmunds Sing The Everly Brothers) ===
produced by Nick Lowe & Dave Edmunds

1. "Take a Message to Mary" (F. Bryant, B. Bryant) – 2:28
2. "Crying in the Rain" (H. Greenfield, C. King) – 2:04
3. "Poor Jenny" (F. Bryant, B. Bryant) – 2:28
4. "When Will I Be Loved" (P. Everly) – 2:14

=== CD reissue bonus tracks (2004) ===
1. "Back to Schooldays" [Live] (G. Parker) – 3:31 produced by Jeff Griffin
2. "They Called It Rock" [Live] – 3:20 produced by Jeff Griffin
3. "Crawling from the Wreckage" [Live] (G. Parker) – 3:07 produced by Chris Thomas

== Personnel ==
- Billy Bremner – guitar, vocals
- Dave Edmunds – guitar, vocals, piano, organ
- Nick Lowe – bass, vocals
- Terry Williams – drums
- Aldo Bocca – engineer

== Charts ==
Album

Year	Chart	Position
1980	Billboard 200	27

Single

Year	Song	Chart	Position
1981	"Teacher Teacher"	Billboard Hot 100	51
