= Bowed guitar =

Method of playing a guitar

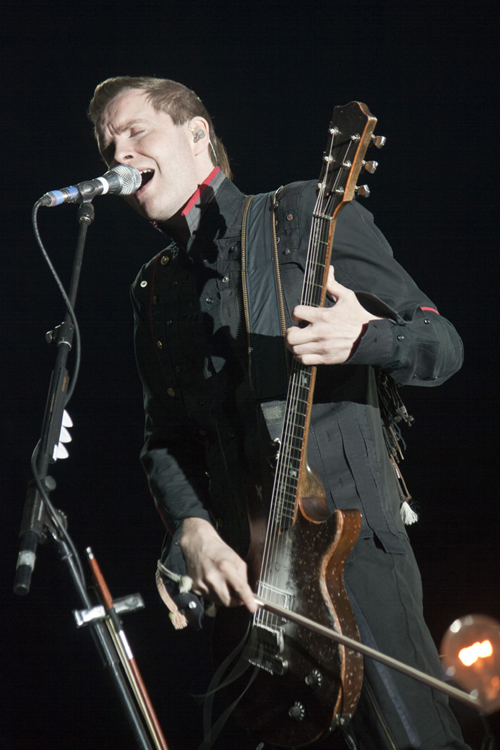
Jónsi of Sigur Rós playing bowed guitar at the DCode Fest in Madrid in 2012

Bowed guitar is a method of playing a guitar, acoustic or electric, in which the guitarist uses a bow, rather than the more common plectrum, to vibrate the instruments' strings, similar to playing a viola da gamba. Unlike traditionally bowed instruments such as violins, the guitar generally has a relatively flat bridge radius and closely positioned strings, making it difficult to bow individual notes on the middle strings. The technique is often associated with Jimmy Page of Led Zeppelin and the Yardbirds, as well as Jónsi of Sigur Rós. Eddie Phillips of the British group the Creation was one of the first rock guitarists to use a bow in their 1966 song "Making Time".

== Pickaso Technique ==
The Pickaso Technique refers to a unique method of bowed guitar playing introduced with the Pickaso Guitar Bow. Unlike traditional bows, which struggle with the guitar’s flat fingerboard radius, this technique allows players to move the bow within the guitar’s sound hole area, effectively bowing individual or dual strings on acoustic guitars. The Guitar Bow has slim design, featuring hair on both sides, enables sustained tones and greater control over single-string or double-string bowing, expanding the guitar's expressive range.

Guitar Bow on Acoustic Guitar

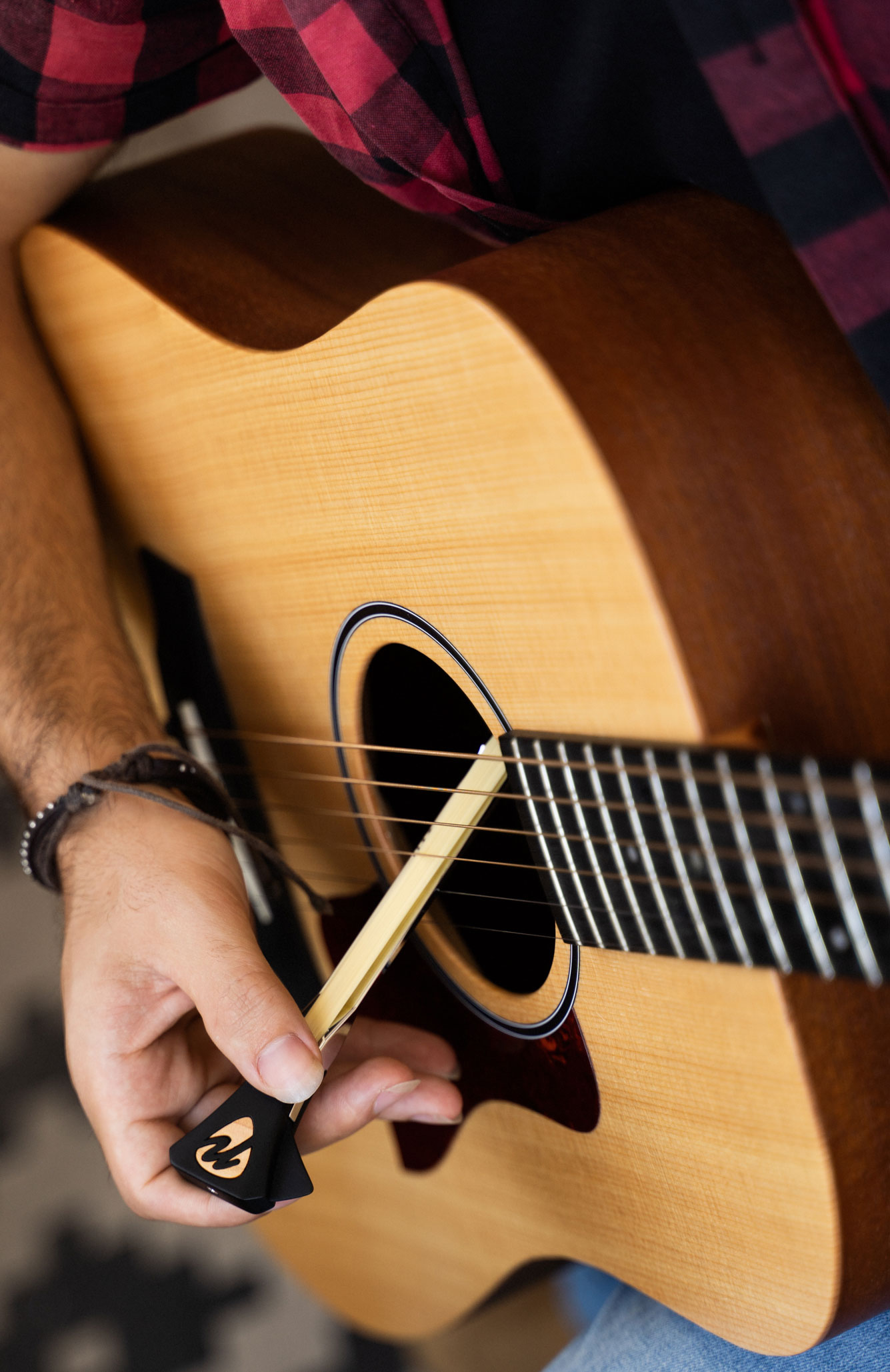
Guitar Bow in playing position on acoustic guitar

== Bowed guitar players ==
- Eddie Phillips was one of the first 20th century guitarists to use a bow. His bowed guitar can be heard on The Creation's "Making Time".
- Jimmy Page, of Led Zeppelin and The Yardbirds, is perhaps one of the most famous bowed guitar players. His bowed guitar can be heard on the songs "Dazed and Confused" and "How Many More Times" from the album Led Zeppelin, "In the Light" from the album Physical Graffiti, and "In the Evening" from the album In Through the Out Door.
- Jónsi (Jón Þór Birgisson), the vocalist and guitarist for the Icelandic post-rock band Sigur Rós, uses a bowed guitar extensively.
- Jonny Greenwood, lead guitarist of Radiohead, plays bowed guitar live on "Burn the Witch" and "Pyramid Song" to make sounds similar to whale cries (his brother Colin Greenwood used to make them on double bass). With the Smile he plays bowed guitar on "Colours Fly" and plays bass guitar with a bow on "A Hairdryer".
- Jeff Martin of the Canadian rock band The Tea Party plays bowed guitar on some of his earlier songs such as "Save Me", from the album Splendor Solis.
- Sonic Youth's Lee Ranaldo plays bowed guitar on occasion, most notably in the intro to "Hey Joni".
- The Besnard Lakes also make use of bowed guitar. Avant-garde composer Scott Fields often uses bows, including modified bows, in performance and on recordings, including "Mamet", "From the Diary of Dog Drexel", "We Were the Phliks", and "Beckett".
- Claudio Sanchez from the American rock band Coheed and Cambria often uses a bow during live performances.
- Pink Floyd's Roger Waters used a bowed bass guitar on the songs "Lucifer Sam" and "The Scarecrow".
- Lee Jackson of The Nice used a bowed bass guitar on the songs "Intermezzo from the Karelia Suite," "Hang on to a Dream," and "My Back Pages."
- Tim McTague of Underoath uses a bow in the songs "Writing on the Walls," "To Whom It May Concern," and "Casting Such a Thin Shadow."
- English instrumentalist and composer Mike Oldfield played bowed guitar on his album Amarok.
- Skyler Skjelset of Fleet Foxes uses a bow on live performances of "Drops in the River" and "I Am All That I Need / Arroyo Seco / Thumbprint Scar".
- Russell Senior of Pulp used a bow on live performances of "Little Girl (With Blue Eyes)".
- Italian guitarist Sergio Altamura^{[it]} frequently uses a bow and in some pieces applies a violin bridge to his guitar for that or uses a self-created electronic bow.
- Whitesnake's Adrian Vandenberg and Steve Vai used a bow in the song "Still of the Night" during live performance.
- Igor Haefeli, guitarist of Daughter, uses a bow on the songs "Love", "Still" and "Lifeforms".
- Cliff Williams of AC/DC played a bowed bass with his previous band, Home, on the song "Lady of the Birds".
- Mike McCready of Pearl Jam played a bowed guitar on the song "Pendulum" from the album Lightning Bolt.
- Kristoffer Lo of Highasakite was seen using a bow on his guitar during a live performance of the song "Lover, where do you live?"
- Þorbjörn Steingrímsson of the Icelandic black/death metal act Zhrine uses a bow on multiple songs both in-studio and live.
- Kris Angylus (Kristopher Fairchild) of the drone doom band The Angelic Process used a bow on the guitar for much of the band's music.

== See also ==
- EBow
- Arpeggione
