= Makin' Time (band) =

British band

Makin' Time were a British band from the Black Country towns of Willenhall, Wolverhampton and West Bromwich in the West Midlands, signed to the Countdown Records label and licensed through Stiff Records, and were part of the mod revival scene of the 1980s. They were named after "Making Time", a 1966 song by The Creation.

The band consisted of four members - Mark McGounden (vocals/guitar), Fay Hallam (organ/vocals), Martin Blunt (bass) and Neil Clitheroe (drums).

Their debut single "Here Is My Number" was produced by Pat Collier who had previously worked with Katrina and the Waves. The band released a number of albums and several singles, but never managed to convert their energetic sound into chart success.

Martin Blunt would go on to perform in The Charlatans, Fay Hallam moved into a solo career and as of 2020 is a member of The Catenary Wires. Mark McGounden formed the power pop band The Upper Fifth, and is currently in The Deep Six.

== Discography ==
=== Albums ===
- Rhythm and Soul (1985; Stiff Records/Countdown/Ariston)
- No Lumps of Fat or Gristle Guaranteed (1986; Ready to Eat/Fab Records/Big Beat Records)
- Makin' Time - Time, Trouble and Money - Live at the 100 Club (1987; Re-Elect the President/Detour Records)
- Unchain My Heart (1988; Fab Records)
- Rhythm! The Complete Countdown Recordings (2013; Ace Records)
