= Painter Man =

Kenny Pickett and Eddie Phillips song

- German picture sleeve (on "Hit-ton")

Single by The Creation

from the album We Are Paintermen
- B-side: "Biff, Bang, Pow"
- Released: 7 October 1966
- Recorded: 23 August 1966
- Studio: IBC Studios, London
- Genre: Power pop; art pop; avant-pop
- Length: 2:53
- Label: Planet
- Songwriters: Kenny Pickett; Eddie Phillips
- Producer: Shel Talmy

The Creation singles chronology
"Making Time" (1966)	"Painter Man" (1966)	"If I Stay too Long" (1967)

"Painter Man" is a song written by British singer Kenny Pickett and guitarist Eddie Phillips, and first recorded by their group the Creation. It was released as a single in October 1966. Written as a response to their avant-garde stage show, the single was their only top-forty hit on the UK Singles Chart, reaching number 36. It fared better in West Germany, where it reached number eight. It was later issued on their album We Are Paintermen.

One of the Creation's most well-known and popular compositions, the song has been covered by several artists. The first cover was that of the New Zealand band Larry's Rebels, who in 1967 took the song to number six on Kent Music Report. A later version by Boney M. reached the top-ten worldwide, including in the UK.

== Background and composition ==
A few weeks after the group released "Making Time", the first major line-up change occurred when drummer Jack Jones was terminated, being replaced by Dave Preston, a friend of bassist Bob Garner who Pickett believed to be phenomenal. His first scheduled gig with the Creation was on a tour with the Walker Brothers, after which it was revealed after only a few select weeks that his drumming wasn't to the standard Pickett had hoped for. Although Preston had time to partake in a photoshoot with the band, he was swiftly replaced by Jones once again, who stayed with the band until their demise towards early 1968. Jones would hold a grudge against Pickett for this decision until the latter left the band in early 1967.

"Ken [Pickett] loved the cynical side of life. Went to college, studied art, be an artist, make a start. He had a vision of somebody who tried to do it the right way but found themselves doing adverts on TV and labels round cans. It was great for the song.”

— Eddie Phillips, Record Collector interview

According to the pop magazine Beat Instrumental, "Painter Man" was written by the duo as a response to their stage act, which involved Pickett painting a canvas during song numbers, occasionally burning it. According to their manager Tony Stratton Smith, they did this because "they felt like it", with Phillips adding that "their music was visual" as much as it was musical. Lyrically, the song revolves around a "suppressed" artist, through lines that indicates that he went through a college education that only led him to obscurity. It also revolves around the endless debate of art in commercialism which is referred to through lines such as "adverts on TV." It ends with the note that classical art is dead. Musically, the song has a less raunchy sound than "Making Time" and is softer, but still features Phillips in one of the earliest recorded bowed guitar parts, which prevails throughout the entire composition.

Shortly after Jones was reinstated into the group, they returned to IBC Studios on Portland Place in London on 23 August 1966. Together with producer Shel Talmy who had signed and recorded them, they cut two songs that day, "Painter Man" and what would eventually become its B-side, "Biff, Bang, Pow". The session marked the first time the group were assisted by studio musician Nicky Hopkins who played keyboards on both songs, further strengthening their connection with the Who as Hopkins had played on several of their recordings. "Painter Man" was recorded in ten takes, out of which only two, takes three and seven, were complete. Take 7 was chosen as the master, which was compiled and mixed on 25 August by Talmy.

== Release and reception ==
Released on 7 October 1966, the single managed to enter the UK Singles Chart, entering on 9 November 1966 at a position of 38. The following week, it peaked at number 36 before exiting the chart altogether, becoming their only top-forty hit. In West Germany, the single managed to peak at number eight on 4 January 1967, and became their sole top-ten hit in the country. The single received mostly positive reviews from critics, with Record Mirror critics Norman Jopling and Peter Jones writing it that it has an "avant-garde pop group sound", noting the droning of the bowed guitar. Writing for Disc & Music Echo, Penny Valentine states that she thought the song had a great "looning-about atmosphere" and drew parallels to records by both the Beatles and the Who. Regarding the song, Phillips has later stated that "We see our music as colours – it's purple with red flashes."

In retrospective assessments of the song, many critics have noted the fact that Phillips used a bow prior to Jimmy Page of Led Zeppelin. David Luhrssen and Michael Larson called the song "humorous", while Owen Bailey wrote that the song had a "superb riff" and compared it with the guitar playing of Pete Townshend, also noting the violin-bowed solo. Doug Collette of Glide Magazine writes that song is instantly recognizable due to the vocal harmonies and energetic rhythm section. Kieron Tyler thought that "Painter Man" ranked among the best and most innovative recordings of the 1960s. Jerome Estèbe of TDG stated that "Painter Man" was one of the best things that could happen to English rock. Ian Canty considered it an "art-pop nugget," while Beverly Paterson similarly stated that it a "brash and bouncy nugget." AllMusic critic Bruce Eder called the track a "cheerfully trippy pop anthem", while Richie Unterberger wrote that the song was elevated because of its musical arrangement, noting its similarity with records by the Who, while also suggesting that Phillips attempted to play his guitar "like it's a classical violin".

Nonetheless, "Painter Man" became one of the Creation's best known songs, and was often used as their stage finale. A young citizen, Günther Zettl, from East Germany recognized the song in 1969 during a contest by the West German AM station Europawelle Saar, where the listeners were requested to send a card with the song title and band to win the single. He sent off a postcard, which was intercepted by the Stasi and resulted in permanent surveillance until 1989. In 2013, after he got his Stasi reports, he sent the card again and, during the celebration of "50 years Europawelle" in 2014, he finally received his prize.

== Personnel ==
- Kenny Pickett – lead vocals
- Eddie Phillips – lead and bowed guitar, backing vocals
- Bob Garner – bass, backing vocals
- Jack Jones – drums, backing vocals
- Nicky Hopkins – piano

== Charts ==
Chart performance for "Painter Man"
Chart (1966–67)	Peak position
UK Singles (Record Retailer)	36
Disc & Music Echo Top 50	20
West German Media Control Singles Chart	8
New Musical Express Top 30	22

== Boney M. version ==
"Painter Man"

Single by Boney M.

from the album Nightflight to Venus
- A-side: "Rasputin" (Europe)
- B-side: "He Was a Steppenwolf" (UK)
- Released: 23 February 1979
- Recorded: 1978
- Genre: Pop rock; Euro disco
- Length: 3:10
- Label: Atlantic
- Songwriters: Pickett; Phillips
- Producer: Frank Farian

Boney M. singles chronology
"Mary's Boy Child - Oh My Lord" (1978)	"Painter Man" (1979)	"Hooray! Hooray! It's a Holi-Holiday" (1979)

Audio video
- "Painter Man" on YouTube

"Painter Man" was later covered in 1978 by German-Caribbean pop group Boney M., in a cover which became successful throughout Europe. The group's producer, Frank Farian was active on the German music scene during most of the 1960s and 1970s, leading to him influencing the choice of songs for the group to record, including both "Painter Man" and "My Friend Jack" by the Smoke, a band that suffered a similar fate to that of the Creation. The song was initially released on their third studio album Nightflight to Venus released on 28 July 1978, but was not issued as a single at the time. However, shortly after the release, "Rasputin" and "Painter Man" were released as a double A-Side in most of mainland Europe. However, in the UK, along with some other European countries, "Rasputin" and "Painter Man" were released separately, with "He Was a Steppenwolf" added to the UK release, which was issued on 23 February 1979.

The single was a success in the UK, entering the chart on 3 March 1979 at a position of 26. The following week, it had reached its peak of number ten, and the single was last seen on 7 April at a position of 59, when it had spent six weeks on the chart. Although it became the first Creation song to enter the top-ten in any form, it was not successful by Boney M.'s standards, as both "Mary's Boy Child – Oh My Lord", which had been released before, and "Hooray! Hooray! It's a Holi-Holiday", both had reached the top-three of the chart (number one and three respectively).AllMusic critic Donald A. Guarisco wrote that Boney M.'s rendition of "Painter Man" had "distorted hard rock guitar riffs" that contrasted to the beat of the song.

Eddie Phillips was apparently completely unaware of Boney M's cover of the song. In an interview for Guitarist magazine, Phillips acknowledged that he first knew about the song's existence after watching them perform the song on an episode of the Seaside Special!. Of the incident, Phillips commented "“Strange, really exciting. 'Cos although they gave it a completely different treatment to what we did – I mean it was a disco song all of a sudden! But it was good, it was quite exciting really.” In an interview with Creation Records, Phillips claimed he has been able to live comfortably with the royalties from Boney M.'s version of the song, stating that it sold seven million copies.

=== Charts ===
Chart (1978–79)	Peak position
Belgium (Ultratop 50 Wallonia)	1
Finland (Suomen virallinen lista)	7
France (French Singles & Airplay Chart Reviews)	3
Ireland (IRMA)	5
Netherlands (Dutch Top 40)	8
Netherlands (Single Top 100)	5
UK Singles (Official Charts Company)	10

== Other covers ==
- It was first covered in New Zealand by the kiwi band Larry's Rebels in April 1967, where it reached number six in the New Zealand Listener music charts on 30 June 1967. However, when a listener complained about the lyrics "household soap" and "tin cans" (erroneously believing it to be "shit cans") the chart success of the single was abruptly halted.
- In 1977, the Hard rock German band Mass also made a cover on their first album Back to the Music keeping the same title (Painter Man).
- The song was also covered by British post-punk band The Television Personalities, appearing on their 1982 album They Could Have Been Bigger than the Beatles. The song was called "enthusiastically sloppy" in an AllMusic review by Stewart Mason.
