= Kate Malone =

British ceramic artist

Kate Olivia Malone MBE (born 29 January 1959, in London) is a British ceramic artist known for her large sculptural vessels and rich, bright glazes. Malone was previously a judge, along with Keith Brymer Jones, on BBC2's The Great Pottery Throw Down (2015–2017), then presented by Sara Cox.

== Biography ==
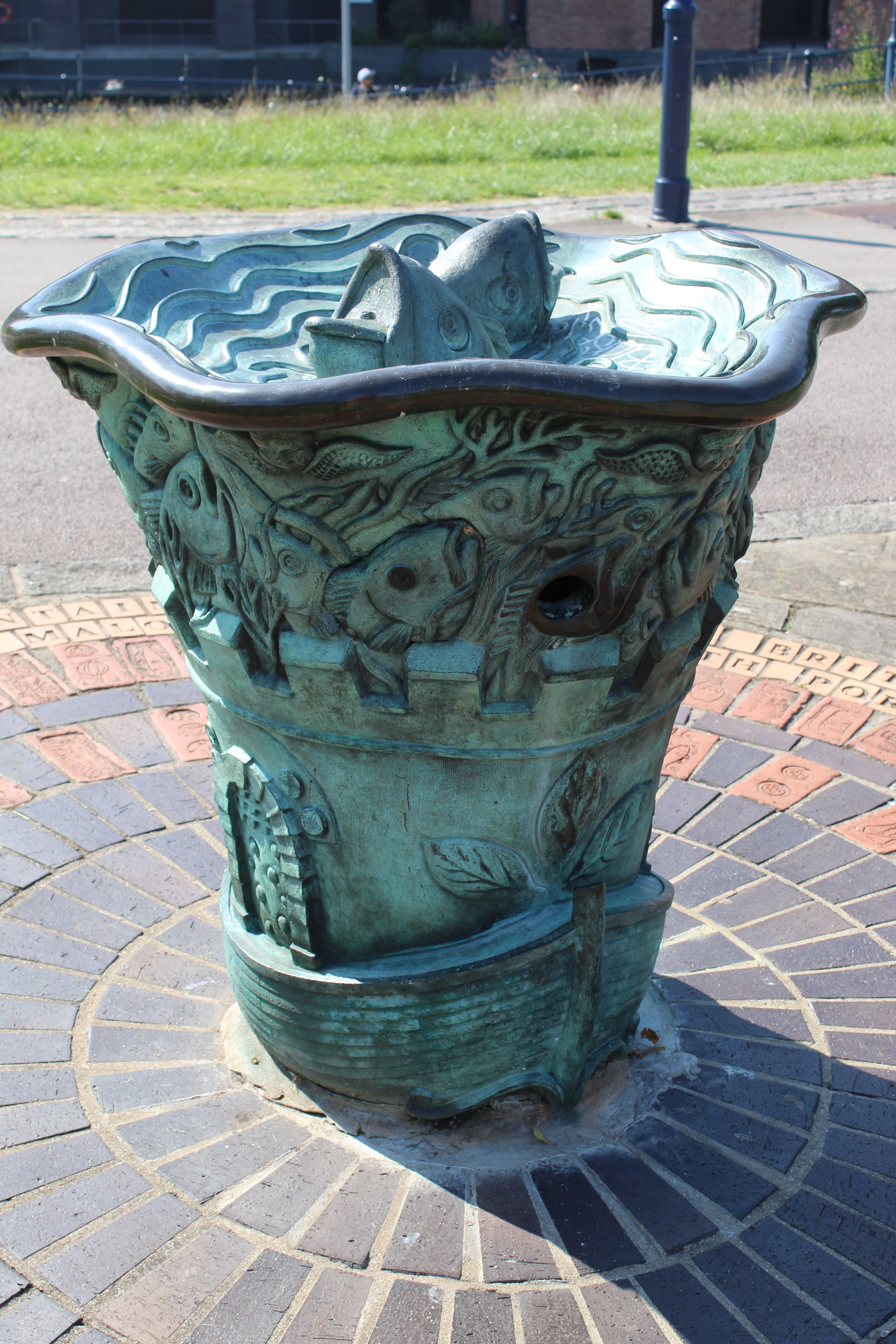
Fish by Malone in Castle Park, Bristol

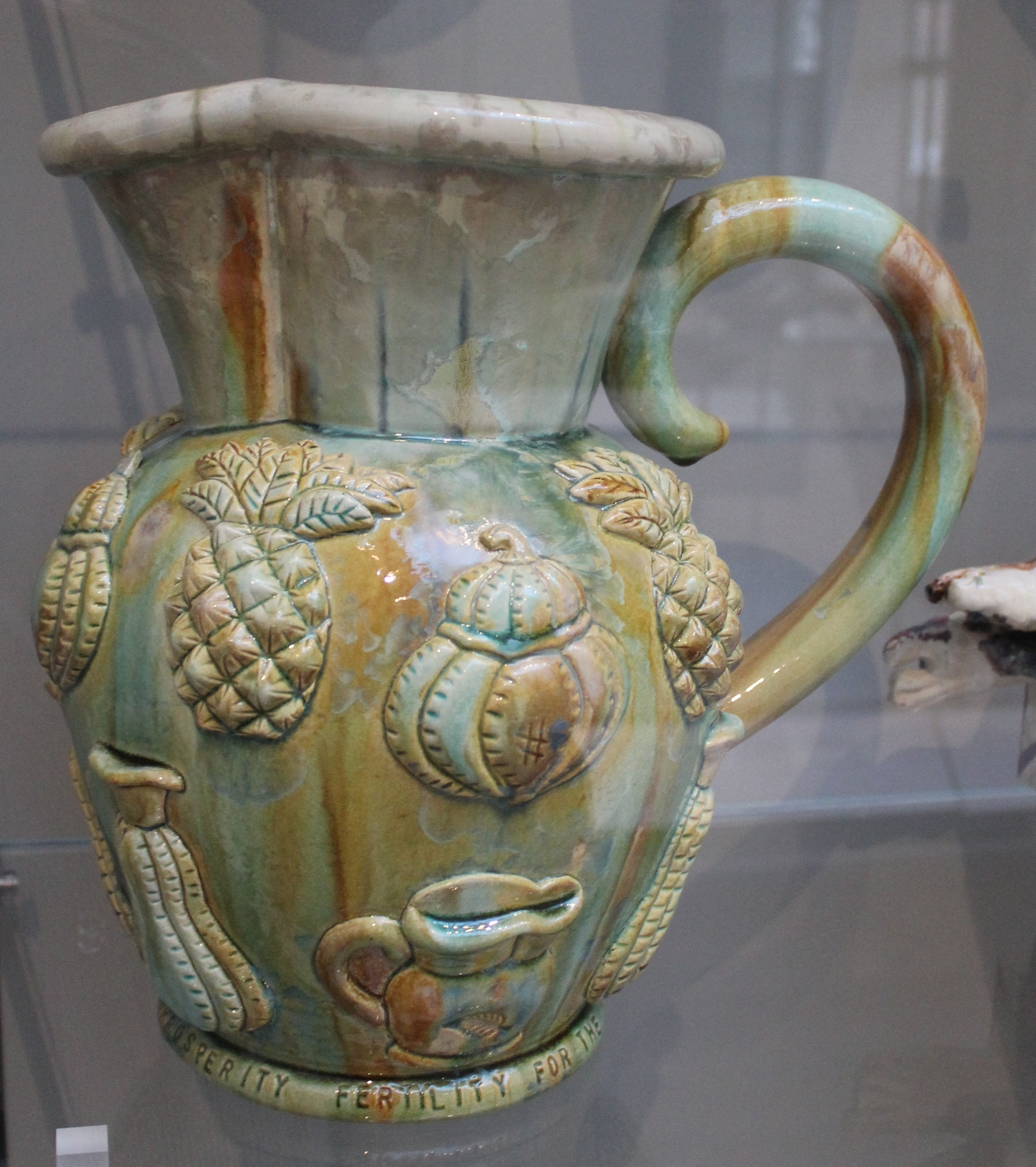
Millennium Jug of Symbols in the Victoria and Albert Museum, London

Malone studied at Bristol Polytechnic (1979–82) and, after leaving the Royal College of Art in 1986, began working in a studio in the South Bank Craft Centre at Charing Cross. Malone's work is held in the British Council collection.

Her work is on display in a number of public locations, a giant ceramic fish in the water at Hackney Marshes and a large pot at Manchester Art Gallery. Malone's work is also held in numerous public collections, including the Arts Council, Bristol City Museum and Art Gallery, Crafts Council, The Ashmolean Museum, Musée national de céramique de Sèvres, Victoria & Albert Museum and Los Angeles County Museum of Art. She made a large number of new works for an exhibition Inspired by Waddesdon Manor in 2016, including portrait vases of Ferdinand de Rothschild and his sister Alice Charlotte von Rothschild.

Malone worked with EPR Architects on a project at 24 Savile Row which gained a first place WAN Facade Award in 2015 and is a finalist in the 2016 Surface Design Awards. The project involved making 10,000 hand-glazed ceramic tiles.

Malone has said, "pottery is almost as good as sex – it's so physical and so… fantastic".

She was appointed Member of the Order of the British Empire (MBE) in the 2019 Birthday Honours for services to ceramic art.

== Bibliography ==
- With Lesley Jackson Fruits of the Earth and Sea: Ceramics by Kate Malone Manchester Art Gallery (1 April 1994) ISBN 978-0901673466
- The Allotment: New Ceramics by Kate Malone mac (Oct. 1998) ISBN 978-0953447701
- With Lesley Jackson A Book of Pots A & C Black Publishers Ltd (30 Jun. 2003) ISBN 978-0713661804
- Kate Malone Inspired by Waddesdon published by Adrian Sassoon (2016) ISBN 9780995457003
