= Florence Brudenell-Bruce =

British actress (born 1985)

Florence St George
- Born: Florence Anne-Marie Brudenell-Bruce; 21 November 1985 (age 40); Merton, London, England
- Occupations: Model; actress
- Years active: 2006–present
- Spouse: Henry St George (m. 2013)
- Modeling information
- Hair color: Blonde
- Eye color: Hazel
- Agency: Tess Management
- Website: Brudenell-Bruce at Tess Management.com

Florence "Flea" Anne-Marie St George (née Brudenell-Bruce; born 21 November 1985) is an English model, ceramic artist and former actress.

== Early life and education ==
Brudenell-Bruce was born in Fulham, England to wine merchant Andrew Brudenell-Bruce and French artist Sophie Brudenell-Bruce. She was educated at Woldingham School and Stowe School, before studying history of art at the University of Bristol.

== Career ==
Brudenell-Bruce worked as a fashion model and later pursued acting. She appeared as Sydney in the 2013 science-fiction television film Robocroc and portrayed Amy Catz in the Lewis episode "The Mind Has Mountains" in 2011. She later began working with ceramics following experiences with post-natal depression. In 2020, she appeared as a contestant on The Great Pottery Throw Down.

== Personal life ==
On 6 July 2013, she married Henry Edward Hugh St George. Their daughter was born in 2014.

== Filmography ==
Year	Film	Role	Notes
2009	Love Aaj Kal	Jo	
2011	Lewis	Amy Katz	TV series, season 5 Episode 3: "The Mind Has Mountains"
2012	The Sweeney	Young Bank Lady	
2013	Robocroc	Sydney	TV movie
2020	The Great Pottery Throw Down	Self	Series 3
