= Capel Salem, Pwllheli =

Former chapel in Gwynedd, Wales

Coordinates: 52.8897°N 4.4179°W

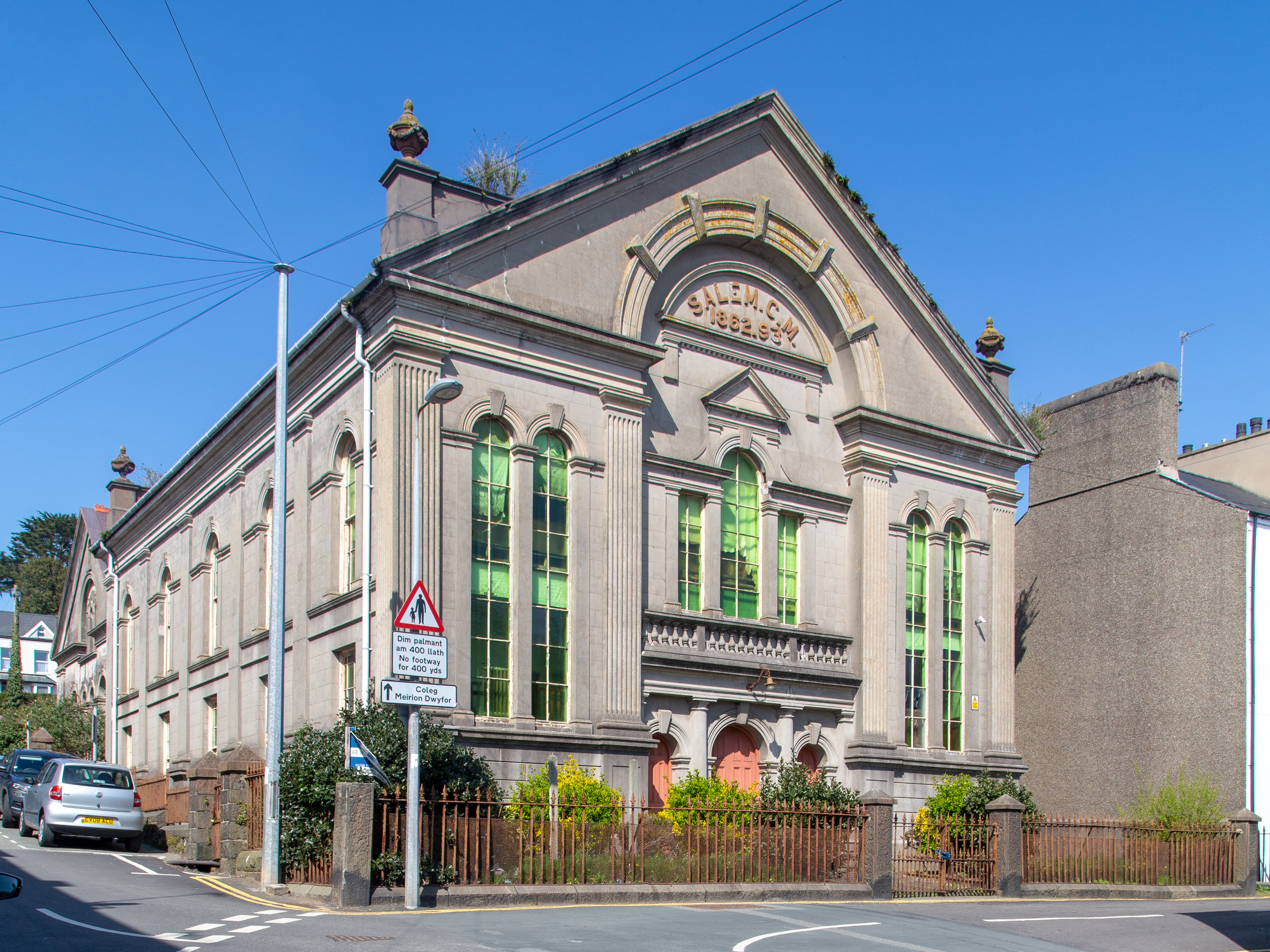
Capel Salem in 2019

Capel Salem is a Grade II listed former chapel in Pwllheli, Gwynedd, Wales. It was originally built in 1862 for the Presbyterian Church of Wales, to the designs of the architect Thomas Thomas of Landore. In 1893 it was remodelled and enlarged. A fire was started in 1913 by a local who tried to steal money from the chapel; when he found none, he set fire to the building. It was then closed until 1915 after restoration.

In September 2022, the chapel and its adjoining Sunday school annex, which had been on the market for twelve years, were purchased by the potter Keith Brymer Jones and his wife, Marj Hogarth. Brymer Jones said that they planned to convert the property into a studio and living quarters and eventually open it to the community.

A four-part show depicting the initial phase of the renovation, Our Welsh Chapel Dream, was broadcast on Channel 4. The episodes describe challenges faced by Brymer Jones and Hogarth, including dry rot, fungus growth, decades of pigeon excrement, and the absence of water and electricity, as well as the reactions of people of Pwllheli to the repurposing of the building complex.

A second four-episode series, which shows Brymer Jones, Hogarth and local builders converting the downstairs area of the Sunday school into a kitchen, bathroom, bedroom and snug, was broadcast in April 2025.

A third four-episode series was released in April 2026. By the time of this third series, Brymer Jones and Hogarth were living in Capel Salem, and the four episodes show the conversion of the Sunday school hall into a pottery studio for Brymer Jones; the transformation of storerooms into a guest suite with an entrance to a brutalist-inspired courtyard; the renovation of the main entrance in order to give it a Scottish baronial flair; and a celebration of Brymer Jones' 60th birthday. This third series describes a collaboration between Brymer Jones and Duchess China 1888, a factory in Stoke-on-Trent, to produce bone china mugs showing Capel Salem.

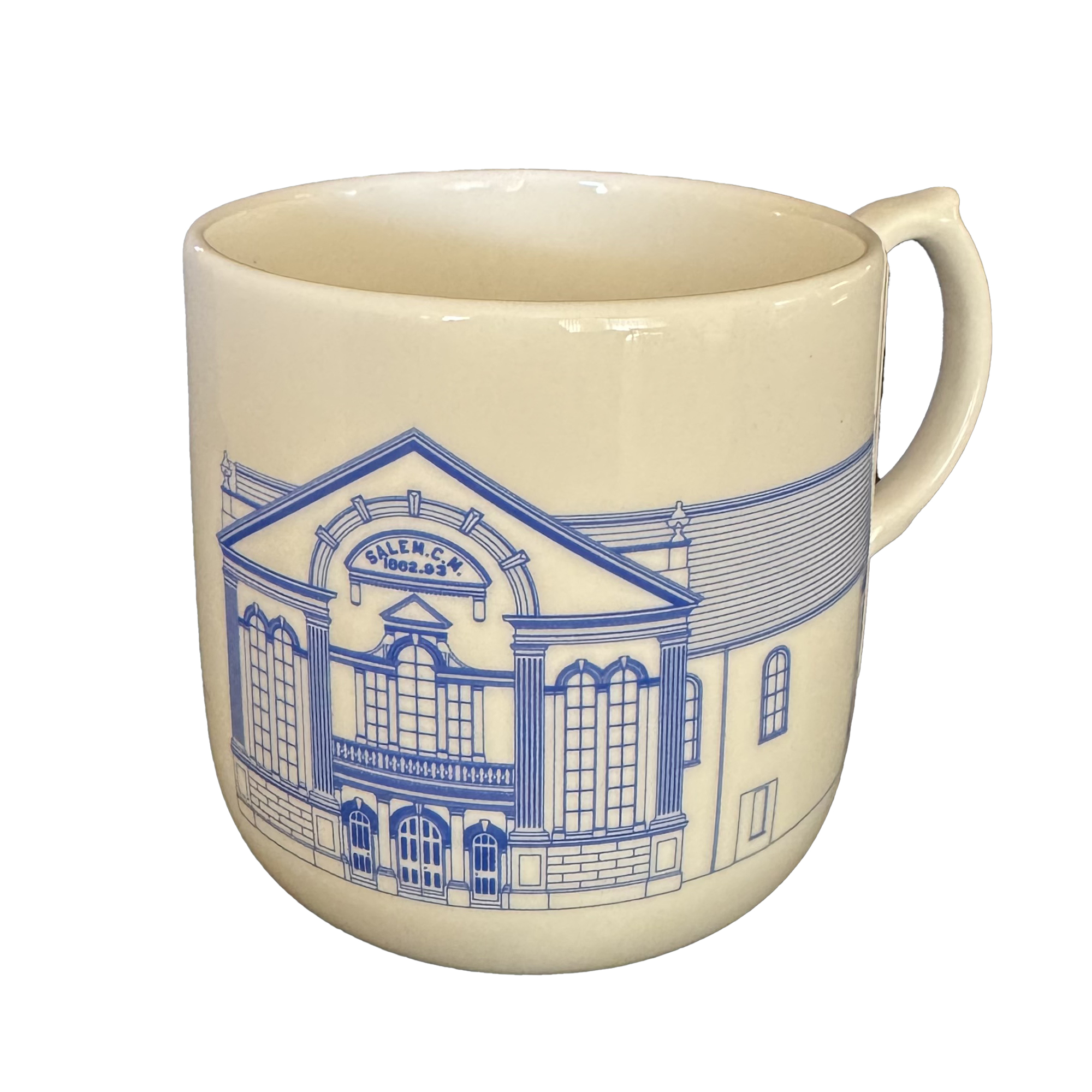
Capel Salem tea mug designed by Keith Brymer Jones and manufactured by Duchess China

Filming is currently underway for a fourth season of Our Welsh Chapel Dream, although no airdate has been announced.
