= Rose Schmits =

Dutch ceramicist

Rose Schmits is a ceramic artist best known as the kiln and firing technician on the Channel 4 competition series The Great Pottery Throw Down. Schmits is from Delft and moved to the United Kingdom to study at the City & Guilds of London Art School. She won the Undergraduate Prize awarded by the Artists' Collecting Society in 2018. Schmits appeared on the Great Pottery Throw Down from the fourth season (2021) through the seventh (2024).

Schmits bases her work on the Delftware pottery technique. Her work includes:

- We Live in a Society Collection
- Crawler Pot Collection
- Trans Forms Collection
- Creature from the Delft Canal
- Galatea’s C***
