= Teacher, Teacher (Rockpile song) =

Single by Rockpile

from the album Seconds of Pleasure
- B-side: "Fool Too Long"
- Released: 5 December 1980
- Genre: New wave
- Length: 2:36
- Label: F-Beat
- Songwriter(s): Eddie Phillips; Kenny Pickett
- Producer(s): Nick Lowe and Rockpile

Rockpile singles chronology
"Wrong Again (Let's Face It)" (1980)	"Teacher, Teacher" (1980)	"Heart" (1981)

"Teacher, Teacher" is a 1980 new wave song by Rockpile. Written by Eddie Phillips and Kenny Pickett, the song was released on the band's only album, Seconds of Pleasure. Released as a single that same year, the song was a moderate chart hit in North America, reaching number 51 in the US.

The song has since seen positive reception from critics and has been highlighted as one of the best tracks on the album.

== Background ==
"Teacher, Teacher" was written by Eddie Phillips and Kenny Pickett, members of the psychedelic rock band the Creation. In contrast to the Creation's experimental style, "Teacher, Teacher" follows the new wave style of Rockpile. The song is sung by bassist Nick Lowe, with harmonies from guitarists Dave Edmunds and Billy Bremner during the chorus ("Teacher, teacher, teach me love/I can't learn it fast enough/Teacher, teacher, teach me more/I got to learn to love for sure").

Engineer Aldo Bocca recalled the sessions for the song as being typical for the album, explaining that each one began with Lowe, Bremner and Edmunds exchanging ideas regarding the song's arrangement; "Nick might have an idea, so Billy would pick his guitar up and Dave would join in, and they'd all huddle around the drum kit and see what would we do with the drum part. They'd flesh out the parts of the song and try it. We'd put it on tape so everyone could come into the control room and listen. Then it would be, 'That's not bad. Let's just change this bit or that bit.' And they might go back out to try again, or maybe take a pub break, then come back and see if it's working." The final arrangement is mostly rhythm-driven, with layers of both acoustic and electric guitars accompanying Lowe's bass, and occasional register changes and electric guitar trills aiding to progress the song. Lowe's bass and Edmunds' guitar were both sent direct through the studio's then-new SSL 4000E console, likely due to the band's strong faith in it. Drummer Terry Williams recorded his drumming in the main studio, with either Edmunds or Bremner recording guide vocals and acoustic guitar parts in isolation in a vocal booth. During mixing, Bocca overdubbed final guitar parts and vocals. Though he could not recall what reverb effect he used on the vocals, the studio had an EMT 150 plate at the time, which he frequently combined with delays that he created on an Eventide Harmonizer, giving the vocals a rich, vintage quality that is also heard on every other song on the album.

== Release and reception ==
In addition to its release on Seconds of Pleasure, "Teacher, Teacher" was released as the album's second single. The B-side was another track from Seconds of Pleasure, "Fool Too Long". The song was a moderate success for the band, reaching number 51 in the US and number 31 in Canada. The song's success was helped by the release of a music video for the song, which saw popularity on MTV.

"Teacher, Teacher" has generally seen positive reception from critics, who rank it as a highlight from the album. Stephen Thomas Erlewine of AllMusic described the song as "infectious", while the same site's Stewart Mason called it "an insanely catchy song, with a brilliant guitar break featuring Billy Bremner on jangly Rickenbacker behind Edmunds' twangy solo". The Arizona Republic named it one of the top songs about school and compared it positively against Van Halen's "Hot for Teacher". The Birmingham News named the song one of the key tracks from the album.

== Charts ==
Chart (1980)	Peak position
Canadian Singles Chart	31
US Billboard Hot 100	51
Chart (1981)	Peak position
Australia (Kent Music Report)	83
