= Keith Brymer Jones =

British potter and ceramic designer (born 1965)

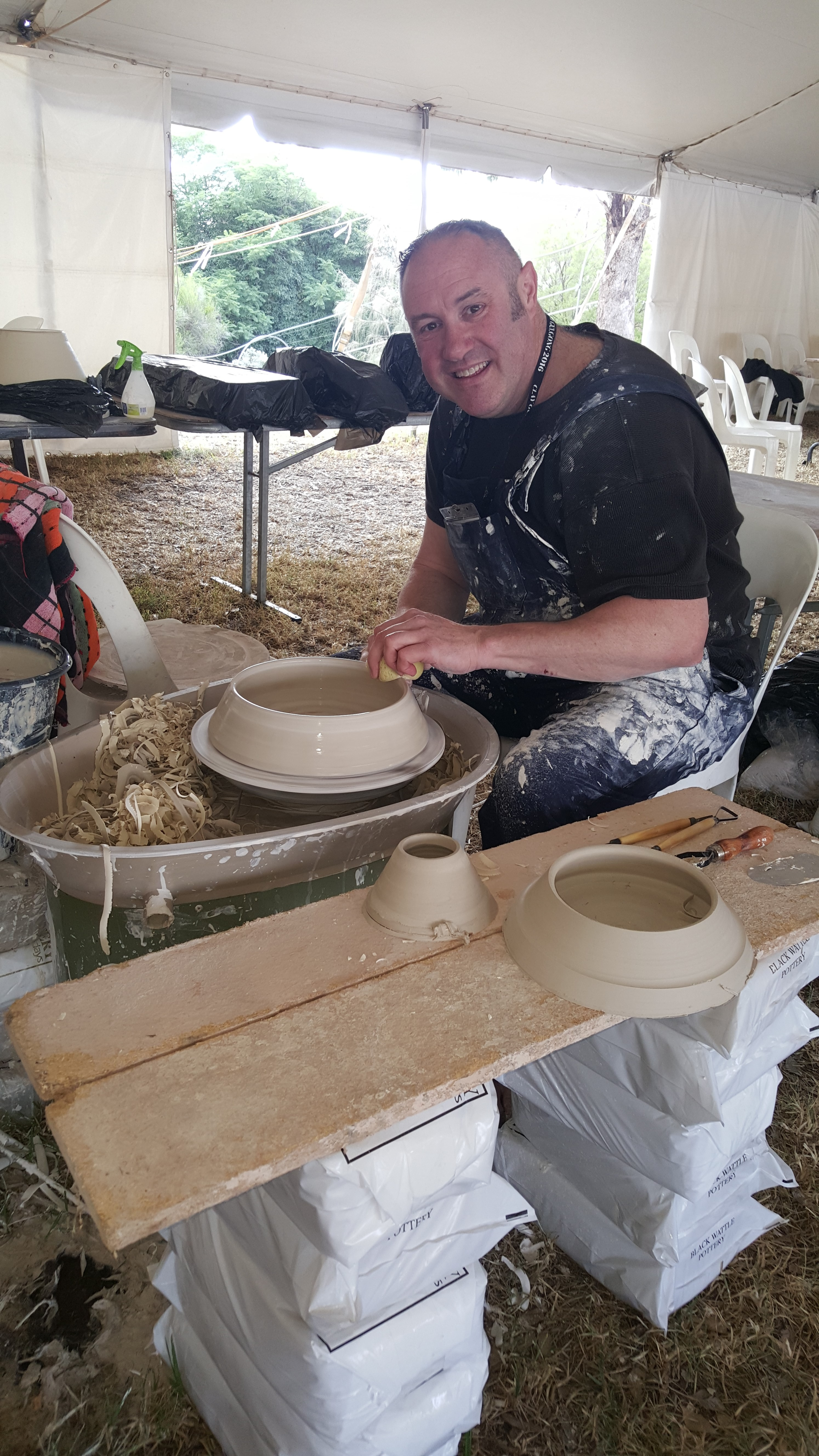
- Brymer Jones on a wheel at Clay Gulgong 2016, Gulgong, New South Wales
- Born: Finchley, London, England
- Occupations: Potter, ceramic designer
- Notable work: The Great Pottery Throw Down
- Partner: Marj Hogarth
- Website: www.keithbrymerjones.com

Keith Brymer Jones is a British potter and ceramic designer who produces homeware with retro lettering and punk motifs. He is an expert judge on Channel 4 television programme The Great Pottery Throw Down.

== Early life ==
Brymer Jones was born in Finchley, London. He describes his father as a "very, very sporty" tennis player. His mother was an alcoholic who died at the age of 55 in 1992.

Brymer Jones has dyslexia, something he was not diagnosed with as a child, and he recalls teachers often ridiculing him. At the age of 11, Brymer Jones made his first pottery object – an owl – in his art class in secondary school. It was then that he knew he wanted to be a potter. He has said appreciation for his work by his art teacher, Mr Mortman, was one of the first times a teacher complimented his work. Brymer Jones also studied many forms of dance, including ballet, Highland, tap, and Scottish country dance from 3 until 18.

== Career ==
In 1983, Brymer Jones was working at a Tesco, when he was approached by a co-worker who said he was in a punk band called The Wigs and needed a lead singer. Brymer Jones then began his brief stint as lead singer for the group.

Brymer Jones soon left the band and worked for two men in a Watford pottery studio. He would wake up at 5am and walk two and a half hours to his job, where he spent ten hours preparing clay. Brymer Jones then became an apprentice at Harefield Pottery in London. This is where he learned to make modern ceramics. He stopped working for them when they relocated to Scotland.

After his apprenticeship, Brymer Jones started out hand-making ceramics for retailers including Conran Group, Habitat, Barneys New York, Monsoon, Laura Ashley and Heal's. He began to develop the Word Range for the first time; he was originally attracted to words because of their shapes, as he is dyslexic. Brymer Jones describes working with clay, shape and form as a natural affinity, as a result of his condition.

Brymer Jones is head of design for MAKE International.

In 2015, he debuted as an expert judge alongside Kate Malone on BBC2's The Great Pottery Throw Down where his readiness to shed tears at the contestants' work attracted comment. He remained as judge when the programme transferred to More4 in 2020 and Channel 4 in 2021.

Brymer Jones published his autobiography in 2022: Boy in a China Shop: Life, Clay and Everything.

In October 2026, Brymer Jones released his book Firing Earth: An Unexpected History of Pots and Potters (Hodder & Stoughton). In interviews surrounding the book's launch, he reflected on his early career as an apprentice at Harefield Pottery, his commercial ceramic design work for retailers such as Habitat, and how a viral parody video led to his role as a judge on The Great Pottery Throw Down.

== Personal life ==
In 2019, Brymer Jones was made an honorary graduate of the University of Staffordshire.

Brymer Jones had a studio in Whitstable, Kent, where he lived with his partner, actor Marj Hogarth. (Real name Margery Brown, born October 1967)

In 2022, Brymer Jones and Hogarth bought Capel Salem, Pwllheli. Their restoration of the chapel as a home and studio has been filmed as Our Welsh Chapel Dream on Channel 4. The first series was in 2024 and the second in 2025. A third series was broadcast in spring 2026.
