= The Great Pottery Throw Down =

British television competition programme

- Genre: Reality
- Presented by: Sara Cox; Melanie Sykes; Ellie Taylor; Siobhán McSweeney; Liza Tarbuck
- Judges: Keith Brymer Jones; Kate Malone; Sue Pryke; Richard Miller
- Opening theme: "I Can't Explain" by The Who (2015) "Making Time" by The Creation (2017–2025) "Spinning World" by The Huntsmen (2026–present)
- Country of origin: United Kingdom
- Original language: English
- No. of series: 9
- No. of episodes: 64

Production
- Production locations: Middleport Pottery, Stoke-on-Trent; Gladstone Pottery Museum, Stoke-on-Trent
- Running time: 60-90 minutes
- Production company: Love Productions

Original release
- Network: BBC Two
- Release: 3 November 2015 – 23 March 2017
- Network: More 4
- Release: 8 January – 11 March 2020
- Network: Channel 4
- Release: 10 January 2021 – present

Related
- The Great British Sewing Bee

The Great Pottery Throw Down is a British television competition programme that first aired on BBC Two from 3 November 2015 to 23 March 2017. It was then moved to More4 from 8 January to 11 March 2020, and has been broadcast by Channel 4 since 10 January 2021.

== Format ==
In each episode, a group of amateur potters compete to complete two pottery challenges. In the "main make" challenge, contestants undertake a substantial multi-stage creative task: subject to given specifications, they must design a ceramic creation, build it from clay body, and decorate it, and present it to the judges for evaluation after it is fired in the kiln. In between stages of the main make, potters are given a "second challenge", a smaller-scale task testing a specific pottery skill, on which they are ranked from worst to best by the judges. At the end of each episode, the judges designate the best-performing contestant as "potter of the week". The contestant with the worst results is dismissed, and all others return for the following episode; the winner of the final episode is the overall winner of the series.

== Series overview ==
Series	Episodes	Premiere	Finale	Winner
1	6	3 November 2015	8 December 2015	Matthew Wilcock
2	8	2 February 2017	23 March 2017	Ryan Barrett
3	10	8 January 2020	11 March 2020	Rosa Wiland Holmes
4	10	10 January 2021	14 March 2021	Jodie Neale
5	10	2 January 2022	6 March 2022	AJ Simpson
6	10	8 January 2023	12 March 2023	Loïs Gunn
7	10	7 January 2024	10 March 2024	Donna Bloye
8	10	5 January 2025	9 March 2025	James Stanley Watson
9	10	4 January 2026	8 March 2026	Fynn Allen

=== Series 1 (2015) ===
The first series of The Great Pottery Throw Down began on 3 November 2015 on BBC Two, and concluded on 8 December 2015. The judges for the series were Keith Brymer Jones and Kate Malone, with Sara Cox serving as host. The competition was held at Middleport Pottery.

==== Potters ====
Potter	Age	Occupation	Hometown
James Greenwood	31	Vet	Bristol
Jane Williams	40	College tutor	North Wales
Jim Ranson	52	Part-time painter and decorator	Bognor Regis
Joanna Morris	42	Parish Councillor	West Sussex
Matthew Wilcock	23	Teacher	Giggleswick
Nigel Matthews	52	Builder	Bakewell
Rekha Sameer	49	Conceptual artist	Buckinghamshire
Sally-Jo Bond	33	Interior designer	Petersfield
Sandra Whyles	52	Project Manager	Leeds
Tom Knowles Jackson	41	Retired Army Major	Gloucestershire

==== Results summary ====
Elimination chart
Potter	1	2	3	4	5	6
Matthew			WIN			Winner
Jim		WIN				Runner-Up
Sally-Jo						Runner-Up
Tom	WIN					Runner-Up
Jane					ELIM	
Sandra				ELIM		
James			ELIM			
Joanna			EXIT			
Nigel		ELIM				
Rekha	ELIM					

Colour key:

Potter was eliminated
Potter won Pot of the Week
Potter walked from the series
Potter got through to the next round
Potter was one of the least favourite
Potter was one of the favourites
Potter was a series finalist
Potter was the series winner

==== Ratings ====
Episode no.	Airdate	Total viewers (millions)	BBC Two weekly ranking
1	3 November 2015	2.29	8
2	10 November 2015	2.47	10
3	17 November 2015	2.49	7
4	24 November 2015	2.16	11
5	1 December 2015	2.37	7
6	8 December 2015	2.55	7

=== Series 2 (2017) ===
The second series of The Great Pottery Throw Down began on 2 February 2017 on BBC Two, and concluded on 23 March 2017.

==== Potters ====
Potter	Age	Occupation	Hometown
Cáit Gould	31	Quaker Meeting House worker	Reading
Carole Sender	63	Pottery Teacher	Hertfordshire
Clover Lee	33	Accountant and Part-time Illustrator	London
Daniel Pratap	55	Mortgage adviser	Hampshire
Elaine Wells	55	Banana import business owner	Buckinghamshire
Freya Bramble-Carter	24	Student	London
James Douglass	25	Tour guide in National Glass Centre	Newcastle upon Tyne
Nam Tran	27	Cage fighter and Kick boxer	London
Richard J Parker	53	Pub landlord	Banbury
Ryan Barrett	30	Model	Ipswich

==== Results summary ====
Elimination chart
Potter	1	2	3	4	5^{[a]}	6	7	8
Ryan	WIN						WIN	Winner
Clover						WIN		Runner-Up
Richard					WIN			Runner-Up
Freya				WIN			ELIM	
Cáit						ELIM		
Nam			WIN			ELIM		
Elaine		WIN		ELIM				
James			ELIM					
Daniel		ELIM						
Carole	ELIM							

^{[a]} Because the judges were unable to agree, no-one was eliminated this week. As a result, two potters were eliminated the following week.

Colour key:

Potter was eliminated
Potter won Pot of the Week
Potter walked from the series
Potter got through to the next round
Potter was one of the least favourite
Potter was one of the favourites
Potter was a series finalist
Potter was the series winner

==== Ratings ====
Episode no.	Airdate	Total viewers (millions)	BBC Two weekly ranking
1	2 February 2017	2.38	5
2	9 February 2017	2.60	5
3	16 February 2017	2.60	4
4	23 February 2017	2.78	3
5	2 March 2017	2.77	4
6	9 March 2017	2.85	4
7	16 March 2017	3.34	1
8	23 March 2017	3.44	1

=== Series 3 (2020) ===
The third series of The Great Pottery Throw Down began on 8 January 2020 on More4, and concluded on 11 March 2020. Ceramic designer Sue Pryke took over as judge from Kate Malone, and Melanie Sykes became the new host.

==== Potters ====
Potter	Age	Occupation	Hometown
Claire Murdock	29	Warehouse operative	County Antrim, Northern Ireland
Flea Brudenell-Bruce	33	Full-time mother	London
Jacob Chan	23	Studio potter	Liverpool
Kit Andrews	19	Home potter	Cornwall
Leonard Young	70	Retired company director	Cornwall
Matt Cronshaw	30	Professional cycling manager	Greater Manchester
Rainna Erbas	27	Full-time carer	Kent
Ronaldo Wiltshire	31	Art college technician and part time tutor	London
Rosa Wiland Holmes	43	Full-time mother and former fashion designer	Buckinghamshire
Rosalind Worland	59	Retired antique shop owner	Essex
Sampada Gurung	26	Craft assistant and illustrator	London
Tom James	39	Composer and music teacher	Sheffield

==== Results summary ====
Elimination chart
Potter	1	2	3	4	5	6	7	8	9	10
Rosa						WIN				Winner
Jacob		WIN			WIN				WIN	Runner-Up
Matt							WIN			Runner-Up
Claire	WIN			WIN				WIN	ELIM	
Rosalind						WIN		ELIM		
Ronaldo							ELIM			
Rainna			WIN			ELIM				
Flea					ELIM					
Leonard				ELIM						
Kit			ELIM							
Sampada		ELIM								
Tom	ELIM									

Colour key:

Potter was eliminated
Potter won Pot of the Week
Potter walked from the series
Potter got through to the next round
Potter was one of the least favourite
Potter was one of the favourites
Potter was a series finalist
Potter was the series winner

=== Series 4 (2021) ===
The fourth series of The Great Pottery Throw Down began on 10 January 2021 on Channel 4, and concluded on 14 March 2021. The competition moved to the Gladstone Pottery Museum starting with this season. Richard Miller moved from kiln technician into a judging role alongside Keith Brymer Jones, and Siobhán McSweeney became the new host.

==== Potters ====
Potter	Age	Occupation	Hometown
Adam Johnson	36	Support worker	Brighton
Alon Shahar	20	Architecture student	London
Ara Moradian	57	Retired theatre wardrobe manager	Folkestone
Hannah Ruth Walker	30	Housing project manager	Bristol
Henry Moore	25	Retirement home activities organiser	Suffolk
Irina	43	Executive ground staff	Essex
Jodie Neale	35	NHS scrub nurse	Rhondda Valley
Lee Pollard	44	Community nurse	Huddersfield
Peter White	70	Design and technology teacher	Milton Keynes
Sally ‘Sal’ Tully	58	Art and design teacher	Cornwall
Shenyue Ding	28	Model	London
Susan ‘Suz’ MacInnes	55	Library assistant	Aberdeenshire

==== Results summary ====
Elimination chart
Potter	1	2	3	4^{[a]}	5	6	7	8	9	10
Jodie		WIN					WIN			Winner
Adam									WIN	Runner-Up
Peter								WIN		Runner-Up
Hannah				WIN					ELIM	
Alon					WIN			ELIM		
Sal	WIN					WIN		ELIM		
Henry							ELIM			
Shenyue			WIN			ELIM				
Lee					ELIM					
Suz			ELIM							
Irina		ELIM								
Ara	ELIM									

^{[a]} Due to the COVID-19 pandemic, filming ceased for 7 days to ensure the safety of the potters and crew. As a result, the judges decided not to eliminate anyone.

Colour key:

Potter was eliminated
Potter won Pot of the Week
Potter walked from the series
Potter got through to the next round
Potter was one of the least favourite
Potter was one of the favourites
Potter was a series finalist
Potter was the series winner

=== Series 5 (2022) ===
The fifth series of The Great Pottery Throw Down began on 2 January 2022 on Channel 4, and concluded on 6 March 2022. The series was co-hosted by Ellie Taylor, while Siobhán McSweeney was recovering from a broken leg. It was judged by Keith Brymer Jones and Richard Miller. Also appearing was Rose Schmits, who acted as behind-the-scenes technician.

==== Potters ====
Potter	Age	Occupation	Hometown
AJ Simpson	21	Design graduate	Aberdeen
Anna McGurn	57	Social care facilitator	Fermanagh, Northern Ireland
Bill Thomas	63	Museum learning assistant	Scarborough
Cellan Cox	23	3D design and craft graduate	Brighton
Christine Cherry	57	Art youth worker	Preston
Jenny Cobb	43	Full time mum	North Lincolnshire
Josh Duarte	27	Design and technology teacher	Berkshire
Lucinda Lovesey	58	Retired NHS therapist	Shropshire
Miles Johnson	50	Denim designer	Worcestershire
Nick Robatto	43	Prop Maker	Barry
Tom Demeranville	44	Product director	Bath
Zahra Jabir	32	Hospital doctor	Manchester

==== Results Summary ====
Elimination chart
Potter	1	2	3	4	5	6	7	8	9	10
AJ					WIN		WIN		WIN	Winner
Anna										Runner-Up
Christine								WIN		Runner-Up
Lucinda	WIN								ELIM	
Jenny						WIN		ELIM		
Tom				WIN			ELIM			
Nick			WIN			ELIM				
Cellan		WIN			ELIM					
Miles				ELIM						
Josh			ELIM							
Zahra		ELIM								
Bill	ELIM									

Colour Key

Potter won Pot of the Week.
Potter was one of the judges' favourites of the week.
Potter was safe and was through to the next week.
Potter was one of the judges' least favourites of the week.
Potter was eliminated.
Potter was a finalist.
Potter won the series.

==== Ratings ====
Episode no.	Airdate	Total viewers (millions)	Weekly ranking all channels
1	2 January 2022	—N/a	—N/a
2	9 January 2022	—N/a	—N/a
3	16 January 2022	—N/a	—N/a
4	23 January 2022	—N/a	—N/a
5	30 January 2022	—N/a	—N/a
6	6 February 2022	—N/a	—N/a
7	13 February 2022	—N/a	—N/a
8	20 February 2022	—N/a	—N/a
9	27 February 2022	—N/a	—N/a
10	6 March 2022	3.07	47

=== Series 6 (2023) ===
The sixth series of The Great Pottery Throw Down began on 8 January 2023 on Channel 4, and concluded on 12 March 2023.

==== Potters ====
Potter	Age	Occupation	Hometown
Caitlin Foulds	23	Medical Student	Glasgow
Christophe Donot	36	Architect	London
Derek Harbinson	57	Journalist, Editor	Tunbridge Wells
Fabiola Ladino	52	Nanny	London
Fliss Rowbotham	24	Oil Painter	London
George Lodge	27	Junior Doctor	Hampshire
Helen Baxter	65	Retired Headteacher	Kent
James Stead	44	Art Teacher	Banbury
Jon Roynon	46	Chartered Structural Engineer	Corsham
Loïs Gunn	36	Jewellery Designer	Ramsgate
Rebecca Norris	32	Teacher	Scarborough
Vithu Karunakaran	29	Bartender, Waiter	Manchester

==== Results Summary ====
Elimination chart
Potter	1	2	3	4	5	6	7	8	9	10
Loïs	WIN				WIN			WIN		Winner
James			WIN							Runner-Up
Jon						WIN				Runner-Up
Caitlin		WIN							ELIM	
Helen								ELIM		
Derek							ELIM			
George						ELIM				
Rebecca					ELIM					
Fabiola				ELIM						
Christophe			ELIM							
Fliss		ELIM								
Vithu	ELIM									

Colour Key

Potter won Pot of the Week.
Potter was one of the judges' favourites of the week.
Potter was safe and was through to the next week.
Potter was one of the judges' least favourites of the week.
Potter was eliminated.
Potter was a finalist.
Potter won the series.

==== Ratings ====
Episode no.	Airdate	Total viewers (millions)	Weekly ranking all channels
1	8 January 2023	—N/a	—N/a
2	15 January 2023	—N/a	—N/a
3	22 January 2023	—N/a	—N/a
4	29 January 2023	—N/a	—N/a
5	5 February 2023	—N/a	—N/a
6	12 February 2023	—N/a	—N/a
7	19 February 2023	2.85	45
8	26 February 2023	—N/a	—N/a
9	5 March 2023	—N/a	—N/a
10	12 March 2023	3.05	45

=== Series 7 (2024) ===
The seventh series of The Great Pottery Throw Down began on 7 January 2024 on Channel 4, and concluded on 10 March 2024.

==== Potters ====
Potter	Age	Occupation	Hometown
Andrew Macbean	67	Actor	London
Cadi Froehlich	50	Admin Assistant	Brighton
Dan Sandham	41	Systems Engineer	Weymouth
Daniel Stapleton	30	Data Scientist	London
Dave Short	58	Retired Teacher	Evesham
Donna Bloye	44	Former Art Teacher	Bangor
Edward King	33	Housing Officer	Plymouth
Jan Morgan	61	Science Lecturer	Llanelli
Princess Fingall	24	Studio Technician	London
Shani Yeomans	38	Small Business	Bristol
Sophie Wootton	24	Graduate Student	Warwickshire
Steven Broughton	33	Art Teacher	Oxfordshire

==== Results summary ====
Elimination chart
Potter	1	2	3	4	5	6	7	8	9	10
Donna	WIN		WIN			WIN	WIN	WIN		Winner
Dan									WIN	Runner-Up
Dave				WIN						Runner-Up
Steven					WIN				ELIM	
Jan								ELIM		
Sophie							ELIM			
Cadi		WIN				ELIM				
Princess					ELIM					
Daniel				ELIM						
Shani			ELIM							
Edward		ELIM								
Andrew	ELIM									

Colour Key

Potter won Pot of the Week.
Potter was one of the judges' favourites of the week.
Potter was safe and was through to the next week.
Potter was one of the judges' least favourites of the week.
Potter was eliminated.
Potter was a finalist.
Potter won the series.

==== Ratings ====
Episode no.	Airdate	Total viewers (millions)	Weekly ranking all channels
1	7 January 2024	—N/a	—N/a
2	14 January 2024	—N/a	—N/a
3	21 January 2024	—N/a	—N/a
4	28 January 2024	—N/a	—N/a
5	4 February 2024	—N/a	—N/a
6	11 February 2024	—N/a	—N/a
7	18 February 2024	—N/a	—N/a
8	25 February 2024	—N/a	—N/a
9	3 March 2024	—N/a	—N/a
10	10 March 2024	2.90	43

=== Series 8 (2025) ===
The eighth series of The Great Pottery Throw Down began on 5 January 2025 on Channel 4. The new kiln technician for this series was former series 7 contestant Princess Fingall.

==== Potters ====
Potter	Age	Occupation	Hometown
Chris Parkes	36	Military Veteran	
Diana Parker	62	Retired Art, Design & Textiles Teacher	Dorset, originally Derbyshire
Francesca Dourado	28	Make Up Artist	Bristol, originally Kenya
Hayley Rowlands	55	Social Worker / Fostering Panel Chair	Suffolk
Imy Harris	22	Model & Deaf Advocate	
James Stanley Watson	42	Project Manager	Belfast
Jonathan Jolly-Vanderheyden	61	Holiday Let Owner	Scotland, originally Leeds
Natalie Sims Rees	41	Swimming & Aqua Aerobics Instructor	Derby
Olivia Rowan	26	Art & Design Teacher & Cycle Tour Guide	Liverpool
Stephen Parkes	58	Audio Visual / IT Technician	Birmingham, originally Nottingham
Steve Brown	48	Animator	London, originally North Wales
Victor Ng	31	Digital Product Designer	London, originally Canada

==== Results summary ====
Elimination chart
Potter	1	2	3	4	5	6	7	8	9	10
James	WIN					WIN			WIN	Winner
Natalie			WIN		WIN			WIN		Runner-Up
Steve		WIN		WIN			WIN			Runner-Up
Diana									ELIM	
Francesca								ELIM		
Jonathan							ELIM			
Imy						ELIM				
Stephen					ELIM					
Hayley				ELIM						
Victor			ELIM							
Chris		ELIM								
Olivia		ELIM								

Colour Key

Potter won Pot of the Week.
Potter was one of the judges' favourites of the week.
Potter was safe and was through to the next week.
Potter was one of the judges' least favourites of the week.
Potter was eliminated.
Potter was a finalist.
Potter won the series.

=== Series 9 (2026) ===
The ninth series of The Great Pottery Throw Down began on 4 January 2026 on Channel 4.

==== Potters ====
Potter	Age	Occupation	Hometown
Andrew	48	English Teacher	Hampshire
Angharad	34	Communication Support Worker	Bridgend
Bill	33	Volunteer Teaching Assistant	Herefordshire
Elham	31	Midwife	Sheffield
Emily	39	Habitat Restoration Ecologist	Inverness
Fynn	37	Tattooist	Cornwall
Kayleigh	38	Art Teacher	Oxfordshire
Kaz	62	Former Psychiatric Nurse	Swansea
Mark	63	University Facilities & Estate Manager	Merseyside
Naveed	42	Actor & Toy Shop Owner	Folkestone
Olympia	28	Between Jobs	West Midlands
Whitney	36	Chemistry Teacher	Glasgow

===== Results summary =====
Elimination chart
Potter	1	2	3	4	5	6	7	8	9	10
Fynn	WIN				WIN					Winner
Angharad			WIN					WIN		Runner-Up
Elham						WIN			WIN	Runner-Up
Bill									ELIM	
Naveed								ELIM		
Kayleigh		WIN					WIN	ELIM		
Emily				WIN			ELIM			
Andrew					ELIM					
Whitney				ELIM						
Mark			ELIM							
Kaz		ELIM								
Olympia	ELIM									

Colour Key

Potter won Potter of the Week.
Potter was one of the judges' favourites of the week.
Potter was safe and was through to the next week.
Potter was one of the judges' least favourites of the week.
Potter was eliminated.
Potter was a finalist.
Potter won the series.

=== The Festive Pottery Throwdown ===
The Festive Pottery Throwdown is a series of one-off Christmas specials where celebrities participate instead of members of the public.

=== 2022 ===
Celebrity	Known for	Result
Jenny Eclair	Comedian	
James Fleet	Actor	Winner
Jamie Laing	Made in Chelsea	
Sunetra Sarker	Actress and TV presenter	

=== 2023 ===
Celebrity	Known for	Result
Hugh Dennis	Comedian and Actor	Winner
Sophie Duker	Stand-up comedian	
Alice Levine	Radio and TV presenter	
Joe Swash	Former EastEnders actor	

=== 2024 ===
Celebrity	Known for	Result
Babatunde Aleshe	Comedian	
Martin Kemp	Singer and actor	Winner
Rachel Riley	TV presenter	
Tom Rosenthal	Actor	

=== 2025 ===
Celebrity	Known for	Result
Amber Gill	TV Personality	
Sarah Hadland	Actress	
Colin Murray	Radio Presenter	Winner
Tim Vine	Comedian	

=== The Great Celebrity Pottery Throw Down ===
The five-part series hosted by Liza Tarbuck. Judges Keith Brymer Jones and Rich Miller started in September 2026

=== 2026 ===
Celebrity	Known for	Result
Lucy Beaumont	Comedian	
Fatiha El-Ghorri	Comedian	
Richard Herring	Comedian and writer	
Paul Merson	Former professional footballer	
Layton Williams	Actor	Winner
Denise van Outen	Presenter	

== International broadcasts ==
In July 2020, HBO Max secured the rights to distribute the show in the United States, where it premiered on 17 September 2020. As of July 2024, HBO Max has not released season 6 (originally aired January 2023 in the UK with season 7 starting January 2024) and has made no mention of it being released in the future. Currently, HBO Max only indicates 5 seasons exist on their website.

A Canadian version, The Great Canadian Pottery Throw Down, premiered on CBC Television on 8 February 2024.
