= The Mark Four =

- Also known as: Kenny Lee & The Mark Four
- Origin: Hertfordshire, England
- Genres: Pop rock; rock
- Years active: 1961–1965

The Mark Four was an English rock band from Hertfordshire, England. that was formed in 1961. Members included Kenny Pickett (vocals), Eddie Phillips (guitar), John Dalton (bass guitar), Mick Thompson (guitar) and Jack Jones (drums).

The group recorded its first single in March 1964 and released it in May that same year. Three more singles followed, the last of which was released in February 1966. During this span the group performed regularly, even seven days a week. The group even opened for a new club in Wilhelmshaven, Germany, called The Big Ben Club.

Dalton left to join The Kinks on 31 October 1965, and Bob Garner replaced him. Soon after this line-up change, the band became The Creation, and went on to record singles between 1966 and 1968, including the Top 40 hit, "Painter Man".
