= Making Time =

Song by English rock band The Creation

- 1966 Denmark issue

Single by The Creation

from the album We Are Paintermen
- B-side: "Try and Stop Me"
- Released: 17 June 1966
- Recorded: 18–19 May 1966
- Studio: IBC Studios, London
- Genre: Freakbeat; garage rock
- Length: 2:58
- Label: Planet/Philips
- Songwriters: Kenny Pickett; Eddie Phillips
- Producer: Shel Talmy

The Creation singles chronology
"Making Time" (1966)	"Painter Man" (1966)

"Making Time" is the debut single by English rock band the Creation, released in 1966. It was written by Kenny Pickett (lead singer) and Eddie Phillips. The lyrics portray the experience of working in a clock factory while co-workers listen to their favourites on the radio. The song features an electric guitar played with a violin bow.

== Cover versions ==
The song has been covered by Das Damen, Little Free Rock, Television Personalities, Circle Jerks and Green Bullfrog. You Am I released a version of the song on "Beat Party!", a bonus disc that came with initial copies of their album Hourly, Daily.

The single's B-side "Try and Stop Me" was covered by The Radiators from Space on their 1979 "Let's Talk About the Weather" single.

== Use in other media ==
It was featured on the soundtrack of the 1998 film Rushmore and in an Xfinity TV commercial in 2017. In the film The Reader (2008) it stood for a time shift from 1958 to the mid sixties playing as background music. It was also used in an Audi USA commercial in 2018. Since 2017, it has been the theme song of The Great Pottery Throw Down.

The mid-1980s band Makin' Time was named after the song.
