= The Creation (band) =

English rock band

- The Creation in 1966; Clockwise from bottom: Kenny Pickett, Bob Garner, Eddie Phillips, Jack Jones

Background information
- Also known as: The Mark Four; The Blue Jacks
- Origin: Cheshunt, England
- Genres: Freakbeat; psychedelic rock; garage rock
- Years active: 1966–1968; mid-1980s–present
- Labels: Sonet; Hit-Ton; Creation
- Members: Eddie Phillips; Tony Barber; Kevin Mann; Simon Tourle
- Past members: See members section

The Creation are an English rock band, formed in 1966. Their most notable songs are "Making Time", which was one of the first rock songs to feature a guitar played with a bow, and "Painter Man", which made the top 40 on the UK Singles Chart in late 1966, and reached No. 8 on the German chart in April 1967. It was covered by Boney M in 1979, and reached the No. 10 position on the UK chart. "Making Time" was used in the film Rushmore, and as the theme song from season 2 onwards of The Great Pottery Throw Down.

Creation biographer Sean Egan defined their style as "a unique hybrid of pop, rock, psychedelia and the avant garde."

== Career ==
=== Pre-history: The Mark Four (1963–1966) ===
Most of the members of what would eventually become Creation were initially members of The Mark Four, a British beat group based in Cheshunt, Hertfordshire. By late 1963 The Mark Four was a quintet consisting of Kenny Pickett (vocals), Eddie Phillips (guitars), Mick "Spud" Thompson (rhythm guitars), John Dalton (bass), and Jack Jones (drums). This lineup played regularly in the UK and in Germany before issuing two non-charting singles for Philips’ Mercury Records, "Rock Around The Clock" and "Try It Baby" in 1964.

Dalton then left the band. He later joined The Kinks as a replacement for Pete Quaife before being replaced by new bassist Tony Cooke. Around the same time, Thompson left the band and was not replaced. This Mark Four lineup issued two further non-charting singles: "Hurt Me If You Will" (Decca, August 1965) and "Work All Day (Sleep All Night)" (Fontana, February 1966).

In April 1966, the group signed a management deal with Tony Stratton Smith. He promptly suggested replacing Cooke with new bassist Bob Garner (previously of the Tony Sheridan Band), and a name change. The band took him up on both suggestions: it was Pickett who came up with the name The Creation, based on a reference he found in a book of Russian poetry.

=== Initial success (1966) ===
The band's style, produced by Shel Talmy, was, at this point, loud art pop, similar to early records by The Who. Their first single, "Making Time", was a Pickett/Phillips original featuring Phillips playing his electric guitar with a violin bow. (He was reputedly the first guitarist to use this technique.) Released in June 1966 on Talmy's own label, Planet (distributed in the UK by Philips and in the US by Jay-Gee), it reached No. 49 on the UK chart. Almost immediately thereafter, The Creation suffered another lineup change when Jack Jones was fired and replaced by new drummer Dave Preston. However, the band was unsatisfied with Preston's live work, and in less than three weeks Jones was asked back and rejoined the group.

Their next single, October 1966's "Painter Man", became their biggest hit, reaching No. 36 UK and the top 10 in Germany. The Creation took their pop art experimentation slightly further when, during live performances of "Painter Man," Pickett would spray-paint a canvas during their concerts before a member of the road crew would set fire to the artwork on stage.

=== The Bob Garner era (1967) ===
"Painter Man" was the last single issued by the original lineup, and their last single to chart in the UK. In early 1967, the band brought in Kim Gardner as their new bassist, and former bassist Bob Garner moved into the lead vocal slot in February 1967, leaving Kenny Pickett out of the group, at least for the time being.

This lineup issued its first single in June 1967 ("If I Stay Too Long" b/w "Nightmares"). Unsuccessful in the UK, the song did well in Germany, as did a German-only follow-up single ("Tom Tom"). Their commercial momentum in Germany was strong enough for a Creation album called We Are Paintermen to be issued in mid 1967 for the German and continental European market, compiled from previously issued singles and several newly recorded songs. By this time, the band's sound had developed into a more typically mid-1960s psychedelic rock sound, which has been retroactively described as freakbeat.

Also during late 1966 and 1967, four Creation singles were issued in the United States, without commercial success: "Making Time" b/w "Try And Stop Me" and "Painter Man" b/w "Biff Bang Pow" on US Planet (distributed by Jay-Gee/Jubilee), and "If I Stay Too Long" b/w "Nightmares" and "How Does It Feel To Feel" b/w "Life Is Just Beginning" on US Decca. The band remained popular in Germany, Sweden, Denmark and Norway.

The single "Life Is Just Beginning" was released in the UK towards the end of 1967, but almost immediately afterwards guitarist Eddie Phillps announced his departure. He was replaced for several European tour dates by guitarist Tony Ollard, but within a matter of weeks, vocalist Bob Garner also quit the group and by February 1968, The Creation had officially ceased to exist.

=== Pickett returns, band breaks up (1968) ===
However, demand was still strong in continental Europe for Creation records and live shows, and almost immediately after the band had disbanded drummer Jack Jones formed a new Creation lineup, bringing back Kenny Pickett as singer. Kim Gardner returned as bass player (after a stint in Santa Barbara Machine Head) and brought in his old bandmate from The Birds, Ronnie Wood on guitar.

This lineup debuted with the single "Midway Down", released in the UK and Germany in April 1968. However this Creation lineup splintered almost immediately, and by June, the band was no more. Two posthumous follow-up singles—"Bony Moronie" and "For All That I Am"—were German-only releases, appearing later in 1968.

Despite their early demise and lack of hits, The Creation posthumously became highly influential, acknowledged as an inspiration by Paul Weller, Ride, Pete Townshend, The Sex Pistols and others. Jimmy Page of Led Zeppelin imitated Phillips’ use of the violin bow, while Alan McGee named his massively successful record label Creation after them, and his band Biff Bang Pow! was named after the Creation song "Biff, Bang, Pow". Egan asserted, “only the Velvet Underground spring to mind as a band who profoundly affected fellow artists while remaining a secret from the wider public.”

=== Post-Creation careers ===
Eddie Phillips became bass player in P.P. Arnold's backing band during the late 1960s. He left the music business for a time in the 1970s, but by 1980 was collaborating again with Kenny Pickett as a songwriter. The two wrote the 1980 hit single "Teacher, Teacher" for Rockpile.

Kenny Pickett continued as songwriter for the Creation's American producer, Shel Talmy, and issued some solo recordings in the 1970s and 1980s. He later sang with The Kennedy Express. In 1970 he co-wrote Clive Dunn's number-one hit "Grandad", with session musician Herbie Flowers.

Ronnie Wood joined the Jeff Beck Group, and later The Faces and The Rolling Stones.

Kim Gardner co-formed Ashton, Gardner & Dyke and was later a member of Badger.

Bob Garner played in Warrington bands Magoos and Golliwog, who changed their name to Smiley for a single in 1972: "Penelope" (written by Kenny Pickett) b/w "I Know What I Want" (written by Garner). He later participated in various Creation reunions (see below).

Mick Avory was the drummer for the Kinks from 1964 to 1984.

=== Re-formations (1980s–present) ===
The Creation re-formed in the mid-1980s with Phillips, Pickett, Dalton, and Mick Avory (drums, ex-Kinks). In 1987, they released a single on Jet Records ("A Spirit Called Love" b/w a new version of "Making Time") to minimal attention. This lineup also recorded material for a new album in a more contemporary rock style (such as new wave), but this project was never completed (or even titled). The re-formed band continued to tour, with various lineup changes, capitalising on their cult notoriety with the underground mod and garage rock audiences.

In 1994, the original lineup (consisting of Phillips, Pickett, Garner and Jones) got together to record the album Power Surge, issued in 1996 on UK indie label Creation Records, which had been named in their honour. The 1990s band Ride, who had toured with The Creation in 1994, then recorded the song "How Does It Feel to Feel?" on their album Carnival of Light. Some years earlier The Godfathers, another UK alternative rock band of the time, had also included a cover of the song on their 1991 album Unreal world, so that the tune "How Does It Feel to Feel?" became quite popular in the 1990s in the UK indie scene.

Pickett died on 10 January 1997 but the group continued for a time with Garner as lead vocalist. The band performed in the United States for the first time in 2001.

In 2004, Cherry Red Records released Psychedelic Rose, made up of nine songs from the group's abandoned 1987/88 sessions including the tracks previously issued on the 1987 single, augmented by two spoken-word recollections of The Creation's history; the few reviews of the album were almost uniformly negative.

Garner and Jones both left the band sometime in the early 2000s; Garner died on 16 July 2016. The only original member left in the current lineup is Phillips. The most recent Creation touring lineup consists of Eddie Phillips (lead guitar, vocals), Simon Tourle (lead vocals), Tony Barber (bass), and Kevin Mann (drums).

== Members ==
=== Present members ===
- Eddie Phillips (born Edward Michael Phillips, 15 August 1945, Leytonstone) – vocals, lead guitar (1966–1967, mid-1980s–present)
- Tony Barber – vocals, bass guitar (early 2000s–present)
- Kevin Mann – drums (early 2000s–present)
- Simon Tourle – lead vocals (early 2000s–present)

=== Earlier members ===
- Bob Garner (born Robert Anthony Garner, 15 May 1946, Warrington – died 16 July 2016) – vocals, bass guitar (1966–1967, 1993–1997); lead vocals (1967–1968, 1997 – early 2000s; died 2016)
- Kenny Pickett (born Kenneth George Pickett, 3 September 1942, Ware, Hertfordshire – died 10 January 1997) – lead vocals (1966–1967, 1968, mid-1980s–1997; his death)
- Jack Jones (born Jack Llewleyn Jones, 8 November 1941, Northampton, Northamptonshire) – drums, vocals (1966, 1966–1968, 1993 – early 2000s)
- Dave Preston – drums (1966)
- Kim Gardner – bass, vocals (1967–1968; died 2001)
- Tony Ollard – lead guitar, vocals (1967–1968)
- Ronnie Wood – lead guitar, vocals (1968)
- John Dalton – bass guitar (mid-1980s–1993)
- Mick Avory – drums (mid-1980s–1993)

== Discography ==
=== Albums ===
- 1967 – We Are Paintermen (Hit-ton, issued in Germany, the Netherlands, France and Sweden only)
- 1987 – Psychedelic Rose: The Great Lost Creation Album (released in 2004 by Cherry Red)
- 1996 – Power Surge

=== Compilations and live albums ===
- 1968 – The Best of the Creation (Pop, issued in Germany and Sweden only)
- 1973 – Creation 66–67 (UK Charisma collection)
- 1975 – The Creation (UK collection)
- 1983 – The Mark Four/The Creation (Eva, French collection)
- 1982 – How Does It Feel to Feel? (Edsel, 12-inch LP)
- 1984 – Recreation (Line, 12-inch LP)
- 1985 – Live at the Beat Scene Club (7-inch EP)
- 1993 – Lay the Ghost (Universal)
- 1994 – Painter Man (Edsel, UK budget collection)
- 1998 – Our Music Is Red – with Purple Flashes (Diablo, UK collection)
- 1998 – Complete Collection, Vol. 1: Making Time (Retroactive)
- 1998 – Complete Collection, Vol. 2: Biff Bang Pow (Retroactive)
- 2007 – The Singles Collection (Get Back Italy)
- 2017 – Action Painting (Numero Group)
- 2022 – Making Time – The Best of the Creation

=== Singles ===
- June 1966 – "Making Time" / "Try and Stop Me" - UK Singles no. 49
- October 1966 – "Painter Man" / "Biff, Bang, Pow" - UK Singles No. 36
- 1967 – "Cool Jerk" / "Life Is Just Beginning" (Germany only)
- June 1967 – "If I Stay Too Long" / "Nightmares"
- October 1967 – "Life Is Just Beginning" / "Through My Eyes"
- February 1968 – "How Does It Feel to Feel" / "Tom Tom"
- May 1968 – "Midway Down" / "The Girls Are Naked" (Polydor 56246)
- 1968 – "Bony Moronie" b/w "Mercy, Mercy, Mercy" (Germany only, Hit-ton HT 300210)
- 1969 – "For All That I Am" b/w "Uncle Bert" (Hit-ton HT 300235, Germany)
- April 1987 – "A Spirit Called Love" / "Making Time" (+ bonus track "Mumbo Jumbo" on 12-inch EP)
- July 1994 – "Creation" / "Shock Horror" (limited numbered 7-inch – Creation Records CRE200)
- July 1994 – "Creation" / "Shock Horror" / "Power Surge" (CD single)
- July 2008 – "Red with Purple Flashes" (one-sided promo – strictly limited 200 only Planet 240708)

=== DVDs ===
- 2004 – Red with Purple Flashes: The Creation Live (Cherry Red)
