= Eddie Phillips (musician) =

- Birth name: Edwin Michael Phillips
- Born: 15 August 1945 (age 79); Leyton, London, England
- Years active: 1960s–present

Edwin Michael "Eddie" Phillips (born 15 August 1945, Leytonstone, London) is a British guitarist who rose to some prominence during the 1960s as a member of the rock band the Creation.

== Biography ==
As a member of the Creation, Phillips was one of the figureheads of the new wave of British guitar heroes, and it was reported that Pete Townshend asked him to join The Who as a second guitarist, although this is now believed to be a 1960s publicity story and Phillips has regularly denied any knowledge of the invitation. "If he asked me, I didn't hear him," said Phillips in a 1988 interview with Chris Hunt of Guitarist magazine. "I think that was a bit of sharp press."

Phillips was the first guitarist to use a violin bow with a guitar, a technique he experimented with while in his first band the Mark Four and he perfected the style with the Creation, committing the sound to vinyl on the Creation's only UK chart hits, "Making Time" and "Painter Man", both released in 1966. Although Phillips was the originator, Jimmy Page of Led Zeppelin later popularised the technique to a wider audience, leading many to erroneously believe that Page, and not Phillips, was the pioneer of the style.

Apart from being a guitarist, Phillips was also an accomplished songwriter and singer. He helped pen many of the Creation's best known songs, including "Painter Man" and "Making Time". Successful cover versions of his songs include the UK top ten hit "Painter Man" by Boney M and "Teacher, Teacher" by Rockpile. "Making Time" was featured on the Rushmore soundtrack, and "Teacher, Teacher" appeared in the opening credits for the 2011 film Bad Teacher.

After leaving the Creation (he was replaced briefly by Ronnie Wood), Phillips joined P. P. Arnold's TNT Soul Band on bass, featuring on her hit "Angel of the Morning" and the album Kafunta, before quitting music and reportedly becoming a bus driver. He reunited with the Creation's producer Shel Talmy in the 1970s, releasing the single "Limbo Jimbo." In 1979, he teamed up with former Creation singer Kenny Pickett as Kennedy Express, recording two singles. Pickett and Phillips later reunited the original Creation lineup in 1993, resulting in a series of dates and a studio album, before Pickett's death in 1996.

Phillips is still writing, recording and playing live with the reformed Creation (which for a time included original member Bob Garner). In recent years, the Creation has toured the UK, the US and parts of Europe.
