= Shut Up and Dance: Mixes =

Remix album by Paula Abdul
- Released: May 8, 1990
- Recorded: 1987 – March 1990
- Genre: Dance
- Length: 49:53
- Label: Virgin

Paula Abdul chronology
| Forever Your Girl (1988) | Shut Up and Dance: Mixes (1990) | Spellbound (1991) |

Singles from Shut Up and Dance: Mixes
- 1. "1990 Medley Mix" Released: August 1990

Professional ratings
Review scores
| Source | Rating |
|---|---|
| AllMusic | 2/5 stars |
| The Encyclopedia of Popular Music | 2/5 stars |
| Entertainment Weekly | B− |
| The Rolling Stone Album Guide | 1/5 stars |
| Select | 1/5 medals |

Shut Up and Dance: Mixes is a Paula Abdul remix album, released in 1990. It contains dance remixes of the six hit singles from Abdul's debut album Forever Your Girl, one remixed album track, and one medley. It was another huge success for Abdul, peaking at No. 7 on the Billboard 200.

Following Abdul's continued UK singles success throughout 1990, Shut Up and Dance was re-released there late in the same year, featuring an additional four tracks.

There were two singles and accompanying music videos released from the project—the "1990 Medley Mix" and "Straight Up (Ultimix Mix)".

== Track listing ==
| No. | Title | Writer(s) | Producer(s) | Length |
|---|---|---|---|---|
| 1. | "Cold Hearted" (Quiverin' 12") | Elliot Wolff | Wolff | 5:12 |
| 2. | "Straight Up" (Ultimix mix) | Wolff | Wolff | 6:55 |
| 3. | "One or the Other" (1990 mix) | Paula Abdul • Curtis Williams • Duncan Pain | Williams | 6:43 |
| 4. | "Forever Your Girl" (Frankie Foncett mix) | Oliver Leiber | Leiber | 6:07 |
| 5. | "Knocked Out" (Pettibone 12") | Babyface • Daryl Simmons • L.A. Reid | Reid • Babyface | 6:11 |
| 6. | "The Way That You Love Me" (Houseafire edit) | Leiber | Leiber | 4:42 |
| 7. | "Opposites Attract" (1990 mix) | Leiber | Leiber | 6:49 |
| 8. | "1990 Medley Mix" ("Straight Up" • "Knocked Out" • "Opposites Attract" • "Forever Your Girl" • "State of Attraction" • "The Way That You Love Me" • "Cold Hearted") | Wolff • Babyface • Simmons • Reid • Leiber • Glen Ballard • Siedah Garrett | Wolff • Reid • Babyface • Leiber • Ballard | 7:14 |

UK edition bonus tracks
| No. | Title | Writer(s) | Producer(s) | Length |
|---|---|---|---|---|
| 9. | "Knocked Out" (Power mix) | Babyface • Simmons • Reid | Reid • Babyface | 6:44 |
| 10. | "Opposites Attract" (Shep's Special mix) | Leiber | Leiber | 6:43 |
| 11. | "Forever Your Girl" (Shep's Special mix) | Leiber | Leiber | 6:27 |
| 12. | "Cold Hearted" (Chad Jackson 12" remix) | Wolff | Wolff | 5:38 |

== Charts and certifications ==
=== Weekly charts ===
| Chart (1990) | Peak position |
|---|---|
| Australian Albums (ARIA) | 16 |
| Canada Top Albums/CDs (RPM) | 14 |
| Dutch Albums (Album Top 100) | 29 |
| European Albums (Music & Media) | 74 |
| French Albums (SNEP) | 44 |
| German Albums (Offizielle Top 100) | 37 |
| New Zealand Albums (RMNZ) | 4 |
| Swedish Albums (Sverigetopplistan) | 24 |
| UK Albums (Official Charts) | 40 |
| US Billboard 200 | 7 |
| US Top R&B/Hip-Hop Albums (Billboard) | 65 |

=== Year-end charts ===
| Chart (1990) | Position |
|---|---|
| Canada Top Albums/CDs (RPM) | 66 |
| New Zealand Albums (RMNZ) | 42 |
| US Billboard 200 | 54 |

=== Certifications and sales ===
| Region | Certification | Certified units/sales |
|---|---|---|
| Canada (Music Canada) | Platinum | 100,000^{^} |
| New Zealand (RMNZ) | Gold | 7,500^{^} |
| United States (RIAA) | Platinum | 1,000,000^{^} |
^{^} Shipments figures based on certification alone.

== See also ==
- List of best-selling remix albums worldwide
