= List of Billboard Hot 100 top-ten singles in 1989 =

This is a list of singles that have peaked in the Top 10 of the Billboard Hot 100 during 1989.

A total 124 songs reached the top ten in 1989, only 117 of them peaked in 1989 (the other seven peaked in either 1988 or 1990). 33 songs peaked at number one that year, tying the previous year, 1988 with the second-most number-one songs of the year, while 14 singles reached a peak of number two.

New Kids on the Block scored six top ten hits during the year with "You Got It (The Right Stuff)", "I'll Be Loving You (Forever)", "Hangin' Tough", "Cover Girl", "Didn't I (Blow Your Mind)", and "This One's for the Children", the most among all other artists.

== Top-ten singles ==
- (#) – 1989 Year-end top 10 single position and rank

List of Billboard Hot 100 top ten singles which peaked in 1989
Top ten entry date	Single	Artist(s)	Peak	Peak date	Weeks in top ten
Singles from 1988
December 10	"My Prerogative" (#2)	Bobby Brown	1	January 14	7
December 24	"Two Hearts"	Phil Collins	1	January 21	7
December 24	"In Your Room"	The Bangles	5	January 7	4
December 24	"Don't Rush Me"	Taylor Dayne	2	January 21	7
Singles from 1989
January 7	"Armageddon It"	Def Leppard	3	January 21	5
January 7	"Smooth Criminal"	Michael Jackson	7	January 14	3
January 14	"I Remember Holding You"	Boys Club	8	January 14	1
January 14	"Put a Little Love in Your Heart"	Annie Lennox & Al Green	9	January 14	2
January 14	"The Way You Love Me"	Karyn White	7	February 4	4
January 21	"When I'm with You"	Sheriff	1	February 4	5
January 21	"When the Children Cry"	White Lion	3	February 4	4
January 28	"Straight Up" (#4)	Paula Abdul	1	February 11	7
January 28	"Born to Be My Baby"	Bon Jovi	3	February 18	5
January 28	"Wild Thing"	Tone Lōc	2	February 18	6
January 28	"All This Time"	Tiffany	6	February 11	3
February 11	"The Lover in Me"	Sheena Easton	2	March 4	5
February 11	"I Wanna Have Some Fun"	Samantha Fox	8	February 11	1
February 11	"She Wants to Dance with Me"	Rick Astley	6	February 25	3
February 11	"Walking Away"	Information Society	9	February 18	3
February 18	"Lost in Your Eyes"	Debbie Gibson	1	March 4	7
February 18	"What I Am"	Edie Brickell & New Bohemians	7	March 4	3
February 18	"You Got It (The Right Stuff)"	New Kids on the Block	3	March 11	5
February 25	"The Living Years"	Mike + The Mechanics	1	March 25	6
March 4	"Roni"	Bobby Brown	3	March 18	4
March 4	"Surrender to Me"	Ann Wilson & Robin Zander	6	March 11	2
March 4	"Paradise City"	Guns N' Roses	5	March 11	3
March 11	"Girl You Know It's True" (#8)	Milli Vanilli	2	April 1	7
March 11	"My Heart Can't Tell You No"	Rod Stewart	4	April 1	5
March 18	"Eternal Flame"	The Bangles	1	April 1	6
March 18	"The Look"	Roxette	1	April 8	7
March 18	"Don't Tell Me Lies"	Breathe	10	March 18	1
March 25	"She Drives Me Crazy"	Fine Young Cannibals	1	April 15	7
March 25	"Walk the Dinosaur"	Was (Not Was)	7	April 1	3
March 25	"You're Not Alone"	Chicago	10	March 25	1
April 1	"Stand"	R.E.M.	6	April 8	4
April 1	"Dreamin'"	Vanessa Williams	8	April 8	2
April 8	"Like a Prayer"	Madonna	1	April 22	7
April 8	"Funky Cold Medina"	Tone Lōc	3	April 29	5
April 15	"Superwoman"	Karyn White	8	April 15	1
April 15	"You Got It"	Roy Orbison	9	April 15	1
April 15	"Your Mama Don't Dance"	Poison	10	April 15	1
April 22	"I'll Be There for You"	Bon Jovi	1	May 13	6
April 22	"Heaven Help Me"	Deon Estus & George Michael	5	April 29	2
April 22	"Second Chance"	Thirty Eight Special	6	May 6	4
April 29	"Real Love"	Jody Watley	2	May 20	6
April 29	"After All (Love Theme from Chances Are)"	Cher & Peter Cetera	6	May 13	4
April 29	"Forever Your Girl"	Paula Abdul	1	May 20	6
May 6	"Soldier of Love"	Donny Osmond	2	June 3	6
May 6	"Room to Move"	Animotion	9	May 6	1
May 13	"Rock On"	Michael Damian	1	June 3	5
May 13	"Patience"	Guns N' Roses	4	June 3	5
May 13	"Wind Beneath My Wings" (#7)	Bette Midler	1	June 10	7
May 20	"Every Little Step"	Bobby Brown	3	June 10	6
May 27	"I'll Be Loving You (Forever)"	New Kids on the Block	1	June 17	6
May 27	"Close My Eyes Forever"	Lita Ford & Ozzy Osbourne	8	June 17	4
June 3	"Buffalo Stance"	Neneh Cherry	3	June 24	6
June 10	"Satisfied"	Richard Marx	1	June 24	5
June 10	"Where Are You Now?"	Jimmy Harnen with Synch	10	June 10	1
June 17	"Baby Don't Forget My Number"	Milli Vanilli	1	July 1	6
June 17	"Good Thing"	Fine Young Cannibals	1	July 8	6
June 17	"This Time I Know It's for Real"	Donna Summer	7	June 24	3
June 17	"Cry"	Waterfront	10	June 17	2
June 24	"Miss You Like Crazy"	Natalie Cole	7	July 8	4
July 1	"If You Don't Know Me By Now"	Simply Red	1	July 15	6
July 1	"Express Yourself"	Madonna	2	July 15	5
July 1	"I Drove All Night"	Cyndi Lauper	6	July 8	2
July 8	"Toy Soldiers"	Martika	1	July 22	6
July 8	"What You Don't Know"	Exposé	8	July 15	3
July 15	"Batdance"	Prince	1	August 5	6
July 15	"The Doctor"	The Doobie Brothers	9	July 15	1
July 15	"So Alive"	Love and Rockets	3	August 5	6
July 22	"On Our Own"	Bobby Brown	2	August 5	6
July 22	"Lay Your Hands on Me"	Bon Jovi	7	July 29	4
July 29	"Once Bitten, Twice Shy"	Great White	5	August 12	5
July 29	"I Like It"	Dino	7	August 12	4
July 29	"Right Here Waiting"	Richard Marx	1	August 12	7
August 5	"Cold Hearted" (#6)	Paula Abdul	1	September 2	8
August 12	"Don't Wanna Lose You"	Gloria Estefan	1	September 16	8
August 19	"Hangin' Tough"	New Kids on the Block	1	September 9	6
August 19	"Secret Rendezvous"	Karyn White	6	August 26	3
August 26	"The End of the Innocence"	Don Henley	8	August 26	2
August 26	"Friends"	Jody Watley featuring Eric B. & Rakim	9	August 26	2
August 26	"Angel Eyes"	Jeff Healey Band	5	September 2	4
September 2	"Heaven"	Warrant	2	September 23	7
September 2	"Shower Me with Your Love"	Surface	5	September 16	4
September 9	"Girl I'm Gonna Miss You"	Milli Vanilli	1	September 23	6
September 9	"If I Could Turn Back Time"	Cher	3	September 23	5
September 9	"18 and Life"	Skid Row	4	September 23	5
September 16	"Cherish"	Madonna	2	October 7	5
September 23	"Miss You Much" (#5)	Janet Jackson	1	October 7	8
September 30	"One"	Bee Gees	7	September 30	1
September 30	"Kisses on the Wind"	Neneh Cherry	8	September 30	1
September 30	"Lovesong"	The Cure	2	October 21	4
October 7	"Mixed Emotions"	The Rolling Stones	5	October 14	3
October 7	"Bust a Move"	Young MC	7	October 14	4
October 7	"It's No Crime"	Babyface	7	October 28	4
October 14	"Sowing the Seeds of Love"	Tears for Fears	2	October 28	5
October 14	"Listen to Your Heart"	Roxette	1	November 4	6
October 21	"Cover Girl"	New Kids on the Block	2	November 4	4
October 21	"Love in an Elevator"	Aerosmith	5	October 28	3
October 21	"When I Looked at Him"	Exposé	10	October 21	1
October 28	"Dr. Feelgood"	Mötley Crüe	6	October 28	2
October 28	"When I See You Smile"	Bad English	1	November 11	6
October 28	"Rock Wit'cha"	Bobby Brown	7	November 4	3
November 4	"(It's Just) The Way That You Love Me"	Paula Abdul	3	December 2	6
November 4	"Love Shack"	The B-52's	3	November 18	6
November 11	"Blame It on the Rain"	Milli Vanilli	1	November 25	6
November 11	"Didn't I (Blow Your Mind)"	New Kids on the Block	8	November 18	2
November 18	"We Didn't Start the Fire"	Billy Joel	1	December 9	8
November 18	"Angelia"	Richard Marx	4	December 2	4
November 18	"Poison"	Alice Cooper	7	November 25	3
November 18	"Back to Life"	Soul II Soul	4	December 16	7
November 25	"Don't Know Much"	Linda Ronstadt featuring Aaron Neville	2	December 23	8
November 25	"Another Day in Paradise"	Phil Collins	1	December 23	10
December 9	"With Every Beat of My Heart"	Taylor Dayne	5	December 16	6
December 16	"Living in Sin"	Bon Jovi	9	December 16	3
December 16	"Just Like Jesse James"	Cher	8	December 23	5

=== 1988 peaks ===
List of Billboard Hot 100 top ten singles in 1989 which peaked in 1988
Top ten entry date	Single	Artist(s)	Peak	Peak date	Weeks in top ten
November 19	"Look Away" (#1)	Chicago	1	December 10	8
November 26	"Giving You the Best That I Got" (#10)	Anita Baker	3	December 17	7
December 3	"Waiting for a Star to Fall"	Boy Meets Girl	5	December 17	6
December 3	"Every Rose Has Its Thorn" (#3)	Poison	1	December 24	8

=== 1990 peaks ===
List of Billboard Hot 100 top ten singles in 1989 which peaked in 1990
Top ten entry date	Single	Artist(s)	Peak	Peak date	Weeks in top ten
December 9	"Pump Up the Jam"	Technotronic	2	January 20	9
December 16	"Rhythm Nation"	Janet Jackson	2	January 6	6
December 23	"This One's for the Children"	New Kids on the Block	7	January 6	4

== See also ==
- 1989 in music
- List of Billboard Hot 100 number ones of 1989
- Billboard Year-End Hot 100 singles of 1989
