= Billboard Year-End Hot 100 singles of 1989 =

Ranking of recorded music

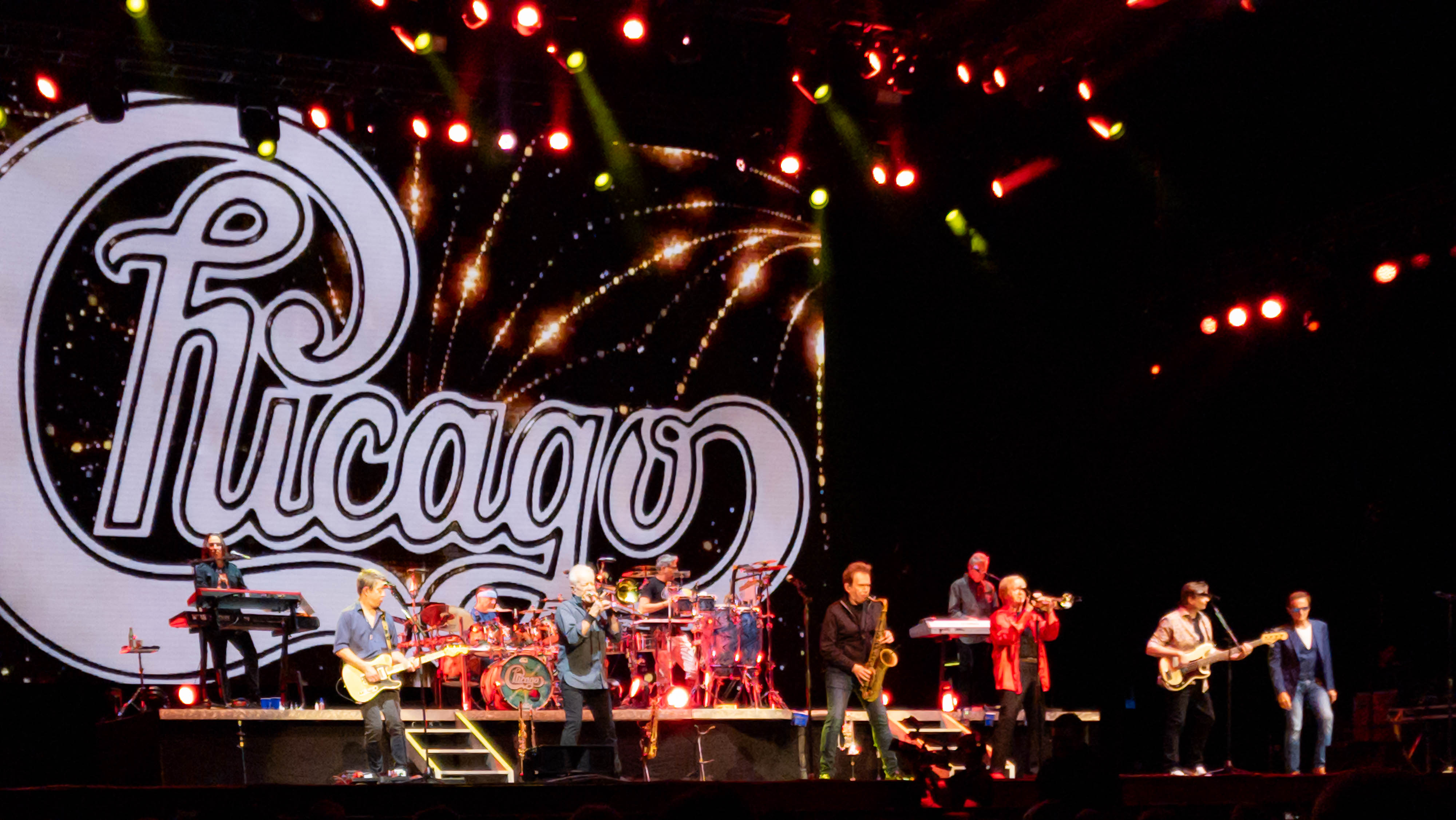
"Look Away" by Chicago was the number one song of 1989.

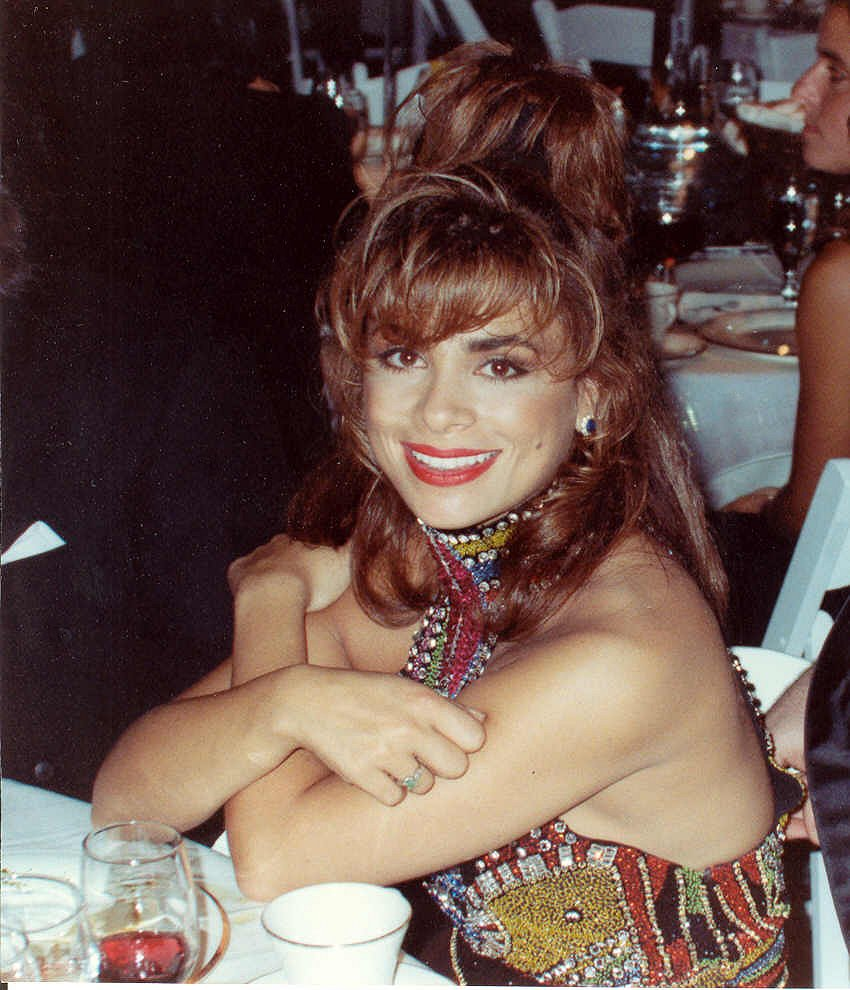
"Straight Up" and "Cold Hearted" from Paula Abdul's (pictured) debut studio album Forever Your Girl appeared at numbers four and six on the year-end list, while its title track charted at number 30.

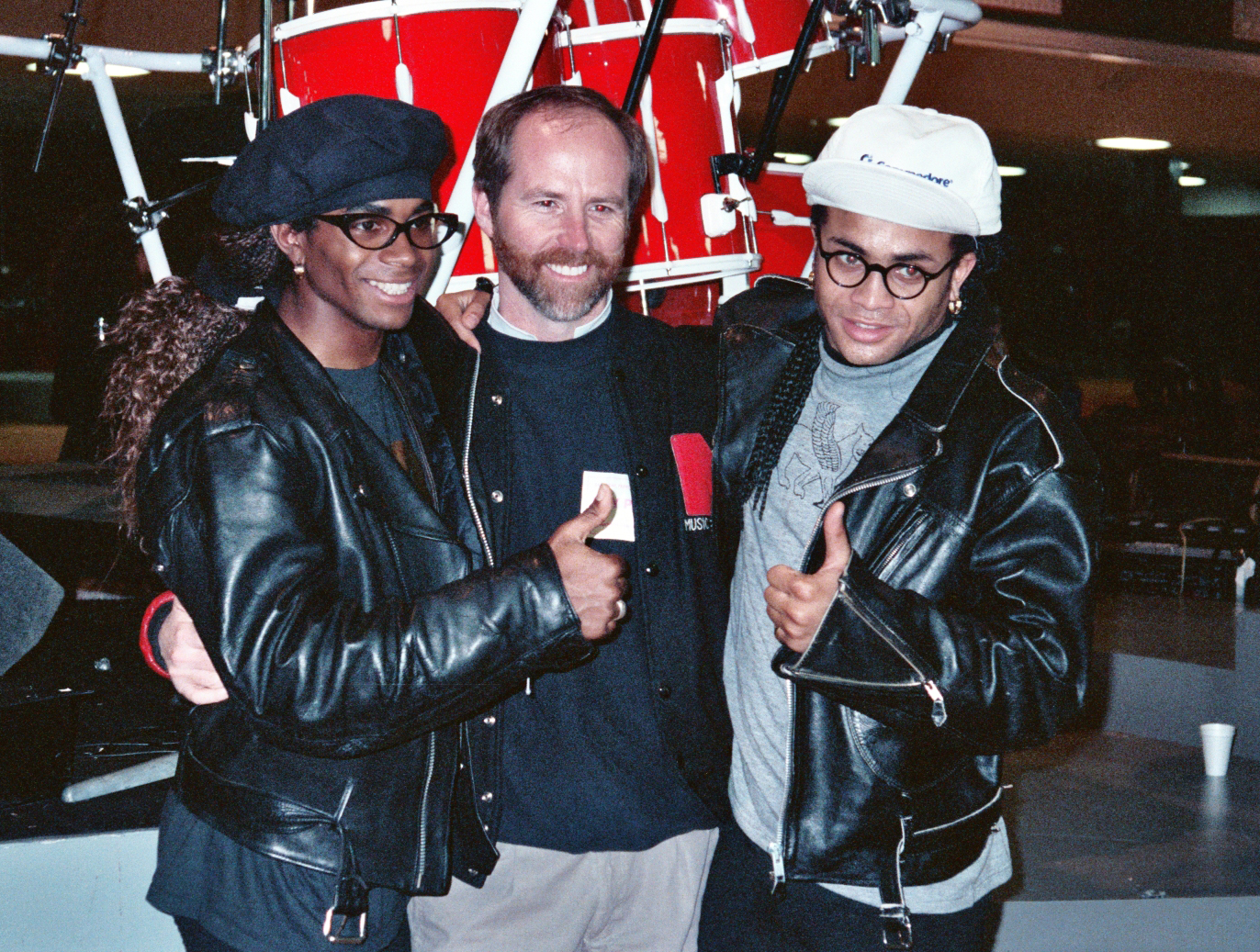
German duo Milli Vanilli (pictured, left and right) had four songs in the top 30 of the chart from their studio album Girl You Know It's True: its title track, "Girl I'm Gonna Miss You", "Blame It on the Rain", and "Baby Don't Forget My Number". They are tied with New Kids on the Block for the second most songs on the chart. Bobby Brown has the most with 5.

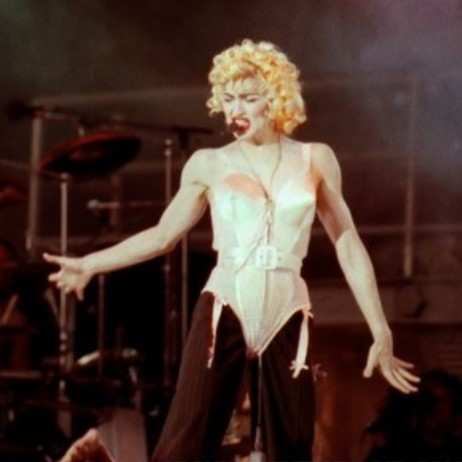
Three songs by Madonna (pictured) from her album Like a Prayer, including its title track, appeared on the chart.

This is a list of Billboard magazine's Top Hot 100 songs of 1989.

No.	Title	Artist(s)
1	"Look Away"	Chicago
2	"My Prerogative"	Bobby Brown
3	"Every Rose Has Its Thorn"	Poison
4	"Straight Up"	Paula Abdul
5	"Miss You Much"	Janet Jackson
6	"Cold Hearted"	Paula Abdul
7	"Wind Beneath My Wings"	Bette Midler
8	"Girl You Know It's True"	Milli Vanilli
9	"Baby, I Love Your Way/Freebird Medley"	Will to Power
10	"Giving You the Best That I Got"	Anita Baker
11	"Right Here Waiting"	Richard Marx
12	"Waiting for a Star to Fall"	Boy Meets Girl
13	"Lost in Your Eyes"	Debbie Gibson
14	"Don't Wanna Lose You"	Gloria Estefan
15	"Heaven"	Warrant
16	"Girl I'm Gonna Miss You"	Milli Vanilli
17	"The Look"	Roxette
18	"She Drives Me Crazy"	Fine Young Cannibals
19	"On Our Own"	Bobby Brown
20	"Two Hearts"	Phil Collins
21	"Blame It on the Rain"	Milli Vanilli
22	"Listen to Your Heart"	Roxette
23	"I'll Be There for You"	Bon Jovi
24	"If You Don't Know Me by Now"	Simply Red
25	"Like a Prayer"	Madonna
26	"I'll Be Loving You (Forever)"	New Kids on the Block
27	"How Can I Fall?"	Breathe
28	"Baby Don't Forget My Number"	Milli Vanilli
29	"Toy Soldiers"	Martika
30	"Forever Your Girl"	Paula Abdul
31	"The Living Years"	Mike + The Mechanics
32	"Eternal Flame"	The Bangles
33	"Wild Thing"	Tone Loc
34	"When I See You Smile"	Bad English
35	"If I Could Turn Back Time"	Cher
36	"Buffalo Stance"	Neneh Cherry
37	"When I'm with You"	Sheriff
38	"Don't Rush Me"	Taylor Dayne
39	"Born to Be My Baby"	Bon Jovi
40	"Good Thing"	Fine Young Cannibals
41	"The Lover in Me"	Sheena Easton
42	"Bust a Move"	Young MC
43	"Once Bitten, Twice Shy"	Great White
44	"Batdance"	Prince
45	"Rock On"	Michael Damian
46	"Real Love"	Jody Watley
47	"Love Shack"	The B-52's
48	"Every Little Step"	Bobby Brown
49	"Hangin' Tough"	New Kids on the Block
50	"My Heart Can't Tell You No"	Rod Stewart
51	"So Alive"	Love and Rockets
52	"You Got It (The Right Stuff)"	New Kids on the Block
53	"Armageddon It"	Def Leppard
54	"Satisfied"	Richard Marx
55	"Express Yourself"	Madonna
56	"I Like It"	Dino
57	"Soldier of Love"	Donny Osmond
58	"Sowing the Seeds of Love"	Tears for Fears
59	"Cherish"	Madonna
60	"When the Children Cry"	White Lion
61	"18 and Life"	Skid Row
62	"I Don't Want Your Love"	Duran Duran
63	"Second Chance"	.38 Special
64	"The Way You Love Me"	Karyn White
65	"Funky Cold Medina"	Tone Loc
66	"In Your Room"	The Bangles
67	"Miss You Like Crazy"	Natalie Cole
68	"Lovesong"	The Cure
69	"Secret Rendezvous"	Karyn White
70	"Angel Eyes"	The Jeff Healey Band
71	"Patience"	Guns N' Roses
72	"Walk on Water"	Eddie Money
73	"Cover Girl"	New Kids on the Block
74	"Welcome to the Jungle"	Guns N' Roses
75	"Shower Me With Your Love"	Surface
76	"Stand"	R.E.M.
77	"Close My Eyes Forever"	Lita Ford and Ozzy Osbourne
78	"All This Time"	Tiffany
79	"After All"	Cher and Peter Cetera
80	"Roni"	Bobby Brown
81	"Love in an Elevator"	Aerosmith
82	"Lay Your Hands on Me"	Bon Jovi
83	"The Promise"	When in Rome
84	"What I Am"	Edie Brickell & New Bohemians
85	"I Remember Holding You"	Boys Club
86	"Paradise City"	Guns N' Roses
87	"I Wanna Have Some Fun"	Samantha Fox
88	"She Wants to Dance with Me"	Rick Astley
89	"Dreamin'"	Vanessa Williams
90	"It's No Crime"	Babyface
91	"Poison"	Alice Cooper
92	"This Time I Know It's for Real"	Donna Summer
93	"Smooth Criminal"	Michael Jackson
94	"Heaven Help Me"	Deon Estus
95	"Rock Wit'cha"	Bobby Brown
96	"Thinking of You"	Sa-Fire
97	"What You Don't Know"	Exposé
98	"Surrender to Me"	Ann Wilson and Robin Zander
99	"The End of the Innocence"	Don Henley
100	"Keep on Movin'"	Soul II Soul

== See also ==
- 1989 in music
- List of Billboard Hot 100 number-one singles of 1989
- List of Billboard Hot 100 top-ten singles in 1989
- Billboard Year-End Hot Black Singles of 1989
- Billboard Year-End Hot Rap Singles of 1989
