= The Wild Pair (duo) =

- Genres: Dance, R&B, hip hop
- Label: Virgin

The Wild Pair, whose real names are Bruce DeShazer and Marv Gunn, was a singing duo and voice actors who were primarily known for their 1989 hit duet with Paula Abdul, "Opposites Attract" (in the video their part was performed by cartoon character MC Skat Kat, a.k.a. rapper Derrick "Delite" Stevens). They have also provided background vocals on her other hits, "Forever Your Girl" and "(It's Just) The Way That You Love Me."

"Opposites Attract" was an international hit. In the U.S., it peaked at No. 1 on Billboard's Hot 100. The song was featured on three of Abdul's albums, Forever Your Girl, Shut Up and Dance: Mixes, and the 2000 release Greatest Hits.

"Opposites Attract" was not the Wild Pair's only hit. In 1992, singer Stacy Earl released her single "Romeo & Juliet," a duet with The Wild Pair. The song reached the Top 40 on the Billboard Hot 100 chart.

DeShazer (also known as Tony Christian) and Gunn had previously been members of the band Mazarati, who were proteges of Brownmark.

== Filmography ==
- Opposites Attract (1989) ... MC Skat Kat (voice)
