= List of Billboard Hot 100 number ones of 1989 =

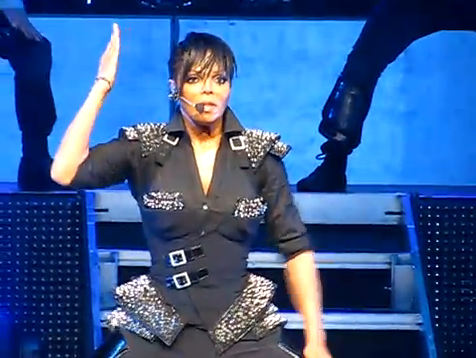
Janet Jackson (pictured) earned her second Hot 100 number-one single with "Miss You Much", which stayed at the top position for four straight weeks.

These are the Billboard Hot 100 number-one singles of 1989. The two longest running number-one singles of 1989 are "Miss You Much" by Janet Jackson and "Another Day in Paradise" by Phil Collins, which each charted at number one for four weeks. "Another Day in Paradise" attained two weeks at number one in 1989 and two more weeks in 1990, achieving four weeks at the top. 1989 ties with 1988 by having the second most number-one hits with 32 songs going to number one during the year.

That year, 12 acts earned their first number one song: Bobby Brown, Sheriff, Paula Abdul, Mike + the Mechanics, Roxette, Fine Young Cannibals, Michael Damian, Bette Midler, New Kids on the Block, Milli Vanilli, Martika, and Bad English. Phil Collins, Paula Abdul, Roxette, Fine Young Cannibals, New Kids on the Block, Richard Marx, and Milli Vanilli were the only acts to hit number one more than once, with Paula Abdul and Milli Vanilli having the most with three, and Phil Collins, Roxette, Fine Young Cannibals, New Kids on the Block, and Richard Marx with two.

== Chart history ==
Key
The #1 song of 1989, "Look Away" by Chicago, despite reaching #1 in late 1988, never reached #1 in 1989.

No.	Issue date	Song	Artist(s)	Ref.
678	January 7	"Every Rose Has Its Thorn"	Poison	
679	January 14	"My Prerogative"	Bobby Brown	
680	January 21	"Two Hearts"	Phil Collins	
680	January 28	"Two Hearts"	Phil Collins	
681	February 4	"When I'm with You"	Sheriff	
682	February 11	"Straight Up"	Paula Abdul	
682	February 18	"Straight Up"	Paula Abdul	
682	February 25	"Straight Up"	Paula Abdul	
683	March 4	"Lost in Your Eyes"	Debbie Gibson	
683	March 11	"Lost in Your Eyes"	Debbie Gibson	
683	March 18	"Lost in Your Eyes"	Debbie Gibson	
684	March 25	"The Living Years"	Mike + the Mechanics	
685	April 1	"Eternal Flame"	The Bangles	
686	April 8	"The Look"	Roxette	
687	April 15	"She Drives Me Crazy"	Fine Young Cannibals	
688	April 22	"Like a Prayer"	Madonna	
688	April 29	"Like a Prayer"	Madonna	
688	May 6	"Like a Prayer"	Madonna	
689	May 13	"I'll Be There for You"	Bon Jovi	
690	May 20	"Forever Your Girl"	Paula Abdul	
690	May 27	"Forever Your Girl"	Paula Abdul	
691	June 3	"Rock On"	Michael Damian	
692	June 10	"Wind Beneath My Wings"	Bette Midler	
693	June 17	"I'll Be Loving You (Forever)"	New Kids on the Block	
694	June 24	"Satisfied"	Richard Marx	
695	July 1	"Baby Don't Forget My Number"	Milli Vanilli	
696	July 8	"Good Thing"	Fine Young Cannibals	
697	July 15	"If You Don't Know Me by Now"	Simply Red	
698	July 22	"Toy Soldiers"	Martika	
698	July 29	"Toy Soldiers"	Martika	
699	August 5	"Batdance"	Prince	
700	August 12	"Right Here Waiting"	Richard Marx	
700	August 19	"Right Here Waiting"	Richard Marx	
700	August 26	"Right Here Waiting"	Richard Marx	
701	September 2	"Cold Hearted"	Paula Abdul	
702	September 9	"Hangin' Tough"	New Kids on the Block	
703	September 16	"Don't Wanna Lose You"	Gloria Estefan	
704	September 23	"Girl I'm Gonna Miss You"	Milli Vanilli	
704	September 30	"Girl I'm Gonna Miss You"	Milli Vanilli	
705	October 7	"Miss You Much"	Janet Jackson	
705	October 14	"Miss You Much"	Janet Jackson	
705	October 21	"Miss You Much"	Janet Jackson	
705	October 28	"Miss You Much"	Janet Jackson	
706	November 4	"Listen to Your Heart"	Roxette	
707	November 11	"When I See You Smile"	Bad English	
707	November 18	"When I See You Smile"	Bad English	
708	November 25	"Blame It on the Rain"	Milli Vanilli	
708	December 2	"Blame It on the Rain"	Milli Vanilli	
709	December 9	"We Didn't Start the Fire"	Billy Joel	
709	December 16	"We Didn't Start the Fire"	Billy Joel	
710	December 23	"Another Day in Paradise"	Phil Collins	
710	December 30 (Note: This was an unpublished week, due to a special double issue that Billboard published in print the previous week, for the year-end charts, and covered two weeks; all Billboard weekly charts were "frozen" during the break.)	"Another Day in Paradise"	Phil Collins	

== Number-one artists ==
List of number-one artists by total weeks at number one
Position	Artist	Weeks at No. 1
1	Paula Abdul	6
2	Milli Vanilli	5
3	Phil Collins	4
3	Richard Marx	4
3	Janet Jackson	4
6	Debbie Gibson	3
6	Madonna	3
8	Roxette	2
8	Fine Young Cannibals	2
8	New Kids on the Block	2
8	Martika	2
8	Bad English	2
8	Billy Joel	2
14	Poison	1
14	Bobby Brown	1
14	Sheriff	1
14	Mike + the Mechanics	1
14	The Bangles	1
14	Bon Jovi	1
14	Michael Damian	1
14	Bette Midler	1
14	Simply Red	1
14	Prince	1
14	Gloria Estefan	1

== See also ==
- 1989 in music
- List of Billboard number-one singles
- List of Billboard Hot 100 number-one singles of the 1980s

== Additional sources ==
- Fred Bronson's Billboard Book of Number 1 Hits, 5th Edition (ISBN 0-8230-7677-6)
- Joel Whitburn's Top Pop Singles 1955-2008, 12 Edition (ISBN 0-89820-180-2)
- Joel Whitburn Presents the Billboard Hot 100 Charts: The Eighties (ISBN 0-89820-079-2)
- Additional information obtained can be verified within Billboard's online archive services and print editions of the magazine.
