= Opposites Attract =

1989 single by Paula Abdul

Single by Paula Abdul

from the album Forever Your Girl
- B-side: "One or the Other"
- Released: November 17, 1989
- Studio: Creation Audio (Minneapolis, Minnesota); Kren (Hollywood, California); JHL (Palisades, California)
- Genre: Minneapolis sound; R&B
- Length: 4:24 (album version); 3:45 (single version)
- Label: Virgin
- Songwriter: Oliver Leiber
- Producer: Oliver Leiber

Paula Abdul singles chronology
"Cold Hearted" (1989)	"Opposites Attract" (1989)	"Rush Rush" (1991)

Music video
- "Opposites Attract" on YouTube

"Opposites Attract" is a song by American singer Paula Abdul from her debut album, Forever Your Girl (1988). It was released on November 17, 1989, as the sixth and final single from the album through Virgin Records. The song was written and produced by Oliver Leiber, with additional vocals provided by Bruce DeShazer and Marv Gunn (the Wild Pair). The single version also features rap vocals by Derrick Delite. Lyrically, it depicts a romantic relationship between two people with contrasting personalities who are still drawn to each other. One of the final tracks completed on the album, Minneapolis musician Oliver Leiber developed the song quickly after being asked by Abdul's A&R representative Gemma Corfield to create new material. He constructed the track in less than an hour, using an Akai MPC drum machine for production. Fellow musician David Z suggested the song's potential as a duet. It was not originally intended to be a single, and Leiber later expressed disappointment with the final result.

As Forever Your Girl produced three number-one hits, Virgin Records grew concerned about potential overexposure and was initially hesitant to release another single before Abdul proposed a music video concept for "Opposites Attract" that helped secure the song's release. For the single version, the label requested a rap section. Leiber recruited DJ Derrick Stevens, whose lyrics were written by rapper and future actor Romany Malco. The music video was developed as a tribute to Gene Kelly and was inspired by the live-action and animation blending of Anchors Aweigh (1945), as well as characters from Hanna-Barbera's Top Cat. Animators Michael Patterson and Candace Reckinger created the character MC Skat Kat, an anthropomorphic rapping cat, while stand-in dancers Michael Chambers and Bill Bohls were used during filming as performance references. Production took two days, with multiple takes required for both animated and non-animated sequences.

The music video features Abdul and MC Skat Kat in a neon-lit, noir-inspired setting, depicting their contrasting personalities as they initially clash before reconciling through dance and romance. The single became a major commercial success, reaching number one on the Billboard Hot 100 for three weeks and making Abdul the fourth artist to achieve four number-one singles from one album. It also topped the Cash Box Top 100 for two weeks and charted strongly on R&B and dance charts, while reaching number one in Canada on multiple charts and topping charts in Australia and Luxembourg. The video received six nominations at the 1990 MTV Video Music Awards and won the Grammy Award for Best Music Video in 1991.

== Background ==
Before Paula Abdul's music career breakthrough, she was primarily known as a dancer and choreographer. She served as head choreographer for the Laker Girls, worked with the Jacksons on the "Torture" music video and their Victory Tour (1984), and conceptualized various music videos by Janet Jackson in the mid-1980s. Additionally, she choreographed the piano dance scene from the comedy film Big (1988), featuring Tom Hanks. On June 13, 1988, Abdul released her debut studio album, Forever Your Girl (1988). The album took 64 weeks to top the Billboard 200, considered the longest climb in the chart's history. Preceding "Opposites Attract", the album generated three Billboard Hot 100 number-one singles, "Straight Up", "Forever Your Girl" and "Cold Hearted", as well as the re-release of "The Way That You Love Me", which peaked at number three.

== Production and composition ==
=== Development and production ===
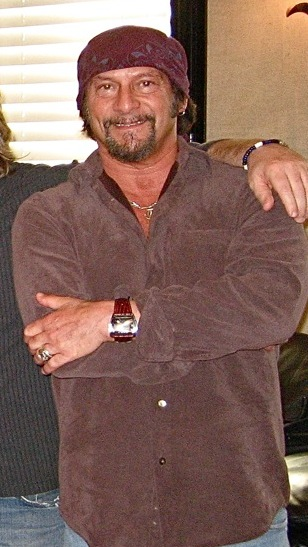
David Z recommended the idea of a duet for "Opposites Attract" to Oliver Leiber.

"Opposites Attract" was written and produced by Oliver Leiber, the son of pop songwriter Jerry Leiber and a figure in the Minneapolis sound scene. For Abdul's studio album Forever Your Girl (1988), Leiber wrote and produced "The Way That You Love Me" and the title track "Forever Your Girl", which later became a number-one hit. Around this time, Leiber purchased an Akai MPC drum machine and experimented with it until Abdul's A&R rep Gemma Corfield contacted him to request one additional track.

During the phone call, Leiber quickly developed the concept for "Opposites Attract" and played the beat over the phone. He reportedly took the song's title from a paperback book he found in a used bookstore. Although Abdul was primarily known as a choreographer and not a recording artist, Corfield urged Leiber to complete the song quickly. Leiber agreed and indicated he could finish it within a week. Initially, Leiber did not envision the song as a duet, until fellow Minneapolis musician David Z, known for producing the Fine Young Cannibals' "She Drives Me Crazy" (1988), suggested that the song would benefit from a vocal partner to emphasize its contrasting themes. Following this, Leiber wrote the lyrics in under an hour.

Leiber later recorded a demo of "Opposites Attract" with music duo the Wild Pair, consisting of Bruce DeShazer and Marv Gunn, who would provide MC Skat Kat's singing vocals in the music video. Around this time, the duo were members of band Mazarati, led by the Prince and the Revolution bassist Brownmark. The Wild Pair were recorded singing the entire song as Abdul was unavailable in Minneapolis to record. This led to Leiber traveling to Los Angeles to cut half of the Wild Pair's vocals and replace them with Abdul's vocals. The initial version from Forever Your Girl did not feature any rap vocals. The song was not initially intended as a single, and Leiber later admitted on Songfacts that he was "embarrassed" and "bummed" at how "Opposites Attract" turned out.

=== Single version and composition ===
By November 1989, Forever Your Girl had been certified quadruple platinum by the Recording Industry Association of America (RIAA), having produced multiple hit singles, including three that reached number one. Despite its commercial success, Virgin Records grew concerned about Abdul's increasing visibility and potential exposure. Abdul countered that concern by proposing a music video concept for "Opposites Attract", renewing the record label's interest and supporting its release as a single.

"Opposites Attract"
The lyrics of "Opposites Attract" emphasize the contrasts between Abdul and MC Skat Kat as both exchange lines throughout the song.

Virgin Records asked Leiber to produce a new version of "Opposites Attract" with a rapper featured on it. Desiring to improve the song's quality, he enlisted keyboardist Jeff Lorber to rework certain parts. However, Leiber didn't personally know any rappers. Instead, he recruited Minneapolis radio DJ Derrick "Delite" Stevens due to his interest in Stevens's voice, even before recognizing his ability to rap. Stevens recorded his vocals at Prince's Paisley Park studio weeks later. The rap lyrics were written by Romany Malco, who would later transition into a career as an actor.

Musically, "Opposites Attract" is a Minneapolis sound and R&B song with a runtime of four minutes and twenty-four seconds, while the single version trims approximately thirty-nine seconds of the song. Lyrically, the song centers on a couple whose personalities sharply contrast but remain romantically connected. Abdul prefers television, hates cigarettes and makes the bed, while the other prefers movies, smoking and "stealing the covers". Unlike the music video, the song doesn't explicitly identify her counterpart as MC Skat Kat.

== Release ==
On November 17, 1989, "Opposites Attract" was released on 7-inch vinyl, 12-inch vinyl, and cassette through Virgin Records, as the sixth and final single from Abdul's debut album, Forever Your Girl (1988). On January 21, 1990, the single was released on Mini CD in Japan. On February 19, the single was issued in Australia across three formats: 7-inch vinyl, 12-inch vinyl, and cassette, followed by a release on CD two weeks later on March 5. In the United Kingdom, the single was first released on March 26, and, on April 16, it was released on 7-inch vinyl with a poster inside, 12-inch vinyl featuring a gatefold, CD and cassette.

== Music video ==
=== Pre-production ===
Abdul proposed the idea of a "long-form video" for "Opposites Attract" to Virgin Records, though the label was initially hesitant due to concerns about potential overexposure following the success of Forever Your Girl (1988), as well as the idea of releasing a sixth single from the album. Abdul framed the concept as a tribute to actor and dancer Gene Kelly, which helped generate interest and support from the record label.

Virgin executive Jeff Ayeroff brought in animators Michael Patterson and Candace Reckinger, known for their work on music videos such as A-ha's "Take On Me" (1984) and Suzanne Vega's "Luka" (1987). The pair developed the character MC Skat Kat, an anthropomorphic cat designed in a stylized, "Disney-like" animated aesthetic that blended musical theater influences with hip-hop culture. The project emerged during a period of growing experimentation in combining live action and animation in mainstream media, following films such as Who Framed Roger Rabbit (1988) and the increasing popularity of anthropomorphic cats in works like Oliver & Company (1988) and Garfield and Friends.

Abdul's background in choreography and dance heavily influenced the video's concept, as did her admiration for Kelly. Patterson and Reckinger also drew inspiration from Kelly's legacy, particularly his earlier live-action/animation sequence in Anchors Aweigh (1945), in which he performs alongside Jerry Mouse from Tom and Jerry. The animators reinterpreted this idea through a contemporary lens, combining it with hip-hop aesthetics and the growing visibility of rappers such as MC Hammer.

=== Conception of MC Skat Kat ===
MC Skat Kat as depicted in the music video for "Opposites Attract"

Patterson drew inspiration for MC Skat Kat from the "cool, shifty felines" of Hanna-Barbera's 1960s animated series Top Cat. When asked about choosing a cat as the character's form, he simply stated that "cats are cool", citing their natural aloofness and the visual contrast alongside Abdul. During pre-production, Patterson and Candace Reckinger collaborated with animator Chris Bailey to refine MC Skat Kat's design, requesting additional hip-hop influences for the character. As hip-hop was an emerging scene at the time, they experimented with his design before making an "agreeable design". Once presented to Ayeroff, he suggested that the character resemble Patterson's street-influenced style, including "baggy pants held up with suspenders, worn over a tank top", a fade haircut and an earring, which helped finalize MC Skat Kat's design.

There is some dispute regarding the voice of MC Skat Kat. According to KMSP-TV, the character was voiced by Derrick "Delite" Stevens, a pioneer in Minneapolis' early hip-hop scene who performed under the name Derrick Delite and was among the first rappers to appear at the nightclub First Avenue. After Leiber heard Stevens on KMOJ radio, he recruited him to perform rap sections for "Opposites Attract". Stevens initially found the idea of voicing an animated cat surprising, later describing the experience as "ancient history" that he remembers fondly. However, Yahoo News attributed MC Skat Kat's voice to Malco, who at the time was pursuing a recording career with Virgin Records and working as a writer for other artists. Abdul reportedly approached Malco to contribute writing for the character, though he was initially hesitant, concerned it might affect his reputation within the hip-hop group R.M.G. Despite that, Malco's involvement in the production helped him transition into film and television, first being linked to comedian and actor John Leguizamo, who had the idea of rapping like MC Skat Kat in his film The Pest (1997).

=== Production ===
Each sequence was shot multiple times while filming the music video for "Opposites Attract", as the left half shows screenshots from the video, while the other side is a photograph of Abdul dancing with stand-in dancer Bill Bohls.

During the music video's production, Patterson and Reckinger hired stand-in dancer Michael Chambers for the music video's live-action footage to use as reference for MC Skat Kat's animated scenes. Around this time, Chambers had been known for his breakdancing career, being featured in films such as Breakin' 2: Electric Boogaloo (1984). He took an interest in his role for the production, considering that the character's animation was about silhouettes and that striking poses were the essence in that medium. In addition to pre-choreographed dance moves, Chambers provided "walks, attitude, positions, and reactions" that added to MC Skat Kat's "vibrant, sassy personality".

The live-action scenes of the music video took two days, which was described by Chambers and Abdul as physically demanding. The first day lasted 15 hours, while the second day extended to 24 hours. The extended schedule was largely due to each sequence being shot multiple times from both dancers side by side to just Abdul. This allowed animators to leave room for MC Skat Kat. Other than Chambers, Bill Bohls was hired as an additional dancer.

A slippery hazard was prevalent during the music video's production, especially considering the risk when Abdul wanted to perform a tap-dance sequence in heels. In order to prevent her from slipping and injuring herself, a gaffer used what he called "an old gaffer's trick", which consisted of Coca-Cola being spilled all over the floor, then dried with a hair dryer, giving it a tacky surface that allowed Abdul to finish the sequence in one take. On the animation side of production, painted cels were used and rough sketches were cleaned up with the help of United Productions of America (UPA) animator Bill Melendez and his team.

=== Plot ===
Running approximately three and a half minutes, the music video for "Opposites Attract" presents a stylized romance between Paula Abdul, a human character, and MC Skat Kat, an anthropomorphic animated cat. Their relationship plays on a familiar live-action/animation pairing trope seen in films such as Who Framed Roger Rabbit (1988) and Howard the Duck (1986). Set in a "noirish, neon set", the video begins with the pair meeting and immediately contrasting with each other. MC Skat Kat taps Abdul on the shoulder, which comically ignites into animated flames, prompting her to walk away in frustration and slam a door. The tone quickly shifts as they reunite in silhouette atop an alley wall, performing synchronized choreography in which Abdul tugs MC Skat Kat's tail and spins him into a cartoon blur.

Throughout the video, the narrative uses direct-to-camera exchanges as the pair deliver lines from the song, emphasizing their contrasting personalities: "Who'd have thought we could be lovers? / She makes the bed, and he steals the covers." As the relationship develops, MC Skat Kat lounges in Abdul's lap on a loveseat, exhaling cigarette smoke after she expresses dislike for smoking, underscoring their opposing habits. The interaction escalates as he flips onto Abdul, briefly pinning her wrists before Abdul sits up and grabs him by the neck. The next sequence transitions into an animated staircase setting, where the pair perform a coordinated two-step dance.

== Commercial performance ==
With "Opposites Attract", Abdul became the fourth music artist to have four number-one hits from a single album on the Billboard Hot 100.

"Opposites Attract" debuted on the week of December 16, 1989, and landed at number one on the week of February 10, 1990, where it remained for three weeks, matching the run of Abdul's previous hit, "Straight Up" (1988). It became Abdul's fourth number-one single on the US Billboard Hot 100. In doing so, it made Abdul the fourth artist to achieve four number-one singles from a single album, following Whitney Houston, George Michael and Michael Jackson, and achieved six singles in the top five or top ten. With the success of the single and its music video, Forever Your Girl topped the Billboard 200 for nine consecutive weeks, selling eight million units. The music video's success led to Abdul, Patterson and Reckinger receiving six nominations at the 1990 MTV Video Music Awards, and won a Grammy Award for Best Music Video at the 33rd Annual Grammy Awards in 1991.

Involving MC Skat Kat, "Opposites Attract" is estimated to be the third number-one Hot 100 hit to feature a fictional music artist, following The Chipmunks' "The Chipmunk Song (Christmas Don't Be Late)" (1958) and The Archies' "Sugar, Sugar" (1969). Additionally, the single is considered the first number-one hit to feature a rap verse since Blondie's "Rapture" (1981), since at the time, rappers such as Tone Loc and Young MC had major hits in 1989 but had yet to achieve the top. The first exclusively hip-hop single to top the Hot 100 was later achieved when Vanilla Ice's "Ice, Ice Baby" (1990) peaked at number one on the week of November 3, 1990.

In addition to the Billboard Hot 100, "Opposites Attract" peaked at number three on Hot R&B Singles, number seven on Dance Singles Sales, number 24 on Dance Club Songs, and number 45 on the Hot Adult Contemporary charts. With competitor Cash Box, the song topped the Top 100 Pop Singles chart for two weeks and also peaked at number two on Dance Singles and number three on R&B Singles charts. In Canada, the song topped their Top Singles, Retail Singles, Contemporary Hit Radio, and Dance/Urban charts. Additionally, it peaked at number two on the more independent Quebec chart from ADISQ. Internationally, "Opposites Attract" topped charts in Australia and Luxembourg, peaked at the top five in Belgium, Europe, the Netherlands and the UK, and the top ten in Finland, Ireland, New Zealand and Norway. Outside of the top ten, the song charted in Austria, France, Sweden, Switzerland and West Germany.

"Opposites Attract" appeared in multiple year-end charts, ranking at number 14 on the US Billboard Hot 100, number 19 on the Cash Box Top 100 and number 40 on the former's Hot R&B Singles chart. The song found its biggest success in Australia, where it ranked number six. In Canada, the song charted at number 13 and number 22 on Top Singles and Dance/Urban charts, respectively. Additionally, the single appeared on year-end charts from Belgium, Europe, Germany, the Netherlands, New Zealand, Sweden and the UK. In Canada's decade-end chart of the 1990s, it was ranked number 30. In 1998, during Virgin Records' 25th anniversary page on Billboard, "Opposites Attract" was estimated as the label's 22nd biggest single.

In terms of record sales, "Opposites Attract" was certified gold by the Recording Industry Association of America (RIAA) on March 12, 1990, having sold over 500,000 units. In April 1990, the British Phonographic Industry (BPI) and Music Canada certified the single as Silver, for surpassing 200,000 units, and Gold, for surpassing 50,000 units, respectively. Additionally, the Australian Recording Industry Association (ARIA) certified it as Platinum for selling over 70,000 units.

== Critical reception ==
Melody Maker praised the song's upbeat energy, noting Abdul's confident delivery and the addition of a rap intro, describing her performance as "happy, naive and full of herself". The pan-European magazine Music & Media commented on the collaborative aspect of the single, noting Abdul's duet with the Wild Pair and the inclusion of Delite's rap section as having dance appeal. Similarly, People magazine identified "Opposites Attract" as one of "the liveliest cuts" on Forever Your Girl. In retrospective analysis, Tom Breihan of Stereogum gave the song a 6/10 rating. While he criticized MC Skat Kat's rap performance and described him as a "horny rapping novelty-song cartoon cat", he complimented the song's production. AllMusic rated "Opposites Attract" two out of five stars as a single without a review.

== Legacy ==
=== Friendship with Gene Kelly ===
After the music video for "Opposites Attract" was completed, Abdul received an invitation to meet Kelly at his Beverly Hills home to play it for him. Abdul described herself as a "nervous wreck" circling the block for 45 minutes due to her excitement about meeting him and having arrived at the appointment too early. Once the two met, Abdul and Kelly became friends, a relationship that lasted until the latter's death in 1996. Following "Opposites Attract", in 1991, Kelly arranged for Abdul to be in a Diet Coke commercial that digitized the former's footage from Anchors Aweigh (1945), with the latter replacing the film's co-lead Frank Sinatra.

=== MC Skat Kat's initial run ===
Following the success of "Opposites Attract", Virgin Records attempted to develop MC Skat Kat into a marketable character, moving him away from his duo act with Abdul to expand his fictional universe with additional anthropomorphic cat characters, including Fatz, Taboo, Micetro, Leo, Katleen and Silk. In 1991, the record label released his only studio album, The Adventures of MC Skat Kat and the Stray Mob. Patterson and Reckinger returned to direct the music video for "Skat Strut", which included a cameo by Abdul. Although the video received heavy rotation on MTV, the single achieved limited commercial success, peaking at number 80 on the Billboard Hot 100. Another music video was made for the album's track "Big Time", but was ultimately never released. That year, he appeared in "Yakety Yak, Take It Back", a PSA recycling music video set to a more contemporary version of The Coasters' "Yakety Yak" (1958). The video also featured appearances from various music artists from Stevie Wonder to Tone Loc.

Further attempts to expand MC Skat Kat's presence were unsuccessful. MTV reportedly considered adopting him as their official mascot and nearly commissioned an animated series but neither materialized, as the series' pitch lost to the much more successful Beavis and Butt-Head. Universal Pictures also took interest in a live-action/animation crossover film but never progressed to production. Merchandise concepts, including MC Skat Kat dolls designed by Patterson and Reckinger, were developed but never published. Following the conclusion of the character's initial run, the duo went on to direct music videos for other music artists, including Sting, Electric Light Orchestra and Donald Fagan.

=== Pop culture references ===
In 1997, Abdul performed "Opposites Attract" on Muppets Tonight with "different indeterminate-species Muppet monsters" replacing MC Skat Kat. The music video for the song was later parodied in "The Father, the Son, and the Holy Fonz", a 2005 season four episode of Family Guy, in which Peter Griffin (Seth MacFarlane) appears dressed as MC Skat Kat and performs a humorous rendition of the song, repeatedly emphasizing the line "I'm dressed like a cat". On July 22, 2015, Abdul revisited the song with English comedian James Corden on The Late Late Show with James Corden as a lip-sync segment, with the latter portraying MC Skat Kat.

In 2016, MC Skat Kat, voiced by Stevens, appeared in a parody segment on the season 13 American Dad! episode "Kiss Kiss Cam Cam" in which the character applies for a janitorial job. The character subsequently resurfaced in later pop culture appearances, including performances alongside Abdul on Dancing with the Stars and during her 2017 concert tour. In 2019, MC Skat Kat made a guest appearance during Abdul's medley at the 2019 Billboard Music Awards. The pair later appeared in a brief cameo in Chip 'n Dale: Rescue Rangers (2022).

== Track listings and formats ==
- 7-inch and cassette single
1. "Opposites Attract" (7-inch) – 3:45
2. "One or the Other" (LP Version) – 4:08
- US 12-inch single
1. "Opposites Attract" (Street Mix) – 4:28
2. "Opposites Attract" (12-inch Mix) – 5:40
3. "Opposites Attract" (Dub Version) – 6:25
4. "Opposites Attract" (Magnetic Mix) – 4:01
5. "Opposites Attract" (Club Mix) – 6:01
6. "Opposites Attract" (Party Dub) – 3:09
- US promotional CD single
1. "Opposites Attract" (Derrick Rap Edit) – 3:45
2. "Opposites Attract" (Radio Edit) – 3:38
- Japanese Mini CD single
1. "Opposites Attract" – 3:46
2. "(It's Just) The Way That You Love Me" – 4:03
- UK CD single
1. "Opposites Attract" (Street Mix) – 4:28
2. "One or the Other" (LP Version) – 4:08
3. "Opposites Attract" (Club Mix) – 6:01
4. "Opposites Attract" (Party Dub) – 3:09
- UK 12-inch single
1. "Opposites Attract" (Street Mix) – 4:28
2. "Opposites Attract" (Party Dub) – 3:10
3. "The Paula Abdul Megamix" ("Straight Up"/"Cold Hearted"/"The Way That You Love Me"/"Forever Your Girl"/"Knocked Out")

== Credits and personnel ==
Credits and personnel are adapted from Forever Your Girl and the single's liner notes.

Locations

- Recorded at Creation Audio, Minneapolis, Minnesota
- Recorded at Kren Studio, Hollywood, California
- Recorded at JHL Studio, Palisades, California
- Mixed at Skip Saylor Studio, Los Angeles, California

Musicians

- Paula Abdul – lead vocals, background vocals
- The Wild Pair (Bruce DeShazer and Marv Gunn) – lead vocals
- Oliver Leiber – writer, producer, drum programming, keyboard, guitar
- Derrick Delite – rap vocals
- Yvette Marine – background vocals
- Patti Brooks – background vocals

Technical

- Chris Bailey – character design
- Russell Bracher – engineering
- Keith "K.C." Cohen – mixing
- Larry Frazin – platinum management
- Cliff Jones – engineering
- Jeff Lorber – engineering, additional drum programming
- Pete Martinsen – engineering
- Michael Patterson – character design
- Sarajo Frieden Studio – design, illustration
- Larry Tollin – platinum management

== Charts ==
=== Weekly charts ===
Chart (1989–1990)	Peak position
Australia (ARIA)	1
Austria (Ö3 Austria Top 40)	18
Belgium (Ultratop 50 Flanders)	4
Canada Retail Singles (The Record)	1
Canada Contemporary Hit Radio (The Record)	1
Canada Top Singles (RPM)	1
Canada Dance/Urban (RPM)	1
Europe (Eurochart Hot 100)	5
Finland (Suomen virallinen lista)	6
France (SNEP)	23
Ireland (IRMA)	8
Luxembourg (Radio Luxembourg)	1
Netherlands (Dutch Top 40)	4
New Zealand (Recorded Music NZ)	6
Norway (VG-lista)	6
Quebec (ADISQ)	2
Sweden (Sverigetopplistan)	11
Switzerland (Schweizer Hitparade)	19
UK Singles (Official Charts)	2
US Billboard Hot 100	1
US Adult Contemporary (Billboard)	45
US Dance Club Songs (Billboard)	24
US Dance Singles Sales (Billboard)	7
US Hot R&B/Hip-Hop Songs (Billboard)	3
US Cash Box Top 100	1
US Cash Box Dance Singles	3
US Cash Box R&B Singles	2
West Germany (GfK)	14

=== Year-end charts ===
Chart (1990)	Position
Australia (ARIA)	6
Belgium (Ultratop)	29
Canada Top Singles (RPM)	13
Canada Dance/Urban (RPM)	22
Europe (Eurochart Hot 100)	29
Germany (Media Control)	83
Netherlands (Dutch Top 40)	44
New Zealand (RIANZ)	40
Sweden (Topplistan)	41
UK Singles (OCC)	25
US Billboard Hot 100	14
US Hot R&B Singles (Billboard)	40
US Cash Box Top 100	19

=== Decade-end charts ===
Chart (1990–1999)	Position
Canada (Nielsen SoundScan)	30

== Certifications and sales ==
Region	Certification	Certified units/sales
Australia (ARIA)	Platinum	70,000^{^}
Canada (Music Canada)	Gold	50,000^{^}
United Kingdom (BPI)	Silver	200,000^{^}
United States (RIAA)	Gold	500,000^{^}
^{^} Shipments figures based on certification alone.

== Release history ==
Region	Date	Format(s)	Label(s)	Ref.
United States	November 17, 1989	7-inch vinyl; 12-inch vinyl; cassette	Virgin	
Japan	January 21, 1990	Mini-CD	Virgin	
Australia	February 19, 1990	7-inch vinyl; 12-inch vinyl; cassette	Virgin	
Australia	March 5, 1990	CD	Virgin	
United Kingdom	March 26, 1990	7-inch vinyl; 12-inch vinyl	Siren	
United Kingdom	April 16, 1990	7-inch vinyl with poster; 12-inch gatefold vinyl; CD; cassette	Siren	
