= Mazarati =

American band

- Mazarati in 1986

Background information
- Origin: Minneapolis, Minnesota, United States
- Genres: R&B; funk; soul; new wave; pop; rock; Minneapolis sound
- Years active: 1986–1989
- Labels: Paisley Park/Warner Bros.; Motown
- Past members: Lenny Holmes; Sir Casey Terry; Jerome "Romeo" Cox; Craig "Screamer" Powell; Kevin Patricks; Tony Christian (born Bruce DeShazer); Marr Starr; Aaron Paul Keith

Mazarati was an American R&B, rock and funk band, formed in the mid-1980s and was active until 1989. The band had seven members and was produced by the former Prince and The Revolution bassist Brownmark. Originally hailing from Minneapolis, they became defunct as a group in 1989. The band's sole hit was a song called "100 MPH", which was written and co-produced by Prince.

== Career ==
=== 1986: Mazarati and Paisley Park ===
The band is notable for some of the songs that they did not release. They were originally given the song "Kiss" by Prince in demo form, with melody, lyrics and basic song structure. David Z worked on the song, "starting with a LinnDrum, I programmed the beat and began experimenting. Taking a hi-hat from the drum machine, I ran it through a delay unit and switched between input and output and in the middle. That created a very funky rhythm. Then I took an acoustic guitar, played these open chords and gated that to the hi-hat trigger. The result was a really unique rhythm that was unbelievably funky but also impossible to actually play... The background vocals I adapted from the Brenda Lee song 'Sweet Nothings' " The end result was, "a so-so dance number. "The guitar was dry and gated, and everything else sounded kind of different to the corporate rock that was on the radio at that time." Mazarati's backing vocals were retained on the final song which was released on Parade (1986). The song became a No. 1 hit single and Grammy Award winner. Another song given to Mazarati was an out-take from The Time called "Jerk Out". Their take on the song never made the album, but the track was redone in 1990, once again with The Time who scored their biggest hit with the track, which reached number nine on the Billboard Hot 100. Mazarati's backing vocals were also kept on the released version. Mazarati are name checked on the Prince penned Sheila E. track "Holly Rock".

On July 1, 1986, the group performed "Players' Ball", "I Guess It's All Over", and "100 MPH" live at the premiere party of the movie Under the Cherry Moon, held at the Centennial Theater in Sheridan, Wyoming as part of an MTV contest. A few other live concerts took place that year.

=== 1989: Mazarati 2, Motown Records and split ===
The band continued after its association with Prince and signed with Motown Records releasing their second album, Mazarati 2 (1989), including the singles "The Saga of a Man" and "The Woman Thang". This project reflects the music of that era which was directing to the new jack swing-genre. Brown Mark and former Klymaxx-founding member Bernadette Cooper both worked as producers on this album. The project experienced little success, and since the distribution of the LP and CD seems to be limited in quantity and exclusively released as a promo in Canada (before it was withdrawn), these original copies are in demand by collectors.

Members Marvin Gunn and Tony Christian, also known as Bruce DeShazer, formed the musical duo The Wild Pair and recorded a 1989 song with Paula Abdul, "Opposites Attract", for which they voiced the animated MC Skat Kat in the video.

The Prince Family Reunion at the Cabooze was the venue where they reunited and performed again. The tickets were being sold for $2 and they dedicated Christian's house for rehearsals of their live performances.

The Mazarati albums have yet to be reissued due to the collapse of the label and of its joint venture with Warner Bros. Records. In 1990 the first album appeared on CD in Japan through WEA International.

== Discography ==
=== Albums ===
- Mazarati (1986), Paisley Park/Warner Bros. Records
- Mazarati 2 (1989), Motown (Canadian release only)

=== Singles ===
- "Players' Ball" / "I Guess It's All Over" (1986), Paisley Park
- "100 MPH" / "Don't Leave Me Baby" (1986) No. 19 U.S. R&B, Paisley Park/Warner Bros.
- "Stroke" / "Champagne Saturday" (1986), Paisley Park/Warner Bros.
- "The Saga of a Man" (1989), Motown
- "The Woman Thang" (1989), Motown
