= List of Retail Singles number ones =

Canada's premier single sales chart (1983–1996)

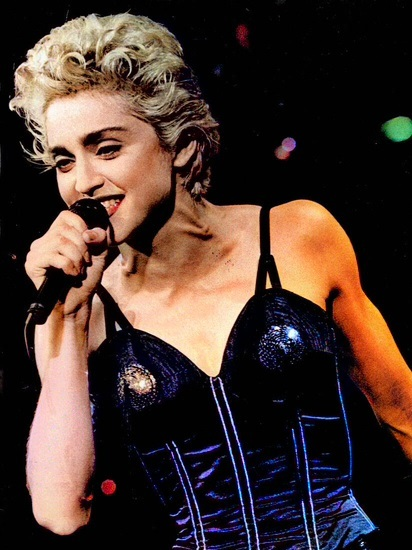
Madonna achieved 12 number ones on the Retail Singles chart, the most for any artist

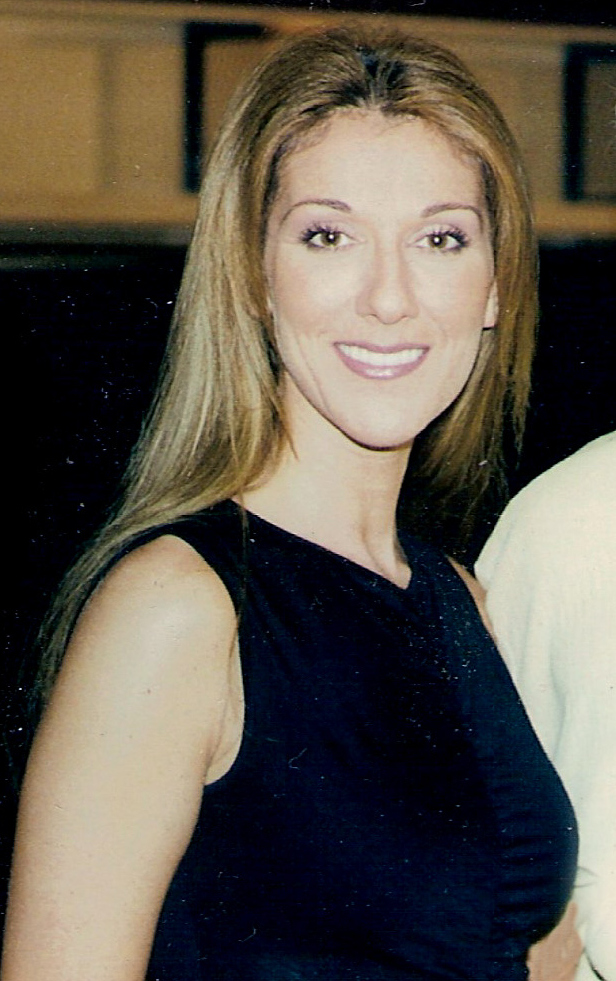
Celine Dion's "The Power of Love" is the best-performing song in Retail Singles history

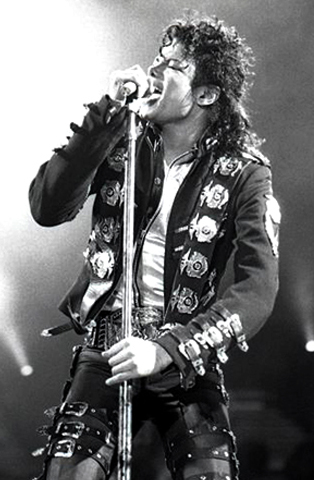
Michael Jackson was the first and only artist to replace themselves at number one

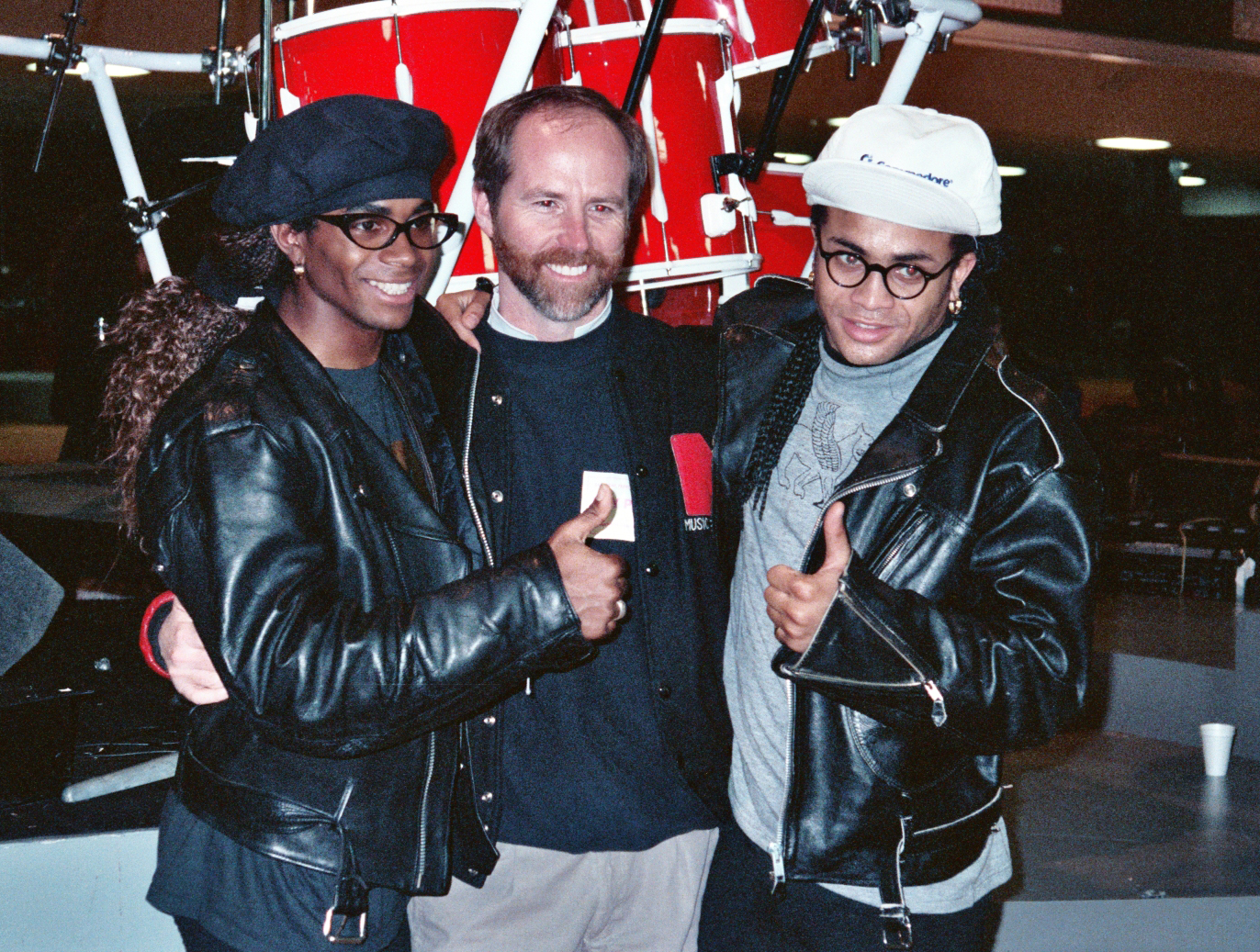
Four Milli Vanilli singles reached number one in 1989, the most of any artist in a calendar year

Retail Singles was a weekly music chart compiled and published by Canadian magazine The Record from 1983 to 1996 that ranked the best-selling songs in Canada. Whereas the singles chart of rival magazine RPM was based solely on radio airplay after September 1988, Retail Singles was based on a national sample of single sales reports given by Canadian retailers and rack jobbers. It was regarded in the music industry as the premier Canadian single sales chart for the duration of its publication. (Note: A retail singles chart was also published by RPM from 1988 to 1990.) The chart was associated with Canada in the Hits of the World section of American magazine Billboard and was featured in Canadian newspapers such as the Montreal Gazette, Winnipeg Sun, and Edmonton Journal.

Retail Singles was first published in the January 10, 1983, issue of The Record, and was dated seven days later. The chart contained thirty positions through the week ending October 24, 1983. It expanded to forty positions on the week ending October 31, 1983, and to fifty positions on the week ending February 11, 1985. From the week ending January 22, 1990, until its discontinuation after the week ending April 1, 1996, Retail Singles contained forty positions. After thirteen years, 2,500 entries, and 193 number ones, The Record ceased publishing the chart due to a lack of sales reports owing to declining single sales in the country. It was succeeded in October 1996 by the Canadian Singles Chart, compiled by SoundScan.

American singer Madonna achieved the most Retail Singles number ones (12), followed by Phil Collins (6), Paula Abdul (5), Michael Jackson (5), and Mariah Carey (5). Five songs tied for the most weeks at number one, with 12: "Faith" by George Michael (1987–1988), "(Everything I Do) I Do It for You" by Bryan Adams (1991), "Said I Loved You...But I Lied" by Michael Bolton (1993–1994), "The Power of Love" by Celine Dion (1994), and "Fantasy" by Carey (1995–1996). Stevie Wonder's "I Just Called to Say I Love You" is the best-performing song of the 1980s and Dion's "The Power of Love" is the best-performing title in Retail Singles history.

== Chart history ==
Key
†	Indicates a song debuted at number one
re	Indicates a song returned to number one
(Canada)	Indicates a song designated as Canadian content by the Canadian Radio-television and Telecommunications Commission

List of number ones
No.	Chart date	Song	Artist(s)	Weeks at number one (Note: In occasional weeks when The Record was not published, the song at number one in the last published week is inferred as remaining at number one.)
1	January 17, 1983	"Dirty Laundry"	Don Henley	1
2	January 24, 1983	"Mickey"	Toni Basil	5
3	February 28, 1983	"Pass the Dutchie"	Musical Youth	1
4	March 7, 1983	"Do You Really Want to Hurt Me"	Culture Club	3
5	March 28, 1983	"Billie Jean"	Michael Jackson	7
6	May 16, 1983	"Beat It"	Michael Jackson	2
7	May 30, 1983	"Flashdance... What a Feeling"	Irene Cara	6
8	July 11, 1983	"Electric Avenue"	Eddy Grant	5
9	August 15, 1983	"Every Breath You Take"	The Police	5
10	September 19, 1983	"Maniac"	Michael Sembello	2
11	October 3, 1983	"Sweet Dreams (Are Made of This)"	Eurythmics	1
re	October 10, 1983	"Maniac"	Michael Sembello	1
re	October 17, 1983	"Sweet Dreams (Are Made of This)"	Eurythmics	2
12	October 31, 1983	"True"	Spandau Ballet	2
13	November 14, 1983	"Islands in the Stream"	Kenny Rogers and Dolly Parton	9
14	January 16, 1984	"Say Say Say"	Paul McCartney and Michael Jackson	1
15	January 23, 1984	"Major Tom (Coming Home)"	Peter Schilling	1
16	January 30, 1984	"Karma Chameleon"	Culture Club	7
17	March 19, 1984	"99 Luftballons"	Nena	2
18	April 2, 1984	"Girls Just Wanna Have Fun"	Cyndi Lauper	6
19	May 14, 1984	"Against All Odds (Take a Look at Me Now)"	Phil Collins	3
20	June 4, 1984	"To All the Girls I've Loved Before"	Julio Iglesias and Willie Nelson	3
21	June 25, 1984	"Time After Time"	Cyndi Lauper	3
22	July 16, 1984	"Let's Hear It for the Boy"	Deniece Williams	1
23	July 23, 1984	"Self Control"	Laura Branigan	3
24	August 13, 1984	"When Doves Cry"	Prince	2
25	August 27, 1984	"Ghostbusters"	Ray Parker Jr.	5
26	October 1, 1984	"What's Love Got to Do with It"	Tina Turner	1
27	October 8, 1984	"Missing You"	John Waite	3
28	October 29, 1984	"I Just Called to Say I Love You"	Stevie Wonder	11
29	January 14, 1985	"Do They Know It's Christmas?"	Band Aid	1†
30	January 21, 1985	"Like a Virgin"	Madonna	3
31	February 11, 1985	"Easy Lover"	Philip Bailey and Phil Collins	6
32	March 25, 1985	"I Want to Know What Love Is"	Foreigner	2
33	April 8, 1985	"Shout"	Tears for Fears	2
34	April 22, 1985	"One Night in Bangkok"	Murray Head	1
35	April 29, 1985	"Tears Are Not Enough" (Canada)	Northern Lights	2
re	May 13, 1985	"Shout"	Tears for Fears	2
re	May 27, 1985	"Tears Are Not Enough" (Canada)	Northern Lights	2
36	June 10, 1985	"Everybody Wants to Rule the World"	Tears for Fears	2
37	June 24, 1985	"Sussudio"	Phil Collins	2
38	July 8, 1985	"Never Surrender" (Canada)	Corey Hart	7
39	August 26, 1985	"Everytime You Go Away"	Paul Young	1
re	September 2, 1985	"Never Surrender" (Canada)	Corey Hart	2
40	September 16, 1985	"We Don't Need Another Hero"	Tina Turner	4
41	October 14, 1985	"Part-Time Lover"	Stevie Wonder	3
42	November 4, 1985	"Money for Nothing"	Dire Straits	2
re	November 18, 1985	"Part-Time Lover"	Stevie Wonder	4
43	December 16, 1985	"Separate Lives"	Phil Collins and Marilyn Martin	1
44	December 23, 1985	"Live Is Life"	Opus	7
45	February 10, 1986	"Say You, Say Me"	Lionel Richie	2
46	February 24, 1986	"That's What Friends Are For"	Dionne & Friends	3
47	March 17, 1986	"Conga"	Miami Sound Machine	2
48	March 31, 1986	"How Will I Know"	Whitney Houston	2
49	April 14, 1986	"Nikita"	Elton John	4
50	May 12, 1986	"Don't Forget Me (When I'm Gone)" (Canada)	Glass Tiger	2
51	May 26, 1986	"Let's Go All the Way"	Sly Fox	1
52	June 2, 1986	"West End Girls"	Pet Shop Boys	2
53	June 16, 1986	"Live to Tell"	Madonna	5
54	July 21, 1986	"Sledgehammer"	Peter Gabriel	4
55	August 18, 1986	"Papa Don't Preach"	Madonna	6
56	September 29, 1986	"Glory of Love"	Peter Cetera	1
57	October 6, 1986	"Venus"	Bananarama	2
58	October 20, 1986	"Take My Breath Away"	Berlin	3
59	November 10, 1986	"Spirit in the Sky"	Doctor and the Medics	2
60	November 24, 1986	"True Colors"	Cyndi Lauper	1
61	December 1, 1986	"Amanda"	Boston	1
62	December 8, 1986	"The Lady in Red"	Chris de Burgh	8
63	February 2, 1987	"Everybody Have Fun Tonight"	Wang Chung	1
64	February 9, 1987	"Walk Like an Egyptian"	The Bangles	3
65	March 2, 1987	"Touch Me (I Want Your Body)"	Samantha Fox	7
66	April 20, 1987	"The Final Countdown"	Europe	1
67	April 27, 1987	"Nothing's Gonna Stop Us Now"	Starship	3
68	May 18, 1987	"Lean on Me"	Club Nouveau	3
69	June 8, 1987	"(I Just) Died in Your Arms"	Cutting Crew	1
70	June 15, 1987	"La Isla Bonita"	Madonna	1
re	June 22, 1987	"(I Just) Died in Your Arms"	Cutting Crew	1
71	June 29, 1987	"I Wanna Dance with Somebody (Who Loves Me)"	Whitney Houston	2
72	July 13, 1987	"You Keep Me Hangin' On"	Kim Wilde	2
re	July 27, 1987	"I Wanna Dance with Somebody (Who Loves Me)"	Whitney Houston	4
73	August 24, 1987	"Alone"	Heart	2
74	September 7, 1987	"Who's That Girl"	Madonna	2
75	September 21, 1987	"La Bamba"	Los Lobos	7
76	November 9, 1987	"Bad"	Michael Jackson	1
77	November 16, 1987	"Paper in Fire"	John Cougar Mellencamp	1
78	November 23, 1987	"Mony Mony"	Billy Idol	1
79	November 30, 1987	"Faith"	George Michael	12
80	February 22, 1988	"Pop Goes the World" (Canada)	Men Without Hats	1
81	February 29, 1988	"Pump Up the Volume"	MARRS	3
82	March 21, 1988	"Never Gonna Give You Up"	Rick Astley	3
re	April 11, 1988	"Pump Up the Volume"	MARRS	1
re	April 18, 1988	"Never Gonna Give You Up"	Rick Astley	1
83	April 25, 1988	"Get Outta My Dreams, Get into My Car"	Billy Ocean	5
84	May 30, 1988	"Always on My Mind"	Pet Shop Boys	4
85	June 27, 1988	"Beds Are Burning"	Midnight Oil	2
86	July 11, 1988	"Together Forever"	Rick Astley	3
87	August 1, 1988	"Foolish Beat"	Debbie Gibson	1
88	August 8, 1988	"Roll with It"	Steve Winwood	3
89	August 29, 1988	"I Don't Wanna Go On with You Like That"	Elton John	3
90	September 19, 1988	"Simply Irresistible"	Robert Palmer	3
91	October 10, 1988	"Better Be Home Soon"	Crowded House	2
92	October 24, 1988	"Don't Worry, Be Happy"	Bobby McFerrin	2
93	November 21, 1988	"A Groovy Kind of Love"	Phil Collins	5
94	December 26, 1988	"The Loco-Motion"	Kylie Minogue	4
95	January 23, 1989	"Baby, I Love Your Way/Freebird Medley"	Will to Power	2
96	February 6, 1989	"Waiting for a Star to Fall"	Boy Meets Girl	1
97	February 13, 1989	"Two Hearts"	Phil Collins	2
98	February 27, 1989	"She Wants to Dance with Me"	Rick Astley	3
99	March 20, 1989	"You Got It"	Roy Orbison	1
100	March 27, 1989	"Straight Up"	Paula Abdul	5
101	May 1, 1989	"She Drives Me Crazy"	Fine Young Cannibals	2
102	May 15, 1989	"Like a Prayer"	Madonna	1
103	May 22, 1989	"Girl You Know It's True"	Milli Vanilli	1
re	May 29, 1989	"Like a Prayer"	Madonna	2
104	June 12, 1989	"The Look"	Roxette	1
105	June 19, 1989	"Forever Your Girl"	Paula Abdul	3
106	July 10, 1989	"Buffalo Stance"	Neneh Cherry	5
107	August 14, 1989	"Baby Don't Forget My Number"	Milli Vanilli	1
108	August 21, 1989	"Batdance"	Prince	2
109	September 4, 1989	"On Our Own"	Bobby Brown	4
110	October 2, 1989	"Right Here Waiting"	Richard Marx	2
111	October 16, 1989	"Cold Hearted"	Paula Abdul	2
112	October 30, 1989	"Miss You Much"	Janet Jackson	1
113	November 6, 1989	"Girl I'm Gonna Miss You"	Milli Vanilli	1
re	November 13, 1989	"Miss You Much"	Janet Jackson	1
114	November 20, 1989	"Listen to Your Heart"	Roxette	2
115	December 4, 1989	"Bust a Move"	Young MC	1
116	December 11, 1989	"Blame It on the Rain"	Milli Vanilli	2
117	December 25, 1989	"Swing the Mood"	Jive Bunny and the Mastermixers	4
re	January 22, 1990	"Blame It on the Rain"	Milli Vanilli	2
118	February 5, 1990	"Back to Life (However Do You Want Me)"	Soul II Soul	3
119	February 26, 1990	"Opposites Attract"	Paula Abdul	6
120	April 9, 1990	"Let Your Backbone Slide" (Canada)	Maestro Fresh-Wes	1
121	April 16, 1990	"All Around the World"	Lisa Stansfield	5
122	May 21, 1990	"Vogue"	Madonna	3
123	June 11, 1990	"All I Wanna Do Is Make Love to You"	Heart	2
124	June 25, 1990	"Step by Step"	New Kids on the Block	1
125	July 2, 1990	"U Can't Touch This"	MC Hammer	3
re	July 23, 1990	"Step by Step"	New Kids on the Block	3
126	August 13, 1990	"Bird on a Wire" (Canada)	The Neville Brothers	2
127	August 27, 1990	"Unskinny Bop"	Poison	1
128	September 3, 1990	"Vision of Love"	Mariah Carey	1
129	September 10, 1990	"Release Me"	Wilson Phillips	2
re	September 24, 1990	"Unskinny Bop"	Poison	1
re	October 1, 1990	"Vision of Love"	Mariah Carey	1
re	October 8, 1990	"Unskinny Bop"	Poison	1
re	October 15, 1990	"Release Me"	Wilson Phillips	3
130	November 5, 1990	"Suicide Blonde"	INXS	2
131	November 19, 1990	"Praying for Time"	George Michael	1
132	November 26, 1990	"Something to Believe In"	Poison	2
133	December 10, 1990	"Stranded"	Heart	1
134	December 17, 1990	"Love Takes Time"	Mariah Carey	1
135	December 24, 1990	"Wiggle It"	2 in a Room	6
136	February 4, 1991	"Gonna Make You Sweat (Everybody Dance Now)"	C+C Music Factory	6
137	March 18, 1991	"Sadeness (Part I)"	Enigma	3
138	April 8, 1991	"I've Been Thinking About You"	Londonbeat	4
139	May 6, 1991	"Joyride"	Roxette	5
140	June 10, 1991	"More Than Words"	Extreme	2
141	June 24, 1991	"Not Like Kissing You" (Canada)	West End Girls	1
142	July 1, 1991	"Rush Rush"	Paula Abdul	4
143	July 29, 1991	"(Everything I Do) I Do It for You"	Bryan Adams	12
144	October 21, 1991	"Enter Sandman"	Metallica	2
145	November 4, 1991	"Life Is a Highway" (Canada)	Tom Cochrane	6
146	December 16, 1991	"Black or White"	Michael Jackson	8
147	February 10, 1992	"Finally"	CeCe Peniston	2
148	February 24, 1992	"I'm Too Sexy"	Right Said Fred	3
149	March 16, 1992	"Don't Let the Sun Go Down on Me"	George Michael and Elton John	1
150	March 23, 1992	"Justified & Ancient"	The KLF featuring Tammy Wynette	6
151	May 4, 1992	"Save the Best for Last"	Vanessa Williams	2
152	May 18, 1992	"Tears in Heaven"	Eric Clapton	1
153	May 25, 1992	"Jump"	Kris Kross	6
154	July 6, 1992	"I'll Be There"	Mariah Carey	2
155	July 20, 1992	"Achy Breaky Heart"	Billy Ray Cyrus	4
156	August 17, 1992	"This Used to Be My Playground"	Madonna	6
157	September 28, 1992	"Humpin' Around"	Bobby Brown	2
158	October 12, 1992	"End of the Road"	Boyz II Men	1
159	October 19, 1992	"Please Don't Go"	KWS	3
re	November 9, 1992	"End of the Road	Boyz II Men	10
160	January 18, 1993	"How Do You Talk to an Angel"	The Heights	2
161	February 1, 1993	"Deeper and Deeper"	Madonna	2
162	February 15, 1993	"Flex"	Mad Cobra	3
163	March 8, 1993	"Hip Hop Hooray"	Naughty by Nature	2
164	March 22, 1993	"Informer"	Snow	2
re	April 5, 1993	"Hip Hop Hooray"	Naughty by Nature	3
165	April 26, 1993	"Cats in the Cradle"	Ugly Kid Joe	4
166	May 24, 1993	"No Limit"	2 Unlimited	1
167	May 31, 1993	"That's the Way Love Goes"	Janet Jackson	6
168	July 12, 1993	"Can't Help Falling in Love"	UB40	8
169	September 6, 1993	"Oh Carolina"	Shaggy	2
170	September 20, 1993	"Rain"	Madonna	1
171	September 27, 1993	"If I Had No Loot"	Tony! Toni! Toné!	2
172	October 11, 1993	"If"	Janet Jackson	1
173	October 18, 1993	"Dreamlover"	Mariah Carey	1
174	October 25, 1993	"Whoot, There It Is"	95 South	1
re	November 1, 1993	"Dreamlover"	Mariah Carey	2
175	November 15, 1993	"Soul to Squeeze"	Red Hot Chili Peppers	1
176	November 22, 1993	"Please Forgive Me"	Bryan Adams	4
177	December 20, 1993	"Said I Loved You...But I Lied"	Michael Bolton	12
178	March 14, 1994	"The Power of Love"	Celine Dion	7
179	May 2, 1994	"Streets of Philadelphia"	Bruce Springsteen	1
re	May 9, 1994	"The Power of Love"	Celine Dion	3
re	May 30, 1994	"Streets of Philadelphia"	Bruce Springsteen	2
re	June 13, 1994	"The Power of Love"	Celine Dion	2
180	June 27, 1994	"If You Go"	Jon Secada	5
181	August 1, 1994	"Can You Feel the Love Tonight"	Elton John	9†
182	October 3, 1994	"I'll Make Love to You"	Boyz II Men	5
183	November 7, 1994	"Secret"	Madonna	2
re	November 21, 1994	"I'll Make Love to You"	Boyz II Men	1
re	November 28, 1994	"Secret"	Madonna	7
184	January 16, 1995	"Always"	Bon Jovi	7
185	March 6, 1995	"Sukiyaki"	4 P.M.	7
186	April 24, 1995	"Take a Bow"	Madonna	1
187	May 1, 1995	"Have You Ever Really Loved a Woman?"	Bryan Adams	10
188	July 10, 1995	"This Is How We Do It"	Montell Jordan	2
189	July 24, 1995	"Macarena" (Canada)	Los Del Mar	9
190	September 25, 1995	"I'll Be There for You/You're All I Need to Get By"	Method Man featuring Mary J. Blige	5
191	October 30, 1995	"Fantasy"	Mariah Carey	1
192	November 6, 1995	"Runaway"	Janet Jackson	2
re	November 20, 1995	"Fantasy"	Mariah Carey	11
193	February 5, 1996	"Stayin' Alive"	N-Trance	9
