= Elliot Wolff =

American musician (1955–2016)

- Born: Elliot Marvin Wolff; January 29, 1956; Oklahoma
- Died: June 25, 2016 (aged 60) Santa Fe National Forest, New Mexico
- Occupations: Musician, songwriter, music producer
- Website: www.elliotwolff.com

Elliot Marvin Wolff (January 29, 1956 – June 7 or 25, 2016) was an American musician, songwriter, and music producer. Born in Oklahoma, he was raised in Silver Spring, Maryland. His music catalog is represented by Downtown Music Publishing.

== Career ==
Wolff was the musical director for Peaches & Herb on tour from 1979 to 1982, traveling to Asia and Africa. He also toured with Chaka Khan as a keyboard player. Moving from the Washington, DC area to Los Angeles, he became a staff writer for producer Freddie Perren. He wrote Johnny Gill's top ten hit "Super Love" for Gill's self-titled 1983 album.

After hearing a demo for Wolff's "Straight Up", Paula Abdul recorded it and also Wolff's "Cold Hearted" for her album Forever Your Girl. Both songs charted at number one on Billboard.

Taylor Dayne recorded Wolff's song "Heart of Stone" for her second album Can't Fight Fate.

Other artists who have recorded his songs include Aretha Franklin, Debbie Gibson, Gregg Tripp, Joey Lawrence, Atlantic Starr, Chynna Phillips, Color Me Badd, The Corrs, Dave Koz, A'Me Lorain, Jennifer Holliday, and Stacey Piersa.

== Death ==
He died at the age of 60 sometime between June 7 and June 25, 2016, while on a solo camping and hiking trip near Pecos, New Mexico in Santa Fe National Forest. New Mexico state police had reported that he was last seen on June 7, 2016; they suspended ground and helicopter searches for him on June 12. On June 25, a body was discovered in the forest; based on identification found, it was believed to be Wolff.

== Selected songs ==
Wolff wrote or co-wrote the following songs:

- "Super Love" – Johnny Gill (1983)
- "Straight Up" – Paula Abdul (1988)
- "Cold Hearted" – Paula Abdul (1989)
- "Whole Wide World" – A'Me Lorain (1990)
- "Heart of Stone" – Taylor Dayne (1990)
- "Follow My Heartbeat" – A'Me Lorain (1990)
- "I Don't Want to Live Without You" – Gregg Tripp (1992)
- "Not One More Time" – Stacey Piersa (1994)
- "I'll Remember You" – Atlantic Starr (1994)
- "The Earth, the Sun, the Rain" – Color Me Badd (1996)
- "Love Gives Love Takes" – The Corrs (1997)
