= MC Skat Kat =

- MC Skat Kat in "Opposites Attract" (1989)

Background information
- Origin: United States
- Genre: Hip-hop
- Years active: 1989–1991
- Label: Virgin

MC Skat Kat is an animated cat character who appeared with Paula Abdul in the music video for her song "Opposites Attract" in 1989.

== History ==
MC Skat Kat was created by Michael Patterson and performed by the Wild Pair duo of Bruce DeShazer and Marv Gunn on "Opposites Attract". MC Skat Kat's rap was written and performed by Derrick Stevens, although Romany Malco, who did the majority of the writing for the M.C. Skat Kat & the Stray Mob album, is often mistakenly credited for being the voice of the rap on "Opposites Attract", a story perpetuated by Abdul herself. Derrick Stevens also provided vocals for the character in the MC Skat Kat solo album.

Patterson got the idea for Skat Kat from the Gene Kelly movie Anchors Aweigh, in which Kelly's character dances with Jerry, the mouse from the Tom and Jerry franchise. Patterson would originally play small gigs dressed in full cat attire, though soon after become a studio musician with the character becoming fully animated by members of the Disney and Warner Bros. animation team, working outside the studios between major projects, under the direction of Chris Bailey.

The character released the album The Adventures of MC Skat Kat and the Stray Mob in 1991 on Kings Records. Paula Abdul made an appearance in the music video of the only single "Skat Strut". The single peaked at No. 80 on the US Billboard Hot 100 in late October 1991 and stayed on the chart for four weeks. "Skat Strut" reached No. 11 on the New Zealand Pop Singles chart, No. 9 on the Norwegian Pop Singles chart, No. 28 on the Dutch Pop Singles chart, No. 31 on the Swedish Pop Singles chart and No. 64 on the UK Singles Chart.

MC Skat Kat also featured in "Yakety Yak, Take It Back", an all-star public service music video produced by Warner Bros. in 1991 for the Take It Back Foundation. The music video featured appearances by numerous celebrities, along with Bugs Bunny, Melba Moore as both herself and the voice of a butterfly character, and Dr. John as himself and the voice of Yakety Yak, for a new version of the song "Yakety Yak" with a message about recycling.

MC Skat Kat later appeared in American Dad! season 11's sixth episode "Kiss Kiss Cam Cam", on February 29, 2016. In that episode, Stan hires Kat to mimic a scene in the "Opposites Attract" video, with Stan taking Paula Abdul’s place to make a point to Klaus about how he and Francine stay with each other in spite of their differences. Klaus interrupts them a little after they started.

MC Skat Kat makes a cameo appearance alongside Abdul in the 2022 film Chip 'n Dale: Rescue Rangers. In the 2023 TV series The Muppets Mayhem, Abdul is seen wearing an MC Skat Kat t-shirt.

== The Adventures of MC Skat Kat and the Stray Mob ==
The Adventures of MC Skat Kat and the Stray Mob is a 1991 album from MC Skat Kat. The album came about as the result of Paula Abdul's successful "Opposites Attract" video of 1990, which was directed by Michael Patterson and Candace Reckinger. The Stray Mob consists of cartoon characters Fatz, Taboo, Micetro, Leo, Katleen, and Silk, the first three of whom appeared in the "Opposites Attract" music video. Two music videos for the album were directed by Patterson and Reckinger, only one of which was released.

The only single from the album, "Skat Strut", samples Earth Wind & Fire's 1981 hit "Let's Groove", with Abdul making a brief appearance in the video. Unlike the "Opposites Attract" video, the animation on the "Skat Strut" music video used digital ink and paint. It only reached number 80 on the Billboard Hot 100 but fared better overseas, peaking at numbers 9 and 31 on the Norwegian and Swedish charts, respectively. The vocal style and length in the music video differed from those from the album version.

=== Reception ===
Professional ratings
Review scores
Source	Rating
AllMusic	1.5/5 stars

The album was poorly received and spent only two weeks on the Billboard 200 album chart, peaking at No. 197. In 1999, The A.V. Club deemed it the "least essential" album of the 1990s, calling it "a product of clueless committee thinking and Milli Vanilli-style studio hackwork at its most cynical", and concluding that "never has a mass-produced album been demanded by so few." However, a contemporary review in Billboard magazine described the album more favorably, saying, "Contents are very mainstream dance/rap that could play well in Peoria and elsewhere. Rapping is more than adequate and the music, especially on slow-grooving 'The Kat In The Casino,' is enjoyable."

=== Track listing ===
1. "Big Time" – 3:53
2. "I Ain't No Kitty" – 4:37
3. "No Dogs Allowed" – 5:28
4. "Gotta Get Up" – 4:00
5. "Kat in the Casino" – 4:36
6. "On the Prowl" – 4:06
7. "Skat Strut" – 3:41
8. "Kat Stories" – 4:02
9. "So Sweet So Young" – 3:47
10. "I Go Crazy" – 3:21
11. "New Kat Swing" – 4:03
12. "Skat Kat's Theme" – 4:39

== Legacy ==
In The Live-Action Animated Film, Kyle Meikle described MC Skat Kat in the "Opposites Attract" video as "a cartoon riff not only on Roger [Rabbit] but also on Anchors Aweigh′s Jerry before him. ... Just as Roger and Eddie [Valiant] move from foes to friends in fits and starts, Abdul and Skat Kat oscillate between gibing and jiving; throughout the video's three and a half minutes, the pop star engages in a visual, and sometimes physical, tug-of-war with her 2D admirer. ... Like Roger Rabbit, 'Opposites Attract' speculates that maybe, just maybe, live action and animation could be foes and friends (and maybe more)."

== Discography ==
=== Albums ===
- The Adventures of MC Skat Kat and the Stray Mob (1991) (Billboard 200: #197)

=== Singles ===
List of singles, with selected chart positions
Title	Year	Peak chart positions							Album
Title	Year	US	AUS	NLD	NZ	NOR	SWE	UK	Album
"Skat Strut"	1991	80	82	28	11	9	31	64	The Adventures of MC Skat Kat and the Stray Mob
