= (It's Just) The Way That You Love Me =

1989 single by Paula Abdul

Single by Paula Abdul

from the album Forever Your Girl
- Released: August 2, 1988; September 15, 1989 (re-release)
- Recorded: October 1987
- Studio: Creation Audio (Minneapolis, MN)
- Genre: New jack swing; techno-dance; funk
- Length: 5:21 (album version); 4:01 (single version)
- Label: Virgin
- Songwriter: Oliver Leiber
- Producer: Oliver Leiber

Paula Abdul singles chronology
"Knocked Out" (1988)	"(It's Just) The Way That You Love Me" (1988)	"Straight Up" (1988)

Licensed audio
- "The Way That You Love Me" on YouTube

"The Way That You Love Me" (retitled "(It's Just) The Way That You Love Me" for its 1989 re-release) is a song by American singer and dancer Paula Abdul. It is taken from her debut studio album Forever Your Girl (1988) and was the album's second single. Written and produced by Oliver Leiber, son of Jerry Leiber of Leiber and Stoller fame, it was released on August 2, 1988, via Virgin Records America in its remixed form. The parentheses "(It's Just)" was added to avoid confusion with Karyn White's "The Way You Love Me" which was also climbing the charts the same time.

The track was initially a moderate success, peaking within the top ten of the US Hot Black Singles chart but stalled at number 88 on the Billboard Hot 100 and alienated the little fanbase Abdul had built up from her debut single "Knocked Out". Following the release of the succeeding three singles from Forever Your Girl, all of which topped the Billboard Hot 100, the track was re-released on September 15, 1989, in its original version. This version peaked at number three, and became her longest charting single to date. The track had little success internationally.

== Composition ==
The song is performed in the key of D♯ minor with a tempo of 120 beats per minute. Abdul's vocals span from A♯_{3} to D♯_{5}. Lyrically, the track "organizes diverse things that illustrate wealth and power by brand names" and how "material things are unimportant by comparison with the way he loves her."

== Critical reception ==
Betty Hollars and John Martinucci of the Gavin Report responded favorably, calling it "one of the finer follow-ups" to "Knocked Out". Their colleague Dave Sholin reviewed the 1989 reissue saying, "While not "new" in a handful of markets, the vast majority of stations didn't air it the first time around. Of course, the single that followed went "straight up" and the rest is history. Expect this second run at the chart to be more successful." Cashbox reviewed positively writing that it has "sensational production value" that "elevates this funk rave-up."

== Chart performance ==
"The Way That You Love Me" debuted on the US Billboard Hot Black Singles (now known as Hot R&B/Hip Hop Songs) chart the week of September 10, 1988, at number 75. It reached a peak of number 10 on November 12, 1988, her second consecutive urban top ten hit following "Knocked Out". However, it stalled at number 88 on the Billboard Hot 100 and number 75 on the Cash Box Top 100. It was re-released in September 1989, peaking at number three on the Billboard Hot 100 and topped the Cash Box Top 100 the week of December 2, 1989. It also reached number two on the Radio & Records CHR chart on December 2, 1989, behind Milli Vanilli's "Blame It on the Rain".

In the United Kingdom, "The Way That You Love Me" was also Abdul's second single release following "Knocked Out" in 1988. It failed to chart the Top 100. "The Way That You Love Me" was re-released on November 13, 1989. It became Abdul's least successful release charting at number 74 on the UK singles chart.

== Music video ==
The song's first video was Abdul's first with director David Fincher in July 1988, who would later direct her most successful videos. It consisted of Abdul dancing and singing with male dancers at a photo shoot, while expensive product shots were flashed in and out. It also featured Abdul's first tap dancing sequence, which she would use again in her videos for "Straight Up", "Opposites Attract", and "Forever Your Girl".

A new video was made in August 1989 with the same director and theme for the single's rerelease. It consisted of less dancing and more interaction between Abdul and her material world.

== Track listings and formats ==
US 12"

1. "The Way That You Love Me" (12" remix)
2. "The Way That You Love Me" (7" dub)
3. "The Way That You Love Me" (Houseafire mix)

US cassette

1. "The Way That You Love Me" (7" Radio edit)
2. "The Way That You Love Me" (7" dub)

US promo/Euro 5"/3" CD singles

1. "The Way That You Love Me" (7" Radio edit)
2. "The Way That You Love Me" (12" remix)
3. "The Way That You Love Me" (7" dub)
4. "The Way That You Love Me" (Houseafire mix; on the Euro 3" single, this mix is faded early, at 2:53)

=== Official mixes ===
- Album version – 5:21
- LP edit – 4:02 (re-released in 1989 used on Version 2 of video)
- 7" radio edit – 4:07
- Single mix – 4:00 (Shorter version of 7", omits spoken part)
- 12" extended remix – 6:55
- 7" dub – 5:11
- Houseafire Mix – 6:35
- Housefire Edit – 4:42
- Housefire Short Edit – 2:53
- UK Remix – 5:44
- 7" Dance Edit – 5:03

== Charts ==
=== Weekly charts ===
==== Original release ====
Chart (1988)	Peak position
Australia (ARIA)	76
US Billboard Hot 100	88
US Dance Club Songs (Billboard)	18
US Dance Singles Sales (Billboard)	11
US Hot R&B/Hip-Hop Songs (Billboard)	10
US Cash Box Top 100 Singles	75
US Top Black Contemporary Singles (Cash Box)	8
US Urban Contemporary (Gavin Report)	11
US Urban Contemporary (Radio & Records)	7

==== Re-release ====
Chart (1989–1990)	Peak position
Canada Retail Singles (The Record)	9
Canada Top Singles (RPM)	5
New Zealand (Recorded Music NZ)	12
UK Singles (Official Charts)	74
US Billboard Hot 100	3
US Cash Box Top 100 Singles	1
US Top 40 (Gavin Report)	4
US Contemporary Hit Radio (Radio & Records)	2

=== Year-end charts ===
Chart (1989)	Position
Canada Top Singles (RPM)	84
US Top 40 (Gavin Report)	38
US CHR (Radio & Records)	56
Chart (1990)	Position
US Billboard Hot 100	86
