= Forever Your Girl =

Studio album by Paula Abdul
- Released: June 13, 1988
- Recorded: October 1987–April 1988
- Studios: Creation Audio (Minneapolis); Studio Masters (Los Angeles); Silverlake (Los Angeles); Kren Studio (Los Angeles); JHL Sound (Pacific Palisades); Studio 55 (Los Angeles); Cochrane (Studio City); Fantasy (Berkeley); House of Music (West Orange)
- Genre: Dance-pop
- Length: 44:35
- Label: Virgin
- Producers: Oliver Leiber; Glen Ballard; Elliot Wolff; L.A. Reid; Babyface; Jesse Johnson; Curtis Williams

Paula Abdul chronology
Forever Your Girl (1988)	Shut Up and Dance: Mixes (1990)

Singles from Forever Your Girl
- 1. "Knocked Out" Released: May 4, 1988; 2. "The Way That You Love Me" Released: August 2, 1988; 3. "Straight Up" Released: November 22, 1988; 4. "Forever Your Girl" Released: February 20, 1989; 5. "Cold Hearted" Released: June 15, 1989; 6. "Opposites Attract" Released: November 17, 1989

Forever Your Girl is the debut album by American singer Paula Abdul. It was released on June 13, 1988 through Virgin Records. (Note: RIAA's official website listed the release date as June 13, 1988.) The album was Abdul's breakthrough into the music industry after being a choreographer for high-profile clients including the California Raisins, George Michael, ZZ Top, Duran Duran and most notably Janet Jackson. At the time of its release, it was the most successful debut album and was the first time that a female artist scored four US Billboard Hot 100 number-one singles from her first album. It is currently certified 7× Platinum by the RIAA.

== Background ==
In 1987, Paula Abdul, who had built up her professional reputation as a choreographer for the Los Angeles Lakers and high-profile artists including George Michael, ZZ Top, Duran Duran and Janet Jackson, recorded a demo using her savings. Soon thereafter, she was signed to Virgin Records by Jeff Ayeroff, who had worked in marketing at A&M Records with Jackson. Although she was a skilled dancer and choreographer, Abdul's vocal abilities were unimpressive and with Ayeroff's support, she underwent training for her mezzo-soprano voice. Ayeroff recalled signing Abdul to a recording contract years later, stating: "She said, 'I can sing, you know. I want to do an album.' Paula's in our industry. Here's someone with a personality and she's gorgeous, and she can dance. If she can sing, she could be a star. So she went into the studio and cut a demo record and she could sing." The album was made on a budget of $72,000.

== Release and reception ==
Professional ratings
Review scores
Source	Rating
AllMusic	4/5 stars
Christgau's Record Guide	C
The Encyclopedia of Popular Music	3/5 stars
Los Angeles Daily News	C
Number One	3.5/5 stars
The Rolling Stone Album Guide	3/5 stars

On October 7, 1989, 64 weeks after its July 23, 1988, debut on the chart, Forever Your Girl hit number one on the Billboard 200 album chart, the longest an album was on the market before hitting number one. It returned to the number one spot in early 1990 for 9 weeks, the album spending 10 weeks in total at number one. The album was eventually certified seven times Platinum in the US by the RIAA and has sold over 12 million copies worldwide.

The album includes four number one Billboard Hot 100 singles: "Straight Up", "Forever Your Girl", "Cold Hearted" and "Opposites Attract", which places Forever Your Girl in a tie (with several other artists) for second most number-one songs from a single album, and ties it for the most number ones in a debut album. Abdul is only one of three artists, the others being George Michael and Mariah Carey, to have four number-one singles from their debut album. The re-released "(It's Just) The Way That You Love Me" reached number three, and "Knocked Out" reached number 41. The album also reached number four on the Billboard R&B album chart, while "Straight Up", "Opposites Attract", "Knocked Out", and "(It's Just) The Way That You Love Me" all reached the top 10 of the R&B tracks chart.

By 1998, Billboard magazine reported that Forever Your Girl was the most successful album released by the Virgin Records label. The Los Angeles Daily News called the album "a fine starmaker vehicle", stating that Abdul "applies a come-hither whisper to a likable batch of melodies... What's frustrating is that Abdul's voice is buried beneath bustling arrangements on tunes like 'Opposites Attract' and 'Knocked Out'."

== Accolades ==
Year	Organization	Accolade	Result
1990	American Music Awards	Favorite Pop/Rock Album	Won
1990	Billboard Music Awards	#1 World Album	Nominated
1990	Juno Awards	International Album of the Year	Nominated

== Track listing ==
No.	Title	Writer(s)	Producer(s)	Length
1.	"The Way That You Love Me"	Oliver Leiber	Leiber	5:22
2.	"Knocked Out"	Babyface; Daryl Simmons; L.A. Reid	Reid; Babyface	3:52
3.	"Opposites Attract"	Leiber	Leiber	4:24
4.	"State of Attraction"	Glen Ballard; Siedah Garrett	Ballard	4:07
5.	"I Need You"	Jesse Johnson; Ta Mara	Johnson	5:01
6.	"Forever Your Girl"	Leiber	Leiber	4:58
7.	"Straight Up"	Elliot Wolff	Wolff	4:11
8.	"Next to You"	Curtis Williams; Kendall Stubbs; Sandra Williams	C. Williams	4:26
9.	"Cold Hearted"	Wolff	Wolff	3:51
10.	"One or the Other"	Paula Abdul; C. Williams; Duncan Pain	C. Williams	4:10
Total length:				44:22

== Personnel ==
Adapted from AllMusic.

- Paula Abdul – lead vocals
- Marvin Gunn and Bruce DeShazer aka Tony Christian – backing vocals
- Peter Arata – mixing assistant
- Babyface – keyboards, producer, backing vocals
- Glen Ballard – drums, producer, programming
- Russ Bracher – engineer
- Pattie Brooks – backing vocals
- Wally Buck – engineer
- Francis Buckley – engineer, mixing
- Annette Cisneros – assistant engineer
- Dave Cochran – guitar, backing vocals
- Keith "KC" Cohen – mixing, producer
- Delisa Davis – backing vocals
- Tami Day – backing vocals
- Jimmy Demers – backing vocals
- Eddie M. – saxophone on "I Need You"
- Al Fleming – assistant engineer
- Basil Fung – guitar
- Jon Gass – engineer, mixing
- Bobby Gonzales – guitar
- Danny Grigsby – assistant engineer
- Evelyn Halus – backing vocals
- Dann Huff – guitar
- Tim Jaquette – engineer, mixing
- Jesse Johnson – drums, keyboards, producer
- Cliff Jones – assistant engineer, engineer
- Kayo – synthesizer, synthesizer bass
- Oliver Leiber – arranger, drum programming, guitar, keyboards, producer, programming
- Jeff Lorber – drum programming, engineer, guest artist, keyboards, producer
- Yvette Marine – backing vocals
- Pat McDougal – assistant engineer
- Lucia Newell – backing vocals
- Ricky P. – keyboards
- Pebbles – guest artist, backing vocals
- L.A. Reid – drums, guest artist, percussion programming, producer
- Angel Rogers – backing vocals
- Josh Schneider – assistant engineer
- Daryl Simmons – backing vocals
- Bob Somma – guitar
- St. Paul – arranger, bass, keyboards, Organ, vocoder
- Kendall Stubbs – engineer
- Randy Weber – programming, synthesizer
- Steve Weise – engineer
- Troy Williams – alto saxophone on "Forever Your Girl"
- Wild Pair – vocals, backing vocals

== Charts ==
=== Weekly charts ===
Weekly chart performance for Forever Your Girl
Chart (1988–1990)	Peak position
Australian Albums (ARIA)	1
Canada Top Albums/CDs (RPM)	1
Dutch Albums (Album Top 100)	19
European Albums (Music & Media)	13
French Albums (SNEP)	12
German Albums (Offizielle Top 100)	24
Japanese Albums (Oricon)	94
New Zealand Albums (RMNZ)	19
Norwegian Albums (VG-lista)	17
Swedish Albums (Sverigetopplistan)	6
Swiss Albums (Schweizer Hitparade)	15
UK Albums (Official Charts)	3
US Billboard 200	1
US Top R&B/Hip-Hop Albums (Billboard)	10

=== Year-end charts ===
Year-end chart performance for Forever Your Girl
Chart (1989)	Position
Canada Top Albums/CDs (RPM)	6
Dutch Albums (Album Top 100)	72
New Zealand Albums (RMNZ)	50
US Billboard 200	3
US Top R&B/Hip-Hop Albums (Billboard)	24
Chart (1990)	Position
Australian Albums (ARIA)	20
Canada Top Albums/CDs (RPM)	9
European Albums (Music & Media)	92
UK Albums (OCC)	83
US Billboard 200	6
US Top R&B/Hip-Hop Albums (Billboard)	79

Decade-end chart performance for Forever Your Girl by Paula Abdul
Chart (1990–1999)	Position
US Billboard 200	53

All-end chart performance for Forever Your Girl by Paula Abdul
Chart	Position
US Billboard 200 (Women)	10

== Certifications ==
Region	Certification	Certified units/sales
Australia (ARIA)	Platinum	70,000^{^}
Canada (Music Canada)	7× Platinum	800,000
Hong Kong (IFPI Hong Kong)	Gold	10,000^{*}
New Zealand (RMNZ)	Platinum	15,000^{^}
Sweden (GLF)	Gold	50,000^{^}
Switzerland (IFPI Switzerland)	Gold	25,000^{^}
United Kingdom (BPI)	Platinum	300,000^{^}
United States (RIAA)	7× Platinum	7,000,000^{^}
^{*} Sales figures based on certification alone.^{^} Shipments figures based on certification alone.

== See also ==
- List of best-selling albums by women
