= Cold Hearted =

1989 single by Paula Abdul

Single by Paula Abdul

from the album Forever Your Girl
- B-side: "One or the Other"
- Released: June 2, 1989
- Studio: JHL Sound (Pacific Palisades, California)
- Genre: New jack swing; dance-pop
- Length: 3:51
- Label: Virgin
- Songwriter: Elliot Wolff
- Producer: Elliot Wolff

Paula Abdul singles chronology
"Forever Your Girl" (1989)	"Cold Hearted" (1989)	"Opposites Attract" (1989)

Music video
- "Cold Hearted" on YouTube

"Cold Hearted" is a song by American singer Paula Abdul, released in June 1989 as the fifth single from her debut album, Forever Your Girl (1988). It was written and co-produced by Elliot Wolff and reached number one on the US Billboard Hot 100, becoming the album's third song to top the US chart.

== Composition ==
"Cold Hearted" is written in the key of G minor and follows a tempo of 122 beats per minute. The song follows a chord progression of Gm – E♭maj7 – Dm7, and Abdul's vocals span one-and-a-half octaves, from F_{3} to B♭_{4}.

== Critical reception ==
Paul Lester from Melody Maker wrote, "'Cold Hearted' has been fabulously cluttered up and fleshed out by Chad Jackson, weighed down with details yet buoyed up by a deliciously light, slippery beat. Simply irresistible."

== Chart performance ==
"Cold Hearted" topped the Billboard Hot 100 chart for one week in September 1989, giving Abdul her third US number-one single. "Cold Hearted" was ranked sixth on Billboard's Year-End Hot 100 ranking of 1989. It spent a total of 21 weeks within the Billboard Hot 100. In Canada, "Cold Hearted" peaked at number one according to The Record magazine and number two according to RPM magazine, while in Finland, in entered the top 20.

== Music video ==
The official music video for "Cold Hearted" was directed by David Fincher and spent more than three weeks on top of MTV's video rotation list. It uses the album version of the song, with the rap section from the extended 12" version spliced in after the 3rd chorus. The inspiration for the video came from Bob Fosse's choreography of the "Take Off with Us" scene in the movie All That Jazz. Abdul dances for music executives with a group of semi-nude dancers. Abdul was wearing a black fishnet dress which exposed her belly button and was sporting a hat of the German "Kriegsmarine". The dance floor included scaffolding where Abdul and her dancers hang and dance suggestively. The video was filmed in the same Downtown Los Angeles location where Christina Aguilera's music video for "What a Girl Wants" would later be filmed. The video and its "late-'80s energy" served as a visual inspiration for the music video of Ariana Grande's 2024 single "Yes, And?".

== Track listings ==
Non-UK 7-inch and cassette single

1. "Cold Hearted" – 3:34
2. "One or the Other" – 4:10

US 12-inch single

A1. "Cold Hearted" (Quiverin' 12-inch) – 5:10
A2. "Cold Hearted" (7-inch edit) – 3:30
B1. "Cold Hearted" (Chillin' Bass dub) – 4:06
B2. "Cold Hearted" (a cappella) – 1:04
B3. "Cold Hearted" (instrumental) – 4:02

Canadian, European, and Australian 12-inch single

A1. "Cold Hearted" (extended version) – 6:50
A2. "Cold Hearted" (Cold Hearted House mix) – 6:41
B1. "Cold Hearted" (dubstramental) – 5:41
B2. "Cold Hearted" (percapella) – 4:10
B3. "One or the Other" – 4:11

Japanese maxi-CD single

1. "Cold Hearted" (extended version)
2. "Knocked Out" (extended version)
3. "Straight Up" (extended version)
4. "Forever Your Girl (extended version)

Japanese mini-CD single

1. "Straight Up"
2. "Cold Hearted"

UK 7-inch and cassette single

1. "Cold Hearted" (Chad Jackson 7-inch remix)
2. "Cold Hearted" (US 7-inch remix)

UK 12-inch single

A1. "Cold Hearted" (Chad Jackson extended remix)
B1. "Cold Hearted" (Chad Jackson Ambient mix)
B2. "Cold Hearted" (Chad Jackson Breaks and Beats mix)

UK 12-inch picture disc

A1. "Cold Hearted" (Cold Hearted House mix)
B1. "Cold Hearted" (dubstramental)
B2. "Cold Hearted" (US 7-inch version)

UK CD single

1. "Cold Hearted" (Chad Jackson 7-inch mix)
2. "Cold Hearted" (Chad Jackson extended remix)
3. "Cold Hearted" (percapella)
4. "Cold Hearted" (7-inch edit)
- Note: Track three is mislabeled as the 12-inch extended mix on the liner notes, and track four is not listed at all.

== Personnel ==
- Paula Abdul: Vocals
- Dann Huff: Guitars
- Elliot Wolff: Keyboards, synthesizers, drum programming

== Production ==
- Arranged and produced by Elliot Wolff; co-produced by Keith "KC" Cohen
- Recorded and mixed by Keith "KC" Cohen

== Charts ==
=== Weekly charts ===
Chart (1989–1990)	Peak position
Australia (ARIA)	68
Canada Retail Singles (The Record)	1
Canada Top Singles (RPM)	2
Canada Dance/Urban (RPM)	1
Canada Retail Singles (RPM)	7
Colombia (El Tiempo)	7
Finland (Suomen virallinen lista)	17
France (SNEP)	33
Italy Airplay (Music & Media)	3
Netherlands (Single Top 100)	63
New Zealand (Recorded Music NZ)	25
Quebec (ADISQ)	11
UK Singles (Official Charts)	46
US Billboard Hot 100	1
US Dance Club Songs (Billboard)	19
US Dance Singles Sales (Billboard)	6
West Germany (GfK)	38

=== Year-end charts ===
Chart (1989)	Position
Canada Top Singles (RPM)	13
Canada Dance/Urban (RPM)	15
US Billboard Hot 100	6
US 12-inch Singles Sales (Billboard)	45

== Certifications ==
Region	Certification	Certified units/sales
Canada (Music Canada)	Gold	50,000^{^}
United States (RIAA)	Platinum	1,000,000^{‡}
^{^} Shipments figures based on certification alone.^{‡} Sales+streaming figures based on certification alone.

== Release history ==
Region	Date	Format(s)	Label(s)	Ref.
United States	June 2, 1989	7-inch vinyl; 12-inch vinyl; cassette	Virgin	
Japan	September 21, 1989	CD	Virgin; Siren	
United Kingdom	September 17, 1990	7-inch vinyl; 12-inch vinyl; CD; cassette	Virgin America	
