= Straight Up (Paula Abdul song) =

1988 single by Paula Abdul

Single by Paula Abdul

from the album Forever Your Girl
- B-side: "Opposites Attract"
- Released: November 22, 1988
- Studio: JHL Sound (Pacific Palisades, California)
- Genre: Dance-pop; new jack swing; funk
- Length: 4:11 (album version); 3:47 (single version)
- Label: Virgin
- Songwriter: Elliot Wolff
- Producer: Elliot Wolff

Paula Abdul singles chronology
"(It's Just) The Way That You Love Me" (1988)	"Straight Up" (1988)	"Forever Your Girl" (1989)

Music video
- "Straight Up" on YouTube

"Straight Up" is a song by American recording artist Paula Abdul from her debut studio album, Forever Your Girl (1988). The song is a mid-tempo dance-pop song with influence from new jack swing. Written and produced entirely by Elliot Wolff, the song was released as the album's third single on November 22, 1988, by Virgin Records.

"Straight Up" became Abdul's first top-40 hit in the United States, eventually topping the Billboard Hot 100 in February 1989. The single brought Abdul widespread public attention and remains her biggest international hit to date, reaching the top 10 in at least 16 countries. The song was also included in her six compilation albums, released between 1998 and 2013.

The song received positive reviews from music critics, with Daniel J. Levitin's This Is Your Brain on Music praising it as "hold[ing] a certain appeal over many, many listenings." It also earned Abdul several award nominations in the US, most notably including her first Grammy nomination in the category of Best Female Pop Vocal Performance at the 32nd Annual Grammy Awards in 1990 and six other nominations for its accompanying music video, which was directed by David Fincher, at the 1989 MTV Video Music Awards.

== Background ==
According to Paula Abdul, her mother Lorraine found this song for her. She explains that her mother knew someone whose boyfriend was an aspiring songwriter, and she got "Straight Up" as an 8-track demo. The demo version was "so bad" that Abdul's mother was "crying laughing" at it and threw it in the trash. But Abdul heard something she liked in it and retrieved it. At that time she was a full-time choreographer, and on the side late at night she was recording music. The record label did not think the song was any good but Abdul offered to record two songs they wanted, which she did not like, if they would let her do "Straight Up". The song was recorded at a cost of $3,000. Later a friend of hers told her that somebody with her same name was being played on a northern California radio station. "Literally, within 10 days I [it] sold a million copies." The song was originally recorded in a bathroom and in the masters of the recording someone in the next apartment can be heard yelling "Shut up".

"Straight Up" was the third single released from her debut album Forever Your Girl, after "Knocked Out" and "The Way That You Love Me." While the latter found modest success on the Billboard R&B singles chart, radio station KMEL in San Francisco started playing "Straight Up" from the album. The label switched promotion "The Way That You Love Me" to "Straight Up". The strategy paid off, as "Straight Up" spent three weeks at No. 1 on the Billboard Hot 100 in the U.S. "The Way That You Love Me" was promoted a year later and became Abdul's fourth (of five) Top 5 hits from the album in the U.S. One of the 12" versions was remixed by LA "Powermixers" Chris Modig and Boris Granich, known for their special power mixes at Power 106 during the 1980s.

== Composition ==
"Straight Up" is performed in the key of D minor with a shuffling tempo of 96 beats per minute in common time and a chord progression of Dm–B♭–Gm–Am. Running a total length of four minutes and eleven seconds in its original version. The song finds Abdul's vocals span from A_{3} to C_{5} in the song, while the singer questioning her partner if he was genuinely loving her or "just having fun".

== Commercial performance ==
"Straight Up" attained breakthrough success for Abdul in the States. After debuting at number 79 on the US Billboard Hot 100 chart on the week of December 3, 1988, the single quickly rose up the chart. By the week of January 21, 1989, the song reached number 13 on the chart, becoming her first top 40 entry and her first number one on the Billboard Hot 100 chart on the week of February 11, 1989, dethroning Sheriff's "When I'm with You" and remaining on the top spot for three consecutive weeks. The song has since spent a total 25 consecutive chart weeks, thus tying with her later re-released second single as her longest charting performance on the Billboard Hot 100, and was eventually ranked as the fourth biggest hit of 1989 on Billboard's year-end chart for that year. The single was certified 2x Platinum in 2024 by the RIAA with sales of two million units, and remains her best-selling single in the country to date.

The song also attained international success, reaching the top 10 in at least 16 countries. In addition to topping the charts in the United States, the single also reached the top in Norway. It reached number two in Canada, Greece, Luxembourg, the Netherlands and Sweden, and number three in Denmark, Switzerland, the United Kingdom and West Germany. It also reached number five in Belgium and Finland, number six in Ireland and New Zealand, and number eight in Austria and Finland. In France, the single fell short of the top 10, reaching number 12. The single fell short of the top 20 in Australia, reaching number 27.

The song was used in 2011 as a lip sync song in the third season of reality competition series RuPaul's Drag Race, where contestants Raja and Carmen Carrera had to perform it to avoid elimination on the episode "Jocks in Frocks".

== Critical reception ==
Acclaimed by critics, the song placed 23rd in the annual Pazz & Jop critics' year-end poll for the year 1989.

Jerry Smith from Music Week wrote, "Having had a US number one, this catchy dance groove by a successful choreographer gets its UK release with the seemingly unavoidable fate that it should do comparably well here." Daniel J. Levitin's This Is Your Brain on Music praised "Straight Up" for "hold[ing] a certain appeal over many, many listenings."

Tom Breihan of Stereogum views the song as "the sort of fizzy pop-music brilliance" which cannot be ignored with "a great sense of timing"; as the piece Abdul was "put on earth to sing" along with her dance abilities; and as "fitting the 1989 zeitgeist". He analyzes the composition as having "some great hesitation" and "all these" electronic elements "falling all over each other" while all hitting at "the exact right moment"; and as having "hooks on top of hooks" via "many catchy little things" such as a "deliriously fake" horn-blats, "vrooming" synth just before the chorus, power-chord guitars "buried in the mix" and a "huge" drums sound. With that, he views that the vocals are greatly diminished by the drums and Abdul's lack of "hitting big notes", however projecting "total assurance" on the beats and "a ton of personality". He adds that the chorus with the “oh oh oh” backup vocals set Abdul off "perfectly" and that the "perfect" bridge "crushes it" with the "so silly and so perfect" “ah-buh-buh-buh-bye...” bit and escalating drums "emergency". He opines that the lyrics showcase "slightness which works" with Abdul character's questioning of her lover seeming "stressed and desperate" at points but mostly "having fun" and "flirting". Analyzing the music video, he views the song's "hard, physical" aspect being "emphasized" via a "near-masterpiece" vision of "flashy but simple opening" with Abdul's pre-music dance and a "stark" black-and-white color scheme which "draws attention" to Abdul's moves alongside other "grabbing" appearances and visuals.

== Music video ==
The song became so popular that it ascended up the charts before a music video had even been shot for the song. The black and white video, directed by American director David Fincher and choreographed by Abdul herself in mid-January 1989, won four 1989 MTV Video Music Awards for Best Female Video, Best Editing, Best Choreography and the first Best Dance Video. The video features an appearance by her friend, comedian Arsenio Hall, whose popular talk show The Arsenio Hall Show had premiered a few weeks prior to the video shoot. Djimon Hounsou also appears. Released later that month, the video at the time went into very heavy rotation on MTV, helping further Abdul's popularity.

== Track listings and formats ==
- Australia 12-inch single
1. "Straight Up" (Ultimix)
2. "Opposites Attract" (1990 mix)
3. "Straight Up" (single version)
- French 12-inch vinyl
1. "Straight Up" (12-inch remix)
2. "Straight Up" (Power mix)
3. "Straight Up" (House mix)
4. "Straight Up" (Marley Marl mix)
- US 12-inch single
1. "Straight Up" (12-inch remix)
2. "Straight Up" (Power mix)
3. "Straight Up" (House mix)
- Japanese mini-CD single
1. "Straight Up"
2. "Cold Hearted"

== Personnel ==
Personnel are adapted from the liner notes of Forever Your Girl.

- Elliot Wolff – songwriter, producer, arrangement, LinnDrum programming, synthesizer programming, synthesizers
- Keith "K.C." Cohen – producer, recording, mixing
- Josh Schneider – assistant engineer
- Annette Cisneros – assistant engineer
- Peter Arata – mixing assistant
- Paula Abdul – lead vocals, background vocals
- Delissa Davis – background vocals
- Dann Huff – overdrive guitar
- Dan Hersch – mastering

== Charts ==
=== Weekly charts ===
Chart (1988–1989)	Peak position
Australia (ARIA)	27
Austria (Ö3 Austria Top 40)	8
Belgium (Ultratop 50 Flanders)	5
Canada Retail Singles (The Record)	1
Canada Top Singles (RPM)	2
Canada Dance/Urban (RPM)	1
Denmark (IFPI)	3
Europe (Eurochart Hot 100)	2
Finland (Suomen virallinen lista)	8
France (SNEP)	12
Greece (IFPI)	2
Ireland (IRMA)	6
Luxembourg (Radio Luxembourg)	2
Netherlands (Dutch Top 40)	3
Netherlands (Single Top 100)	2
New Zealand (Recorded Music NZ)	6
Norway (VG-lista)	1
Quebec (ADISQ)	4
Sweden (Sverigetopplistan)	2
Switzerland (Schweizer Hitparade)	3
UK Singles (Official Charts)	3
US Billboard Hot 100	1
US Adult Contemporary (Billboard)	39
US Dance Club Songs (Billboard)	3
US Dance Singles Sales (Billboard)	1
US Hot R&B/Hip-Hop Songs (Billboard)	2
US Cash Box Top 100	1
US Dance Tracks (Dance Music Report)	1
US Contemporary Hit Radio (Radio & Records)	1
US Urban Contemporary (Radio & Records)	4
West Germany (GfK)	3

Chart (2019)	Peak position
Poland Airplay (ZPAV)	61

=== Year-end charts ===
Chart (1989)	Position
Belgium (Ultratop)	46
Canada Top Singles (RPM)	25
Canada Dance/Urban (RPM)	9
Europe (Eurochart Hot 100)	16
Netherlands (Dutch Top 40)	16
Netherlands (Single Top 100)	16
New Zealand (RIANZ)	9
Switzerland (Schweizer Hitparade)	16
UK Singles (OCC)	31
US Billboard Hot 100	4
US 12-inch Singles Sales (Billboard)	9
US Dance Club Play (Billboard)	35
US Hot Black Singles (Billboard)	48
US Cash Box Top 100	8
West Germany (Media Control)	17

== Certifications ==
Region	Certification	Certified units/sales
Canada (Music Canada)	Platinum	80,000^{‡}
Sweden (GLF)	Gold	25,000^{^}
United Kingdom (BPI)	Silver	200,000^{^}
United States (RIAA)	2× Platinum	2,000,000^{‡}
^{^} Shipments figures based on certification alone.^{‡} Sales+streaming figures based on certification alone.

== Release history ==
Region	Version	Date	Format(s)	Label(s)	Ref.
United States	Original	November 22, 1988	7-inch vinyl; 12-inch vinyl; cassette	Virgin	
United Kingdom	Original	February 20, 1989	7-inch vinyl; 12-inch vinyl	Virgin; Siren	
Japan	Original	March 1, 1989	Mini-CD	Virgin; Siren	
Australia	Ultimix mix	May 28, 1990	7-inch vinyl; 12-inch vinyl; cassette	Virgin	

== See also ==
- List of Billboard Hot 100 number-one singles of the 1980s
