= Baby Don't Forget My Number =

1988 single by Milli Vanilli

- European CD single cover

Single by Milli Vanilli

from the album All or Nothing and Girl You Know It's True
- B-side: "Too Much Monkey Business"
- Released: 12 December 1988
- Genre: Dance-pop
- Length: 4:10 (album version); 4:00 (single version); 4:28 (video version)
- Label: Hansa; Arista
- Songwriters: Frank Farian; Brad Howell
- Producer: Frank Farian

Milli Vanilli singles chronology
"Girl You Know It's True" (1988)	"Baby Don't Forget My Number" (1988)	"Blame It on the Rain" (1989)

Music video
- "Baby Don't Forget My Number" on YouTube

"Baby Don't Forget My Number" is a song by German dance-pop group Milli Vanilli. The track was released in December 1988 as the second single from their debut album, All or Nothing (1988), as well as its American counterpart, Girl You Know It's True (1989). It became the first of their three number-one hits on the US Billboard Hot 100 chart in 1989, earning a gold certification from the Recording Industry Association of America (RIAA). Worldwide, the single reached the top 10 in seven other countries and was certified gold in Australia, where it charted for 36 weeks.

== Music video ==
In the music video, Rob Pilatus meets a woman and gets her phone number. Later that day, as he is preparing to call her, Fab Morvan enters the apartment, and a slight breeze blows the sheet of paper with the phone number out the window. The paper is caught under the shoe of a man who enters a taxicab, leading the duo on a bicycle chase across London. Just as the taxicab drops the man off, the duo stops the man, but the paper is gone. Then the duo realize they are in front of the woman's home.

== Charts ==
=== Weekly charts ===
Chart (1988–1989)	Peak position
Australia (ARIA)	17
Belgium (Ultratop 50 Flanders)	14
Canada Retail Singles (The Record)	1
Canada Top Singles (RPM)	3
Canada Dance/Urban (RPM)	1
Europe (Eurochart Hot 100)	18
Finland (Suomen virallinen lista)	3
France (SNEP)	17
Ireland (IRMA)	17
Netherlands (Dutch Top 40)	6
Netherlands (Single Top 100)	7
New Zealand (Recorded Music NZ)	9
Norway (VG-lista)	5
Spain (AFYVE)	3
Switzerland (Schweizer Hitparade)	11
UK Singles (Official Charts)	16
US Billboard Hot 100	1
US Dance Club Songs (Billboard)	10
US Dance Singles Sales (Billboard)	12
US Hot R&B/Hip-Hop Songs (Billboard)	9
US Cash Box Top 100	2
West Germany (GfK)	9

=== Year-end charts ===
Chart (1989)	Position
Australia (ARIA)	59
Belgium (Ultratop)	81
Canada Top Singles (RPM)	42
Canada Dance/Urban (RPM)	8
Europe (Eurochart Hot 100)	78
Netherlands (Dutch Top 40)	41
Netherlands (Single Top 100)	65
New Zealand (RIANZ)	16
US Billboard Hot 100	28
West Germany (Media Control)	63

Chart (1990)	Position
Australia (ARIA)	69

== Certifications ==
Region	Certification	Certified units/sales
Australia (ARIA)	Gold	35,000^{^}
United States (RIAA)	Gold	500,000^{^}
^{^} Shipments figures based on certification alone.

== In Popular Culture ==
In 1992, an hilarious song by "Weird Al" Yankovic called "The Plumbing Song"parodied this song along with the other hits by the duo such as Girl You Know It's true and Blame it on the Rain. This can be heard from the album Off the Deep End.
