= Knocked Out =

- U.S. promotional cover

Single by Paula Abdul

from the album Forever Your Girl
- B-side: "Knocked Out" (Instrumental) "Next to You"
- Released: May 1988
- Studio: Studio Masters; Silverlake; (Hollywood, CA)
- Length: 3:52
- Label: Virgin
- Songwriters: Antonio "L.A." Reid; Kenneth "Babyface" Edmonds; Daryl Simmons
- Producers: L.A. Reid; Babyface

Paula Abdul singles chronology
"Knocked Out" (1988)	"(It's Just) The Way That You Love Me" (1988)

Music video
- "Knocked Out" on YouTube

"Knocked Out" is the debut single by American singer and dancer Paula Abdul, released in May 1988 via Virgin Records as the lead single to Abdul's debut studio album Forever Your Girl (1988). The song was written by Babyface, L.A. Reid and Daryl Simmons, and produced by Babyface and Reid, the only track on Forever Your Girl produced by the duo. Babyface and Simmons provide background vocals along with Pebbles and Yvette Marine. "Knocked Out" was later re-released to US radio in May 1990 following its re-issue in the United Kingdom and Europe.

== Critical reception ==
Paul Mathur from Melody Maker wrote, "Paula isn't as clever as Jessica but she's almost as accomplished in the art of artifice. When she sings, plastic takes on whole new forms, Madonna looks like Joni Mitchell and I'm humming for weeks. She cuts her soul pop jib with scissors the size of shears, but she doesn't give two hoots, and for that alone we should cherish her." Dave Sholin of the Gavin Report responded favorably, "If you're lookin' for hooks, this is it. Produced by L.A. Reid and Babyface, the arrangement lends itself to multi-format potential. This former Los Angeles Lakers cheerleader and choreographer for the likes of Janet Jackson is gonna be big." Bill Coleman of Billboard called the track "an appealing number." Ron Wynn of The Commercial Appeal dismissed the song, calling the transition to singing "flawed" and felt that "she [is] better at constructing dance steps than structuring vocals".

== Chart performance ==
"Knocked Out" debuted on the US Billboard Hot 100 on June 18, 1988 at number 93. peaked at number 41 on the US Billboard Hot 100, the first of what would be fourteen charting entries through 1995.

== Music video ==
Abdul's first music video was directed by Danny Kleinman and Limelight Film and Video Productions. The video features Abdul and her dancers working out choreography on the dance floor. It premiered to BET on June 11, 1988.

== Personnel ==
Taken from the Forever Your Girl booklet.

- Paula Abdul – lead and background vocals
- Babyface – songwriter, producer, arranger, keyboards, background vocals
- L.A. Reid – songwriter, producer, arranger, LM-1 programming, percussion programming
- Daryl Simmons – songwriter, arranger, background vocals
- Kayo – Memory Moog bass
- Perri "Pebbles" Reid – background vocals
- Yvette Marine – background vocals

== Charts ==
=== Weekly charts ===
Weekly chart performance for "Knocked Out"
Chart (1988–90)	Peak position
Canada Top Singles (RPM) Shep Pettibone remix version	27
Canada Contemporary Hit Radio (The Record)	18
Europe (Eurochart Hot 100) Shep Pettibone remix version	59
France (SNEP)	45
Ireland (IRMA)	17
Luxembourg (Radio Luxembourg)	15
UK Singles (Official Charts) Shep Pettibone remix version	21
US Billboard Hot 100	41
US Dance Club Songs (Billboard)	14
US Dance Singles Sales (Billboard)	11
US Hot Crossover 30 (Billboard)	4
US Hot R&B/Hip-Hop Songs (Billboard)	8
US Cash Box Top 100	43
US Top 12" Dance Singles (Cash Box)	7
US Top Black Contemporary Singles (Cash Box)	7
US Urban/Contemporary (Gavin Report)	5
US Urban Contemporary (Radio & Records)	6

=== Year-end charts ===
Year-end chart performance for "Knocked Out"
Chart (1988)	Position
US Hot Black Singles (Billboard)	100
US Urban Contemporary (Gavin Report)	69
US Urban (Radio & Records)	80
