= Forever Your Girl (song) =

1989 single by Paula Abdul

Single by Paula Abdul

from the album Forever Your Girl
- B-side: "Next to You"
- Released: February 20, 1989
- Recorded: November 1987–January 1988
- Studio: Creation Audio (Minneapolis, Minnesota)
- Genre: Pop
- Length: 4:58
- Label: Virgin
- Songwriter: Oliver Leiber
- Producer: Oliver Leiber

Paula Abdul singles chronology
"Straight Up" (1988)	"Forever Your Girl" (1989)	"Cold Hearted" (1989)

"Forever Your Girl" is a song by American singer Paula Abdul from her debut studio album, Forever Your Girl (1988). The song was written and produced by Oliver Leiber, with additional production by Keith "K.C." Cohen. Virgin Records released it as the album's fourth single on February 20, 1989. "Forever Your Girl" spent two weeks atop the US Billboard Hot 100 in May 1989, reached number 28 on the Billboard Dance Club Play chart, and peaked at number 11 on the Billboard Adult Contemporary chart. Worldwide, it peaked at number one in Canada and number nine in Finland.

== Composition and lyrics ==
The song is about loyalty in a relationship. Abdul proclaims that, despite rumors that others may be interested in her, none of those matter because she will remain faithful to the man she loves; she will remain "forever his girl." The single version differs slightly from the album version, as it uses more of the background male vocal featuring the Wild Pair, Bruce DeShazer and Marvin Gunn.

== Critical reception ==
Eleanor Levy left an ironically negative review on this single for British music newspaper Record Mirror. She called it "a disappointingly predictable pop song".

== Music video ==
The accompanying music video for the song was directed by David Fincher and features Abdul acting as a choreographer and director of a children's performance. A young Elijah Wood appears in the video, playing the kid in the suit. It also parodies Robert Palmer's "Addicted to Love" video, with three girls dressed like the women of the aforementioned video.

== Track listings ==
7-inch and cassette single

A. "Forever Your Girl" (remix) – 4:12
B. "Next to You" – 4:26

US 12-inch single

A1. "Forever Your Girl" (12-inch version) – 6:33
A2. "Forever Your Girl" (Yo! Greg dub version) – 5:45
B1. "Forever Your Girl" (Saunderson-Grosse House of Love mix) – 6:33
B2. "Straight Up" (Kevin Saunderson club mix) – 6:52
B3. "Next to You" – 4:26

UK and Australian 12-inch single

A1. "Forever Your Girl" (12-inch version) – 6:33
B1. "Next to You" – 4:26
B2. "Straight Up" (Kevin Saunderson club mix) – 6:52

UK mini-CD single

1. "Forever Your Girl" (7-inch remix version) – 4:05
2. "Straight Up" (7-inch version) – 3:50
3. "Next to You" – 4:26
4. "Forever Your Girl" (12-inch version) – 6:33

Australian cassette single

A1. "Forever Your Girl" (remix)
A2. "Straight Up" (Kevin Saunderson club mix)
B1. "Forever Your Girl" (12-inch version)
B2. "Next to You"

Japanese mini-CD single

1. "Forever Your Girl (フォーエバー・ユア・ガール)"
2. "State of Attraction (ステイト・オブ・アトラクション)"

== Credits and personnel ==
Credits are adapted from the liner notes of Forever Your Girl.

- Oliver Leiber – songwriter, producer, arrangement, drum programming, keyboards, guitar
- Keith "K.C." Cohen – producer, mixing
- Steve Weise – engineering
- Paula Abdul – lead vocals, background vocals
- St. Paul – bass, organ
- Troy Williams – alto saxophone
- The Wild Pair – background vocals
- Tami Day – background vocals
- Lucia Newell – background vocals
- Jeff Lorber – additional drum programming, keyboards
- Dan Hersch – mastering

== Charts ==
=== Weekly charts ===
Chart (1989)	Peak position
Australia (ARIA)	51
Belgium (Ultratop 50 Flanders)	17
Canada Retail Singles (The Record)	1
Canada Top Singles (RPM)	1
Canada Dance/Urban (RPM)	2
Europe (Eurochart Hot 100)	30
Finland (Suomen virallinen lista)	9
Ireland (IRMA)	21
Netherlands (Dutch Top 40)	13
Netherlands (Single Top 100)	13
New Zealand (Recorded Music NZ)	11
Quebec (ADISQ)	1
Switzerland (Schweizer Hitparade)	24
UK Singles (Official Charts)	24
US Billboard Hot 100	1
US Adult Contemporary (Billboard)	11
US Dance Club Songs (Billboard)	28
US Dance Singles Sales (Billboard)	8
US Hot R&B/Hip-Hop Songs (Billboard)	54
US Cash Box Top 100	2
US Adult Contemporary (Radio & Records)	9
US Contemporary Hit Radio (Radio & Records)	1
West Germany (GfK)	17

=== Year-end charts ===
Chart (1989)	Position
Canada Top Singles (RPM)	22
US Billboard Hot 100	30

== Certifications ==
Region	Certification	Certified units/sales
United States (RIAA)	Gold	500,000^{^}
^{^} Shipments figures based on certification alone.

== Release history ==
Region	Date	Format(s)	Label(s)	Ref(s).
United States	February 20, 1989	7-inch vinyl; 12-inch vinyl; cassette	Virgin	
United Kingdom	May 15, 1989	7-inch vinyl; 12-inch vinyl; mini-CD; cassette	Siren	
Japan	May 21, 1989	Mini-CD	Virgin Japan; Siren	
