= Flamingo Las Vegas =

Casino hotel in Paradise, Nevada

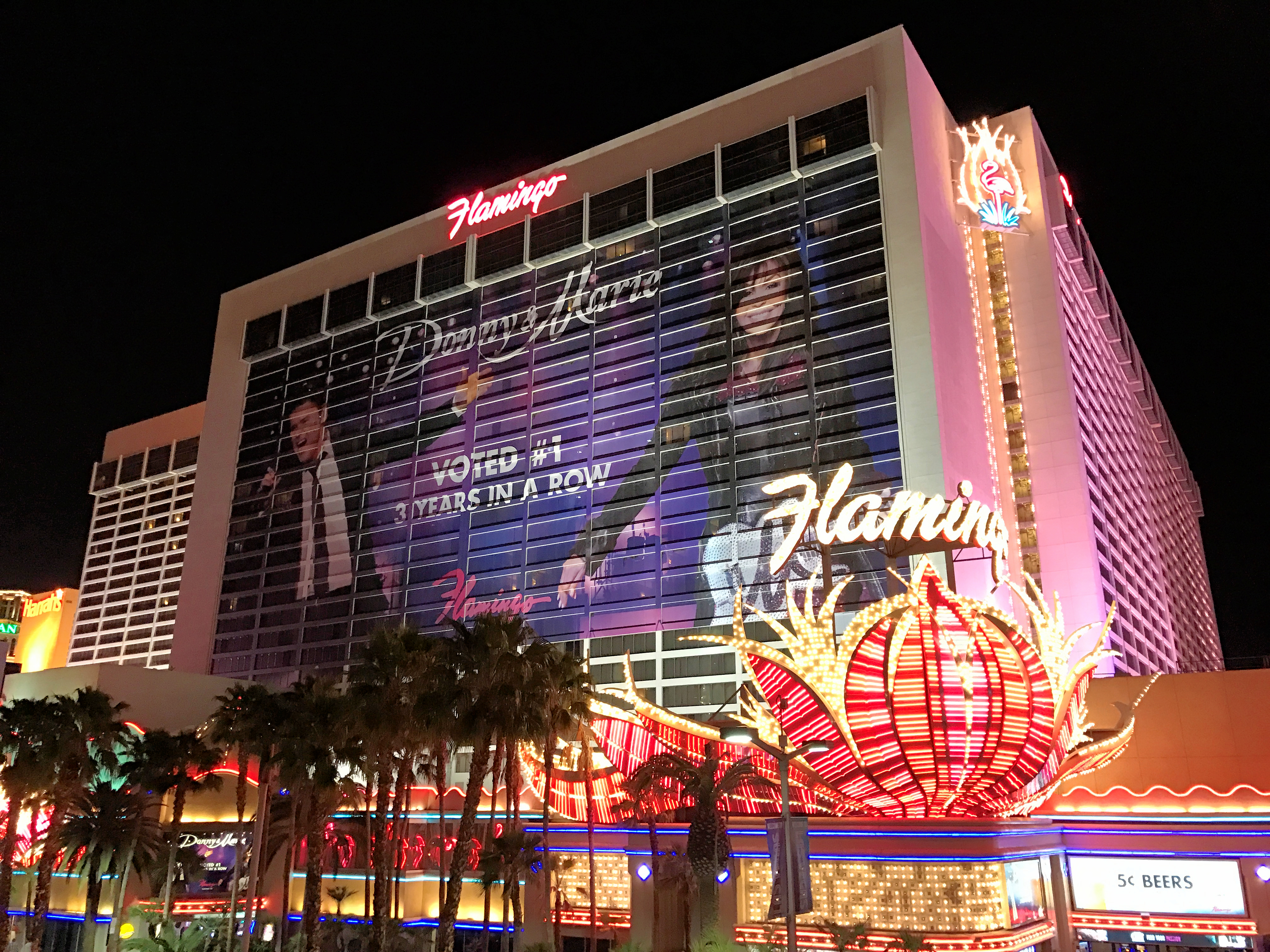
- Flamingo Las Vegas in 2017, advertising Donny and Marie Osmond's show at the resort.

- Location within Las Vegas Strip Location within Nevada
- Interactive map of Flamingo Las Vegas
- Location: Paradise, Nevada, U.S.; 3555 South Las Vegas Boulevard; 36°6′58″N 115°10′14″W
- Opened: December 26, 1946; 79 years ago
- No. of rooms: 3,460
- Gaming space: 72,299 sq ft (6,716.8 m^{2})
- Permanent shows: Piff the Magic Dragon; RuPaul's Drag Race Live! Wayne Newton; X Burlesque
- Signature attractions: Wildlife habitat
- Notable restaurants: Bugsy & Meyer's Steakhouse; Havana 1957; Pinky's by Vanderpump; Category 10
- Casino type: Land-based
- Owner: Caesars Entertainment
- Architect: Richard Stadelman (1946); Max Horowitz (1952); Martin Stern Jr. (1967); Rissman & Rissman (1977)
- Previous names: Flamingo Hilton (1971–2001) (Note: Also known as the Flamingo Hilton Las Vegas after the opening of other properties, such as the Flamingo Hilton Laughlin in 1990.)
- Renovated in: 1953, 1967, 1978, 1980, 1988, 1990, 1995, 2001, 2004, 2012, 2018
- Website: caesars.com/flamingo-las-vegas

Flamingo Las Vegas (formerly the Flamingo Hilton) is a casino hotel on the Las Vegas Strip in Paradise, Nevada. It is owned and operated by Caesars Entertainment. The Flamingo includes a 72,299 sq ft (6,716.8 m^{2}) casino and a 28-story hotel with 3,460 rooms.

The resort was originally proposed by Billy Wilkerson, founder of The Hollywood Reporter, who purchased the land in 1945. Early the following year, he partnered with a trio of mobsters to obtain financing. Among his partners was Benjamin "Bugsy" Siegel, who proceeded to take over the $1 million project, to Wilkerson's dismay. Construction costs rose under Siegel's management, with a final price of $6 million.

The Flamingo's casino opened on December 26, 1946, followed by a three-story hotel on March 1, 1947. It is the oldest continuously operating resort on the Strip, and was the third to open there. Siegel was killed by an unknown shooter in June 1947, and numerous ownership changes would take place in the years to come.

Hilton Hotels Corporation bought the resort in the early 1970s, and renamed it the Flamingo Hilton, a name it would retain until 2001. The first 28-story addition was completed in 1978, and others would follow over the next two decades, with the final one finished in 1995.

The three-story hotel, the last remaining structure from the original Flamingo, was demolished in 1993, helping make way for the final high-rise addition. A portion of this property was also redeveloped as a new 15-acre (6.1 ha) pool area, accompanied by an animal habitat which includes flamingos. The resort has hosted numerous entertainers, including an 11-year residency for musical duo Donny and Marie Osmond that concluded in 2019.

== History ==
=== Land background (1944–45) ===
The Flamingo occupies property originally owned by one of Las Vegas's first settlers, Charles "Pops" Squires. In 1944, Margaret Folsom bought his 40-acre (16 ha) tract for $7,500. In 1945, she opened and briefly operated a small motel on part of the land, known as Rancho Aloha. Later that year, Folsom sold 33 acres (13 ha) of the land to Billy Wilkerson, founder of The Hollywood Reporter. He also owned three popular nightclubs on the Sunset Strip: Cafe Trocadero, Ciro's, and LaRue.

Wilkerson was a heavy gambler and a frequent visitor to Las Vegas. He bought the land from Folsom for $84,000; the high asking price had been the subject of dispute during negotiations. Rancho Aloha was demolished to help make way for a new casino resort planned by Wilkerson.

=== Bugsy Siegel ownership (1946–47) ===
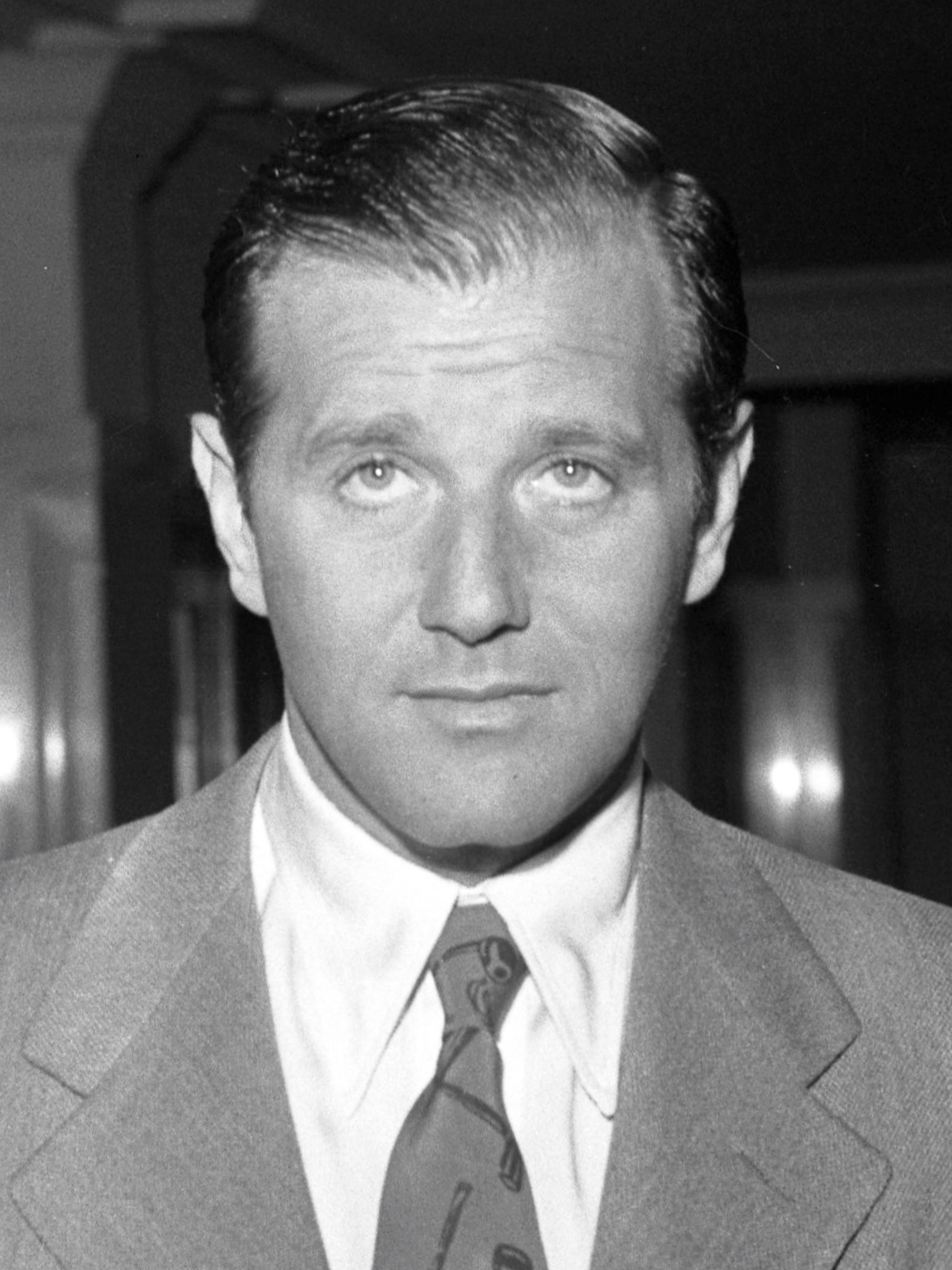
Bugsy Siegel in 1944

Wilkerson lacked the money to finance the resort project on his own. In February 1946, he received a $1 million check from G. Harry Rothberg, in exchange for a two-thirds interest in the project for his mobster partners. They included Moe Sedway, Gus Greenbaum, and another individual Wilkerson would meet in March 1946: Benjamin "Bugsy" Siegel. The trio were already involved in the El Cortez hotel-casino in downtown Las Vegas.

Construction on Wilkerson's resort project was underway by March 1946, shortly after the end of World War II. That month, the Civilian Production Administration issued a freeze order that prohibited new construction without its approval. This was done to conserve construction materials for veteran housing, although Siegel successfully argued that the hotel project had already begun construction prior to the order.

A few months after joining the project, Siegel made himself the on-site boss. With approval from mobster Meyer Lansky, an off-the-books financier, Siegel created the Nevada Projects Corporation. The company was formalized in July 1946, with the intent of building a resort to Siegel's specifications. Wilkerson was dismayed by this, and his relationship with Siegel soon deteriorated.

Originally planned as a $1 million resort, the project costs increased to $6 million due to mismanagement by Siegel. In addition to Lansky, Siegel would receive loans from other mafia figures such as Frank Costello. The resort was built by Del Webb Construction. The company's construction managers had a difficult time getting their pay, which prompted owner Del Webb to nervously ask Siegel for the money himself at one point. Siegel, in response, said, "You'll get paid, don't worry about it. We (mobsters) only kill each other."

Siegel was commonly credited as the project's original visionary until the 1990s, when Wilkerson's son set out to correct the record. Wilkerson's involvement is further chronicled in The Man Who Invented Las Vegas, a biographical book written by his son and published in 2000.

Historian Frank Wright of the Nevada State Museum and Historical Society said in 1996, "It was Bugsy who took over the building when Wilkerson ran short of funds. Bugsy finished it and opened it, so in a real sense, it was Bugsy Siegel's hotel." Hal Rothman, a history professor at the University of Nevada, Las Vegas, also considered Wilkerson's involvement "more of a footnote," stating in 2000, "He had an idea but he wasn't able to pull it off. The Flamingo he envisioned probably was very different from the one Siegel envisioned."

==== Flamingo name ====
By May 1946, the project had been named the Flamingo, although it is disputed as to whether Siegel or Wilkerson came up with that name. Mobster Lucky Luciano, in a purported memoir published in 1975 after his death, credited Siegel with the name. According to the memoir, Siegel had once owned an interest in Florida's Hialeah Park Race Track, which was known for its on-site flock of flamingos. Siegel purportedly viewed the bird as a good-luck charm. Lansky also supported this version of events. Another story says that Siegel named the Flamingo after his girlfriend, Virginia Hill, for her red hair and long legs. Hill would also blush with pinkness while consuming alcohol, further evoking a flamingo.

An early name, Hotel Wilkerson, was used prior to Siegel's involvement. Wilkerson's son stated that the Flamingo name was thought up by his father: "He had a particular liking for exotic birds and named several of his projects after them. After considering several ideas, all variations on exotic birds, he finally settled on the Flamingo Club. That was the main working title until Siegel entered the picture." Wilkerson's son attributed the claim to his father's attorney, Greg Bautzer. According to a 2013 biography of Bautzer, Wilkerson was inspired by prominent bars in New York such as the Stork Club and began thinking of birds, leading to the Flamingo name. Michael Green, a history professor at the College of Southern Nevada, said "The Flamingo name probably was Billy's, because he was modeling it along the lines of the Miami Beach hotels, and the flamingo idea was prominent down there."

==== Opening ====
Siegel debuted the Flamingo's casino on December 26, 1946. Opening ceremonies took place over several days, with various celebrities in attendance. Approximately 200 VIPs to the opening each received a hand-painted ceramic flamingo statue, gifted to them by Siegel.

The Flamingo was built on the Las Vegas Strip, known then as U.S. Route 91. It is sometimes credited as the first resort to open on the Strip, although it was preceded by two earlier properties: El Rancho Vegas in 1941, and Hotel Last Frontier in 1942. The Flamingo was, however, the first Strip resort to feature an upscale and modern design, in contrast to the western-themed El Rancho and Frontier. Of the three resorts, the Flamingo was the southernmost property at that time.

The Flamingo originally lacked a hotel, which was still under construction. The casino suffered financially because of this, as gamblers stayed at its two nearby competitors. The Flamingo's casino closed on February 6, 1947, to better coordinate preparations for the hotel section. The casino reopened on March 1, 1947, coinciding with the hotel's debut. Siegel forced Wilkerson out of the Flamingo less than three weeks after the hotel's opening, and Wilkerson rarely spoke of the property after that.

=== Early ownership changes (1947–1967) ===
Siegel was killed by an unknown shooter on June 20, 1947. Shortly after his death, Sedway, Greenbaum and mobster David Berman took possession of the Flamingo. Berman ran a skimming operation at the resort, on Lansky's behalf.

In July 1947, businessman Sanford Adler paid $3 million to purchase the Flamingo, which had been struggling financially. Adler and other investors soon formed a new ownership company for the resort, Flamingo Club, Inc., later known as Flamingo Hotel Corporation. In 1948, real estate developer Morris Rosen stated that he was contractually entitled to shares in the company, accusing Adler of withholding stock ownership. Greenbaum and other stockholders bought out Adler later that year, and the case between Adler and Rosen was settled.

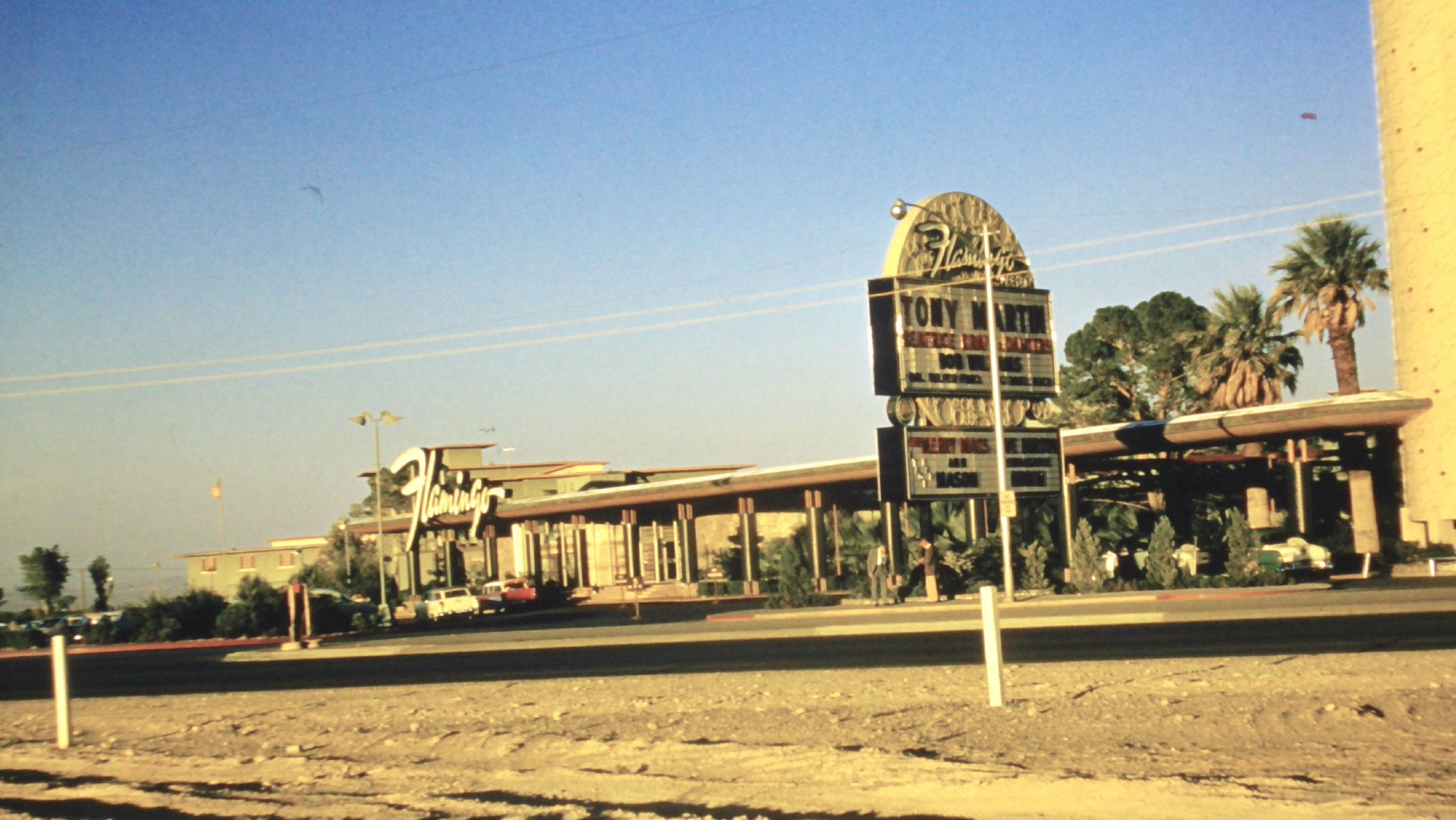
The Flamingo in 1957

From 1955 to 1960, the property was operated by Albert Parvin of the Parvin-Dohrmann Corporation. Parvin owned 30% of the stock while businessman Harry Goldman owned 7.5%; other investors included singer Tony Martin and actor George Raft.

In 1960, the Flamingo was sold for $10.5 million to a group including Morris Lansburgh and Daniel Lifter, Miami residents with reputed ties to organized crime. Lansky allegedly served as middleman for the deal, receiving $200,000. The ownership group held the Flamingo for seven years. Lansky, Lansburgh, and others involved in the Flamingo would later be charged with federal tax evasion relating to the resort's income, years after selling the property.

A Japanese business group, led by millionaire Kenji Osano, agreed to purchase the Flamingo in 1967. However, due to his foreign citizenship, Osano would have faced a protracted investigation period before he could obtain a gaming license. The sale agreement was soon terminated.

=== Later years and Siegel's legacy (1967–present) ===
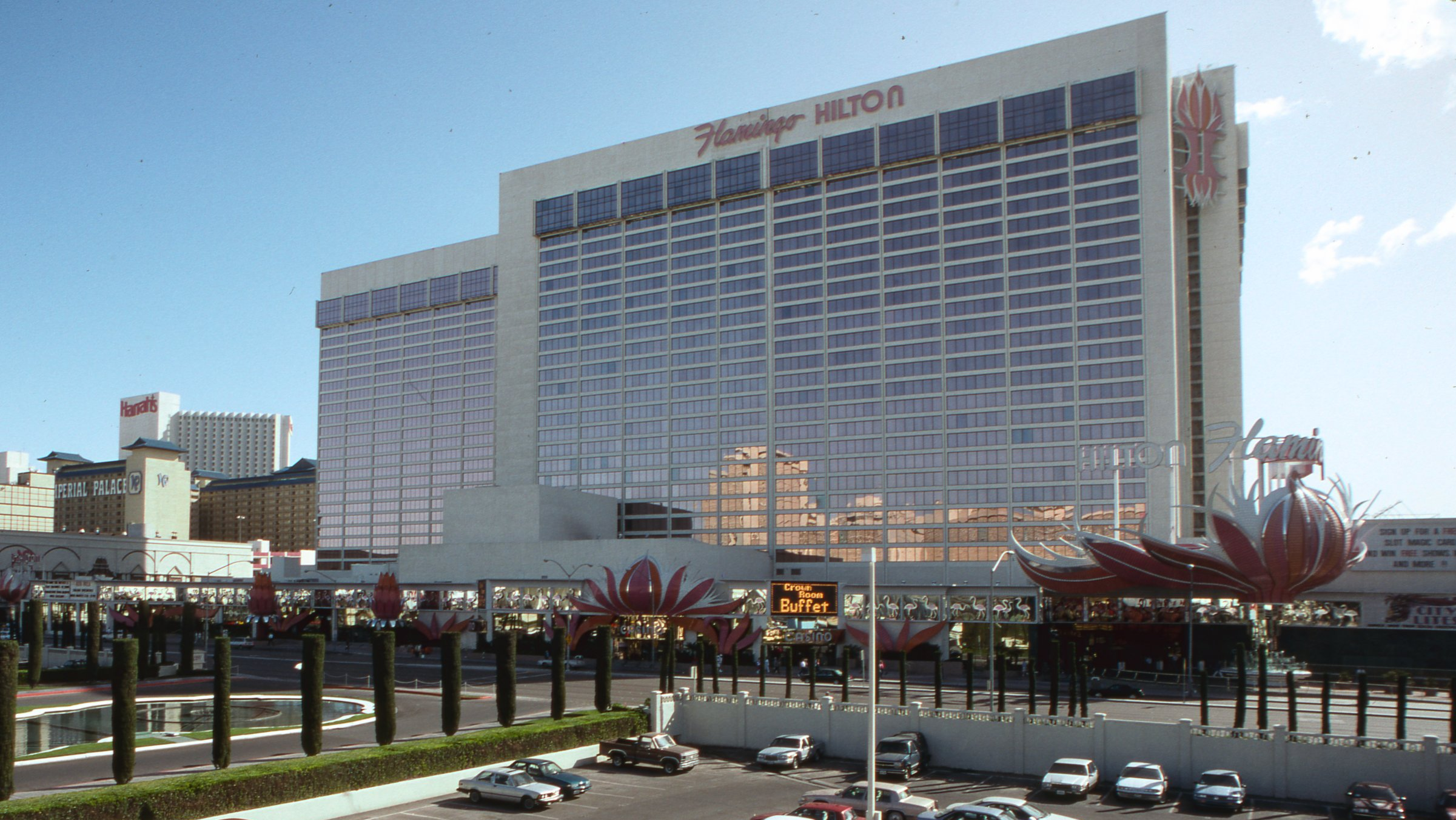
The Flamingo Hilton in 1993

American businessman Kirk Kerkorian acquired the Flamingo in 1967, making it part of his International Leisure Company. In 1970, Hilton Hotels Corporation bought a 44-percent interest in Kerkorian's company. The following year, Hilton increased its ownership stake further, and renamed the resort as the Flamingo Hilton. In 1972, Hilton bought out the remaining shares of International Leisure.

Hilton executive Horst Dziura served as the resort's vice president and managing director, and later became its president. He oversaw a transformation of the property during a nearly two-decade period, with various high-rise additions being made between 1978 and 1995. The original casino structure had been long demolished by 1991. The original low-rise hotel structure, including Siegel's on-site residence, was also demolished as part of the 1995 expansion, helping make way for a new pool area and animal habitat. A memorial plaque for Siegel was added to this area, and an entertainment venue was also named after him.

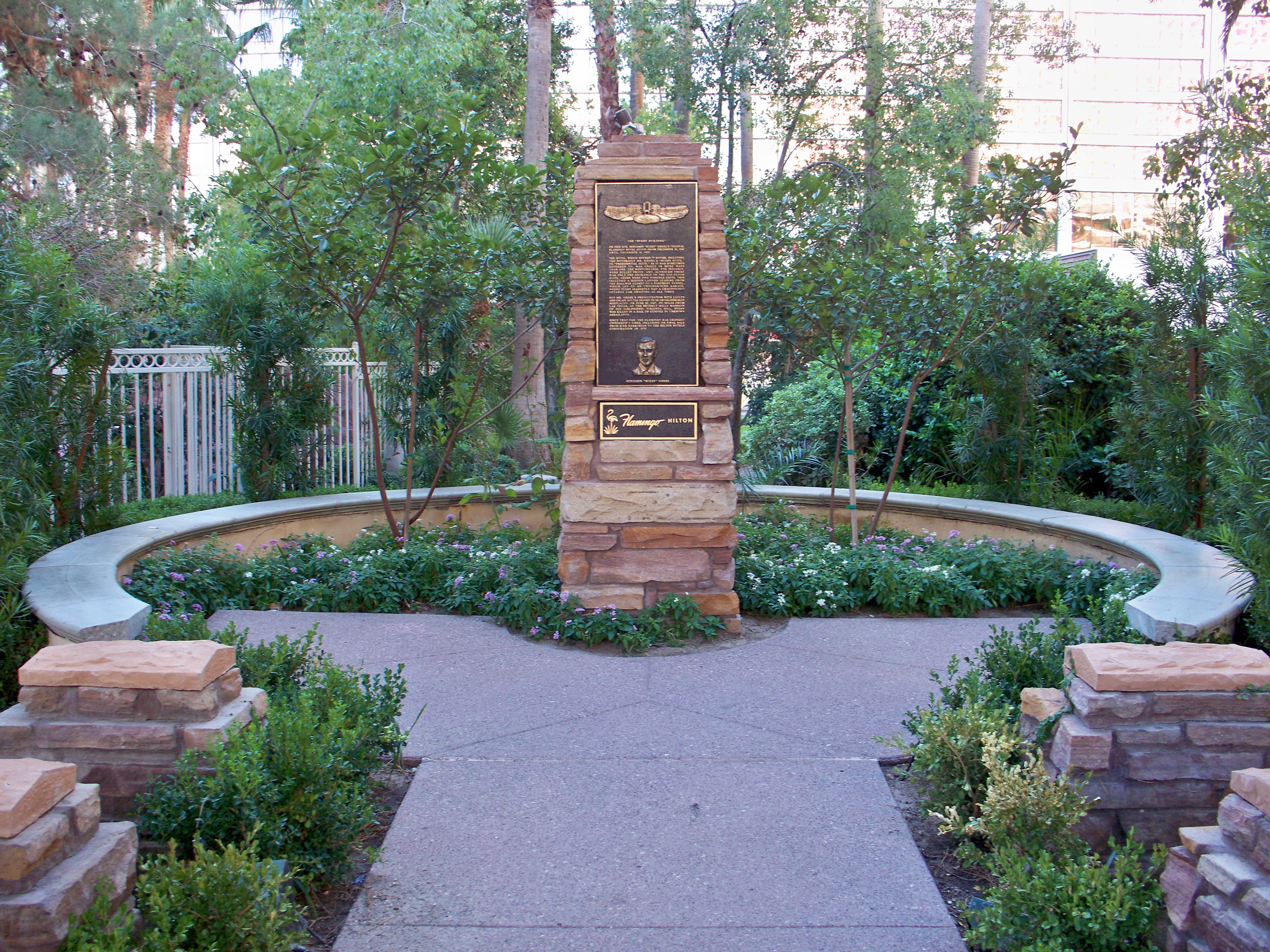
Bugsy Siegel memorial plaque in 2012

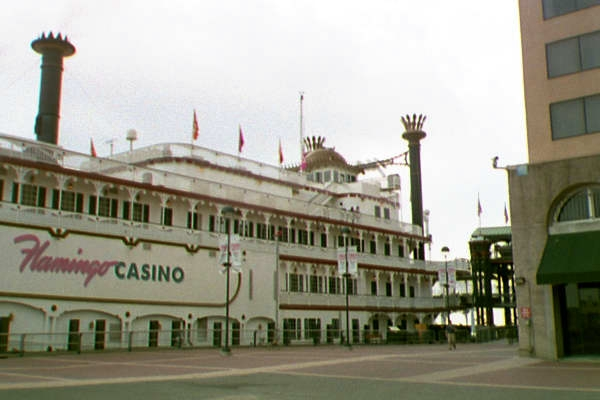
Flamingo riverboat casino in New Orleans, 1997

The 50th anniversary of Siegel's murder was not commemorated by the Flamingo Hilton, with a spokesman saying, "Although he was a founder of this property, he was certainly not a role model. We're talking about a murderer, thief and rapist—all the things that society shouldn't aspire to be." By 2000, the resort's employee dining room had been named Bugsy's Backroom Cafe. A steakhouse bearing his name would open to the public two decades later.

The Flamingo name has been applied to gambling operations elsewhere in Nevada, including the Flamingo Hilton Reno (1989), and the Flamingo Hilton Laughlin (1990). The name has also been used for riverboat casinos, including one opened in New Orleans (1994), and another one in Kansas City, Missouri (1996).

In 1998, Hilton's gambling properties, including the Flamingo Hilton, were spun off as Park Place Entertainment (later renamed to Caesars Entertainment, Inc.). The deal included a two-year license to use the Hilton name. Park Place opted not to renew that agreement when it expired in late 2000, and the property was renamed Flamingo Las Vegas the following year. In 2005, Harrah's Entertainment purchased Caesars Entertainment, Inc. and the property became part of Harrah's Entertainment. The company changed its name to Caesars Entertainment Corporation in 2010.

Australian footballer John McCarthy, of the Port Adelaide Football Club, died on September 9, 2012, after falling 30 feet (9 m) from a rooftop of the hotel. The incident occurred at the start of a post-season holiday for McCarthy and other Port Adelaide players. They had arrived in Las Vegas only a few hours before the incident. After reviewing evidence, police said that McCarthy had attempted to jump off the roof onto a palm tree, but fell to the ground.

== Property overview ==
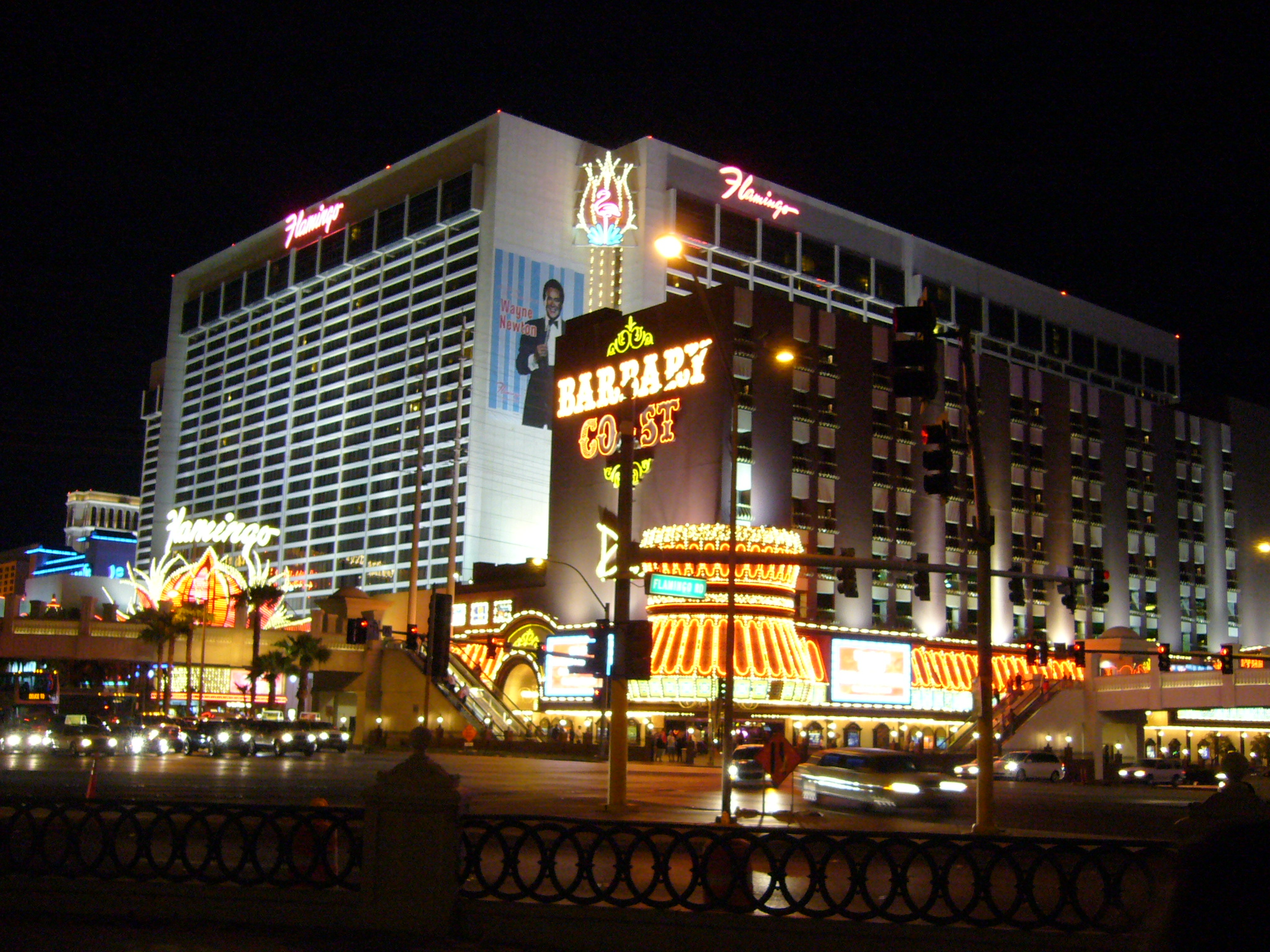
The Flamingo and neighboring Barbary Coast in 2006, as seen from Flamingo Road

The Flamingo occupies 19 acres (7.7 ha) at the center of the Las Vegas Strip. Flamingo Road, the nearest cross-street, is named after the resort. Although its original buildings have been demolished, the Flamingo remains as the oldest continuously operating resort on the Strip. As of 2005, it had more than 4,000 employees.

Wilkerson originally hired George Vernon Russell to design the project, although Siegel was not impressed with him and instead hired Richard Stadelman as architect for the casino, restaurant, and shops. The hotel rooms were designed by Tom Douglas.

The Sands resort opened on the Strip in 1952, and was considered more luxurious than the Flamingo, which began a remodeling and expansion project in response. Work concluded in 1953, increasing the casino, bar and restaurant space. The project architect was Max Horowitz, of the firm Pereira & Luckman.

A $2.5 million renovation was launched in 1967, under Kerkorian's ownership. The project included more gaming space, extending the resort to the sidewalk along the Strip. The casino floor was remodeled in 1992 to feature a wider array of colors, better complementing the resort's exterior. According to the project's interior designer Zoltan Kovacs, "The casino had none of the vibrancy or brightness of what we promised on the outside." A $130 million expansion took place from 1994 to 1995, enlarging the casino further. As of 2017, the Flamingo includes 72,299 sq ft (6,716.8 m^{2}) of gaming space.

=== Hotel ===
The Flamingo opened with 105 rooms. It was originally a three-story hotel, but included a fourth-story penthouse for Siegel, who oversaw construction of the on-site residence. Because he feared for his life, the suite included four-inch-thick concrete walls. He also had secret tunnels built into the residence, in the event that he needed to make an emergency getaway. After his death, the penthouse would be rented out to the public, and the original hotel structure would become known as the Oregon wing.

The first hotel addition came in 1958, with two buildings at the rear of the property. Designed by Douglas Honnold, they both were two stories and added 92 new rooms in total. In 1961, the Flamingo added 200 additional rooms in a four-story structure. The following year, construction began on another building with an equal height and the same number of units.

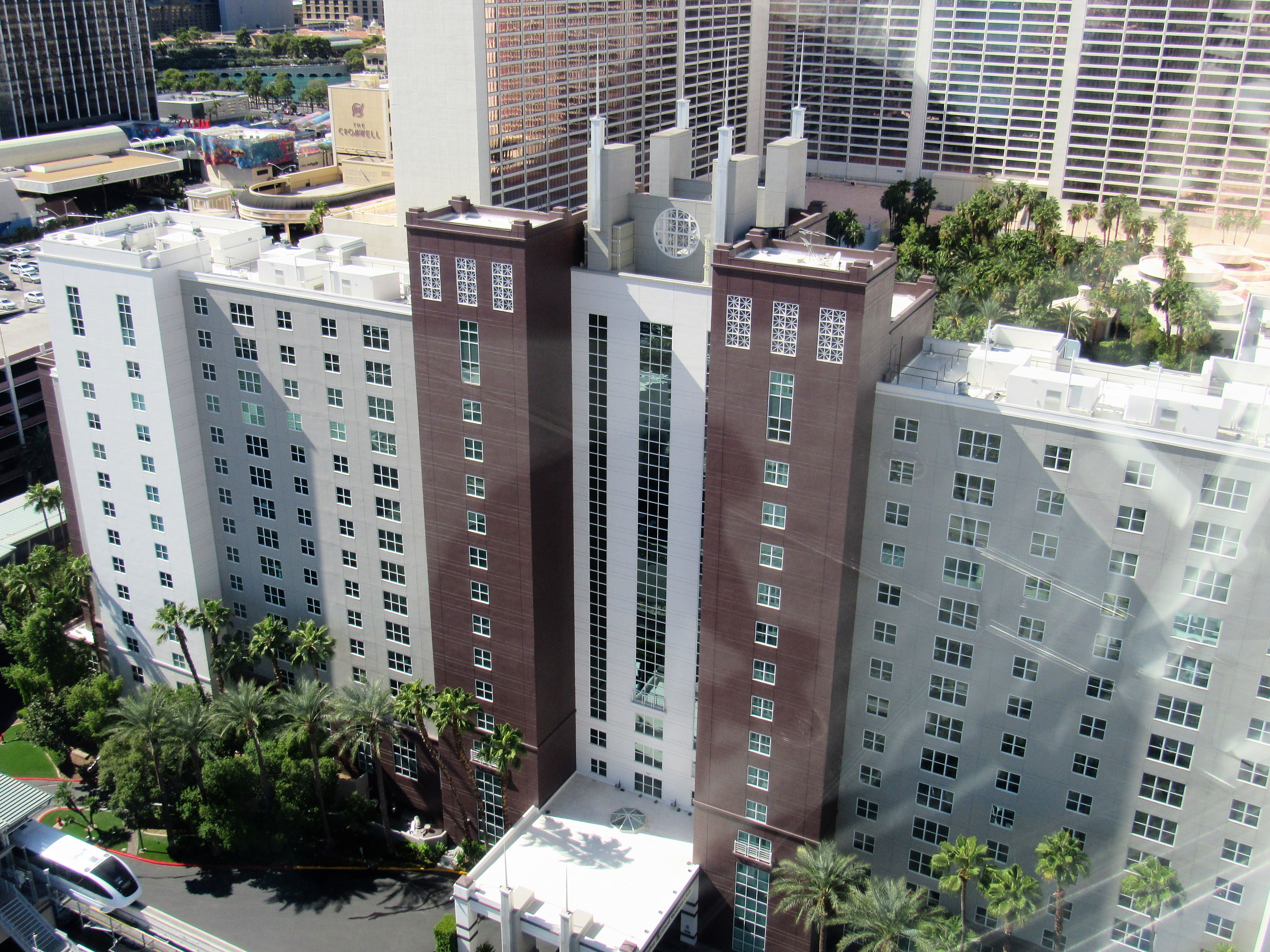
Hilton Grand Vacations timeshare tower, located behind the Flamingo

The first high-rise addition, rising 28 stories and built parallel with the Strip, was completed in 1978. An northward extension was finished two years later. By 1983, a third addition of equal height had been completed, giving the Flamingo Hilton a total of 2,250 rooms. This made it among the world's largest hotels. Two more additions, also 28 stories, were completed in 1988 and 1990; some of the property's older low-rise hotel structures were demolished to make way for the latter addition.

The final hotel expansion project required the demolition of the original Oregon wing. It closed on October 17, 1993, and was demolished two months later. The final high-rise building, with 612 rooms, was completed in January 1995. The high-rise additions were designed by architect Homer Rissman. A timeshare property, part of Hilton Grand Vacations, was also built on the Flamingo's rear acreage during the 1994–95 expansion. It includes a 17-story tower and two 8-story towers.

The Flamingo hotel includes 3,460 rooms. A 1,000-room renovation took place from 2000 to 2001, and 2,400 others were renovated in 2004. Another renovation of 2,300 rooms was completed in 2012, at a cost of $10 million. Further room renovations took place from 2017 to 2018. The designer, Forrest Perkins, used gold and pink in the upgraded rooms and described them as contemporary retro-chic with a focus on the 70-year history of the Flamingo.

=== Pool and animal habitat ===
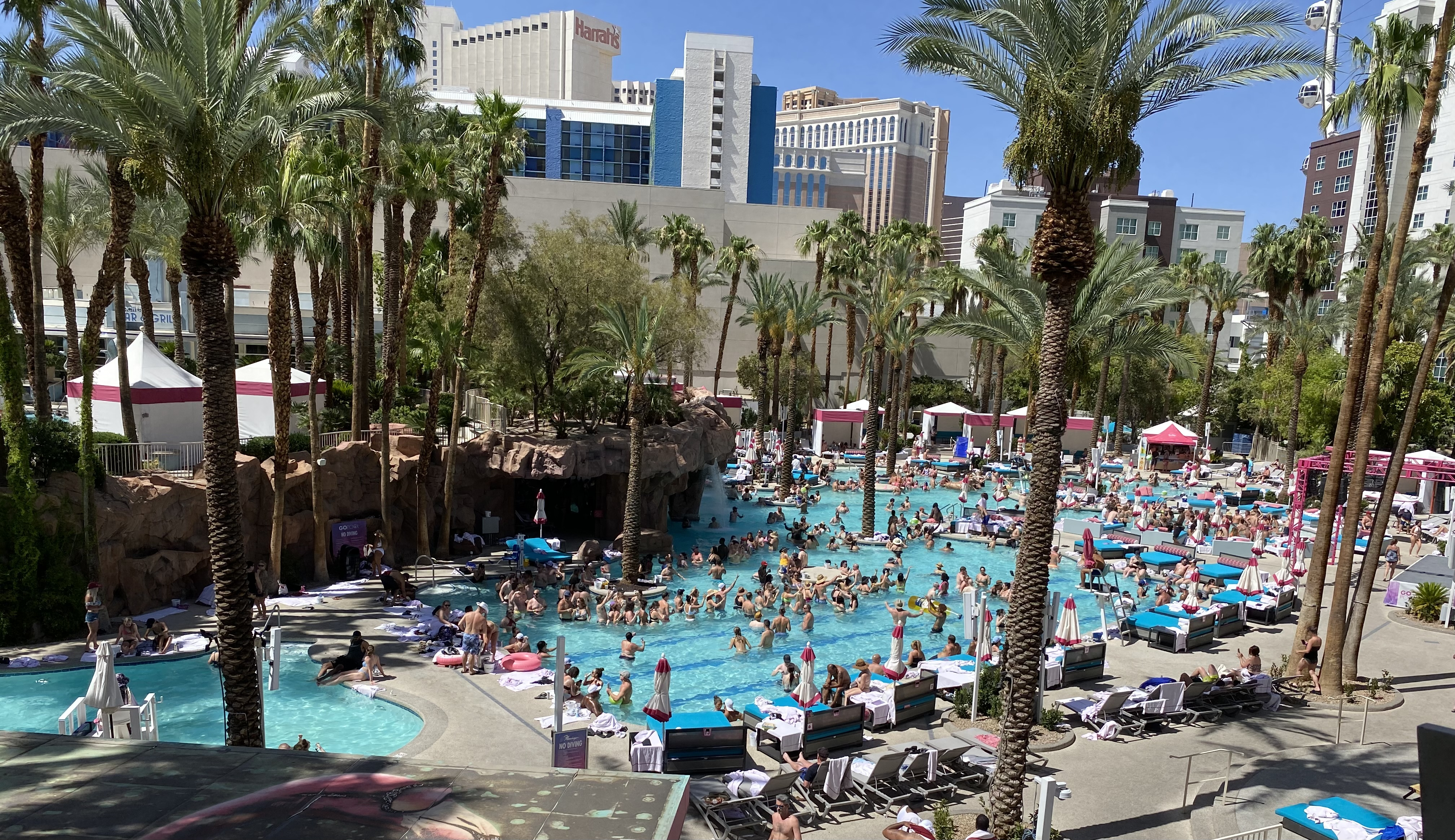
The pool area in 2022

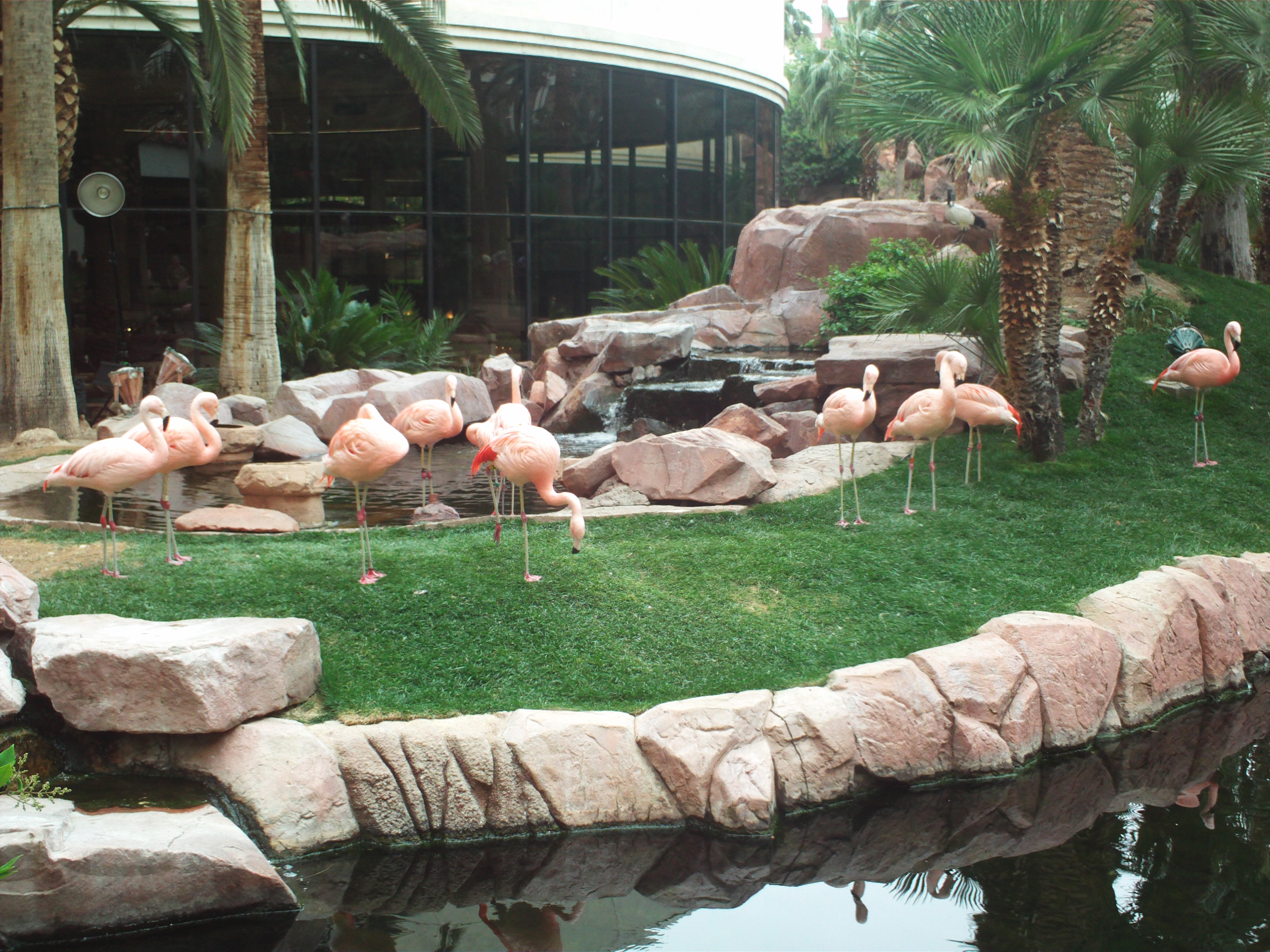
Flamingo habitat

Upon opening, the Flamingo included a pool area surrounded by tropical landscaping. A new tropical pool area, covering 15 acres (6.1 ha), was added in the 1995 expansion; it includes a free animal habitat attraction. Known as the Wildlife Habitat, it covers 4 acres (1.6 ha).

The Wildlife Habitat has featured numerous exotic birds throughout its history, such as Chilean flamingos, black-necked swans, and pelicans. It was also once the home of African penguins, but they had been moved to the Dallas Zoo by 2006. The Wildlife Habitat has also featured water turtles and various fish, including catfish, grass carp, koi, and white sturgeon. The habitat's animals are chosen based on their ability to adapt to the Southern Nevada climate.

The resort's pool area became one of the most popular in Las Vegas following a renovation in 1999. It has four pools, and offers a popular dayclub, known as Go Pool, which includes DJ music. The club launched in 2007.

=== Neon signage ===
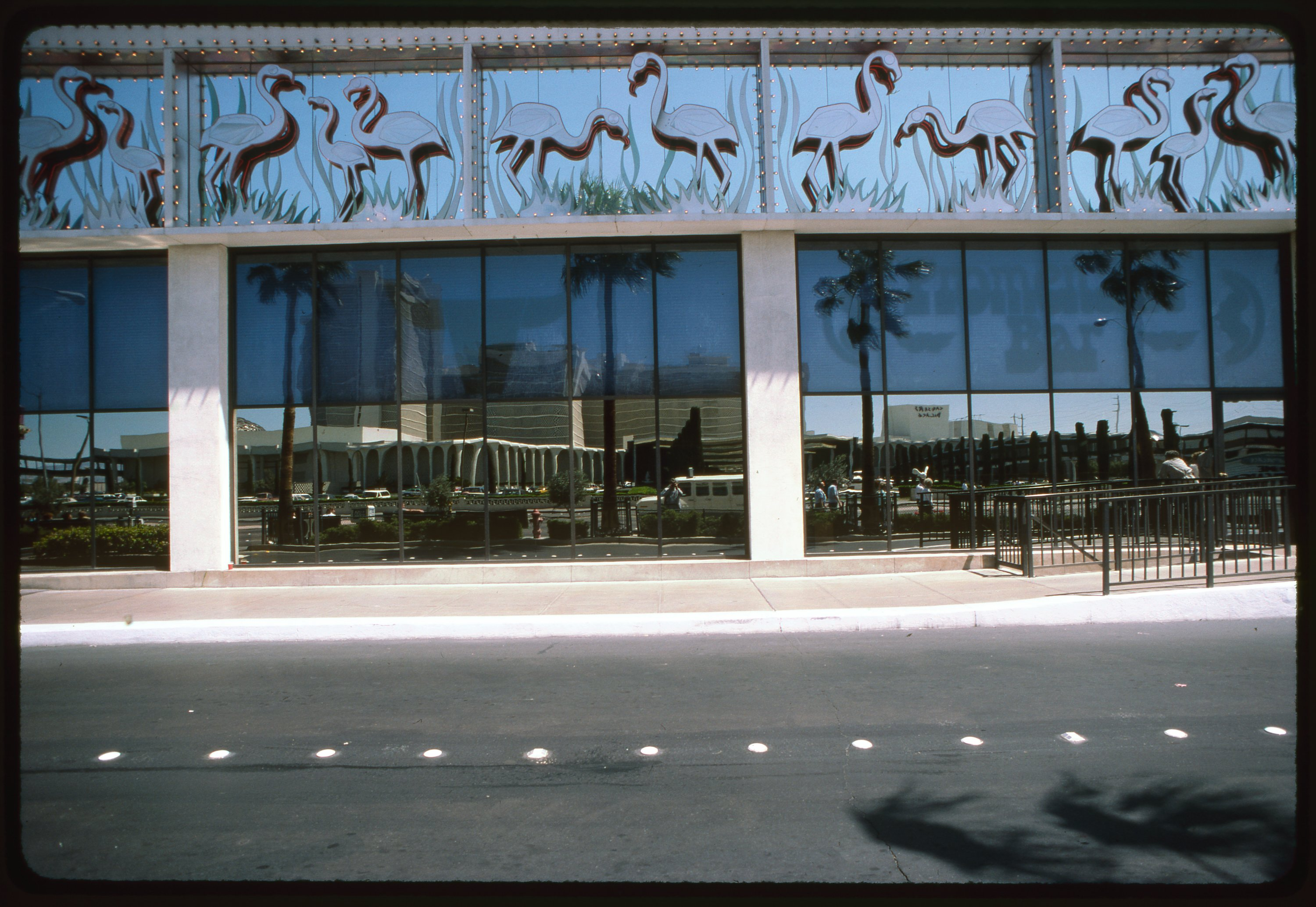
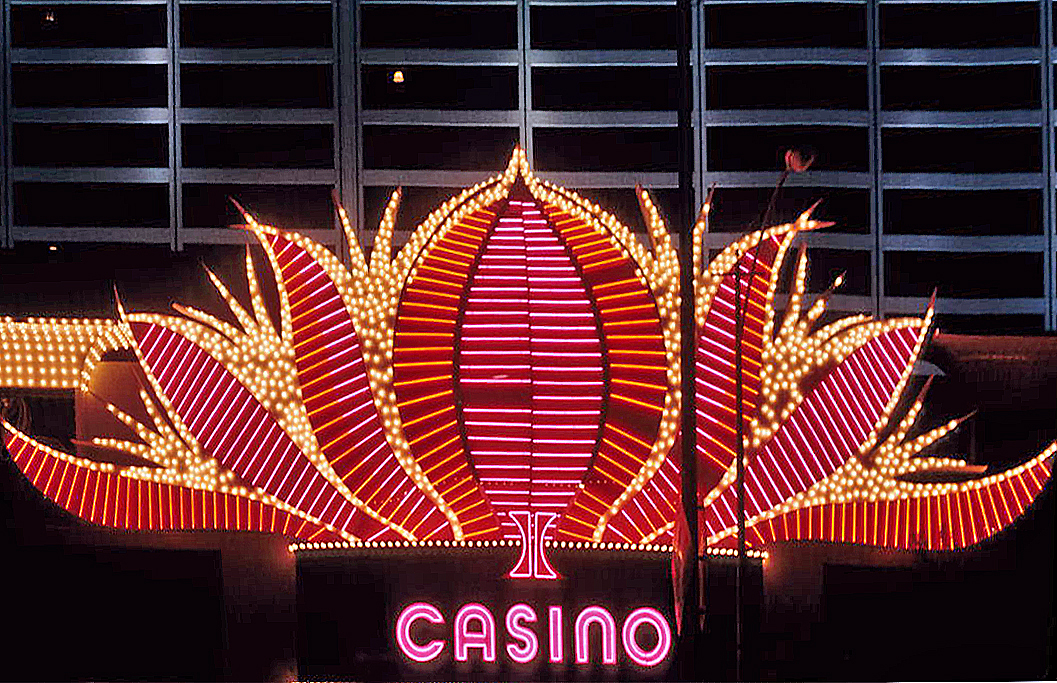
Neon flamingos and plumage in the late 1980s

The 1953 renovation project included the addition of a "champagne tower" along the Strip, featuring neon lights depicting bubbles. It rose more than 50 feet, and would remain as the tallest free-standing structure on the Strip into the next decade, eventually being eclipsed by a new sign installed at the Dunes resort in 1964.

The champagne tower was demolished in 1968, when a new roadside sign was added along the Strip. It was designed by Bill Clarke of Ad-Art. The 120-foot-high sign was torn down in 1989, to help make way for Hilton's new O'Sheas Casino. A smaller version of this sign, added during the 1980s, was present along Flamingo Road until 2002.

In 1976, Heath and Company was hired to revamp the facade with new neon signage, at a cost of $1.5 million. The project was overseen by Raul Rodriguez, a designer at Heath. Rodriguez initially struggled for creative inspiration, as the Flamingo lacked a theme other than its namesake bird, on which he would ultimately base his design. The project was completed in 1977. It included prominent neon signs depicting flamingo plumage, in addition to neon flamingos against a mirrored backdrop.

=== Other features ===
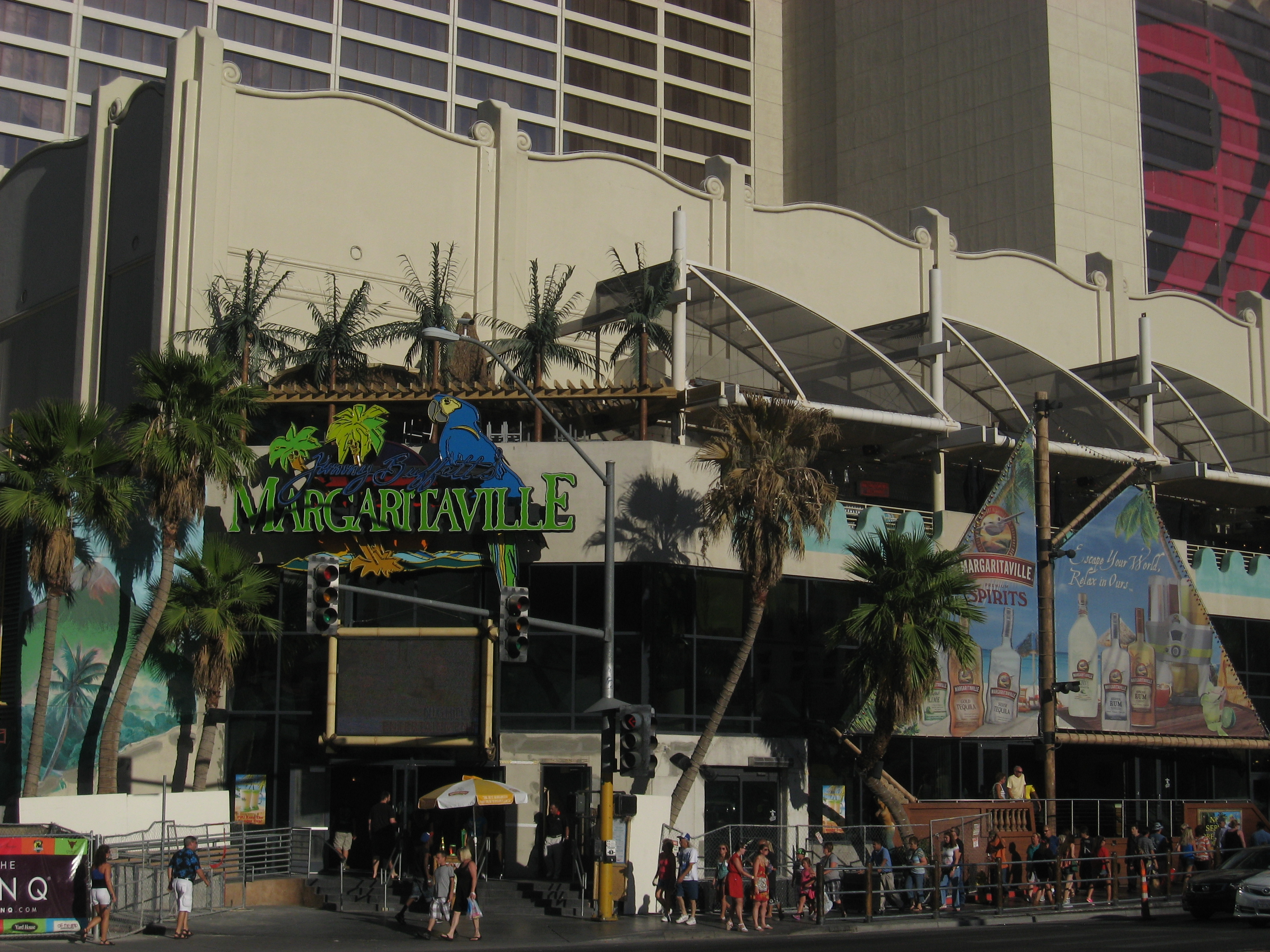
Margaritaville in 2013

For teenage visitors, the Flamingo added its 7-11 Club in 1960, named for its hours of operation during the evening. A convention hall was added the following year. The present-day Flamingo includes 73,000 sq ft (6,800 m^{2}) of meeting space, which underwent a $6.5 million renovation in 2017.

By 1988, the Flamingo had six restaurants, including a buffet. In December 2003, the resort added a Jimmy Buffett's Margaritaville restaurant and gift shop, located along the Strip. Its construction required the removal of two prior restaurants. An adjacent Margaritaville "minicasino", with 15,000 sq ft (1,400 m^{2}) of gaming space, was opened in October 2011, replacing Steakhouse 46. The addition cost $10 million, and featured 220 slot machines and 22 table games. The Margaritaville casino operated until 2018, and the restaurant closed, as planned, on May 30, 2024.

The 167-seat Burger Joint opened in 2010, and was replaced two years later by Center Cut Steakhouse. The latter closed in 2019, and opened a year later as Bugsy & Meyer's Steakhouse, named after Siegel and Lansky. It includes a hidden speakeasy-style bar.

Several restaurants debuted in 2024. Television personality Lisa Vanderpump opened Pinky's, marking her third restaurant on the Strip. Chef Gordon Ramsay opened his seventh Strip restaurant, Gordon Ramsay Burger. A Cuban restaurant, known as Havana 1957, was also added. It replaced a breakfast restaurant, the Tropical Breeze Cafe, which closed nearly a decade earlier.

== Live entertainment ==
Jimmy Durante, George Jessel, Xavier Cugat and Rose Marie performed on opening night, and the latter became a frequent entertainer there in the years to follow. Other notable early performers included Frank Sinatra, Martin and Lewis, Tony Martin, Lena Horne, Raphael, Mitzi Gaynor, Judy Garland, Louis Armstrong, and Della Reese. Wayne Newton became a headliner at the Flamingo in 1963, and had a residency there during 2006. He began another residency in 2022. Comedian George Wallace also entertained at the Flamingo during the 2000s.

In 1963, Bobby Darin recorded his live album The Curtain Falls: Live at the Flamingo, which went un-released until 2000. Bill Cosby recorded his third comedy album, titled Why Is There Air?, at the resort in 1965. Singer Tom Jones also recorded a live album there, titled Tom Jones Live in Las Vegas and released in 1969.

=== Flamingo Showroom ===
The primary entertainment venue is the 780-seat Flamingo Showroom. City Lites, an ice-skating show, opened there in 1981. The initial budget was approximately $1 million. The show proved to be popular, running until 1995. It was replaced by The Great Radio City Spectacular, a dance show starring the Rockettes and Susan Anton, which ran for five years. Bottoms Up, a long-running local show featuring topless dancers, debuted at the Flamingo Showroom in 2000, and ran for four years.

A show by songwriter Rita Abrams, based on the book Men Are from Mars, Women Are from Venus, had a 10-month run in the showroom, ending in 2001. Gladys Knight & the Pips played the venue from 2002 to 2005, and singer Toni Braxton had a show there from 2006 to 2008 titled Toni Braxton: Revealed, the show eventually closed due to Braxton's health problems.

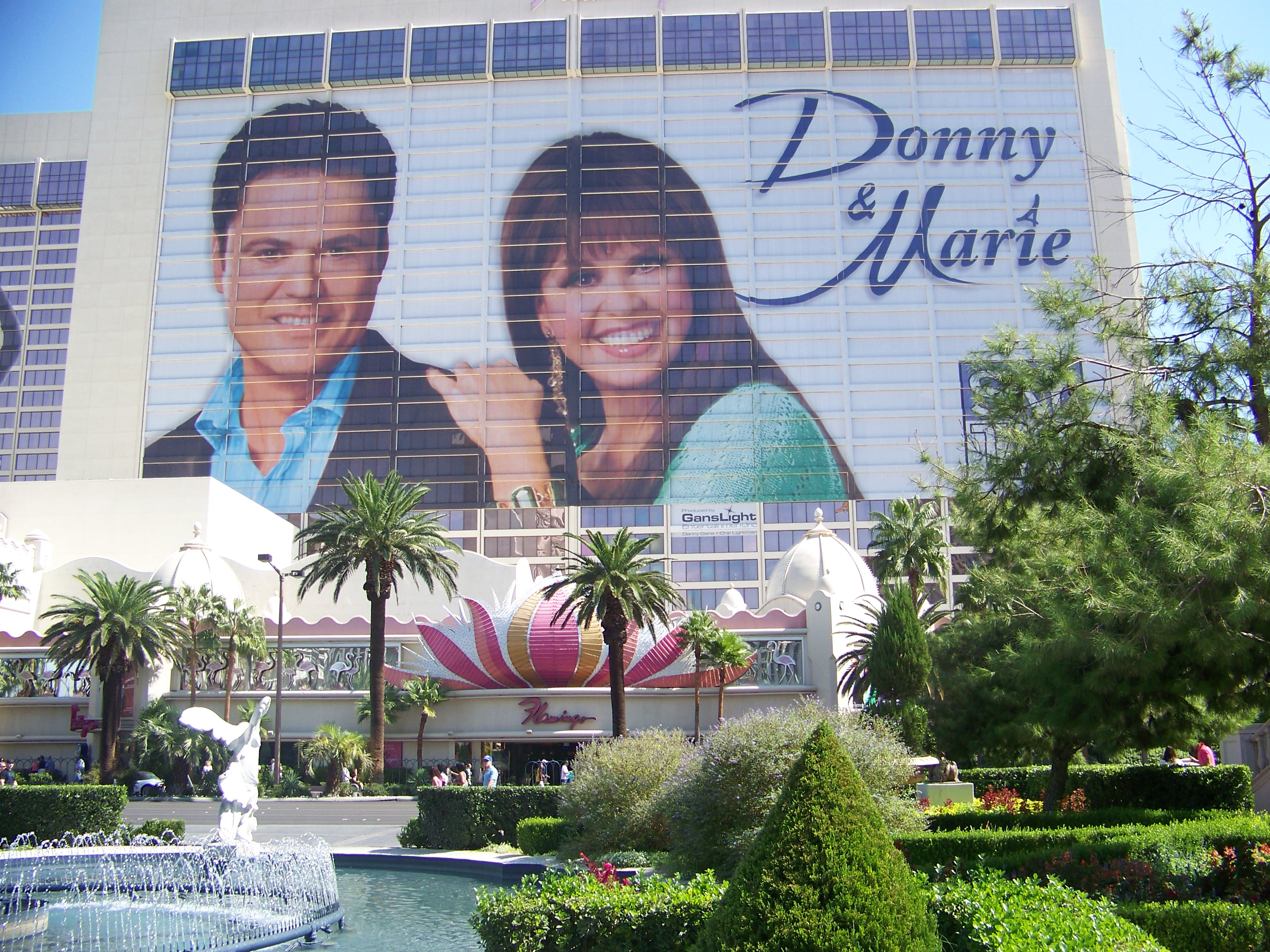
Advertisement on the front of the hotel for Donny and Marie Osmond in 2008

Brother-sister musical duo Donny and Marie Osmond opened in the showroom in September 2008, helping the Flamingo stay profitable amid the Great Recession. The show was originally intended for a six-week run, but was continually extended due to its popularity. After five years, the venue was renamed the Donny & Marie Showroom. They ended their residency in November 2019, after 1,730 performances.

Following the Osmonds' departure, the venue name was changed back to the Flamingo Showroom. RuPaul's Drag Race Live! debuted there in January 2020, featuring drag queens who once competed on RuPaul's Drag Race and RuPaul's Drag Race All Stars, including Aquaria, Derrick Barry, and Yvie Oddly. The show surpassed 700 performances in 2024.

Other residencies in the showroom have included singer Olivia Newton-John, whose show Summer Nights ran from April 2014 through December 2016. Keith Sweat began a residency in 2017, titled Keith Sweat: Last Forever. Paula Abdul had a residency from 2019 to 2020, with her Forever Your Girl production.

=== Bugsy's Cabaret ===
A 230-seat venue, Bugsy's Celebrity Theatre, was added as part of an expansion in 1992. It is named after Siegel, and was later renamed Bugsy's Cabaret. A musical, Forever Plaid, ended its six-year run at the theater in 2001, after more than 3,500 performances. It was replaced by The Second City, an improvisational comedy group with a rotating cast of performers. The Second City debuted in 2001, and ran for several years.

X Burlesque, featuring female dancers, opened at the theater in 2007. Piff the Magic Dragon, a comedic entertainer, has performed at the Flamingo since 2015, initially using the same stage as X Burlesque. The venue was renamed after Piff in 2019, until he moved to the main showroom a year later. Piff's sidekicks include showgirl and spouse Jade Simone, and a chihuahua named Mr. Piffles.

== In popular culture ==
=== Film ===
The Flamingo made numerous film appearances in its early years, including The Invisible Wall (1947), The Lady Gambles (1949), My Friend Irma Goes West (1950), The Las Vegas Story (1952), and The Girl Rush (1955).

In Ocean's 11 (1960), the Flamingo is one of five Las Vegas casinos to be robbed by the main characters. The resort also appears in a flashback sequence in the 2001 remake. Viva Las Vegas (1964) includes prominent footage of the Flamingo's pool area. The resort later appeared in Elvira: Mistress of the Dark (1988).

The 1991 film Bugsy, starring Warren Beatty, depicted Siegel's involvement in the construction of the Flamingo, though many of the details were altered for dramatic effect. For instance, in the film, Siegel originates the idea of the Flamingo, instead of buying ownership from Wilkerson, and is killed after the first opening in 1946, rather than the second opening in 1947. The film helped popularize the myth of Siegel as the Flamingo's true visionary. The original Flamingo was recreated for the film through sets, based on research such as historic photographs.

=== Television ===
The Flamingo Hilton appears in the opening montage of the television series Vega$ (1978–1981). The hotel-casino is also referenced in the series Lilyhammer (2012–2014), in which a nightclub in Lillehammer, Norway, named the Flamingo, is depicted as being inspired by the historic property. During its construction, the character Frank Tagliano directly cites Siegel and the Flamingo Hilton as his model for the nightclub.

=== Literature ===
Hunter S. Thompson and Oscar Zeta Acosta stayed at the Flamingo while attending a seminar by the National Conference of District Attorneys on Narcotics and Dangerous Drugs held at the Dunes Hotel across the street. Several of their experiences in their room are depicted in Thompson's 1971 novel Fear and Loathing in Las Vegas.

The Flamingo figures prominently in the 1992 novel Last Call by Tim Powers. In the novel, the Flamingo is supposedly founded on Siegel's mythical/mystical paranoia of being pursued and killed for his archetypal position as the "King of the West", known mythologically as "Fisher King". Supposedly the Flamingo itself was meant to be a real-life personification of "The Tower" card of the tarot deck.

== See also ==
- List of casinos in Nevada
- List of hotels in the United States
- List of largest hotels
- List of integrated resorts
- The Don CeSar
