= Charles Squires =

Charles Squires may refer to:

- Charles W. Squires (1851–1934), American architect
- Charles Pember Squires, Las Vegas businessman
