= List of awards and nominations received by Paula Abdul =

Paula Abdul awards and nominations
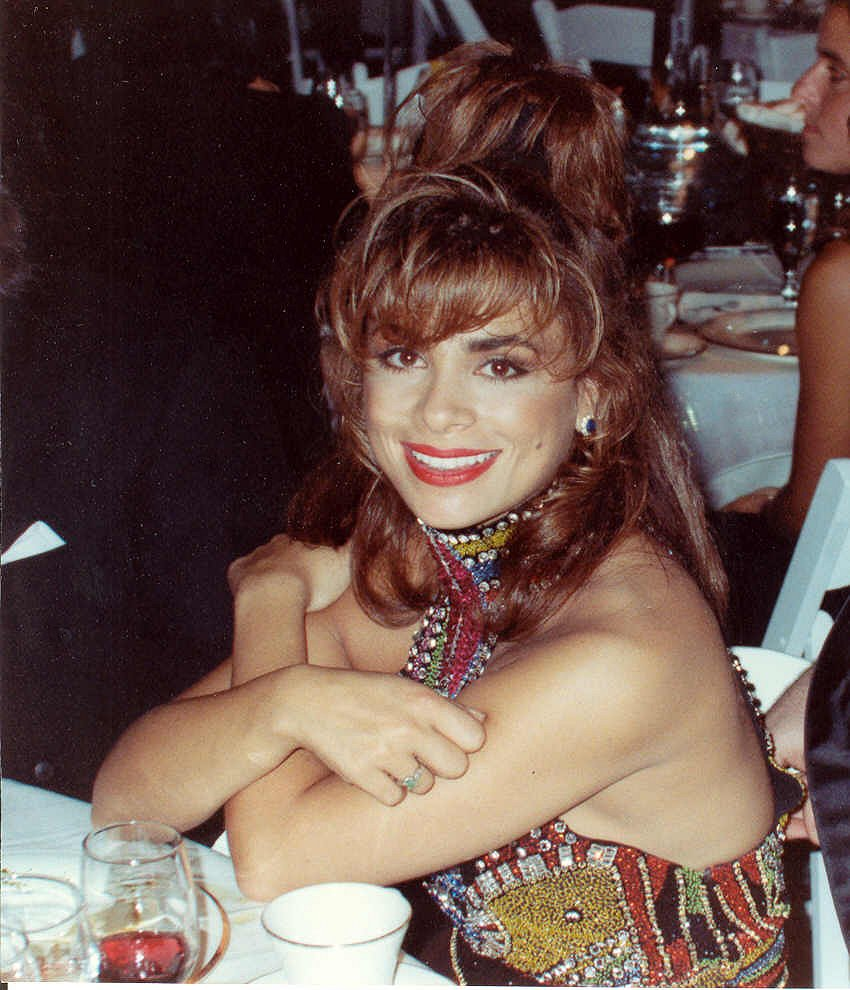
- Abdul at the 42nd Primetime Emmy Awards, 1990
Awards and nominations
Award	Wins	Nominations
American Music Awards	3	8
Billboard Music Awards	0	1
Brit Awards	0	1
Grammy Awards	1	2
Juno Awards	0	2
MTV Video Music Awards	5	17
Nickelodeon Kids' Choice Awards	2	2
People's Choice Awards	2	2
Primetime Emmy Awards	2	8
Soul Train Music Awards	0	1
Teen Choice Awards	1	3

Totals (Note: Certain award groups do not simply award one winner. They acknowledge several different recipients, have runners-up, and have third place. Since this is a specific recognition and is different from losing an award, runner-up mentions are considered wins in this award tally. For simplification and to avoid errors, each award in this list has been presumed to have had a prior nomination.)
- Wins: 40
- Nominations: 75

The following is a list of awards and nominations received by American singer, dancer, choreographer, actress and television personality Paula Abdul.

Abdul began her career as a cheerleader for the Los Angeles Lakers at the age of 18 and later became the head choreographer for the Laker Girls, where she was discovered by the Jacksons. After choreographing music videos for Janet Jackson, Abdul became a choreographer at the height of the music video era and soon thereafter she was signed to Virgin Records. Abdul's debut studio album, Forever Your Girl (1988), became one of the most successful debut albums at that time, selling seven million copies in the United States and setting a record for the most U.S. Billboard Hot 100 number-one singles from a debut album: "Straight Up", "Forever Your Girl", "Cold Hearted", and "Opposites Attract". Her second album, Spellbound (1991), scored the number-one singles "Rush Rush" and "The Promise of a New Day". She received 17 MTV Video Music Award nominations, winning five, as well as receiving the Grammy Award for Best Music Video for "Opposites Attract" in 1991. She received the Primetime Emmy Award for Outstanding Choreography twice for her work on The Tracey Ullman Show, and her own performance at the American Music Awards in 1990. Abdul was honored with her own star on the Hollywood Walk of Fame, and is the first entertainer to be honored with the Nickelodeon Kids' Choice Awards' Hall of Fame Award.

== Awards and nominations ==
Award	Year	Category	Nominated work	Result	Ref.
America's Dance Honors	1990	Choreographer of the Year	Herself	Honored	
American Music Awards	1990	Favorite Pop/Rock Female Artist	Herself	Won	
American Music Awards	1990	Favorite Soul/R&B Female Artist	Herself	Nominated	
American Music Awards	1990	Favorite Dance Artist	Herself	Won	
American Music Awards	1990	Favorite Pop/Rock Album	Forever Your Girl	Nominated	
American Music Awards	1991	Favorite Pop/Rock Female Artist	Herself	Nominated	
American Music Awards	1992	Favorite Pop/Rock Female Artist	Herself	Won	
American Music Awards	1992	Favorite Adult Contemporary Artist	Herself	Nominated	
American Music Awards	1992	Favorite Adult Contemporary Album	Spellbound	Nominated	
Billboard Music Awards	1990	No. 1 World Album	Forever Your Girl	Nominated	
Billboard Music Video Awards	1989	Best Female Video	"Straight Up"	Won	
Billboard Music Video Awards	1989	Best New Artists Video	"Straight Up"	Won	
Billboard Music Video Awards	1989	Best Editing	"Straight Up"	Won	
Billboard Music Video Awards	1989	Best Choreography	"Cold Hearted"	Won	
Billboard Music Video Awards	1990	Best Female Video	"Opposites Attract"	Nominated	
Billboard Music Video Awards	1990	Best Director	"Opposites Attract"	Nominated	
Brit Awards	1990	International Breakthrough Act	Herself	Nominated	
Choreographers Carnival	2013	Lifetime Achievement	Herself	Honored	
Ellis Island Medal of Honor	2019		Herself	Honored	
Fox Reality Awards	2007	Favorite Tears	Hey Paula	Nominated	
GLAAD Gala San Francisco	2019	Ariadne Getty Ally	Herself	Won	
Grammy Awards	1990	Best Female Pop Vocal Performance	"Straight Up"	Nominated	
Grammy Awards	1991	Best Short Form Music Video	"Opposites Attract"	Won	
Hollywood Christmas Parade	2023	Humanitarian of the Year	Herself	Honored	
Hollywood Walk of Fame	1991	Herself		Honored	
Impact Awards	2022		Herself	Honored	
Industry Dance Awards	2014	Icon	Herself	Honored	
Industry Dance Awards	2024	Paula Abdul Legacy Award	Herself	Honored	
Juno Awards	1990	International Album of the Year	Forever Your Girl	Nominated	
Juno Awards	1990	International Single of the Year	"Straight Up"	Nominated	
Los Angeles Music Awards	1992	Pop Album of the Year	Spellbound	Won	
MTV Video Music Awards	1987	Best Choreography in a Video	"Nasty" (by Janet Jackson)	Won	
MTV Video Music Awards	1987	Best Choreography in a Video	"When I Think of You" (by Janet Jackson)	Nominated	
MTV Video Music Awards	1989	Best Female Video	"Straight Up"	Won	
MTV Video Music Awards	1989	Best New Artist in a Video	"Straight Up"	Nominated	
MTV Video Music Awards	1989	Best Dance Video	"Straight Up"	Won	
MTV Video Music Awards	1989	Breakthrough Video	"Straight Up"	Nominated	
MTV Video Music Awards	1989	Best Choreography in a Video	"Straight Up"	Won	
MTV Video Music Awards	1989	Best Editing in a Video	"Straight Up"	Won	
MTV Video Music Awards	1990	Best Female Video	"Opposites Attract"	Nominated	
MTV Video Music Awards	1990	Best Dance Video	"Opposites Attract"	Nominated	
MTV Video Music Awards	1990	Breakthrough Video	"Opposites Attract"	Nominated	
MTV Video Music Awards	1990	Best Direction in a Video	"Opposites Attract"	Nominated	
MTV Video Music Awards	1990	Best Choreography in a Video	"Opposites Attract"	Nominated	
MTV Video Music Awards	1990	Best Special Effects in a Video	"Opposites Attract"	Nominated	
MTV Video Music Awards	1991	Best Female Video	"Rush Rush"	Nominated	
MTV Video Music Awards	1995	Best Dance Video	"My Love Is for Real"	Nominated	
MTV Video Music Awards	1995	Best Choreography in a Video	"My Love Is for Real"	Nominated	
Music Business Association	2017	Harry Chapin Memorial Humanitarian	Herself	Won	
National Eating Disorders Association	2005	Profiles in Living	Herself	Honored	
Nevada Ballet Theatre	2007	Woman of the Year	Herself	Honored	
Nevada Equality Awards	2019	Ally Leadership	Herself	Honored	
NewNowNext Awards	2010	Always Next, Forever Now Icon	Herself	Honored	
Nickelodeon Kids' Choice Awards	1990	Favorite Female Musician/Group	Herself	Won	
Nickelodeon Kids' Choice Awards	1991	Hall of Fame	Herself	Won	
People's Choice Awards	1990	Favorite Female Musical Performer	Herself	Won	
People's Choice Awards	1991	Favorite Female Musical Performer	Herself	Won	
Primetime Emmy Awards	1988	Outstanding Choreography	The Tracey Ullman Show	Nominated	
Primetime Emmy Awards	1989	Outstanding Choreography	The Tracey Ullman Show	Won	
Primetime Emmy Awards	1990	Outstanding Choreography	The 17th Annual American Music Awards	Won	
Primetime Emmy Awards	2003	Outstanding Reality-Competition Program	American Idol	Nominated	
Primetime Emmy Awards	2004	Outstanding Reality-Competition Program	American Idol	Nominated	
Primetime Emmy Awards	2005	Outstanding Reality-Competition Program	American Idol	Nominated	
Primetime Emmy Awards	2006	Outstanding Reality-Competition Program	American Idol	Nominated	
Primetime Emmy Awards	2007	Outstanding Reality-Competition Program	American Idol	Nominated	
Queerties Awards	2024	Straight Up Ally	Herself	Honored	
Revel Dance Convention	2021	Revelation Icon	Herself	Honored	
San Diego Automotive Museum	2025	Titan Philanthropy	Herself	Honored	
Shorty Awards	2020	Best Celebrity	Herself	Nominated	
Soul Train Music Awards	1990	Best Song of the Year	"Straight Up"	Nominated	
Teen Choice Awards	2003	Choice TV: Reality Babe	Herself	Won	
Teen Choice Awards	2004	Choice Reality/Variety TV Star - Female	Herself	Nominated	
Teen Choice Awards	2005	Choice TV Personality - Female	Herself	Nominated	
World Choreography Awards	2025	Legacy	Herself	Honored	
YMA Fashion Scholarship Fund AMY Awards	2006	Leadership	Herself	Won	
