= Hey Paula =

Hey Paula may refer to:

- "Hey Paula" (song), a 1962 single by Paul & Paula
- Hey Paula (TV series), a Bravo network reality series in 2007 starring Paula Abdul
