= Straight Up Paula! =

2018–19 concert tour by Paula Abdul

- Tour by Paula Abdul
- Promotional poster for the tour
- Location: North America
- Associated album: Forever Your Girl
- Start date: October 18, 2018
- End date: June 7, 2019
- Legs: 1
- No. of shows: 25

Paula Abdul concert chronology
- Total Package Tour (2017); Straight Up Paula! (2018–19); Paula Abdul: Forever Your Girl (2019–20)

Straight Up Paula! was the second headlining concert tour by American singer Paula Abdul. The tour marks the singer's first headlining tour in 27 years, since her 1991–92 Under My Spell Tour. The tour played 25 concerts throughout North America.

== Background ==
On July 9, 2018, it was announced that Abdul would go on tour to celebrate the 30th anniversary of her debut album, Forever Your Girl (1988). Ticket sales started four days after the announcement. Abdul said that "It's been decades since I've done my own tour, but I had a great taste of what it's like being on the road last summer with the New Kids on the Block and Boyz II Men, and had a great time. It was just a real warm welcome and [it reminded me] of how it felt like when I was on the road constantly years and years ago".

== Critical reception ==
The tour received positive reviews throughout its run. Debra L. Rothenburg of Infocus Visions gave a positive review of the Staten Island show stating “Ms. Abdul at age 56 is a bundle of energy and she sings and dances and owns the stage the same as she did over 25 years ago.” Shaun Astor of Tahoe Onstage gave a positive review of the Reno show stating “Paula did exactly what she explained she had done throughout her career: persevered. And when it was all over, she stepped out of the spotlight and left a room full of people with ecstatic smiles on their faces.” Eileen Shapiro of Get Out gave a positive review of the show in Englewood, stating “The visual cascade was extraordinary, sequentially fascinating and vibrant.”

== Setlist ==
This set list is from the concert on November 25, 2018, in Lynn. It is not intended to represent all shows from the tour.

1. "(It's Just) The Way That You Love Me"
2. "Knocked Out"
3. "Singin' in the Rain"
4. "Opposites Attract"
5. "Cold Hearted"
6. "Rush Rush"
7. "Blowing Kisses in the Wind"
8. "The Promise of a New Day"
9. "Crazy Cool"
10. "Straight Up"
11. "Forever Your Girl"

== Shows ==
Date	City	Country	Venue
North America
October 18, 2018	Tulsa	United States	River Spirit Casino
October 20, 2018	Biloxi	United States	Hard Rock Live Biloxi
October 25, 2018	Windsor	Canada	The Colosseum at Caesars Windsor
October 26, 2018	Northfield	United States	Hard Rock Rocksino Northfield Park
October 27, 2018	New Buffalo	United States	Silver Creek Event Center
November 2, 2018	Lincoln City	United States	Chinook Winds Casino
November 3, 2018	Lincoln City	United States	Chinook Winds Casino
November 4, 2018	Reno	United States	Reno Ballroom
November 6, 2018	Modesto	United States	Gallo Center for the Arts
November 7, 2018	Santa Rosa	United States	Luther Burbank Center for the Arts
November 9, 2018	Temecula	United States	Pechanga Resort & Casino
November 10, 2018	Las Vegas	United States	Red Rock Resort Spa and Casino
November 11, 2018	Chandler	United States	Wild Horse Pass Motorsports Park
November 13, 2018	San Diego	United States	Copley Symphony Hall
November 16, 2018	Tucson	United States	Fox Theatre
November 17, 2018	Indio	United States	Fantasy Springs Resort Casino
November 23, 2018	Bethlehem	United States	Sands Bethlehem Event Center
November 24, 2018	Englewood	United States	Bergen Performing Arts Center
November 25, 2018	Lynn	United States	Lynn Memorial City Hall and Auditorium
November 28, 2018	Staten Island	United States	St. George Theater
November 29, 2018	Uncasville	United States	Mohegan Sun Arena
November 30, 2018	Norwalk	United States	Wall Street Theater
December 2, 2018	Oxon Hill	United States	The Theater at MGM National Harbor
December 5, 2018	San Antonio	United States	HEB Performance Hall
June 7, 2019	Los Angeles	United States	LA Pride

== Cancelled shows ==
List of cancelled concerts, showing date, city, country, venue and reason for cancellation
Date	City	Country	Venue	Reason
October 3, 2018	Morristown	United States	Mayo Performing Arts Center	Production issues
October 4, 2018	Lynn	United States	Lynn Memorial City Hall and Auditorium	Rescheduled due to production issues
October 6, 2018	Rama	Canada	Casino Rama	Production issues
October 7, 2018	Verona	United States	Turning Stone Resort Casino	Production issues
October 9, 2018	Staten Island	United States	St. George Theatre	Rescheduled due to production issues
October 10, 2018	Englewood	United States	Bergen Performing Arts Center	Rescheduled due to production issues
October 12, 2018	Westbury	United States	NYCB Theatre at Westbury	Production issues
October 13, 2018	Lincoln	United States	Twin River Event Center	Production issues
October 14, 2018	Oxon Hill	United States	The Theater at MGM National Harbor	Rescheduled due to production issues
October 19, 2018	Lake Charles	United States	Golden Nugget Lake Charles	Production issues
October 23, 2018	Bethlehem	United States	Sands Bethelem Event Center	Rescheduled due to scheduling conflicts
March 30, 2019	Orillia	Canada	Casino Rama	Unforeseen circumstances
