= Paula Abdul: Forever Your Girl =

2019–20 concert residency by Paula Abdul

- Residency by Paula Abdul
- Location: Las Vegas, Nevada, U.S.
- Venue: Flamingo Showroom
- Start date: August 13, 2019
- End date: January 4, 2020
- Legs: 4
- No. of shows: 23
- Website: Official website

Paula Abdul concert chronology
- Straight Up Paula! (2018–19); Paula Abdul: Forever Your Girl (2019–20)

Paula Abdul: Forever Your Girl was a concert residency by American entertainer Paula Abdul at Flamingo Las Vegas in Las Vegas. It began on August 13, 2019, with shows continuing through January 2020. In addition to singing and dancing to her greatest hits, Abdul told various stories of her career, including her role as a judge on American Idol. The residency marks the 30th anniversary of "Straight Up".

== Background ==
Abdul revealed Caesars Entertainment approached her to do a residency at the Flamingo while at an event by the Nevada Ballet Theatre in January 2019. Abdul announced the residency on May 1, 2019, the same day she closed the 2019 Billboard Music Awards with a medley of her greatest hits. Choreographers NappyTabs were the creative directors and producers of the show.

== Critical reception ==
Get Out! gave a positive review of the show stating "Each note she sang was a fascination, and each dance step she took was illuminated. Her show was the closest thing to magic." Billboard gave a positive review of the show stating "Forever Your Girl offers two-hours of back-to-back hits, a reminder to all in attendance just how many she has."

== Concert synopsis ==
The show begins with Abdul acting as choreographer from the audience, instructing her dancers in a kitsch and schtick routine. From there, she goes onstage for "Vibeology" and "(It's Just) The Way That You Love Me" and then talks about her greatest career moments, including choreographing George Michael's The Faith Tour, Janet Jackson's "Nasty" and "Control" videos and the film Can't Buy Me Love (1987). Her animated companion from the "Opposites Attract" music video, MC Skat Kat appears as a costumed DJ.

== Set list ==
This set list is representative of the November 30, 2019, show. It may not represent all dates of the residency.

1. "Vibeology"
2. "(It's Just) The Way That You Love Me"
3. "Crazy Cool"
4. "Straight Up"
5. "Opposites Attract"
6. "Rush Rush"
7. "Blowing Kisses in the Wind"
8. "The Promise of a New Day"
9. "Knocked Out"
10. "My Love Is for Real"
11. "Cold Hearted"
12. "Forever Your Girl"

== Shows ==
Date	Attendance	Revenue
Leg 1
August 13, 2019	—	—
August 15, 2019	—	—
August 16, 2019	—	—
August 17, 2019	—	—
Leg 2
October 22, 2019	—	—
October 24, 2019	—	—
October 25, 2019	—	—
October 26, 2019	—	—
Leg 3
November 26, 2019	—	—
November 28, 2019	—	—
November 29, 2019	—	—
November 30, 2019	—	—
Leg 4
December 17, 2019	—	—
December 19, 2019	—	—
December 20, 2019	—	—
December 21, 2019	—	—
December 23, 2019	—	—
December 24, 2019	—	—
December 27, 2019	—	—
December 31, 2019	—	—
January 1, 2020	—	—
January 3, 2020	—	—
January 4, 2020	—	—

== Cancelled shows ==
Date	Reason
December 28, 2019	Strep throat
