= Paula Abdul =

American singer and entertainer (born 1962)

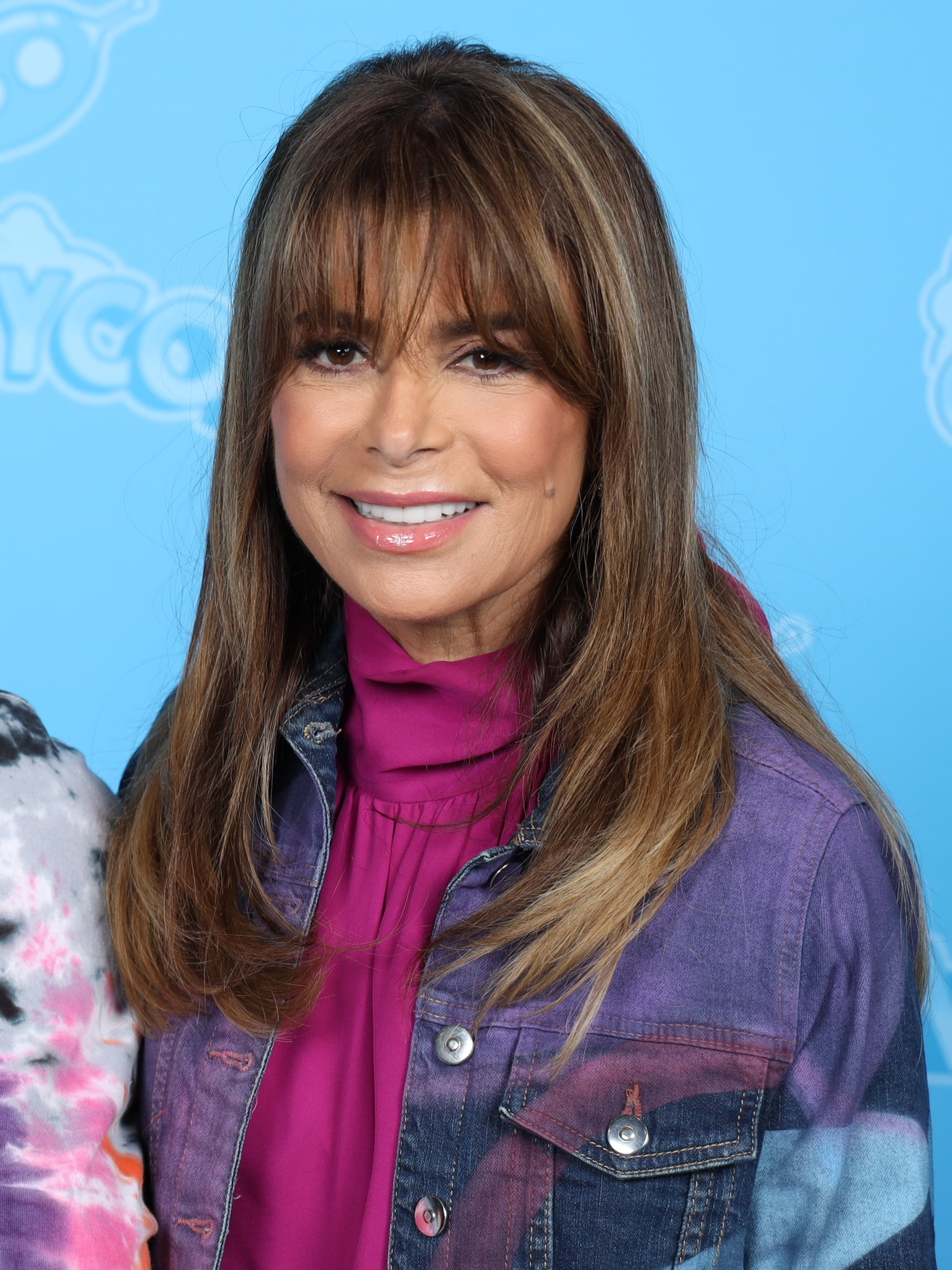
- Abdul at GalaxyCon Raleigh in 2023
- Born: Paula Julie Abdul; June 19, 1962 (age 64); San Fernando, California, U.S.
- Education: California State University, Northridge
- Occupations: Singer; dancer; choreographer; actress; television personality
- Years active: 1978–present
- Spouses: Emilio Estevez (m. 1992; div. 1994) Brad Beckerman (m. 1996; div. 1998)
- Awards: Full list
- Musical career
- Genres: R&B; pop; dance; new jack swing
- Instrument: Vocals
- Labels: Virgin; Captive; Mercury; Concord; Filament
- Website: paulaabdul.com

Paula Julie Abdul (born June 19, 1962) is an American singer, dancer, choreographer, actress, and television personality. She began her career as a cheerleader for the Los Angeles Lakers at the age of 18 and later became the head choreographer for the Laker Girls, where she was discovered by the Jacksons. After choreographing music videos for Janet Jackson, Abdul became a choreographer at the height of the music video era and soon thereafter she was signed to Virgin Records.

Abdul's debut studio album, Forever Your Girl (1988), became one of the most successful debut albums at that time, selling seven million copies in the United States and setting a record for the most U.S. Billboard Hot 100 number-one singles from a debut album: "Straight Up", "Forever Your Girl", "Cold Hearted", and "Opposites Attract". Her second album, Spellbound (1991), scored the number-one singles "Rush Rush" and "The Promise of a New Day". With six number-one singles on Hot 100, Abdul tied Diana Ross for the third-most chart-toppers among female solo artists at the time. She received 17 MTV Video Music Award nominations, winning five, as well as receiving the Grammy Award for Best Music Video for "Opposites Attract" in 1991.

Abdul was one of the original judges on the television series American Idol from 2002 to 2009, and has since appeared as a judge on The X Factor, Live to Dance, So You Think You Can Dance, and The Masked Dancer. She received choreography credits in numerous films, including Can't Buy Me Love (1987), The Running Man (1987), Coming to America (1988), Action Jackson (1988), The Doors (1991), Jerry Maguire (1996), and American Beauty (1999). She received the Primetime Emmy Award for Outstanding Choreography twice for her work on The Tracey Ullman Show, and her own performance at the American Music Awards in 1990. Abdul was honored with her own star on the Hollywood Walk of Fame, and is the first entertainer to be honored with the Nickelodeon Kids' Choice Awards' Hall of Fame Award.

== Early life ==
Abdul was born in San Fernando, California and is Jewish. Her father, Harry Abdul, is a Syrian Jew who was born in Aleppo, Syria, and raised in Brazil before immigrating to the United States. Her mother, Lorraine (Rykiss), was a concert pianist of Jewish origin, from Minnedosa, Manitoba, Canada. Abdul has an older sister named Wendy. As an avid dancer, Abdul was inspired towards a show business career by Gene Kelly in the film Singin' in the Rain.

Abdul began taking dance lessons at an early age in ballet, jazz, and tap. She attended Van Nuys High School, where she was a cheerleader and an honor student. At 15, she received a scholarship to a dance camp near Palm Springs, and in 1978, appeared in a low-budget independent musical film, Junior High School. In 1980, she graduated from Van Nuys High School. Abdul studied broadcasting at the California State University, Northridge. During her freshman year, she was selected from a pool of 700 candidates for the cheerleading squad of the Los Angeles Lakers NBA basketball team—the famed Laker Girls. Within a year, she became head choreographer. She remained with the Laker Girls until 1986.

== Career ==
=== 1982–1986: Career beginnings ===
Abdul was discovered by the Jacksons, after a few of the band members had watched her while attending a Los Angeles Lakers game. She was signed to do the choreography for the video to their single "Torture". Abdul recalled feeling intimidated by having to tell the Jacksons how to dance, stating that she was "not quite sure how [she] got through that." The success of the choreography in the video led to Abdul's career as choreographer of music videos, notably Janet Jackson's "What Have You Done for Me Lately", "Nasty", "When I Think of You" and "Control" videos. It was also due to the success of the video that Abdul was chosen to be the choreographer for the Jacksons' Victory tour. Abdul also choreographed sequences for the giant keyboard scene involving Tom Hanks's character in Big (1988).

=== 1987–1999: Forever Your Girl, Spellbound and Head over Heels ===
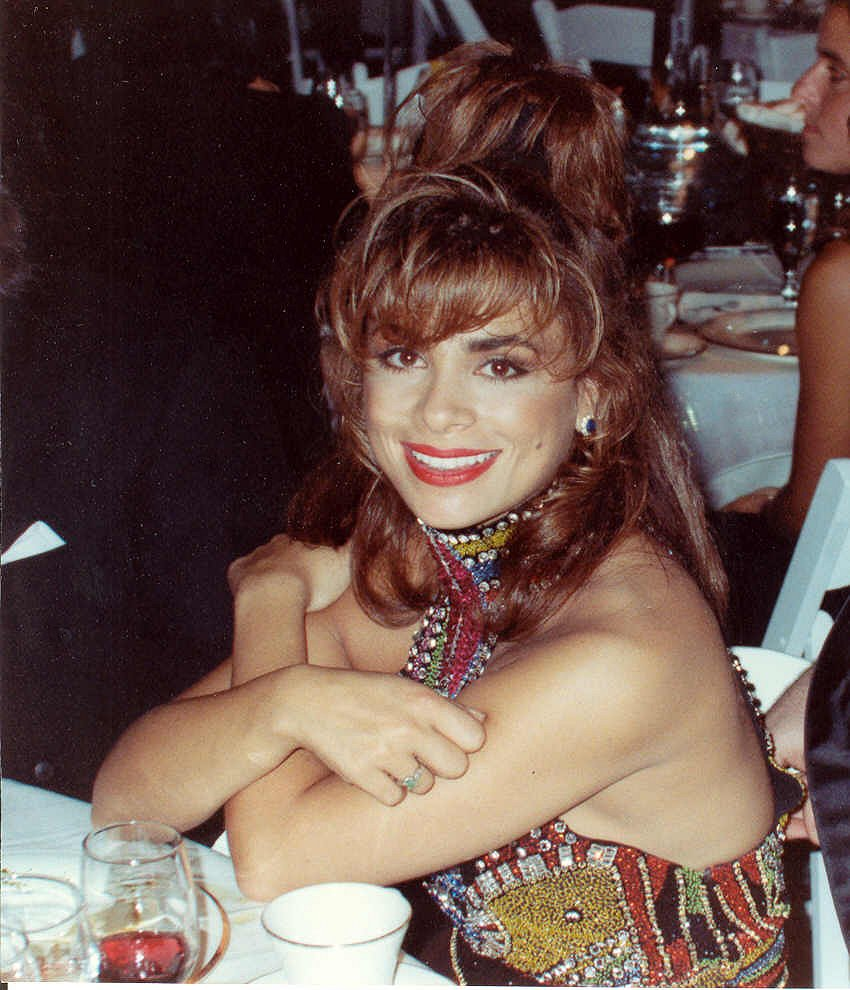
Abdul at the 42nd Primetime Emmy Awards, 1990

In 1987, Abdul used her savings to make a singing demo. Soon thereafter, she was signed to the newly formed Virgin Records America by Jeff Ayeroff, who had worked in marketing at A&M Records with Janet Jackson. Although she was a skilled dancer and choreographer, Abdul was a relatively untrained singer, and worked with various coaches and record producers to develop her vocal ability. She has a mezzo-soprano vocal range. Ayeroff recalled signing Abdul to a recording contract years later, stating: "She said, 'I can sing, you know. I want to do an album.' Paula's in our industry. Here's someone with a personality and she's gorgeous, and she can dance. If she can sing, she could be a star. So she went into the studio and cut a demo record and she could sing."

Abdul's debut studio album, Forever Your Girl (1988), would become the most successful debut album in history at that time, reaching number one on the Billboard 200 chart after 64 weeks (where it would spend 10 weeks at number one), and set a record for the most singles from a debut album to reach number one on the Billboard Hot 100 chart in the United States, with four: "Straight Up", "Forever Your Girl", "Cold Hearted", and "Opposites Attract". The album was later certified 7× platinum by the RIAA. A remix album, Shut Up and Dance: Mixes, was also released and reached number seven in the United States, becoming one of the most successful remix albums to date. At the 32nd Grammy Awards, Abdul won her first Grammy for Best Music Video for "Opposites Attract". She was also nominated for Best Female Pop Vocal Performance for "Straight Up", but lost to Bonnie Raitt's "Nick of Time". In 1991, singer Yvette Marine filed a lawsuit against Virgin Records (Abdul was not named directly in the suit), alleging that her lead guide vocal tracks were combined with Abdul's and passed off as one voice on at least two songs from Forever Your Girl, most notably "Opposites Attract". A jury sided with Abdul and the label two years later in 1993, rejecting Marine's claim to credit and copyright compensation.

Abdul saw continued success with her second studio album Spellbound (1991), which saw two additional number-one singles: "Rush Rush" and "The Promise of a New Day". A third single "Blowing Kisses in the Wind" reached number six for three consecutive weeks. Spellbound retained the dance-pop sound from Forever Your Girl and introduced elements of R&B, and sold 7 million copies worldwide. The music video for "Rush Rush" featured a Rebel Without a Cause motif, starring Keanu Reeves in the James Dean role. The album's other singles, "Vibeology" and "Will You Marry Me?", saw moderate success on the Billboard Hot 100, reaching the top 20. In 1991, Abdul starred in a popular Diet Coke commercial in which she danced with a digital image of her idol, a young Gene Kelly. Abdul was honored with a star on the Hollywood Walk of Fame in December 1991. Abdul promoted Spellbound through the Under My Spell Tour, which was named by an MTV contest for fans. The tour was nearly cancelled due to an accident during rehearsals, but began on schedule in October 1991 and concluded in August 1992.

After her initial period of professional success, Abdul's career entered a brief hiatus while she sought treatment for personal and physical issues. Her third studio album, Head over Heels (1995), retained both pop and R&B elements and saw moderate commercial success, peaking at number 18 on the Billboard 200 chart in the United States and later becoming her lowest-selling release. The lead single from Head over Heels, "My Love Is for Real", featured a fusion of R&B and traditional Middle Eastern instruments, and was performed with Yemeni-Israeli singer Ofra Haza. Its accompanying Lawrence of Arabia-inspired music video was played in theaters across the world as a prologue to the film Clueless. The single performed well on the Billboard Hot Dance Music/Club Play chart, where it reached number one, and peaked at number 28 on the Billboard Hot 100. "Crazy Cool" and "Ain't Never Gonna Give You Up" served as the album's second and third singles. To date, Head over Heels has sold over 500,000 copies in the United States. In 1995, Abdul released a dance workout video entitled Paula Abdul's Get Up and Dance! (re-released on DVD in 2003), a fast-paced, hip-hop style workout. In 1997, Abdul co-wrote a song called "Spinning Around" with record producer and composer Kara DioGuardi, which was intended to be her comeback single from a new album, but the plan never materialized and the song was later given to Kylie Minogue. That year, Abdul appeared in the ABC television film Touched By Evil, playing a businesswoman who discovers that her boyfriend is a serial rapist. In 1998, she released a second workout video called Cardio Dance (re-released on DVD in 2000). Thereafter, Abdul served as the choreographer for several film and theater productions, including the 1998 musical Reefer Madness and the cheerleading scenes in American Beauty (1999).

=== 2000–2009: American Idol, Hey Paula and return to music ===
In 2000, Virgin Records, with whom Abdul was already no longer affiliated, released the first of two compilation albums by Abdul, Paula Abdul: Greatest Hits. Abdul co-produced the 2001 pilot for Skirts, an MTV television series about a high school cheerleading squad; Abdul was also set to appear as the head coach. The pilot never aired. In 2002, she began appearing as one of three judges on the Fox reality competition series American Idol, where she won praise as a sympathetic and compassionate judge and mentor. She seemed especially kind compared to fellow judge Simon Cowell, who was often blunt in his appraisals of the contestants' performances. When she realized that Cowell's over-the-top judging style was heartbreaking for many young contestants, Abdul was horrified and she considered leaving the series. Although their differences often resulted in heated on-air exchanges and confrontations, Cowell says he played a major role in convincing Abdul not to leave the series. While serving as a judge on American Idol, Abdul accepted a second assignment as reporter for Entertainment Tonight. In December 2005, Abdul launched a cheerleading/fitness/dance DVD series called Cardio Cheer, which is marketed to children and teenage girls involved with cheerleading and dance. Abdul also choreographed The King's touchdown celebration, as seen in a string of Burger King television commercials that aired during the 2005–06 NFL season. In 2006, Abdul appeared on the third series of The X Factor UK as a guest judge during the auditions, sitting alongside judges Cowell, Sharon Osbourne and Louis Walsh.

A second compilation album, Greatest Hits: Straight Up!, was released in 2007 by the Virgin label, who also made all of Abdul's releases under their label available for digital download on iTunes. That year, Bravo began airing a reality television series centered around Abdul, Hey Paula, which followed her through her day-to-day life. Abdul's behavior as depicted on the series was described as "erratic" by comedian Rosie O'Donnell and was criticized by audiences and critics, and Hey Paula was cancelled after a single season.

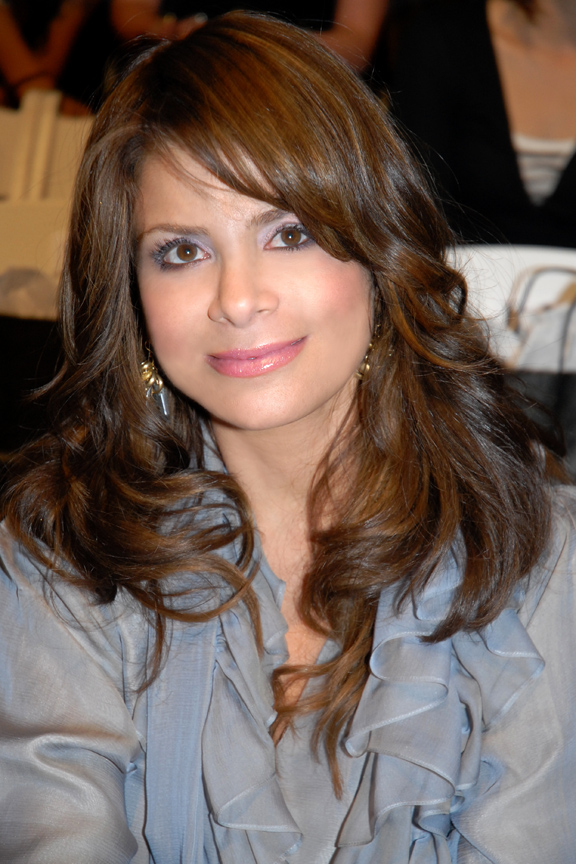
Abdul at the Los Angeles Fashion Week at Smashbox Studios in March 2007

In 2007, Paula Abdul Jewelry launched its nationwide consumer debut on QVC, with the tagline "fashion jewelry designed with heart and soul." Abdul's first QVC appearance resulted in 15 sellouts of her first jewelry collection involving more than 34,000 pieces. In 2008, Abdul returned to music charts for the first time in nearly thirteen years with the single "Dance Like There's No Tomorrow", the first track on the album Randy Jackson's Music Club Vol. 1. The song debuted on On Air with Ryan Seacrest, and Abdul performed it during the pre-game show for Super Bowl XLII. "Dance Like There's No Tomorrow" was a modest comeback hit for Abdul, peaking at number 62 on the Billboard Hot 100 and number 2 on the Billboard Hot Dance Music/Club Play chart. The moderate success led to reports of Abdul beginning work on a new album, but this never materialized. Abdul also made a brief guest appearance on an episode of the British television series Hotel Babylon, which aired in the United Kingdom in February 2008.

In January 2009, Abdul hosted "RAH!," a cheerleading competition on MTV. "RAH!" featured five collegiate squads competing in a series of challenges with Abdul crowning one the winner. In May 2009, Abdul debuted her latest original song to date, "I'm Just Here for the Music" (originally an unreleased song from Kylie Minogue's ninth album Body Language) on the Ryan Seacrest Radio KIIS-FM show and performed the single on the American Idol. "I'm Just Here for the Music" reached number 87 on the Billboard Hot 100, becoming Abdul's fifteenth song to appear on the chart.

In an interview with the Los Angeles Times in July 2009, Abdul's manager David Sonenberg told the newspaper that, "Very sadly, it does not appear that she's going to be back on Idol." This came about as a result of stalled negotiations between Abdul and the series. In August, after numerous contract negotiations, Abdul confirmed that she would not return to Idol for its ninth season. The Times cited reports Abdul had been earning as much as $5 million per season and that she was reportedly seeking as much as $20 million to return. Abdul was replaced by Ellen DeGeneres. Abdul claimed her departure from Idol was not about money, but that she had to stand on principle.

=== 2010–2015: Live to Dance, The X Factor and So You Think You Can Dance ===
In January 2010, Abdul presented a Lifetime Achievement Award to choreographer Julie McDonald at the 11th Anniversary show of The Carnival: Choreographer's Ball. In November, Abdul launched and co-founded AuditionBooth.com, a website that allows aspiring talents to connect with casting directors, producers, and managers.

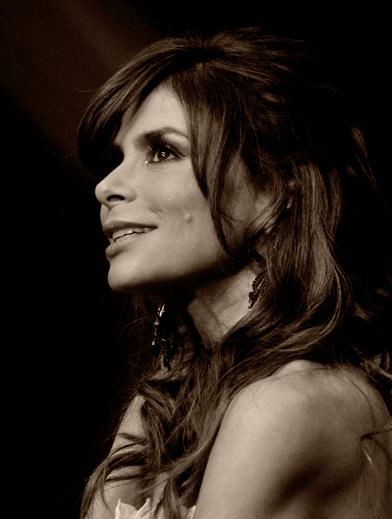
Abdul on the set of Live to Dance in 2011

In January 2011, Abdul began appearing on the short-lived CBS reality competition series Live to Dance, where she was also an executive producer. Abdul said that unlike American Idol, Live to Dance is less about "competition" and more about "celebration". After its first season of seven episodes, it was cancelled by CBS. In May 2011, it was announced that Abdul would rejoin Cowell on the first season of the American edition of The X Factor. In January 2012, Abdul announced that she would not return as a judge for the series' second season. Abdul was replaced by Demi Lovato. In October 2012, Abdul served as a guest judge during week four of the All-Stars version of Dancing with the Stars. In April 2013, Abdul appeared on the Top 5 results show of season 12 of American Idol to compliment contestant Candice Glover on her performance of "Straight Up".

On July 9, 2013, Abdul was a guest judge on So You Think You Can Dance (season ten). In October 2013, Abdul was named as a judge on the revamped So You Think You Can Dance Australia, which aired on Australia's Network Ten from February 9 through May 1, 2014. Abdul was present as a permanent member of the judge's panel for all episodes of this season. She later became a permanent judge of the American version starting with its twelfth season. In January 2017, Abdul announced that she would not be returning as a judge for its fourteenth season because of her tour schedule.

In April 2014, Abdul was a guest judge on RuPaul's Drag Race (episode "Queens of Talk"), which reunited her with previous Idol contestant Adore Delano. In June 2014, Abdul made a cameo appearance on the Australian soap opera Neighbours and shared scenes with established character Karl Kennedy (Alan Fletcher). In 2015, Abdul made a guest appearance on the comedy sitcom Real Husbands of Hollywood on its season 4 premiere. She was shown in a comedic scene with Arsenio Hall where she was trying to kick Hall out of her pool house. On November 16, 2015, Abdul along with Charles "Chucky" Klapow, Renee Richie, and Nakul Dev Mahajan won the World Choreography Award for Outstanding Choreography Digital Format for the video 'Check Yourself'. On November 22, 2015, Abdul and Donnie Wahlberg presented Favorite Female Artist – Pop/Rock at the 43rd American Music Awards; the award Abdul won at the 1990 AMAs, presented to her by Wahlberg.

=== 2016–present: Return to performing, Las Vegas residency ===
On August 6, 2016, Abdul performed a full headline set for the first time in 26 years at the Mixtape Festival in Hershey, Pennsylvania. In November 2016, New Kids on the Block announced that Abdul would be touring with them and Boyz II Men on their Total Package Tour in 2017; her first tour in 25 years. The tour began on May 12 in Columbus, Ohio, and concluded on July 16, 2017, in Hollywood, Florida, for a total of 47 shows. In an interview with Elle magazine, Abdul stated there were "many reasons" she decided to return to the stage after over two decades, saying: "I took a long break and had sustained some injuries in the past. Then I returned to television with American Idol and that took up a good decade of my life. Then I went out to do some more television, as well. I always wanted to get back on stage, because I missed it. I wanted to get back in close contact with the people who have supported me all throughout my career and be able to see them again. Plus, I was getting asked all the time if I would ever do it again! I finally said, You know what, I want to and I'm going to make it a priority. I'm really passionate about it and it's fun, and I want to connect with my fans around the country."

In July 2018, Abdul announced that she would embark on a solo headlining tour across North America that fall, entitled Straight Up Paula!, as part of the celebration of the 30th anniversary of her debut studio album Forever Your Girl. The tour began in Tulsa, Oklahoma, on October 18 and concluded in Los Angeles, California, on June 7, 2019, for a total of 25 shows.

Abdul performed a medley of her greatest hits at the 2019 Billboard Music Awards, closing out the show. On May 1, 2019, Abdul announced her first Las Vegas residency, Paula Abdul: Forever Your Girl. The residency's first leg began on August 13, the first of 20 dates, ending in January 2020. On June 7, 2019, Abdul opened LA Pride.

Abdul also performed at the fourteenth series finale of America's Got Talent with Light Balance Kids, Brian King Joseph, and Tyler Butler-Figueroa to surprise Cowell. In October 2020, it was announced that Abdul would serve as a panelist for Fox's reality competition, The Masked Dancer. In April 2021, ABC announced that Abdul would return to American Idol as a guest-judge while Luke Bryan was out sick after being diagnosed with COVID-19. She returned as a guest judge on Dancing with the Stars for Music Video Night in its 32nd season. In 2023, Abdul joined the producing team of the Broadway musical How to Dance in Ohio. She also appeared as a contestant on Celebrity Wheel of Fortune. In 2024, Abdul co-headlines The Magic Summer Tour. Her Straight Up! to Canada Tour that was scheduled to commence in September 2024 has since been cancelled.

On 2 March 2025, Abdul was a panel judge in the first round of the tenth series of Let's Dance, a Slovak adaptation of Strictly Come Dancing, presented by TV Markíza. The show was broadcast from Incheba in Bratislava, Slovakia.

== Personal life ==
=== Relationships ===
Abdul married actor Emilio Estevez in 1992, and filed for divorce in 1994. In 1995, Abdul stated that the reason for their divorce was that she wanted children and Estevez, who had two children from a previous relationship, did not. Abdul married clothing designer Brad Beckerman in 1996, at the New England Carousel Museum in Bristol, Connecticut. They filed for divorce in 1998, after 17 months of marriage, citing irreconcilable differences.

=== Beliefs ===
Abdul is observant in her Jewish faith, and is proud of her heritage. She once stated, "My father is a Syrian Jew whose family immigrated to Brazil. My mother is Canadian with Jewish roots. My dream is to go to Israel for a real holiday." In November 2006, when Israeli Tourism Minister Isaac Herzog invited her to Israel, Abdul responded with a hug, adding, "I will come; you have helped me make a dream come true." In 2013, at the age of 51, Abdul had her bat mitzvah in Safed, Israel, at the International Center for Tzfat Kabbalah, a museum and spiritual retreat for the study of Kabbalah – Jewish mysticism. In 2003, Abdul was reported as a practitioner of Transcendental Meditation.

Abdul is a dog lover who raised awareness about National Guide Dog Month in May 2009, and she teamed up with Dick Van Patten to help people with blindness to have more independence through the help of guide dogs. She does not wear real fur.

=== Health ===
Abdul has claimed that she was seriously injured in a plane crash in Iowa in 1992 during her Under My Spell Tour, necessitating fifteen cervical spinal surgeries. The accuracy of her claim has been questioned by some publications, such as Jezebel, in part because the National Transportation Safety Board, which is tasked with investigating all aviation accidents in the United States, has no record of an accident matching Abdul's description. In response to skepticism, she said in 2020, "There are seven other people that were on the plane, who were in that plane accident with me. So, I really don't care what people have to say. I don't." No one else who may have been aboard the flight has publicly corroborated Abdul's account, though she claims she had them sign non-disclosure agreements.

In 1994, Abdul sought treatment for bulimia nervosa, which she revealed years later had first developed during her teens and only intensified after she became a pop star. She said: "I learned at a very early age I didn't fit in physically. I learned through years of rejections from auditions. I would ask myself, 'Why can't I be tall and skinny like the other dancers?' I felt nervous and out of control, and all I could think about was food. Food numbed the fear and anxiety. I'd eat and then run to the bathroom."

In 2005, Abdul said she had been diagnosed in November 2004 with a neurological disorder causing chronic pain, reflex sympathetic dystrophy (RSD), following a "cheerleading accident" at age 17. She discussed the diagnosis in response to allegations of drug use.

In April 2006, Abdul filed a report at a Hollywood police station stating she had been a victim of battery at a private party at about 1 am on April 2, according to LAPD spokesman Lt. Paul Vernon. "According to Abdul, the man at the party argued with her, grabbed her by the arm and threw her against a wall," Vernon said. "She said she had sustained a concussion and spinal injuries."

==== Allegations of drug use ====
Substance abuse allegations arose as the result of what some described as "erratic behavior" by Abdul during episodes of American Idol. After reading these allegations on message boards, Abdul told People in April 2005 about her RSD diagnosis; she added that she was pain-free following treatment with anti-inflammatory medication. Allegations arose again in January 2007 when videos circulated on the Internet of Abdul appearing to sway in her chair and slur her speech during a set of interviews. Abdul's publicist attributed this to fatigue and technical difficulties during the recording of the interviews. It was revealed on the Bravo show Hey Paula, which had followed Abdul with a video camera prior to the interviews, that Abdul had not been sleeping, perhaps suffering from some mild form of insomnia. In February 2007, Abdul told Us Weekly that she had never been drunk or used illegal drugs, and called the allegations "lies".

In May 2009, Ladies' Home Journal posted an article on its website that said that Abdul told them she stayed at the La Costa Resort and Spa in Carlsbad, California, for three days the previous year to recover from physical dependence on prescription pain medications. The medications, prescribed due to injuries and her RSD diagnosis, included a pain patch, nerve medication, and a muscle relaxant. According to the article, Abdul said the medications made her "get weird" at times and that she suffered from physical withdrawal symptoms during her recovery. Later that same week, in an interview with Detroit radio station WKQI, Abdul rejected the article's accuracy. She told the radio station she never checked into a rehab clinic and never had a drug abuse problem.

=== 2004 car crash ===
In December 2004, Abdul was driving her Mercedes-Benz on a Los Angeles-area freeway when she changed lanes and hit another vehicle, but did not stop or render assistance. The driver and passenger took a photograph with a cell phone camera and wrote down the license plate number of the car, which was traced to Abdul. In March 2005, Abdul was fined US$900 and given 24 months of informal probation after pleading nolo contendere (no contest) to misdemeanor hit-and-run driving. She was ordered to pay US$775 for damage to the other car.

=== 2005 accusations by Corey Clark ===
In May 2005, ABC's Primetime Live reported claims by season 2 American Idol contestant Corey Clark that he and Abdul had had an affair during that season, and that she had coached him on how to succeed in the competition. Some considered Clark's timing suspicious as he was marketing a CD and trying to get a book deal, but Clark said that his career was being prejudiced because of his relationship with Abdul, and that is why he came forward with the information to clear his name.

For the most part, Abdul refused to comment on Clark's allegations. Simon Cowell came to Abdul's defense, stating, "It was just somebody using her to get a lot of publicity for an appalling record, full stop." Abdul appeared in a Saturday Night Live skit, making light of the situation. In August 2005, the Fox network confirmed that Abdul would be returning to the show, as the investigation had found "insufficient evidence that the communications between Mr. Clark and Ms. Abdul in any way aided his performance".

=== 2008 stalking incident ===
On November 11, 2008, a 30-year-old woman named Paula Goodspeed was found dead in her car outside of Abdul's Los Angeles-area home. The death was ruled a suicide by drug overdose, and she was found surrounded by prescription pills, along with photos and CDs of Abdul. Goodspeed was an obsessive fan of Abdul, having legally changed her name to Paula, drawn many pictures of her, sent her flowers and auditioned for Abdul on season 5 of American Idol in 2005 at a stop in Austin, Texas, before being dismissed from the show. Goodspeed had been accused in the press of being a celebrity stalker but her relatives disputed the claim.

=== 2023 sexual assault lawsuit against Nigel Lythgoe ===
On December 29, 2023, Abdul filed a lawsuit accusing producer Nigel Lythgoe of sexual assault when they worked together on American Idol in the 2000s. Lythgoe denied the allegations. It was reported in December 2024 that the case had been settled. Abdul commented on the settlement, "I am grateful that this chapter has successfully come to a close and is now something I can now put behind me," while expressing optimism that her experience could inspire women facing similar obstacles.

== Discography ==
Studio albums

- Forever Your Girl (1988)
- Spellbound (1991)
- Head over Heels (1995)

== Tours and residencies ==
Headlining

- Under My Spell Tour (1991–92)
- Straight Up Paula! (2018–19)

Co-headlining

- Club MTV Live (1989)
- Total Package Tour (2017) (with New Kids on the Block and Boyz II Men)
- The Magic Summer Tour (2024) (with New Kids on the Block and DJ Jazzy Jeff)

Residency

- Paula Abdul: Forever Your Girl (2019–20)

== Filmography ==
=== Film ===
Year	Title	Role	Notes
1978	Junior High School	Sherry	
1983	Private School	Cheerleader	
1986	A Smoky Mountain Christmas	Choreographer	TV movie
1987	Can't Buy Me Love	Dancer	
1991	L.A. Story	Roller Skater	
1997	Touched By Evil	Ellen Collier	TV movie
1998	The Waiting Game	Amy Fuentes	TV movie
1999	Mr. Rock 'n' Roll: The Alan Freed Story	Denise Walton	TV movie
2002	The Master of Disguise	Choreographer	
2005	Robots	Watch (voice)	
2005	Romy and Michele: In the Beginning	Herself	TV movie
2009	Brüno	Herself	
2018	A Sister's Secret	Detective Tupper	TV movie
2020	Impractical Jokers: The Movie	Herself	
2022	Chip 'n Dale: Rescue Rangers	Herself	
2026	Raging Midlife	Mary Todd	

=== Television ===
Year	Title	Role	Notes
1988	Soul Train	Herself	Episode: "New Edition/Paula Abdul"
1988	Showtime at the Apollo	Herself	Episode: "Episode 2.5" & "2.12"
1989	The Tracey Ullman Show	Herself	Episode: "Episode 3.18"
1990	Going Live!	Herself	Episode: "Episode 3.30"
1995	Fully Booked	Herself	Episode: "Episode 1.8"
1996	Muppets Tonight	Herself	Episode: "Paula Abdul"
1996	Cybill	Herself	Episode: "Lowenstein's Lament"
1996	The Single Guy	Herself	Episode: "Affair"
1998	Saturday Night Live	Herself	Episode: "David Duchovny/Puff Daddy/Jimmy Page"
1998	Spin City	Herself	Episode: "It Happened One Night"
1999	The Wayans Bros.	Sasha	Episode: "Dream Girl"
1999	All That	Herself	Episode: "All That Live! (100th Episode)"
1999	Chicken Soup for the Soul	Herself	Episode: "The Window/Cookie Thief/Appointment/All Good Things"
1999	Sabrina, the Teenage Witch	Herself	Episode: "Aging, Not So Gracefully"
2002	Mad TV	Herself	Episode: "Episode 8.1"
2002	Hollywood Squares	Herself/Panelist	Recurring Guest
2002–2009	American Idol	Herself/Judge	Main Judge: Seasons 1–8
2003	Ant & Dec's Saturday Night Takeaway	Herself	Episode: "Episode 2.3"
2003–06	E! True Hollywood Story	Herself	Recurring Guest
2004	Driven	Herself	Episode: "Paula Abdul"
2004	The Bernie Mac Show	Herself	Episode: "That Old Mac Magic"
2004	That's So Raven	The Host	Episode: "The Road to Audition"
2005	Your Total Health	Herself	Episode: "Episode 2.2"
2005	Fashion in Focus	Herself	Episode: "Big Money Under the Tents"
2005	Biography	Herself	Episode: "Paula Abdul"
2005	Dateline NBC	Herself	Episode: "Episode 13.36"
2005	All of Us	Herself	Episode: "Hollywood Swinging"
2005	Saturday Night Live	Herself	Episode: "Johnny Knoxville/System of a Down"
2005	The Contender	Herself	Episode: "Series Finale"
2005	I Love the '80s 3-D	Herself	10 episodes
2005	Less Than Perfect	Kathleen	Episode: "Distractions"
2005–07	Family Guy	Herself (voice)	Guest: Season 4, Recurring Cast: Season 6
2006	The X Factor	Herself	Recurring Guest: Season 3
2007	Hey Paula	Herself	Main Cast
2007	The Friday Night Project	Herself/Guest Host	Episode: "Episode 5.6"
2008	RAH! Paula Abdul's Cheerleading Bowl	Herself/Host	Main Host
2008	Hollywood Residential	Herself	Episode: "The Hotness"
2008	Hotel Babylon	Herself	Episode: "Episode 3.1"
2009	InFANity	Herself	Episode: "American Idol"
2009	Howie Do It	Herself	Episode: "Episode 1.5"
2009	E! Investigates	Herself	Episode: "Stalkers"
2009	VH1 Divas	Herself/Host	Main Host
2009–2011	Drop Dead Diva	Herself	Recurring Cast: Seasons 1–3
2010	American Idol	Herself	Guest: Season 9 Finale
2011	Live to Dance	Herself/Judge	Main Judge
2011	The X Factor	Herself/Judge	Main Judge: Season 1
2012	I Will Survive	Herself	Episode: "Episode 1.14"
2012	Dancing with the Stars	Herself/Guest Judge	Season 15 Episode: "Opponents' Choice Week"
2013	American Idol	Herself	Guest: Season 12
2013–2014	RuPaul's Drag Race	Herself/Guest Judge	Season 5 Episode 14: "Reunited"; Season 6 Episode 9: "Queens of Talk"
2013–2016	So You Think You Can Dance	Herself/Judge	Guest Judge: Season 10, Main Judge: Seasons 12–13
2014	So You Think You Can Dance Australia	Herself/Judge	Main Judge: Season 4
2014	Neighbours	Herself	Episode: "Episode 1.6910"
2015	Real Husbands of Hollywood	Herself	Episode: "Suck My Trick"
2015	Strictly Come Dancing	Herself	Episode: "Week Four"
2016	American Idol	Herself	Guest: Season 15 Finale
2016	Cooper Barrett's Guide to Surviving Life	Herself	Episode: "How to Survive Insufficient Funds"
2016	Lip Sync Battle	Herself	Episode: "Channing Tatum vs. Jenna Dewan-Tatum"
2016	Bookaboo	Herself	Episode: "Bookaboo's Barkin' New Year's Eve"
2017	Fresh Off the Boat	Holly	Episode: "Do You Hear What I Hear?"
2018	Impractical Jokers: After Party	Herself	Episode: "Bull Shiatsu"
2018	The X Factor	Herself/Adviser	Episode: "Judges' Houses 1"
2019	America's Got Talent	Herself	Episode: "Live Results Finale"
2020	Celebrity Ghost Stories	Herself	Episode: "Paula Abdul"
2020	Impractical Jokers: Dinner Party	Herself	Episode: "The Backyard Cookout Episode"
2020–21	The Masked Dancer	Herself/Panelist	Main Panelist
2021	American Idol	Herself/Judge	Guest Judge: Season 19
2021	For Real: The Story of Reality TV	Herself	Episode: "Make It Work"
2021	Secret Celebrity Renovation	Herself	Episode: "Paula Abdul"
2021	The Movies That Made Us	Herself	Episode: "Coming to America"
2021	Superstar	Herself	Episode: "George Michael"
2021	I Can See Your Voice	Herself/Panelist	Episode: "Holiday Spectacular: Debbie Gibson, Nicole Byer, Paula Abdul, Cheryl Hines, Adrienne Houghton"
2021	The Greatest AtHome Videos	Herself	Episode: "Let Paula Be the Judge"
2022	American Idol	Herself	Guest: Season 20
2022	Janet Jackson	Herself	Episode: "Part 2 & 4"
2022	Bling Empire	Herself	Episode: "Adieu ma Chérie"
2022	American Rescue Dog Show	Herself/Judge	Main Judge
2022	Made for Love	Anydoors	Recurring Cast: Season 2
2023	The Muppets Mayhem	Herself	Episode: "Track 7: Eight Days a Week"
2023	Luann & Sonja: Welcome to Crappie Lake	Herself	Episode: 2 episodes
2023	Hell's Kitchen	Herself	Chef's table guest diner for the red team; Episode: "Just Bring the DARN Fish!"
2023	Dancing with the Stars	Herself/Guest Judge	Episode: "Music Video Night"
2023	Celebrity Wheel of Fortune	Herself	Contestant
2024	The Real Housewives of Beverly Hills	Herself	Episode: "Bitter Pill to Swallow"
2024	Impractical Jokers	Herself	Episode: "Paula Abdul"
2025	Canada's Drag Race	Herself/Guest Judge	Season 6 Episode 1: "Not Sorry Aboot It"
2026	Impractical Jokers	Herself	Episode: "Celebrity Crushed"

== Choreography ==
Music Videos
Year	Artist	Music Video
1984	The Jacksons	"Torture"
1986	Janet Jackson	"What Have You Done for Me Lately"
1986	Janet Jackson	"Nasty"
1986	Janet Jackson	"When I Think of You"
1986	Janet Jackson	"Control"
1986	ZZ Top	"Velcro Fly"
1986	Toto	"Till The End"
1986	Duran Duran	"Notorious"
1986	The Pointer Sisters	"Goldmine"
1987	Angela Winbush	"Run to Me"
1987	Debbie Gibson	"Shake Your Love"
1988	Steve Winwood	"Roll with It"
1988	INXS	"Devil Inside"
1988	Taylor Dayne	"Prove Your Love"
1988	George Michael	"Monkey"
2014	Avon	"Check Yourself"

Tours
Year	Artist	Tour
1984	The Jacksons	"Victory Tour"
1987	Kool & the Gang	
1988	George Michael	"The Faith Tour"

Movies
Year	Title	Notes
1983	Private School	
1986	A Smoky Mountain Christmas	
1987	The Tracey Ullman Show	Won an Emmy Award
1987	Dragnet	
1987	Can't Buy Me Love	
1987	The Running Man	
1988	Action Jackson	
1988	Coming To America	
1988	Big	
1988	Bull Durham	
1989	She's Out of Control	
1989	Dance to Win	
1989	The Karate Kid Part III	
1990	17th American Music Awards	Won an Emmy for her own performance, "(It's Just) The Way That You Love Me"
1990	62nd Academy Awards	"Under the Sea" from 'The Little Mermaid' and "Best Costume Design" category
1991	The Doors	Val Kilmer's choreographer
1996	Jerry Maguire	
1999	American Beauty	
2001	Black Knight	
2001	Reefer Madness	Off-Broadway
2003	Zoe's Dance Moves	
2009	American Idol	Season 8-Disco Week (Results Show)
2022	1660 Vine	

== See also ==
- List of awards and nominations received by Paula Abdul
- List of artists who reached number one in the United States
- List of artists who reached number one on the U.S. Adult Contemporary chart
- List of artists who reached number one on the U.S. Dance Club Songs chart
- List of artists who reached number one on the Australian singles chart
