= International Center for Tzfat Kabbalah =

International Center for Tzfat Kabbalah was founded in the Old City of Safed, or Tzfat as it is known in Hebrew, in 2007 by the Jewish Federation of Palm Beach, Florida, in cooperation with the Israeli Ministry of Tourism and the Jewish Agency for Israel to promote Safed as a Kabbalah center.

The center has a "Visitors' center on the history of Kabbalah in Safed", a lecture and study room, and a library. The center holds seminars and workshops in receipt of Safed rabbis.
