= Charles Pember Squires =

Las Vegas Businessman

Charles Pember Squires (1865–1958), also known as C.P. "Pop" Squires, is often referred to as the "Father of Las Vegas". He was instrumental in the city's early growth. Squires bought the Las Vegas Age newspaper in 1908, and with this platform became the community's chief advocate for creation of Clark County, city incorporation, women's suffrage, and development of the Colorado River for power and water, helping launch the campaign that led to the construction of Hoover Dam. He was instrumental in pushing the plan to build Hoover Dam through many stages of bureaucracy until the U.S. Government took it over and initiated the massive project.

In 1944 Charles P. Squires sold the land parcel that would ultimately become the Flamingo Las Vegas built by Billy Wilkerson and Bugsy Siegel.
