= George Jessel =

George Jessel may refer to:

- George Jessel (actor) (1898–1981), American actor
- George Jessel (jurist) (1824–1883), English jurist
- George Jessel of the Jessel baronets
