= Hey Paula (TV series) =

- Genre: Reality
- Directed by: Jason Sands
- Starring: Paula Abdul
- Country of origin: United States
- Original language: English
- No. of seasons: 1
- No. of episodes: 7

Production
- Executive producers: Scott Sternberg; David Russo; Paula Abdul
- Producer: Scott Sternberg
- Running time: 24 minutes
- Production company: Scott Sternberg Productions

Original release
- Network: Bravo
- Release: June 28 – July 27, 2007

Hey Paula is an American reality television series starring American singer and television personality Paula Abdul that aired from June 28 to July 27, 2007, on Bravo.

The series averaged 520,000 total viewers. During the filming of the series, Abdul was fired from the Bratz movie. Though her reaction to this was captured on camera, a rep for Abdul subsequently denied the veracity of the segment, attributing Abdul's emotional break-down to "very creative editing". Bravo reps said "The email Paula received and her reaction was a very real and emotional moment that was shown as it happenned".

== Episodes ==
No.	Title	Original release date	Viewers (millions)
1	"This Is My Life"	June 28, 2007	0.619
Paula gets all glamorous to attend the Grammy Awards but her pooch, Chomps, chews on her loaned million dollar ring. Later, Paula goes to a home shopping network to promote her new jewelry line.
2	"Sleepless In New York"	June 28, 2007	0.596
Paula attends a fashion gala and is awarded a Fashion Icon Award. Later, a tired Paula talks with her perfume manufacturers and does various American Idol interviews.
3	"Woman of the Year"	July 5, 2007	0.422
Paula holds a staff meeting to discuss her recent bad publicity and then she goes shopping. Las Vegas beckons, meaning she'll have to face the press head-on.
4	"All that Glitters"	July 12, 2007	N/A
Paula hosts a charity event to help animal victims of Hurricane Katrina. Later, she appears on the home shopping network once again and prepares for an appearance on "The Late Show with David Letterman".
5	"Snowed In"	July 19, 2007	N/A
As Paula prepares to head to New York for the day to rest and then give an interview on "The Late Show with David Letterman", things totally go haywire as a snowstorm mixes up Paula's plans. Paula is stuck in Philadelphia after doing a segment on QVC until the snow storm dies down. Will Paula ever make it to David Letterman?
6	"Summer Rental"	July 26, 2007	N/A
Paula plans to rent a house while her home is being remodeled and asks her best friend/hairstylist Daniel to help her decorate. Daniel tours the rental house with Deb the interior designer to determine décor. Daniel and Deb make decorative executive decisions, and move in new furniture the very next week. But when Paula arrives to look at the house, she hates it and calls Deb to complain. After reconsidering, Paula decides to hold off on remodeling her house, and lets go of the newly decorated rental house.
7	"Shut Up and Dance"	August 2, 2007	0.272
In the season/series finale, Paula auditions dancers for a new project. Then we see how she deals with her chronic pain problems in her daily life -- a problem that gets worse after she trips over one of her beloved dogs and damages the cartilage in her nose. We meet her acupuncturist while she does an interview with Billy Bush of Access Hollywood. Later, Paula meets with producer Peter Lord, whom she hasn't worked with for over ten years, to discuss her getting back in the music game. Paula's boyfriend throws her a birthday party and surprises her with her dad and other family members.
