= Paula Abdul discography =

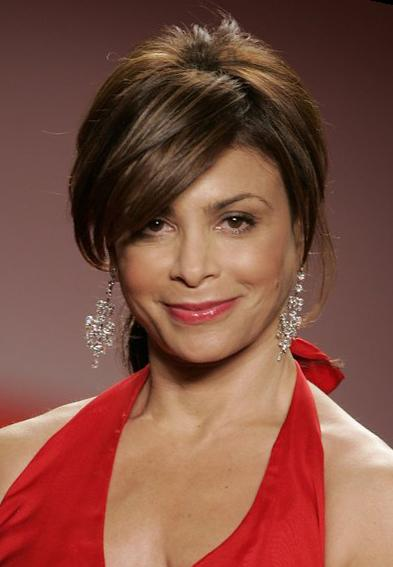
- Studio albums: 3
- Extended plays: 1
- Compilation albums: 6
- Singles: 16
- Video albums: 4
- Music videos: 20
- Remix albums: 1
- Other appearances: 3

The discography of American singer and dancer Paula Abdul consists of three studio albums, one remix album, six compilation albums, four video albums, sixteen singles, and three other appearances. Having found success as a choreographer for artists such as Janet Jackson, Abdul launched her own music career with the release of her debut studio album Forever Your Girl (1988). The album topped the Billboard 200 chart, and to date holds the record for the longest climb to number one for an album. The project spawned a number of successful singles, and is one of only nine albums to have four singles top the Billboard Hot 100 chart. It went on to earn a seven-times platinum certification from the Recording Industry Association of America (RIAA).

Abdul released the Shut Up and Dance: Mixes (1990) remix album to a positive commercial reaction, earning a platinum certification from the RIAA. She continued to find success with the release of Spellbound (1991), her second studio album. It debuted at number five on the Billboard 200, climbing to the top soon after it was released. The album's first two singles both topped the Hot 100 chart with the first, "Rush Rush" becoming first number-one single in six years to spend more than four weeks on top. Third single "Blowing Kisses in the Wind" reached the top ten. Despite the album's achievements, it failed to match the success of its predecessor. Following a musical hiatus while dealing with personal issues, Abdul returned with the release of Head over Heels (1995), her third studio album. The album was met with a mixed reaction from critics. Following the release of the album, Abdul entered a second musical hiatus.

Abdul released the single "Dance Like There's No Tomorrow" (2008) with Randy Jackson, her first single in twelve years. She later released "I'm Just Here for the Music" (2009) the following year. Throughout her career, she has sold over 50 million records worldwide. Billboard listed her as the 92nd Greatest Artist of all Time. She is recognized as the reigning "Dance-pop Princess" by the media while others says she is the original "Pop Princess" of her generation. According to RIAA, She has sold 11.5 million certified albums in the United States.

== Albums ==
=== Studio albums ===
List of studio albums, with selected details, chart positions, sales, and certifications
Title	Album details	Peak chart positions										Certifications
Title	Album details	US	AUS	CAN	FRA	GER	JPN	NLD	NZ	SWE	UK	Certifications
Forever Your Girl	Released: June 13, 1988; Label: Virgin (#90943); Formats: LP, CD, cassette	1	1	1	12	24	95	19	19	6	3	RIAA: 7× Platinum; ARIA: Platinum; BPI: Platinum; MC: 7× Platinum; RMNZ: Platinum
Spellbound	Released: May 14, 1991; Label: Virgin (#91611); Formats: LP, CD, cassette	1	3	6	36	17	12	45	14	6	4	RIAA: 3× Platinum; ARIA: Gold; BPI: Gold; MC: 2× Platinum
Head over Heels	Released: June 13, 1995; Label: Virgin (#40525); Formats: LP, CD, cassette	18	27	21	—	—	32	74	—	—	61	RIAA: Gold
"—" denotes a recording that did not chart or was not released in that territory.

=== Compilation albums ===
List of compilation albums, with selected details and chart positions
Title	Album details	Peak chart positions
Title	Album details	US R&B
The Greatest	Released: 1998; Label: Virgin (#VJCP 51044); Formats: CD	—
Greatest Hits	Released: September 26, 2000; Label: Virgin (#48980); Formats: CD	—
Greatest Hits: Straight Up!	Released: May 8, 2007; Label: Virgin (#90527); Formats: CD, digital download	86
10 Great Songs	Released: June 14, 2011; Label: Virgin (#83249); Formats: CD, digital download	46
Straight Up! The Very Best of Paula Abdul	Released: June 18, 2012; Label: Music Club Deluxe (#B006ZGDD5C); Formats: CD	—
Icon	Released: October 8, 2013; Label: Virgin (#B0018870-02); Formats: CD	—
"—" denotes a recording that did not chart or was not released in that territory.

=== Remix albums ===
List of remix albums, with selected details, chart positions, and certifications
Title	Album details	Peak chart positions									Certifications
Title	Album details	US	AUS	CAN	FRA	GER	NLD	NZ	SWE	UK	Certifications
Shut Up and Dance: Mixes	Released: May 8, 1990; Label: Virgin (#91362); Formats: LP, CD, cassette	7	16	14	44	37	29	4	24	40	RIAA: Platinum; MC: Platinum; RMNZ: Gold

=== Video albums ===
List of video albums, with selected details and certifications
Title	Album details	Certifications
Straight Up (Note: Not to be confused with a VHS promotional release of the same title, featuring only "Straight Up" music video issued by Siren.)	Released: 1989; Label: Virgin (#VVD 639); Formats: VHS	RIAA: 2× Platinum; CRIA: Gold
Captivated: The Video Collection '92	Released: June 29, 1992; Label: Virgin (#VIR 769); Formats: VHS, LD	RIAA: Gold
Under My Spell: Live	Released: February 27, 1996; Label: Virgin (#6523); Formats: VHS	
Video Hits	Released: January 11, 2005; Label: Virgin (#9771); Formats: DVD	

== Extended plays ==
List of extended plays with selected details
Title	EP details
The Singles	Released: January 1992; Label: Virgin (#VJCP 14038); Formats: CD (Japan exclusive)

== Singles ==
List of singles as lead artist, with selected chart positions and certifications, showing year released and album name
Title	Year	Peak chart positions										Certifications	Album
Title	Year	US	AUS	CAN	FRA	GER	IRL	NLD	NZ	SWE	UK	Certifications	Album
"Knocked Out"	1988	41	—	27	45	—	17	—	—	—	21		Forever Your Girl
"(It's Just) The Way That You Love Me"	1988	3	76	5	—	—	—	—	12	—	74		Forever Your Girl
"Straight Up"	1988	1	27	2	12	3	6	2	6	2	3	RIAA: 2× Platinum; BPI: Silver; GLF: Gold; MC: platinum	Forever Your Girl
"Forever Your Girl"	1989	1	51	1	—	17	21	13	11	—	24	RIAA: Gold	Forever Your Girl
"Cold Hearted"	1989	1	68	2	33	38	—	63	25	—	46	RIAA: Platinum; MC: Gold	Forever Your Girl
"Opposites Attract" (with the Wild Pair)	1989	1	1	1	23	14	8	4	6	11	2	RIAA: Gold; ARIA: 2× Platinum; BPI: Silver; MC: Gold	Forever Your Girl
"Rush Rush"	1991	1	2	1	24	12	11	6	7	7	6	RIAA: Platinum; ARIA: Gold; GLF: Gold	Spellbound
"The Promise of a New Day"	1991	1	31	2	—	86	—	39	26	37	52		Spellbound
"Blowing Kisses in the Wind"	1991	6	—	7	—	—	—	—	—	—	—		Spellbound
"Vibeology"	1991	16	63	19	—	—	29	20	50	—	19		Spellbound
"Will You Marry Me?"	1992	19	54	6	—	74	—	—	—	—	73		Spellbound
"My Love Is for Real"	1995	28	7	20	—	87	—	—	20	—	28		Head over Heels
"Crazy Cool"	1995	58	76	49	—	89	—	—	—	—	—		Head over Heels
"Ain't Never Gonna Give You Up"	1995	— (Note: "Ain't Never Gonna Give You Up" did not chart on the Billboard Hot 100, though did peak at number twelve on the Bubbling Under Hot 100 chart.)	—	—	—	—	—	—	—	—	—		Head over Heels
"Dance Like There's No Tomorrow" (with Randy Jackson)	2008	62	—	68	—	—	—	—	—	—	—		Randy Jackson's Music Club, Vol. 1
"I'm Just Here for the Music"	2009	87	—	—	—	—	—	—	—	—	—		Non-album single

=== Promotional singles ===
Title	Year	Album
"Dream Medley"	2012	Non-album single

=== Charity singles ===
Title	Year	Album
"Check Yourself"	2014	Non-album single

== Other appearances ==
List of songs, showing year released and album name
Title	Year	Album
"Bend Time Back Around"	1992	Beverly Hills, 90210: The Soundtrack.
"Zip-a-Dee-Doo-Dah"	1993	For Our Children: The Concert
"So Free"	2012	Realism

== Music videos ==
List of music videos, showing year released and directors
Title	Year	Director(s)
"Knocked Out" (2 versions)	1988	Daniel Kleinman (original version)
"Knocked Out" (2 versions)	1988	Candace Reckinger and Michael Patterson (remix)
"(It's Just) The Way That You Love Me" (2 versions)	1988	David Fincher
"Straight Up"	1989	David Fincher
"Forever Your Girl"	1989	David Fincher
"Cold Hearted"	1989	David Fincher
"Opposites Attract"	1989	Candace Reckinger and Michael Patterson
"1990 Medley Mix"	1990	—N/a
"Skat Strut" (by MC Skat Kat)	1991	—N/a
"Rush Rush"	1991	Stefan Würnitzer
"The Promise of a New Day"	1991	Big TV!
"Blowing Kisses in the Wind"	1991	Big TV!
"Vibeology" (2 versions)	1992	Stephen Wurnitzer
"Will You Marry Me?"	1992	Big TV!
"My Love Is for Real"	1995	Michael Haussman
"Crazy Cool"	1995	Matthew Rolston
"Ain't Never Gonna Give You Up"	1996	Matthew Rolston
"Dance Like There's No Tomorrow"	2008	Paula Abdul

== See also ==
- List of best-selling remix albums
- Lists of Billboard number-one singles (United States)
- List of Billboard number-one dance club songs
- List of number-one adult contemporary hits (United States)
- Billboard Year-End number one singles
- List of number-one singles in Canada
- List of UK top-ten singles in 1991
- List of Australian chart achievements and milestones
