= Greatest Hits: Straight Up! =

Greatest hits album by Paula Abdul
- Released: May 8, 2007
- Recorded: 1987–1995
- Length: 71:22
- Label: Virgin

Paula Abdul chronology
Greatest Hits (2000)	Greatest Hits: Straight Up! (2007)

Professional ratings
Review scores
Source	Rating
AllMusic	4/5 stars
PopMatters	5/10
Slant	3/5 stars

Greatest Hits: Straight Up! is the third greatest hits album by American singer Paula Abdul. It was released on May 8, 2007 by Virgin Records.

The album contains all of Abdul's singles from her three studio albums, including the singles "Will You Marry Me?" and "Ain't Never Gonna Give You Up" which were left off Greatest Hits (2000).

Greatest Hits: Straight Up! did not chart on the US Billboard 200 but reached number 86 on the Top R&B/Hip Hop Albums chart and number 78 in Mexico.

== Track listing ==
No.	Title	Writer(s)	Producer(s)	Length
1.	"Forever Your Girl" (from Forever Your Girl, 1988)	Oliver Leiber	Leiber	4:13
2.	"Straight Up" (from Forever Your Girl)	Elliot Wolff	Wolff	3:52
3.	"Cold Hearted" (from Forever Your Girl)	Wolff	Wolff	3:37
4.	"(It's Just) The Way That You Love Me" (from Forever Your Girl)	Leiber	Leiber	4:01
5.	"Knocked Out" (from Forever Your Girl)	Kenneth Edmonds; Antonio Reid; Daryl Simmons	L.A. and Babyface	3:32
6.	"One or the Other" (from Forever Your Girl)	Paula Abdul; Curtis Williams; Duncan Pain	Williams	4:10
7.	"Opposites Attract" (with The Wild Pair) (from Forever Your Girl)	Leiber	Leiber	3:50
8.	"Rush Rush" (from Spellbound, 1991)	Peter Lord	Lord; V. Jeffrey Smith	4:21
9.	"The Promise of a New Day" (from Spellbound)	Abdul; Lord; Sandra St. Victor; Smith	Lord; Smith	4:16
10.	"Blowing Kisses in the Wind" (from Spellbound)	Lord	Lord; Smith	4:18
11.	"Vibeology" (from Spellbound)	Lord; Victor; Smith	Lord; Smith	3:20
12.	"Bend Time Back 'Round" (from Beverly Hills 90210: The Soundtrack, 1992)	Wolff	Wolff	3:57
13.	"Will You Marry Me" (from Spellbound)	Abdul; Lord; Victor; Smith	Lord; Smith	4:24
14.	"My Love Is for Real" (from Head over Heels, 1995)	Abdul; Rhett Lawrence	Lawrence	4:03
15.	"Crazy Cool" (from Head over Heels)	Lord; Victor; Smith	Lord; Smith	4:02
16.	"If I Were Your Girl" (from Head over Heels)	Crystal Bernard; Lawrence	Lawrence	3:55
17.	"Ain't Never Gonna Give You Up" (from Head over Heels)	Byran Abrams; Mark Calderon; Howie Tee; Kevin Thornton; Sam Watters; Wolff	Wolff	3:53
18.	"It's All About Feeling Good" (from Head over Heels)	Abdul; Howard Hersh; Iky Levy; Robb Boldt	Hersh; Levy; Boldt	3:46

== Charts ==
Chart (2007)	Peak position
Mexican Albums (AMPROFON)	78
US Top R&B/Hip-Hop Albums (Billboard)	86
