= Greatest Hits (Paula Abdul album) =

Greatest hits album by Paula Abdul
- Released: September 26, 2000
- Recorded: 1988–1995
- Label: Virgin

Paula Abdul chronology
| Head over Heels (1995) | Greatest Hits (2000) | Greatest Hits: Straight Up! (2007) |

Greatest Hits is a greatest hits album by American singer Paula Abdul, released on September 26, 2000 by Virgin Records. It is her first greatest hits album to be released worldwide, and second greatest hits album overall, following the Japanese exclusive The Greatest (1998).

== Background ==
The album contains all of Abdul's singles from her three studio albums with the exception of "Will You Marry Me?" and "Ain't Never Gonna Give You Up". It also includes "Crazy Love" which was previously only available on the Japanese version of Head over Heels, "Bend Time Back 'Round" from the Beverly Hills, 90210 soundtrack, and the previously unreleased "Megamix Medley". By January 2006, the album had sold 138,000 copies in the United States.

Professional ratings
Review scores
| Source | Rating |
|---|---|
| Allmusic | 4/5 stars |
| The Encyclopedia of Popular Music | 4/5 stars |
| The Rolling Stone Album Guide | 3/5 stars |

== Track listing ==
| No. | Title | Writer(s) | Producer(s) | Length |
|---|---|---|---|---|
| 1. | "Straight Up" (from Forever Your Girl, 1988) | Elliot Wolff | Wolff | 3:52 |
| 2. | "Cold Hearted" (from Forever Your Girl) | Wolff | Wolff | 3:37 |
| 3. | "Forever Your Girl" (from Forever Your Girl) | Oliver Leiber | Leiber | 4:13 |
| 4. | "The Way That You Love Me" (from Forever Your Girl) | Leiber | Leiber | 4:01 |
| 5. | "Knocked Out" (from Forever Your Girl) | Kenneth Edmonds; Antonio Reid; Daryl Simmons | L.A. and Babyface | 3:32 |
| 6. | "Opposites Attract" (with The Wild Pair) (from Forever Your Girl) | Leiber | Leiber | 3:50 |
| 7. | "Bend Time Back 'Round" (from Beverly Hills 90210: The Soundtrack, 1992) | Wolff | Wolff | 3:57 |
| 8. | "Rush Rush" (from Spellbound, 1991) | Peter Lord | Lord; V. Jeffrey Smith | 4:21 |
| 9. | "The Promise of a New Day" (from Spellbound) | Paula Abdul; Lord; Sandra St. Victor; Smith | Lord; Smith | 4:16 |
| 10. | "Blowing Kisses in the Wind" (from Spellbound) | Lord | Lord; Smith | 4:18 |
| 11. | "Vibeology" (from Spellbound) | Lord; Victor; Smith | Lord; Smith | 3:20 |
| 12. | "My Love Is for Real" (R&B Remix featuring Ofra Haza) (from Head over Heels, 1995) | Abdul; Rhett Lawrence | Lawrence | 4:03 |
| 13. | "Crazy Cool" (from Head over Heels) | Lord; Victor; Smith | Lord; Smith | 4:02 |
| 14. | "If I Were Your Girl" (from Head over Heels) | Crystal Bernard; Lawrence | Lawrence | 3:55 |
| 15. | "Megamix Medley" | | Sergio Silva | 9:24 |
| 16. | "Crazy Love" (from Head over Heels) (Japanese edition) | Leiber | Leiber | 4:30 |
