= Under My Spell Tour =

1991–92 concert tour by Paula Abdul

Under My Spell World Tour
- Tour by Paula Abdul
- Promotional poster for the tour.
- Associated album: Spellbound
- Start date: October 26, 1991
- End date: August 7, 1992
- Legs: 4
- No. of shows: 76 in North America; 6 in Australia; 16 in Asia; 98 total
- Box office: $3,991,779 ($9.16 million in 2025 dollars)

Paula Abdul concert chronology
- Club MTV Live (1989); Under My Spell Tour (1991–92); Total Package Tour (2017)

The Under My Spell Tour was the debut headlining concert tour by American recording artist Paula Abdul. The tour supports her second studio album Spellbound (1991). The tour began in October 1991 and ran for nearly 100 shows in North America, Australia, and Asia.

During the Asian leg of the Under My Spell Tour, Abdul notably became the first Western female pop star to have a concert in China, playing a show in Guangzhou.

== Broadcasts and recordings ==
The shows at the Yokohama Arena in Japan were released on VHS and LaserDisc in 1993. The concerts aired on local television in Japan and on Disney Channel in the United States.

== Opening act ==
- Color Me Badd (North America)
- Aftershock (North America—Leg 1, select dates)

== Setlist ==
The following setlist was obtained from the concert held on August 1, 1992; at the Allentown Fairgrounds Grandstand in Allentown, Pennsylvania. It does not represent all shows for the duration of the tour.

1. "Spellbound"
2. "Straight Up"
3. "The Promise of a New Day"
4. "Vibeology"
5. "Opposites Attract"
6. "Will You Marry Me?"
7. "U"
8. "Blowing Kisses in the Wind"
9. "Rush Rush"
10. "(It's Just) The Way That You Love Me"
11. "Cold Hearted"
12. "Forever Your Girl"

On select dates, like the filmed show in Yokohama, "Alright Tonight" was played in the encore before "Forever Your Girl", while "Will You Marry Me?" was cut.

== Tour dates ==
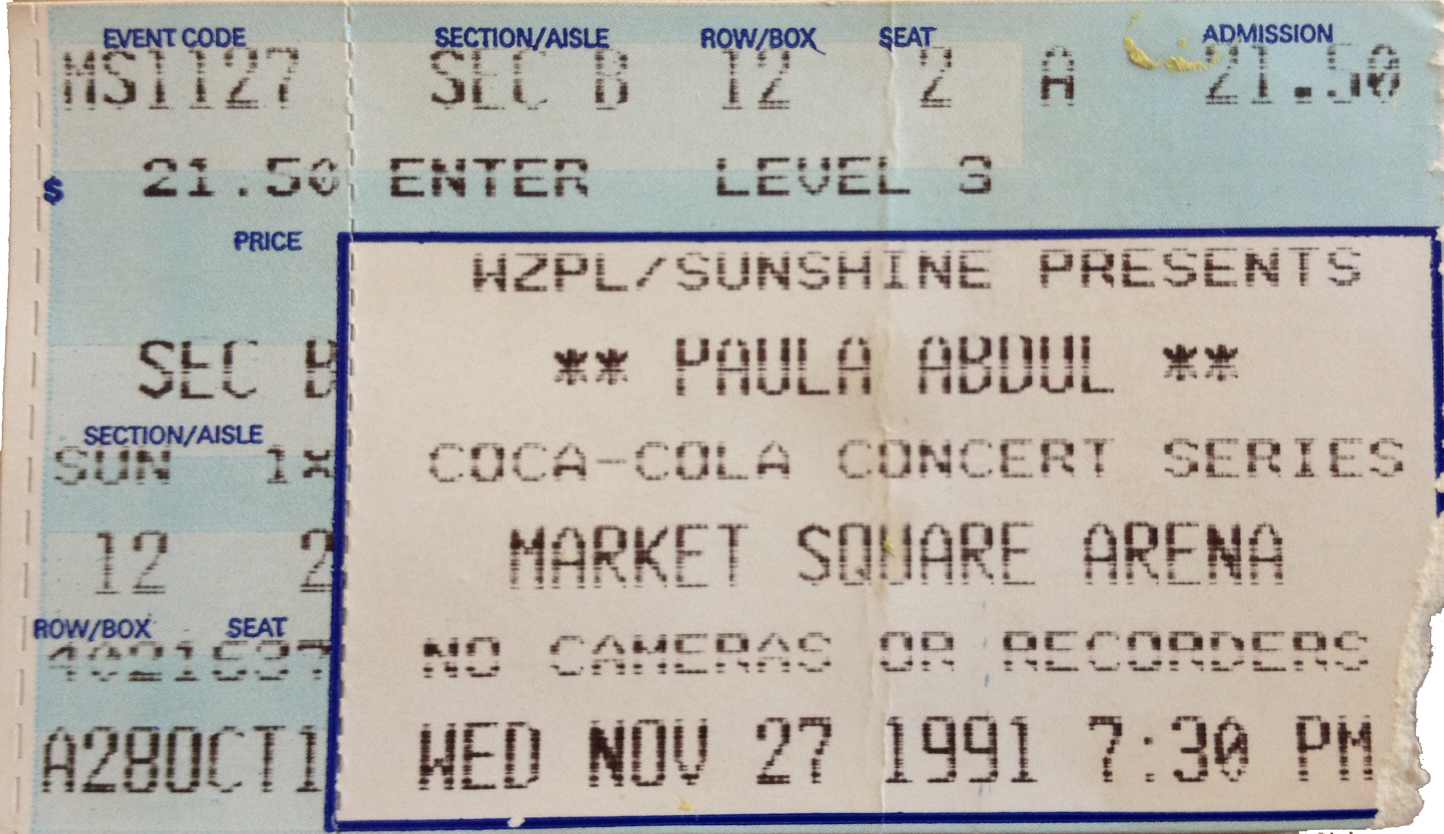
Ticket for the November 27, 1991, concert in Indianapolis.

Date	City	Country	Venue
North America
October 26, 1991	Birmingham	United States	BJCC Coliseum
October 28, 1991	Orlando	United States	Orlando Arena
October 31, 1991	Pensacola	United States	Pensacola Civic Center
November 1, 1991	Atlanta	United States	Omni Coliseum
November 3, 1991	Miami	United States	Miami Arena
November 5, 1991	Greensboro	United States	Greensboro Coliseum
November 6, 1991	Charlotte	United States	Charlotte Coliseum
November 7, 1991	Pittsburgh	United States	Civic Arena
November 8, 1991	Auburn Hills	United States	The Palace of Auburn Hills
November 9, 1991	Auburn Hills	United States	The Palace of Auburn Hills
November 11, 1991	Richfield	United States	Richfield Coliseum
November 13, 1991	Hartford	United States	Hartford Civic Center
November 14, 1991	Worcester	United States	Worcester Centrum
November 15, 1991	Worcester	United States	Worcester Centrum
November 17, 1991	Uniondale	United States	Nassau Veterans Memorial Coliseum
November 18, 1991	East Rutherford	United States	Brendan Byrne Arena
November 20, 1991	Albany	United States	Knickerbocker Arena
November 21, 1991	Landover	United States	Capital Centre
November 23, 1991	Toronto	Canada	SkyDome
November 24, 1991	Buffalo	United States	Buffalo Memorial Auditorium
November 26, 1991	Rosemont	United States	Rosemont Horizon
November 27, 1991	Indianapolis	United States	Market Square Arena
November 29, 1991	Milwaukee	United States	Bradley Center
November 30, 1991	Minneapolis	United States	Target Center
December 3, 1991	Salt Lake City	United States	Delta Center
December 5, 1991	Inglewood	United States	Great Western Forum
December 6, 1991	Inglewood	United States	Great Western Forum
December 7, 1991	Inglewood	United States	Great Western Forum
December 9, 1991	Phoenix	United States	Arizona Veterans Memorial Coliseum
December 13, 1991	Oakland	United States	Oakland–Alameda County Coliseum Arena
December 14, 1991	Sacramento	United States	ARCO Arena
December 15, 1991	Oakland	United States	Oakland–Alameda County Coliseum Arena
December 17, 1991	San Diego	United States	San Diego Sports Arena
December 19, 1991	Vancouver	Canada	Pacific Coliseum
Austraiia
January 24, 1992	Sydney	Australia	Hordern Pavilion
January 26, 1992	Brisbane	Australia	Brisbane Festival Hall
January 28, 1992	Melbourne	Australia	Festival Hall
January 29, 1992	Adelaide	Australia	Memorial Drive Park
January 31, 1992	Perth	Australia	Perth Superdrome
February 2, 1992	Auckland	New Zealand	Logan Campbell Centre
Asia
February 5, 1992	Osaka	Japan	Osaka-jō Hall
February 6, 1992	Osaka	Japan	Osaka-jō Hall
February 8, 1992	Yokohama	Japan	Yokohama Arena
February 9, 1992	Yokohama	Japan	Yokohama Arena
February 12, 1992	Tokyo	Japan	Nippon Budokan
February 13, 1992	Tokyo	Japan	Nippon Budokan
February 14, 1992	Tokyo	Japan	Nippon Budokan
February 21, 1992	Kallang	Singapore	Singapore Indoor Stadium
February 22, 1992	Kuala Lumpur	Malaysia	Stadium Negara
February 24, 1992	Guangzhou	China	Tianhe Stadium
February 26, 1992	Kowloon	Hong Kong	Hong Kong Coliseum
February 28, 1992	Manila	Philippines	Folk Arts Theater
February 29, 1992	Manila	Philippines	Folk Arts Theater
March 1, 1992	Manila	Philippines	Folk Arts Theater
March 2, 1992	Manila	Philippines	Folk Arts Theater
March 5, 1992	Seoul	South Korea	Jamsil Arena
North America
April 29, 1992	Vancouver	Canada	Pacific Coliseum
May 1, 1992	Tacoma	United States	Tacoma Dome
May 3, 1992	Edmonton	Canada	Northlands Coliseum
May 4, 1992	Calgary	Canada	Olympic Saddledome
May 6, 1992	Winnipeg	Canada	Winnipeg Arena
May 9, 1992	Montreal	Canada	Montreal Forum
May 14, 1992	Raleigh	United States	Hardee's Walnut Creek Amphitheatre
May 16, 1992	Charlotte	United States	The Paladium
May 17, 1992	Knoxville	United States	Knoxville Civic Coliseum
May 19, 1992	Maryland Heights	United States	Riverport Amphitheatre
May 21, 1992	Nashville	United States	Starwood Amphitheatre
May 22, 1992	New Orleans	United States	Lakefront Arena
May 23, 1992	Biloxi	United States	Mississippi Coast Coliseum
May 24, 1992	Mobile	United States	Mobile Civic Center
May 28, 1992	Miami	United States	Bayfront Park Amphitheater
May 29, 1992	St. Petersburg	United States	Florida Suncoast Dome
May 30, 1992	Tallahassee	United States	Tallahassee-Leon County Civic Center
June 1, 1992	Atlanta	United States	Coca-Cola Lakewood Amphitheatre
June 5, 1992	Dallas	United States	Coca-Cola Starplex Amphitheatre
June 6, 1992	The Woodlands	United States	Cynthia Woods Mitchell Pavilion
June 8, 1992	Phoenix	United States	Desert Sky Pavilion
June 10, 1992	Greenwood Village	United States	Fiddler's Green Amphitheatre
June 23, 1992	Spokane	United States	Spokane Coliseum
June 24, 1992	Portland	United States	Memorial Coliseum
June 26, 1992	Mountain View	United States	Shoreline Amphitheatre
June 27, 1992^{[A]}	Sacramento	United States	Cal Expo Amphitheatre
June 28, 1992^{[B]}	Costa Mesa	United States	Pacific Amphitheatre
July 5, 1992^{[C]}	Milwaukee	United States	Marcus Amphitheater
July 7, 1992	Noblesville	United States	Deer Creek Music Center
July 8, 1992	Cuyahoga Falls	United States	Blossom Music Center
July 10, 1992	Hoffman Estates	United States	Poplar Creek Music Theater
July 22, 1992	Philadelphia	United States	Spectrum
July 24, 1992	Atlantic City	United States	Etess Arena
July 25, 1992	Mansfield	United States	Great Woods Center for the Performing Arts
July 26, 1992	Saratoga Springs	United States	Saratoga Performing Arts Center
July 28, 1992	Wantagh	United States	Jones Beach Marine Theater
July 29, 1992	Wantagh	United States	Jones Beach Marine Theater
August 1, 1992^{[D]}	Allentown	United States	Allentown Fairgrounds Grandstand
August 4, 1992	Burgettstown	United States	Coca-Cola Star Lake Amphitheater
August 5, 1992	Columbia	United States	Merriweather Post Pavilion
August 7, 1992	Holmdel	United States	Garden State Arts Center
August 10, 1992	Agawam	United States	Riverside Park

Festivals and other miscellaneous performances
^{A} This concert was a part of the "California Exposition and State Fair"
^{B} This concert was a part of the "Orange County Fair"
^{C} This concert was a part of "Summerfest"
^{D} This concert was a part of the "Great Allentown Fair"

Cancellations and rescheduled shows

June 11, 1992	Salt Lake City, Utah	Delta Center	Cancelled
June 13, 1992	Albuquerque, New Mexico	Tingley Coliseum	Cancelled
June 16, 1992	Oklahoma City	MCC Arena	Cancelled
June 18, 1992	Las Vegas	Thomas & Mack Center	Cancelled
July 10, 1992	Pueblo, Colorado	Colorado State Fair Events Center	Cancelled
July 12, 1992	Clarkston, Michigan	Pine Knob Music Theatre	Cancelled
July 30, 1992	Stanhope, New Jersey	The Fields at Waterloo	Cancelled
July 31, 1992	Buffalo, New York	Pilot Field	Cancelled

=== Box office score data ===
Venue	City	Tickets sold / Available	Gross revenue
Civic Arena	Pittsburgh	11,774 / 11,774 (100%)	$264,923
The Palace of Auburn Hills	Auburn Hills	26,997 / 26,997 (100%)	$607,433
Centrum in Worcester	Worcester	20,700 / 20,700 (100%)	$442,986
Brendan Byrne Arena	East Rutherford	16,771 / 16,771 (100%)	$337,715
SkyDome	Toronto	13,972 / 15,017 (93%)	$314,873
Rosemont Horizon	Rosemont	12,509 / 14,545 (86%)	$318,895
Great Western Forum	Inglewood	39,406 / 39,406 (100%)	$933,885
Olympic Saddledome	Calgary	9,387 / 12,809 (73%)	$228,714
Jones Beach Marine Theater	Wantagh	19,030 / 21,400 (89%)	$542,355
TOTAL		170,546 / 79,419 (95%)	$3,991,779
