= Cubic 22 =

Cubic 22 were a Belgian electronic music project, made up of producers, Peter Ramson (AKA Jos Borremans), a veteran of the new beat era, and Danny Van Wauwe, who also went on to issue material under various pseudonyms.

The duo were a part of the burgeoning house music scene that was starting to become popular in the UK, and released many songs prior to hitting it big with their sole single success.

That track, "Night in Motion", crossed over from the clubs to the pop chart in June 1991, eventually peaking at #15 after only three weeks. The group appeared on Top of the Pops on June 27, 1991. This would be the last of the group's singles to chart on the UK Singles Chart, however they charted many more songs on the UK Dance Chart.

"Night in Motion" is featured in Dance Dance Revolution 4th Mix and Dance Dance Revolution Ultramix 2 as a playable song. The main synth hook of the track was sampled and reproduced in Strike's mid-90s house chart hit U Sure Do.

== Singles ==
"Night in Motion", UK #15, 6 July 1991
