= Donna Allen (singer) =

American singer

- Born: May 15, 1958 (age 68); Tampa, Florida
- Origin: Key West, Florida, U.S.
- Genres: R&B, new jack swing, dance-pop, freestyle
- Years active: 1986–2003, 2013–2016, 2020–2021
- Website: donnaallen.com (defunct)

Donna Allen (born May 15, 1958) is an American dance-pop singer, born in Key West, Florida, and raised in Tampa. At one point a cheerleader for the Tampa Bay Buccaneers, she got her start performing in the bands Hi-Octane, Trama and Maxx. During her tenure with Maxx she was courted by Alan Walden (Capricorn Records/Hustler Productions) before launching a solo career. She also sang backup on tour for Gloria Estefan for nine years.

== Career ==
Allen's first disc was the Lou Pace-produced 1986 album, Perfect Timing, and over the next few years she launched several hits on the US Billboard Hot Dance/Club Play chart.

She had two top 10 hits on the UK Singles Chart with "Serious" (1987, #8) and "Joy and Pain" (1989, #10). 1995's "Real", her last US chart hit, was taken from the soundtrack to the Sylvester Stallone film The Specialist.

The UK dance act Strike used her chorus hook line from "Serious", as the basis for their club hit, "U Sure Do" released in 1994. Allen provided the vocals to Soulsearcher's 2003 single "Feelin' Love". "He Is the Joy" appeared on the Precious soundtrack (2009).

=== The Voice ===
In 2013, she made an attempted comeback by competing in Season 5 of NBC's singing competition, The Voice. On the inaugural day of the season, broadcast on September 23, 2013, she performed Joe Cocker's song "You Are So Beautiful" with two of the four judges, namely Adam Levine and Christina Aguilera, hitting their "I Want You" button and turning their chairs. Allen opted to be in Team Adam for the season. During the Battle Rounds, she was defeated by fellow Team Adam teammate Tessanne Chin, the eventual winner of Season 5.

Stage	Song	Original Artist	Date	Order	Result
Blind Audition	"You Are So Beautiful"	Joe Cocker	September 23, 2013	1.3	Adam Levine and Christina Aguilera turned Joined Team Adam
Battle Rounds	"Next to Me" (vs. Tessanne Chin)	Emeli Sandé	October 14, 2013	7.5	Defeated

== Discography ==
=== Studio albums ===
Year	Title	Label	Chart positions	
Year	Title	Label	US	US R&B
1986	Perfect Timing	21 Records	133	33
1988	Heaven on Earth	Oceana Records	—	28
2015	I'm Your Bride	Self-released	—	—
"—" denotes the release did not chart.

=== Compilation albums ===
- The Best of Donna Allen (BCM Records, 1993)

=== Singles ===
Year	Title	Chart positions					Album
Year	Title	US	US R&B	US Dance	US Dance Sales	UK	Album
1986	"Serious"	21	5	—	17	8	Perfect Timing
1987	"Satisfied"	—	14	33	—	92	Perfect Timing
1987	"Sweet Somebody"	—	55	48	—	111	Perfect Timing
1988	"Heaven on Earth"	—	19	—	—	—	Heaven on Earth
1989	"Joy and Pain"	—	3	—	25	10	Heaven on Earth
1989	"Can We Talk?"	—	43	—	—	80	Heaven on Earth
1995	"Real"	—	—	23	—	34	The Specialist Soundtrack
1996	"Saturday" (East 57th Street featuring Donna Allen)	—	—	—	—	29	—N/a
1999	"He Is the Joy"	—	—	—	—	—	—N/a
2002	"Sugar" (Deepstar featuring Donna Allen)	—	—	—	—	—	—N/a
2003	"Feelin' Love" (Soulsearcher featuring Donna Allen)	—	—	—	—	—	—N/a
2013	"You Are So Beautiful"	—	—	—	—	—	—N/a
2015	"He's Got the Power"	—	—	—	—	—	I'm Your Bride
2016	"Thank You DJ's"	—	—	—	—	—	—N/a
2016	"Ain't Coming Back" (Jay Jones featuring Donna Allen)	—	—	—	—	—	—N/a
2020	"Love Keeps Shining"	—	—	—	—	—	—N/a
2020	"Can't Fake Love" (Lázaro Rodriguez & Travis Gibb featuring Donna Allen)	—	—	—	—	—	—N/a
2021	"Tell Me Why"	—	—	—	—	—	—N/a
"—" denotes releases that did not chart or were not released in that territory.
