= U Sure Do =

1994 single by Strike

Single by Strike

from the album I Saw the Future
- Released: December 1994
- Genre: Dance-pop; disco; handbag house
- Length: 4:59 (album version); 3:50 (Strike's 7-inch mix)
- Label: Fresh
- Songwriters: Andy Gardner; Matt Cantor
- Producers: Andy Gardner; Matt Cantor

Strike singles chronology
"Formula One" (1994)	"U Sure Do" (1994)	"My Love is for Real" (1996)

Music video
- "U Sure Do" on YouTube

"U Sure Do" is a song by British dance music group Strike. The track samples Donna Allen's vocals from her 1986 song "Serious" and the main synth from Cubic 22's 1991 song "Night in Motion". Released in December 1994 by Fresh Records, "U Sure Do" reached number 31 on the UK Singles Chart. The song was a big UK club hit, and after receiving regular play in clubs throughout 1994 and 1995, it was re-released and re-entered the UK chart in April 1995, reaching number four. It also peaked at number one on the UK Dance Singles Chart. On British music television channel The Box, it was a Box Top for 4 weeks. In 1997, it was featured on the group's only album, I Saw the Future.

In 1999, "U Sure Do" was remixed and released as "U Sure Do '99". This version peaked at number 53 in the UK. In 2006, it was remixed a third time and released to a handful of DJs solely for club use. MTV Dance ranked the song number 45 in their list of 'The 100 Biggest 90's Dance Anthems of All Time' in 2011.

== Critical reception ==
Vicki Petrovska from Australian The Age noted the "hypnotic, pumping beat" of the song, adding, "Check it out." Larry Flick from Billboard magazine described it as "instantly memorable". In his weekly UK chart commentary, James Masterton wrote upon the 1994 release, "More dance and more recycling of past riffs and hooks. 'U Sure Do' is based around Donna Allen's 1987 Top 10 hit 'Serious'. The original is a dancefloor classic. This one isn't." Simon Price from Melody Maker named it "Strike's titanium/titanic 'U Sure Do'".

Electronic dance and clubbing magazine Mixmag remarked, "Very large handbag appeal indeed." A reviewer from Music & Media commented, "The keyboard intro could've been Todd Rundgren's 'Can We Still Be Friends' at double speed. But then the enthusiastic ladies start singing their ready-to-use-on-air pop dance one liner." Alan Jones from Music Week wrote, "A powerful house track propelled by its Donna Allen sample, it's now in new mixes, but it's the original that brings home the bacon." James Hamilton from the Record Mirror Dance Update called it a "useful if somewhat sparse Madonna pastiche featuring plaintive Victoria Newton in 'let's do it' prodded" tune and a "disco bounder" in his weekly dance column.

== Chart performance ==
"U Sure Do" reached the top 10 in the United Kingdom as well as on the Eurochart Hot 100, where it reached number 10 in its first week on the chart. In the UK, the single stayed on the UK Singles Chart for seven weeks before peaking at number four during its second run on the chart, on 9 April 1995. On the UK Dance Chart, it peaked at number one. It also topped the club charts in DJ magazine and Mixmag. Additionally, "U Sure Do" was a top-20 hit in Ireland, Italy and the Netherlands, and a top-30 hit in Iceland. Outside Europe, it was a top-10 hit in Australia, peaking at number nine and spending a total of 16 weeks within the ARIA Singles Chart between June and October 1995. In West Asia, it became a top-20 hit in Israel, peaking at number 16 on 25 April 1995. The single earned a gold record in the UK, with a sale of 400,000 units.

== Legacy ==
In 2011, MTV Dance ranked "U Sure Do" number 45 in their list of "The 100 Biggest 90's Dance Anthems of All Time". In 2016, Attitude magazine ranked it number four in their list of "The Top 10 Dance Tunes of the '90s". Robert Dimery included it in his book 1001 Songs: You Must Hear Before You Die. In 2025, music magazine Classic Pop ranked "U Sure Do" number nine in their list of "Top 20 80s Sampling Hits".

== Track listing ==
- 12-inch, UK (Fresh Records / FRSHT19)
1. "U Sure Do" (Guest List Mix)
2. "U Sure Do" (Formula 2 Mix)
- 12-inch, UK (Fresh Records / FRSHTX19)
1. "U Sure Do" (Strike's Raise The Roof Remix)
2. "U Sure Do" (Goodfella's Remix)
3. "U Sure Do" (Mr Roys Jinx Remix)
- 12-inch - The Remixes, France (Versailles 661300 8)
1. "U Sure Do" (Goodfellas Mix) — 7:28
2. "U Sure Do" (Raise The Roof Mix) — 7:10
3. "U Sure Do" (Mr Roy's Mix) — 7:10
4. "U Sure Do" (Guest List Mix) — 7:32
- CD single, Netherlands (Royal Records 2002027)
1. "U Sure Do" (Strike 7" Mix) — 3:50
2. "U Sure Do" (Guest List Mix) — 7:25
3. "U Sure Do" (Formula 2 Mix) — 7:26
4. "U Sure Do" (Daydream Remix By Robin-Jaydee-Albers) — 8:32
- CD maxi-single, UK (Fresh Records / FRSHD19)
1. "U Sure Do" (Strike 7" Mix) — 3:53
2. "U Sure Do" (Guest List Mix) — 7:28
3. "U Sure Do" (Formula 2 Mix) — 7:26
- Cassette, UK (Fresh Records / FRSHC19)
1. "U Sure Do" (Strike 7" Mix)
2. "U Sure Do" (Formula 2 Mix)

== Charts ==
=== Weekly charts ===
Chart (1994–1995)	Peak position
Australia (ARIA)	9
Europe (Eurochart Hot 100)	10
Europe (European Dance Radio)	3
Europe (European Hit Radio)	26
Iceland (Íslenski Listinn Topp 40)	22
Ireland (IRMA)	20
Israel (Israeli Singles Chart)	16
Italy (Musica e dischi)	18
Netherlands (Dutch Top 40)	13
Netherlands (Single Top 100)	15
Scotland (OCC)	7
UK Singles (OCC)	4
UK Dance (OCC)	1
UK Club Chart (DJ)	1
UK Club Chart (Mixmag)	1
UK Airplay (Music Week)	17
UK Club Chart (Music Week)	2
UK Pop Tip Club Chart (Music Week)	1

Chart (1999)	Peak position
Scotland (OCC)	71
UK Singles (OCC)	53
UK Dance (OCC)	40

=== Year-end charts ===
Chart (1994)	Position
UK Club Chart (Music Week)	15

Chart (1995)	Position
Australia (ARIA)	70
Netherlands (Dutch Top 40)	122
UK Singles (OCC)	61
UK Pop Tip Club Chart (Music Week)	4

Chart (1996)	Position
UK Club Chart (Music Week) with "Inspiration"	44
UK Pop Tip Club Chart (Music Week) with "Inspiration"	7

== Certifications ==
Region	Certification	Certified units/sales
United Kingdom (BPI)	Platinum	600,000^{‡}
^{‡} Sales+streaming figures based on certification alone.
