= I Have Peace =

Single by Strike

from the album I Saw the Future
- B-side: "Remix"
- Released: 1997
- Genre: Dance; breakbeat; hip hop
- Length: 3:55
- Label: Fresh Records
- Songwriters: Andy Gardner; Karl Gordon; Mark King; Matt Cantor; Phil Gould; Wally Badarou
- Producer: Strike

Strike singles chronology
"My Love is for Real" (1996)	"I Have Peace" (1997)

Music video
- "I Have Peace" on YouTube

"I Have Peace" is a song by British dance music band Strike, released in 1997 by Fresh Records as the fifth and final single from the band's only album, I Saw the Future (1997). Victoria Newton performs the vocals and the rap parts are by K. The song became the band's second highest charting hit, peaking at number 17 on the UK Singles Chart and number 11 on the UK Dance Singles Chart. Additionally, it was a top-30 hit in Scotland and a top-40 hit in Switzerland. The original version contains a sample of the 1985 song "Leaving Me Now" by Level 42.

== Critical reception ==
Pan-European magazine Music & Media wrote, "Strike unveil a new single and new sound this week with 'I Have Peace', on U.K. label Fresh. This instantly appealing song is a male-voiced rap track, featuring light piano and a female sung chorus. A highly melodic and gospel influenced singalong number." A reviewer from Music Week gave the song a score of four out of five, adding, "Not as instant as their previous released, this represents Strike's most distinctive single yet, moving from a dreamy piano opening into a laidback, rap/gospel-influenced dance groove."

== Track listing ==
- 12" single, UK (1997)
1. "I Have Peace" (Original Mix)
2. "I Have Peace" (Uno Clio Vocal Mix)
3. "I Have Peace" (Forthright Club Mix)
4. "I Have Peace" (Strike's Late Late Mix)
- CD single, UK (1997)
1. "I Have Peace" (Original Mix) — 3:55
2. "I Have Peace" (Forthright 7" Edit) — 3:55
3. "I Have Peace" (Uno Clio 12" Mix) — 8:26
4. "I Have Peace" (L.F.A. Mix) — 3:56
5. "I Have Peace" (K-Gee Mix) — 3:47
6. "I Have Peace" (Strike's Late Late Mix) — 8:00
7. "I Have Peace" (Uno Clio Dub) — 7:46
- CD maxi, Netherlands (1997)
1. "I Have Peace" (Forthright 7" Edit) — 3:50
2. "I Have Peace" (Original Mix) — 5:52
3. "I Have Peace" (Uno Clio 12" Mix) — 8:25
4. "I Have Peace" (L.F.A. Mix) — 3:54
5. "I Have Peace" (K-Gee Mix) — 3:44
6. "I Have Peace" (Strike's Late Late Mix) — 8:02

== Charts ==
Chart (1997)	Peak position
Europe (Eurochart Hot 100)	62
Germany (GfK)	55
Israel (Israeli Singles Chart)	16
Scotland (OCC)	26
Switzerland (Schweizer Hitparade)	34
UK Singles (OCC)	17
UK Dance (Official Charts)	11
UK Airplay (Music Week)	41
