= I Saw the Future =

Studio album by Strike
- Released: 1997
- Genre: Dance; house
- Label: Fresh

Professional ratings
Review scores
Source	Rating
Music Week	4/5 stars

I Saw the Future is the 1997 debut and only album by British electronic dance music group Strike, which was formed in 1994 consisting of Matt Cantor (later of Freestylers), Andy Gardner (later of Plump DJs) and vocalist Victoria Newton. It features their hit singles "U Sure Do", "My Love Is for Real" and "I Have Peace". The album peaked at number 155 on the UK Albums Chart.

== Critical reception ==
British magazine Music Week rated the album four out of five, writing, "This bouncy debut album contains ail the hit singles, including U Sure Do, and some fine new tracks in an uplifting journey through house, gospel, rap and their own breakbeat style."

== Track listing ==
1. "Intro"
2. "I Have Peace"
3. "I Saw the Future"
4. "The Morning After"
5. "Inspiration"
6. "Come with Me"
7. "U Sure Do"
8. "Wrapped Inside the Rhythm"
9. "My Love Is for Real"
10. "Shut It"
11. "No Compromise"
12. "Live for Today"
