= Trisha Covington =

American singer

Trisha Covington (born in Cleveland, Ohio) is an American R&B singer who scored a top 30 US R&B hit, with her debut 1994 single entitled "Why You Wanna Play Me Out?".

Covington was signed to Columbia Records in 1993. Her follow-up single, "Slow Down," produced by Marc Nelson and Kyle West, reached number 79 on the US R&B chart. That year also saw the release of her only album, Call Me. However, she was dropped from the label before releasing any more material, in part due to the minimal success of her debut effort.

She was also known in the entertainment industry for singing background for other artists, including Will Smith, Beyoncé and Toni Braxton.

In 2008, she appeared on Randy Jackson's compilation album Randy Jackson's Music Club, Volume 1, featuring on the song "What Am I So Afraid Of?" alongside Keke Wyatt and Kiley Dean.

In 2011, she was reportedly working on a new album, releasing several recently recorded songs online via social media. She also went on tour to Africa with Jermaine Jackson, as well as appeared in various shows thereafter.

In 2022, she began releasing singles independently.

== Discography ==
=== Albums ===
- Call Me (1994)

=== Singles ===
Year	Title	US	US R&B	Album
1994	"Why You Wanna Play Me Out?"	103	26	Call Me
1994	"Slow Down"	-	79	Call Me
