= Dance Like There's No Tomorrow =

Single by Paula Abdul and Randy Jackson

from the album Randy Jackson's Music Club, Vol. 1
- Released: January 18, 2008
- Length: 3:01
- Label: Concord
- Songwriters: Edwin "Lil Eddie" Serrano; Shae Patrick Skinner; Eritza Laues
- Producers: Deekay; Randy Jackson

Paula Abdul singles chronology
"Ain't Never Gonna Give You Up" (1996)	"Dance Like There's No Tomorrow" (2008)	"I'm Just Here for the Music" (2009)

"Dance Like There's No Tomorrow" is a song by American singer Paula Abdul and American musician Randy Jackson. At the time, both were judges on the American reality competition series American Idol. Produced by Jackson and DEEKAY, it was released on January 18, 2008, as the lead single for Jackson's compilation album Randy Jackson's Music Club, Vol. 1. The single served as Abdul's first release in twelve years.

"Dance Like There's No Tomorrow" was a minor success in the United States, reaching number 62 on the Hot 100 chart, and number two on the Billboard Dance Club Songs component chart. The single saw less success outside the United States, charting only in Canada and Romania.

== Background and release ==
The song premiered on KIIS FM in Los Angeles on January 18, 2008. It is the first single off Randy Jackson's debut album, Music Club: Volume 1 (2008).

By March 2008, the song sold 189,000 digital downloads.

== Live performance ==
A pre-taped performance by Abdul aired during the pre-game show for Super Bowl XLII. Abdul performed a dance routine with several back-up dancers while lip-syncing, and Jackson played bass guitar with the band. The performance received mixed reviews, with Jim Cantiello from MTV writing, "it certainly looked like she was lip-syncing Cotillard-style. But I have to admit, I thought she nailed it." Conversely, another MTV review stated, "The painfully '80s Janet Jackson rip-off tune and skinny-tie-era backup dancers made Abdul look like the Mrs. Robinson of dance pop. Judging those kids on 'Idol' just got a lot harder."

== Music video ==
A music video directed by Abdul and Scott Speer was filmed on January 21, 2008. Abdul also choreographed the video with Rey Lozano. Abdul and Jackson's American Idol co-judge Simon Cowell, and show host Ryan Seacrest, made cameo appearances in the video.

Prior to its release, speculation rose that MTV banned the video. However, the network denied these claims.

== Chart performance ==
Chart (2008)	Peak position
Canada (Canadian Hot 100)	68
Romania (Romanian Top 100)	87
US Billboard Hot 100	62
US Adult Contemporary (Billboard)	29
US Dance Club Songs (Billboard)	2

== Release history ==
Release dates and formats for "Dance Like There's No Tomorrow"
Region	Date	Format	Label(s)	Ref.
United States	January 29, 2008	Mainstream airplay	Concord	
