= Randy Jackson's Music Club, Vol. 1 =

Studio album by Randy Jackson
- Released: March 11, 2008
- Recorded: 2007–2008
- Genre: Pop, dance-pop, hip hop, R&B
- Label: Dream Merchant 21/Concord
- Producer: Randy Jackson, John Burk

Singles from Randy Jackson's Music Club, Vol. 1
- 1. "Dance Like There's No Tomorrow" Released: January 22, 2008; 2. "Real Love" Released: April 21, 2008

Professional ratings
Review scores
Source	Rating
AllMusic	2.5/5 stars
Billboard	(Favorable)

Randy Jackson's Music Club, Vol. 1 is the debut studio album by record producer Randy Jackson. The album was released on March 11, 2008. Jackson himself did not sing on the songs on Music Club, but he did produce them all.

== Sales and chart performance ==
The album debuted at number 50 on the Billboard 200 albums chart, selling about 13,000 copies in its first week.

== Track listing ==
1. "Dance Like There's No Tomorrow" (Edwin "Lil Eddie" Serrano, Shae Patrick Skinner, Eritza Laues) (produced with DEEKAY) - performed by Paula Abdul
2. "Just Walk On By" (Burt Bacharach, Hal David, Jay E, Joss Stone) - performed by Joss Stone*
3. "What Am I So Afraid Of?" (Carman Michelle, Curtis Wilson) - performed by Keke Wyatt, Trisha Covington and Kiley Dean
4. "Like A" (Monyea Crawford, Richard Rollie, Crunk Squad) - performed by Crunk Squad featuring Ghostface Killah
5. "Who's Gonna Love You Now" (Kelli Love, Rich King, Mirella Castellano) (produced with Kelli Love and J.R. Rotem) - performed by Kelli Love
6. "Wang Dang Doodle" (Willie Dixon) - performed by Sam Moore, Keb' Mo', Angie Stone and Frédéric Yonnet
7. "Something to Believe In" (Tom Leonard, Lindy Robbins, Jess Cates) - performed by Jason Mraz, Van Hunt and Jon McLaughlin
8. "Home" (Michael Bublé, Alan Chang, Amy Foster-Gillies) - performed by John Rich & Anthony Hamilton
9. "My R&B" (Johannes Rikard Jørgensen, Daniel Dicky Klein) - performed by Barbi Esco
10. "Real Love" (Lee Ryan, Ash Howes, Martin Harrington) - performed by Katharine McPhee and Elliott Yamin
11. "Willing to Try" (Richie Sambora, John M. Shanks) - performed by Richie Sambora, Travis Tritt and Lucy Woodward
12. "I Understand" - performed by BeBe Winans, Kim Burrell, Rance Allen, Mariah Carey and Hezekiah Walker & The Love Fellowship Tabernacle Church Choir
13. "We're an American Band" (Don Brewer) - performed by Aly & AJ (iTunes and Walmart bonus track)
14. "When I Fall in Love" - performed by Brian McKnight (Walmart exclusive bonus track)

*This song was originally supposed to feature Three 6 Mafia in addition to Joss Stone, but the rap trio was taken off the song.

== Singles ==
The first single from the album was "Dance Like There's No Tomorrow" by Paula Abdul. The song debuted on On Air with Ryan Seacrest on January 18, 2008. "Real Love" became the second single released from the album, due to its high level of popularity on iTunes. It was released to the AC charts on April 21, 2008, and the Billboard Hot 100 April 29, 2008.

Jackson's production of "I Understand" received a Grammy Award nomination in 2009 for Best Gospel Performance.

== Cover versions ==
- "Real Love" is a cover of the Lee Ryan song, using the male/female structure of the Trinity Stone featuring Ne-Yo cover
- "Wang Dang Doodle" is a Howlin' Wolf cover
- "I Understand" is a Smokie Norful cover
- "Willing to Try" is a Bo Bice cover
- "Home" is a Michael Bublé cover
- "We're an American Band" is a Grand Funk Railroad cover
