= I'm Just Here for the Music =

Single by Paula Abdul
- Released: May 5, 2009
- Genre: Electronic
- Length: 3:13
- Label: Filament; Caroline
- Songwriters: Danielle Brisebois; Wayne Rodrigues
- Producer: Oliver Leiber

Paula Abdul singles chronology
"Dance Like There's No Tomorrow" (2008)	"I'm Just Here for the Music" (2009)

"I'm Just Here for the Music" is a song by American singer and entertainer Paula Abdul. The track was written by Danielle Brisebois and Wayne Rodrigues and produced by Oliver Leiber, who had produced a majority of Abdul's debut studio album Forever Your Girl (1988). It succeeds Abdul's 2008 comeback single to music, "Dance Like There's No Tomorrow". It was released on May 5, 2009, as a standalone single via Filament Entertainment Group, a label distributed by Caroline Distribution.

== Background and release ==
The song was written by Danielle Brisebois, Wayne Rodrigues and produced by Oliver Leiber, who had a role producing Abdul's debut album Forever Your Girl. Abdul debuted the song on Ryan Seacrest's KIIS-FM radio show. The song uses an autotuner and electronic synthesizers over an uptempo electronic beat. The song was originally an unreleased song cut from Kylie Minogue's ninth album Body Language (2003). This is not the first time that Minogue and Abdul have exchanged tracks. In 2000, Minogue added the Abdul penned single "Spinning Around" to her 2000 album Light Years.

== Chart performance ==
"I'm Just Here for the Music" debuted at number 87 on the US Billboard Hot 100 on May 23, 2009 with first week sales of 25,000 digital downloads, becoming her fifteenth entry. It fell to number 97 the following week before departing from the chart. To date, it is Abdul's last entry on the Billboard Hot 100.

== Live performance ==
In May 2009, Abdul performed the song on American Idol.

== Charts ==
Chart (2009)	Peak position
US Billboard Hot 100	87
