= Vibeology =

1991 single by Paula Abdul

Single by Paula Abdul

from the album Spellbound
- Released: October 21, 1991
- Studio: Studio Masters (Los Angeles)
- Genre: House; new jack swing
- Length: 5:16 (album version); 3:20 (video edit)
- Label: Virgin; Captive
- Songwriters: Peter Lord; Sandra St. Victor; V. Jeffrey Smith
- Producers: Peter Lord; V. Jeffrey Smith

Paula Abdul singles chronology
"Blowing Kisses in the Wind" (1991)	"Vibeology" (1991)	"Will You Marry Me?" (1992)

Alternative cover
- Australian single cover

Music video
- "Vibeology" on YouTube

"Vibeology" is a song by American singer Paula Abdul, taken from the singer's second studio album, Spellbound (1991). The house and new jack swing number was written by Peter Lord, Sandra St. Victor, and V. Jeffrey Smith and produced by Lord and Smith. It was first released on October 21, 1991, in Japan via Virgin Records and Abdul's vanity label Captive Records, becoming the album's fourth official single. In Europe and Australia, the track was released as the third single, as "Blowing Kisses in the Wind" was not released in the former region and would be released in the latter region following "Vibeology".

== Background ==
Originally, Virgin Records had intended to release "Vibeology" as the third single from Spellbound following Abdul's performance of the song at the 1991 MTV Video Music Awards; however, it was delayed in favor of "Blowing Kisses in the Wind" which was receiving airplay at the time, creating demand for the song.

== Critical reception ==
Slant Magazine's Eric Henderson, in a 2004 retrospective review for Spellbound, named "Vibeology" one of the two best tracks off the album, describing it as an "underappreciated departure" for Abdul and that it is "topped off with Betty Boop–channeling affectations in what is surely Abdul's most gutsy vocal performance." Henderson also said the track "introduced fans used to tasteful, precise beat to the concept of dance music as a balls-out freak party."

== Commercial performance ==
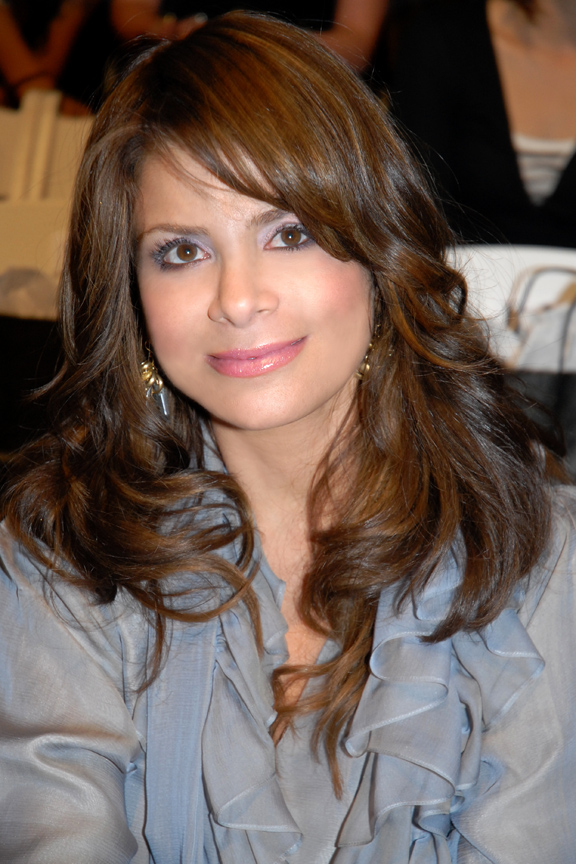
"Vibeology" broke Abdul's (pictured in 2007) streak of top-10 singles in the United States.

=== North America ===
"Vibeology" entered the US Billboard Hot 100 the week of January 18, 1992, at number 65, becoming the "Hot Shot Debut" of the week. Three weeks later, the track reached its peak position of number 16, breaking Abdul's streak of eight top-10 singles and becoming Abdul's first single to miss the top 10 in the US since the original release of "The Way That You Love Me" in 1988. It spent 14 weeks in total on the chart. "Vibeology" performed marginally better on component charts, peaking at number 17 on the Dance Club Play chart and number two on the 12-inch Singles Sales chart. It was the 34th-best-selling dance single of 1992.

=== UK and Europe ===
In the United Kingdom, "Vibeology" debuted on the UK Singles Chart the week of 12 January 1992, at number 29. One week later, the track reached number 19, where it would peak. It stayed there for two consecutive weeks and overall spent six weeks on the chart. It was Abdul's highest charting UK single since "Rush Rush" peaked at number six in early 1991. Elsewhere in Europe, the track entered the top 40 in the Netherlands, Ireland, Belgium (Flanders), and Switzerland; this led to a number-40 peak on the European Hot 100 Singles chart. "Vibeology" would achieve its greatest success on the European Dance Radio Chart, where it reached number three.

=== Australia ===
Following its November 18, 1991, release in Australia, "Vibeology" peaked at number 63 on the ARIA Singles Chart. In New Zealand, it debuted and peaked at number 50 on the RIANZ Singles Chart the week of March 29, 1992, and spent a single week on the chart.

== Music video ==
Stefan Würnitzer directed the video for "Vibeology"; he had previously directed the music video for "Rush Rush". It was filmed on December 10, 1991. A video edit was used and would later be released as the single edit; this version would also be included on her Greatest Hits (2000) collection. Two videos were made for "Vibeology", one for North America and another for Europe and Australasia. The music video was released to MTV on December 21, 1991, as an "Exclusive". It was shortly placed on heavy rotation.

=== Synopsis ===
The video for the North American version features Abdul and her dancers dancing in front of spotlights and red and white backdrops. During the chorus the word "Vibeology" scrolls across the screen with ghostly effects and at times Abdul herself is outlined with a white blur. For the international version, it was re-edited with clips of rehearsals of the Under My Spell Tour and was also utilized to cross-promote Abdul's tour.

== Track listings ==
All tracks were written by Peter Lord, Sandra St. Victor, and V. Jeffrey Smith.

- US 12-inch vinyl single
1. "Vibeology" (Hurley's House Mix) – 7:04
2. "Vibeology" (Hurley's Underground Mix) – 5:27
3. "Vibeology" (Silky Sax Dub) – 5:42
4. "Vibeology" (Underground Sax Dub) – 4:58
- European 7-inch vinyl single
1. "Vibeology" – 4:13
2. "Vibeology" (Hurley's House 7 Inch) – 3:39
- Australian maxi-CD single
1. "Vibeology" (Jeff & Pete 7" Edit) – 4:13
2. "Vibeology" (7" Keith Cohen Club Edit) – 3:30
3. "Vibeology" (Humphrey's Hip-Hop Radio Edit) – 3:47
4. "Vibeology" (Keith Cohen's House Mix) – 7:48
5. "Vibeology" (Humphrey's Hip-House Mix) – 5:40
6. "Vibeology" (Keith Cohen's Penthouse Dub) – 5:57
- US and Canadian cassette single
1. "Vibeology" (Jeff & Pete 7" Edit) – 4:13
2. "Vibeology" (Keith Cohen's Vibe the House Dub) – 5:53

== Personnel ==
Personnel are taken from the Spellbound booklet.

- V. Jeffrey Smith – production, arrangement, vocal arrangement, programming, keyboards, sax
- Peter Lord – production, arrangement, vocal arrangement, programming, keyboards, additional voices
- Sandra St. Victor – vocal arrangement, background vocals
- Paula Abdul – lead vocals
- The Family Stand – additional voices

== Charts ==
=== Weekly charts ===
Weekly chart performance for "Vibeology"
Chart (1991–1992)	Peak position
Australia (ARIA)	63
Belgium (Ultratop 50 Flanders)	30
Canada Retail Singles (The Record)	7
Canada Contemporary Hit Radio (The Record)	4
Canada Top Singles (RPM)	19
Europe (Eurochart Hot 100)	40
Europe (European Dance Radio)	3
Ireland (IRMA)	29
Netherlands (Dutch Top 40)	13
Netherlands (Single Top 100)	20
New Zealand (Recorded Music NZ)	50
Switzerland (Schweizer Hitparade)	31
UK Singles (Official Charts)	19
UK Airplay (Music Week)	6
UK Dance (Music Week)	16
UK Club Chart (Record Mirror)	21
US Billboard Hot 100	16
US Dance Club Songs (Billboard)	17
US Dance Singles Sales (Billboard)	2
US Cash Box Top 100	7
US Crossover (Gavin Report)	8
US Top 40 (Gavin Report)	10
US Contemporary Hit Radio (Radio & Records)	9

=== Year-end charts ===
Year-end chart performance for "Vibeology"
Chart (1992)	Position
US Maxi-Singles Sales (Billboard)	34

== Release history ==
Release dates and formats for "Vibeology"
Region	Date	Format(s)	Label(s)	Ref.
Japan	October 21, 1991	Mini-CD	Virgin; Captive	
Australia	November 18, 1991	7-inch vinyl; 12-inch vinyl; CD; cassette	Virgin	
United Kingdom	January 6, 1992	7-inch vinyl; 12-inch vinyl; CD; cassette	Virgin	
United States	January 21, 1992	7-inch vinyl; cassette single	Virgin	
