= Strike (band) =

British musical group

- Origin: London, England
- Genres: Eurodance, house
- Years active: 1994–2006
- Label: Fresh Records
- Members: Matt Cantor; Andy Gardner; Victoria Newton

Strike were a British electronic dance music group formed in 1994, consisting of Matt Cantor (later of Freestylers), Andy Gardner (later of Plump DJs) and vocalist Victoria Newton.

== Career ==
Strike formed towards the end of 1994. A chance vocal session for Victoria Newton at the studios of Fresh Records in Ladbroke Grove, landed her the role as the lead singer.

Strike's first single, "Formula One", entered the lower reaches of the UK top 100 chart. They did not break through until "U Sure Do" was released in December 1994, originally charting at number 31 in the UK Singles Chart, only to re-enter the chart and climb to number 4 in April 1995, due to the track becoming a major club hit. They then began to tour extensively, appearing on MTV and on television programs such as Top of the Pops and playing to audiences as large as 70,000. "U Sure Do" achieved chart success in many territories and this took the band to Spain, Italy, Denmark, Norway, the Netherlands, Germany and Japan.

Strike went on to produce another four UK top 40 hits, like their cover of Paula Abdul's "My Love Is for Real", and an album, I Saw the Future was released in 1997 on Fresh Records. They toured with and supported many international artists including the Backstreet Boys, Jocelyn Brown and the Spice Girls. As of 2006, Strike broke up.

== Victoria Newton ==
Newton was offered a solo recording contract with Strike's label, Fresh. In September 1999, she made her debut release with "Martha's Harbour", a cover of the All About Eve hit, including mixes by Mike Koglin and Blu. Although it failed to reach the UK Singles Chart, it was a No. 8 UK club hit and a favourite of DJ, Paul van Dyk.

A solo album was recorded and planned for release for late 1999, entitled Live for Today but was cancelled; it was eventually released on digital platforms in 2016. In the 2000s, Newton turned her attention to jazz and Latin music, and in 2003 released a solo album of jazz and Brazilian music entitled The Song Is You.

In 2006, a set of remixes of "U Sure Do" were released.

== Discography ==
Strike discography
- Studio albums: 1
- Extended plays: 1
- Singles: 8

=== Studio albums ===
Title	Album details	Peak chart positions
Title	Album details	UK
I Saw the Future	Released: 1997; Label: Chrysalis/Fresh	155

=== EPs ===
Title	EP details	Tracks
The Biteback EP	Released: 1996; Label: Fresh Sounds Records	"The Genie (Come with Me)"; "Ambient Drop"; "Forget It?"; "Formula Uno"

=== Singles ===
Year	Title	Peak chart positions						Certifications	Album
Year	Title	UK	AUS	GER	IRE	NED	SWI	Certifications	Album
1994	"Formula One"	89	—	—	—	—	—		Non-album single
1994	"U Sure Do"	4	9	—	20	15	—	UK: Gold	I Saw the Future
1995	"The Morning After (Free at Last)"	38	115	—	—	—	—		I Saw the Future
1996	"Inspiration"	27	46	—	—	—	—		I Saw the Future
1996	"My Love Is for Real"	35	157	—	—	—	—		I Saw the Future
1997	"I Have Peace"	17	—	55	—	—	34		I Saw the Future
"—" denotes items that did not chart or were not released in that territory.

== Sources ==
- Jazz CDs. Biography of Victoria Newton. Retrieved 8 May 2007.
