= My Love Is for Real =

1995 single by Paula Abdul

Single by Paula Abdul

from the album Head over Heels
- B-side: "Didn't I Say I Love You"
- Released: May 30, 1995
- Genre: Pop; dance-pop; world
- Length: 5:20
- Label: Virgin; Captive
- Songwriters: Paula Abdul; Rhett Lawrence
- Producer: Rhett Lawrence

Paula Abdul singles chronology
| "Will You Marry Me?" (1992) | "My Love Is for Real" (1995) | "Crazy Cool" (1995) |

Music video
- "My Love Is for Real" on YouTube

"My Love Is for Real" is a song by American singer and songwriter Paula Abdul with backing vocals from Israeli singer Ofra Haza. It was released on May 30, 1995, by Virgin and Captive Records as the first single from Abdul's third studio album, Head over Heels (1995). Intended as Abdul's comeback single, "My Love Is for Real" reached number one in Hungary and entered the top 20 in Australia, Canada, Israel, and New Zealand, but it stalled outside the top 20 in the United States, peaking at number 28 on the Billboard Hot 100, and failed to make a major impact in Europe. The song's music video was directed by Michael Haussman.

== Composition ==
Written by Abdul and Rhett Lawrence, the song fuses trip hop and traditional Indian instruments as well as Middle Eastern music with backing vocals by Israeli singer Ofra Haza, producing a darker sound not present in Abdul's earlier hits and also containing elements of industrial music. The single's B-side is the mid-tempo song "Didn't I Say I Love You", written by Elliot Wolf and Stacey Piersa.

== Critical reception ==
Larry Flick from Billboard magazine viewed the song as "an overlooked pop-treasure", describing it as "cute" and "fun". Chuck Campbell from Knoxville News Sentinel described it as "Middle Eastern-flavored" and "slow chugging". In his weekly UK chart commentary, James Masterton wrote, "Her new single goes for the dance angle, reminiscent of her first hit 'Straight Up' but this time round unlikely to become too big a hit for her." Ian Watson from Melody Maker felt that "mucho respect" goes to Abdul "for first having the good sense to employ the wailing woman talents of Ofra Haza and then penning a pop song that flirts dangerously with the intense feelings found in the Arabic music world." A reviewer from Music Week gave "My Love Is for Real" a score of four out of five, adding, "Smooth, soulful vocals with a funky rhythm and oriental touches show Abdul back on form." John Perry from NME named it the "strongest of all" on the album, "mixing Ofra Haza's ethereal vocals over Paula's Madonna-esque whispering, almost turning a standard sexy ballad into Massive Attack's 'Safe from Harm'. Almost." Mark Sutherland from Smash Hits gave it three out of five, writing, "Nowadays though, she's reduced to copying Madonna with this stab at 'Justify My Love'/'Confide in Me' eastern-tinged sexiness. A hit the size of a house, but that's hardly the point."

== Chart performance ==
"My Love Is for Real" was intended to be a comeback single for Abdul, who had not released an album since 1991's triple-platinum Spellbound. The single was not as successful as Abdul's previous releases and peaked at number 28 on the US Billboard Hot 100. To date, it is Abdul's most recent top-40 hit in the US. The song fared better on the Billboard Dance Club Play chart, where it reached the number-one position.

Internationally "My Love Is for Real" peaked at number five in Israel, reached number seven in Australia, and became a top-20 hit in New Zealand and Canada. In the United Kingdom, the song peaked at number 28 on the UK Singles Chart and number three on the UK R&B Singles Chart. The song did not impact Ireland or mainland Europe at all, save for Hungary, where it topped the country's chart, and Germany, where it reached number 87.

== Music video ==
The accompanying music video for "My Love Is for Real", directed by Michael Haussman, features Middle Eastern-inspired imagery with Abdul appearing as the head mistress of a harem. The video received two MTV Video Music Award nominations: Best Dance Video and Best Choreography in a Video.

== Track listings ==
- US and cassette CD single
1. "My Love Is for Real" (radio edit) – 4:23
2. "Didn't I Say I Love You" – 3:29
3. "My Love Is for Real" (LP version) – 5:21
4. "My Love Is for Real" (R&B remix) – 4:04
- US 7-inch single

A. "My Love Is for Real" (radio edit) – 4:23
B. "Didn't I Say I Love You" – 3:29

- US 12-inch single

A1. "My Love Is for Real" (E-Smoove's Fever mix) – 8:25
A2. "My Love Is for Real" (Strike's Pink Wig dub) – 6:48
B1. "My Love Is for Real" (downtempo club dub) – 8:02
B2. "Didn't I Say I Love You" – 3:05

- UK CD single
1. "My Love Is for Real" (E-Smoove's Fever 7-inch edit) – 3:47
2. "My Love Is for Real" (LP version) – 5:21
3. "My Love Is for Real" (Strike Straight Up There mix) – 7:05
4. "Didn't I Say I Love You" – 3:29
- UK cassette single; European CD single; Japanese mini-CD single
1. "My Love Is for Real" (LP version) – 5:21
2. "Didn't I Say I Love You" – 3:29
- Australian CD single
1. "My Love Is for Real" (LP version) – 5:21
2. "My Love Is for Real" (E-Smoove's Fever 7-inch edit) – 3:47
3. "My Love Is for Real" (Strike Straight Up There mix) – 7:05
4. "Didn't I Say I Love You" – 3:29

== Charts ==
=== Weekly charts ===
| Chart (1995) | Peak position |
|---|---|
| Australia (ARIA) | 7 |
| Canada Retail Singles (The Record) | 23 |
| Canada Contemporary Hit Radio (The Record) | 8 |
| Canada Top Singles (RPM) | 20 |
| Canada Adult Contemporary (RPM) | 6 |
| Canada Dance/Urban (RPM) | 7 |
| Europe (Eurochart Hot 100) | 44 |
| Europe (European Dance Radio) | 8 |
| Europe (European Hit Radio) | 11 |
| Germany (GfK) | 87 |
| Hungary (Mahasz) | 1 |
| Israel (Israeli Singles Chart) | 5 |
| Netherlands (Dutch Top 40 Tipparade) | 13 |
| Netherlands (Single Top 100 Tipparade) | 5 |
| New Zealand (Recorded Music NZ) | 20 |
| Scottish Singles Sales (Official Charts) | 41 |
| UK Singles (Official Charts) | 28 |
| UK Dance (Official Charts) | 12 |
| UK Hip Hop/R&B (Official Charts) | 3 |
| US Billboard Hot 100 | 28 |
| US Adult Contemporary (Billboard) | 40 |
| US Dance Club Songs (Billboard) | 1 |
| US Dance Singles Sales (Billboard) | 13 |
| US Hot R&B/Hip-Hop Songs (Billboard) | 96 |
| US Pop Airplay (Billboard) | 16 |
| US Rhythmic Airplay (Billboard) | 30 |
| US Cash Box Top 100 | 13 |
| US CHR/Pop (Radio & Records) | 16 |
| US CHR/Rhythmic (Radio & Records) | 26 |

=== Year-end charts ===
| Chart (1995) | Position |
|---|---|
| Canada Adult Contemporary (RPM) | 52 |
| US Dance Club Play (Billboard) | 42 |
| US CHR/Pop (Radio & Records) | 74 |

== Release history ==
| Region | Date | Format(s) | Label(s) | Ref. |
|---|---|---|---|---|
| United States | May 9, 1995 | Rhythmic contemporary; contemporary hit radio | Virgin; Captive | |
| United States | May 30, 1995 | 7-inch vinyl; CD; cassette | Virgin; Captive | |
| United Kingdom | June 5, 1995 | 12-inch vinyl; CD; cassette | Virgin | |
| Japan | July 5, 1995 | Mini-CD | Virgin | |

== Strike version ==
"My Love Is for Real"

Single by Strike

from the album I Saw the Future
- Released: November 4, 1996
- Genre: Dance-pop; house
- Length: 3:48
- Label: Fresh
- Songwriters: Paula Abdul; Rhett Lawrence
- Producers: Andy Gardner; Matt Cantor

Strike singles chronology
| "U Sure Do" (1994) | "My Love Is for Real" (1996) | "I Have Peace" (1997) |

Music video
- "My Love is for Real" on YouTube

British electronic dance music group Strike released their version of "My Love Is for Real" in November 1996 through Fresh Records. It was the fourth single from their only studio album, I Saw the Future (1997), and was produced by Andy Gardner and Matt Cantor of Strike, with vocals by Victoria Newton. The single peaked at number 35 in the United Kingdom and number 45 in Scotland. Outside Europe it reached number 157 in Australia. British magazine Music Week gave Strike's version of "My Love Is for Real" a score of four out of five, writing, "The magic is still there from the band who have got making commercial pop dance down to a fine art. Another smash."

=== Track listings ===
- UK 12-inch single (1996)
1. "My Love Is 4 Real" (Strike's Big Outback 12-inch mix)
2. "My Love Is 4 Real" (Strike's Small Upfront dub)
3. "My Love Is 4 Real" (Ramp vocal mix)
4. "My Love Is 4 Real" (Ramp dub)
- UK CD single (1996)
1. "My Love Is for Real" (radio edit) – 3:48
2. "My Love Is for Real" (Strike's Big Outback 12-inch mix) – 6:11
3. "My Love Is for Real" (Strike's Small Upfront dub) – 6:35
4. "My Love Is for Real" (Ramp vocal mix) – 6:37
5. "My Love Is for Real" (Ramp dub) – 7:33

=== Charts ===
==== Weekly charts ====
| Chart (1996–1997) | Peak position |
|---|---|
| Australia (ARIA) | 157 |
| Europe (Eurochart Hot 100) | 84 |
| France Airplay (SNEP) | 100 |
| Scotland (OCC) | 45 |
| UK Singles (OCC) | 35 |
| UK Dance (OCC) | 3 |
| UK Pop Tip Club Chart (Music Week) | 3 |

==== Year-end charts ====
| Chart (1996) | Position |
|---|---|
| UK Pop Tip Club Chart (Music Week) | 6 |

== See also ==
- List of number-one dance hits (United States)
