= Head over Heels (Paula Abdul album) =

Studio album by Paula Abdul
- Released: June 13, 1995
- Recorded: 1994–1995
- Studios: Conway (Hollywood); Record One (Los Angeles); Larrabee (Los Angeles); Capitol (Hollywood); Oakshire (Sherman Oaks); River Sound (New York City); A-Pawling (New York City); Jasmine Sound (San Clemente); Record Plant (Los Angeles); Knightlight (Dallas); Dallas Sound Lab (Dallas); Ocean Way (Los Angeles); Westlake (Los Angeles); DARP (Atlanta); Bosstown Studios (Atlanta); The Enterprise (Burbank); Palette (Los Angeles); Sony (New York City); A&M (Hollywood); Rumbo (Canoga Park); Neptune Factor (Sherman Oaks)
- Genre: Pop
- Length: 59:40
- Labels: Virgin; Captive
- Producers: Peter Lord; V. Jeffrey Smith; Rhett Lawrence; Elliot Wolff; Howie Hersh; Iky Levi; Robb Boldt; Cha'n André; Michael Stuart Ani or "Da'Count"; Eric Monsanty; Arnold Hennings; Dallas Austin; Oliver Leiber; Daryl Simmons; Tim Miner

Paula Abdul chronology
Spellbound (1991)	Head over Heels (1995)	Greatest Hits (2000)

Singles from Head over Heels
- 1. "My Love Is for Real" Released: May 30, 1995; 2. "Crazy Cool" Released: August 22, 1995; 3. "Ain't Never Gonna Give You Up" Released: December 28, 1995

Professional ratings
Review scores
Source	Rating
AllMusic	2/5 stars
The Encyclopedia of Popular Music	2/5 stars
Entertainment Weekly	C+
Knoxville News Sentinel	3/5 stars
Los Angeles Times	1/4 stars
NME	7/10
Rolling Stone	2/5 stars

Head over Heels is the third studio album released by American singer Paula Abdul on June 13, 1995, under Virgin Records and Captive Records. The album features three singles "My Love Is for Real", "Crazy Cool" and "Ain't Never Gonna Give You Up".

== Background ==
In 1994, Abdul took a break from her music career to focus on her personal life. Her marriage to Emilio Estevez ended with them filing for divorce, and she sought treatment for bulimia. "I was so sad, I just needed to be filled up. It was like I was trying to fill this big empty hole", she said. This experience gave her strength to work on a third album, Head over Heels, her most honest and personal project. "I took all the stuff I was afraid to face, and put it in my music", the singer said. Abdul also stated that, "It's a completely different space and time for me. I've experienced some spiritual growth that has allowed me to really get back to what I enjoy doing best. And that's being totally connected to the creative source as a recording artist and dancer".

For Head over Heels, Abdul decided to work with an array of different producers. According to her: "I've now experienced both sides. On my first album, I worked with seven producers; on 'Spellbound' I worked with only a few. Going into my third album, I wanted to again experiment with many different people and flavors". At the same time, "I went into this album thinking I didn't want to be in any compromising situations, as I was at times, on my last two albums. Going into the studio and creating an album is a very intimate experience. I'm now more involved in the production end of my songs. I'm unafraid to state what my feelings and opinions are. All my producers were so open to my input and they were very honest. They said, 'Thank God you thought of that'. It was a good feeling."

== Composition ==
Head over Heels is primarily a pop album with elements of hip-hop, Motown soul, rap, latin pop, psychedelic soul, soul-pop, Cuban music and Middle Eastern music.

== Commercial performance ==
Head over Heels was less successful than Abdul's previous albums, peaking on the US Billboard 200 chart at number 18. The album is currently certified gold.

Three singles were released from Head over Heels. The first single, "My Love Is for Real", was the only Top 40 single from the album, peaking at number 28 on the Billboard Hot 100. The following single, "Crazy Cool" peaked at number 58. However, both of them were more successful on the US Dance Club Songs chart, with the former topping it (her only song to do so). The last single from the album, "Ain't Never Gonna Give You Up", failed to chart and peaked number 12 on the Bubbling Under Hot 100.

== Track listing ==
Head over Heels track listing
No.	Title	Writer(s)	Producer(s)	Length
1.	"Crazy Cool"	Peter Lord; Sandra St. Victor; V. Jeffrey Smith	Lord; Smith	4:42
2.	"My Love Is for Real"	Abdul; Rhett Lawrence	Lawrence	5:20
3.	"Ain't Never Gonna Give You Up"	Bryan Abrams; Mark Calderon; Howie Tee; Kevin Thornton; Curtis "Fitz" Williams; Elliot Wolff	Wolff	3:53
4.	"Love Don't Come Easy"	Abdul; Robb Boldt; Da'Count; Howard Hersh; Iky Levi; Eric Monsanty	Hersh; Levy; Boldt; Cha'n André; Da' Count; Monsanty	4:07
5.	"If I Were Your Girl"	Crystal Bernard; Lawrence	Lawrence	3:55
6.	"Sexy Thoughts"	Boldt; Hersh; Levy	Hersh; Levy; Boldt	4:09
7.	"The Choice Is Yours"	Arnold Hennings; Debra Killings	Hennings; Dallas Austin	4:48
8.	"Ho-Down"	Abdul; Boldt; Calloway; Da'Count; Gaskill; Greer; Hersh; Mills; Wolff	Wolff; Hersh; Levy; Boldt	4:23
9.	"Under the Influence"	Worthy Davis; Oliver Leiber	Leiber	4:29
10.	"I Never Knew It"	Daryl Simmons	Simmons	4:26
11.	"Get Your Groove On"	Hersh; Levy; Boldt	Hersh; Levy; Boldt	4:02
12.	"Missing You"	Bernadette Cooper	Lawrence	3:52
13.	"It's All About Feeling Good"	Abdul; Hersh; Levy; Boldt	Hersh; Levy; Boldt	3:46
14.	"Cry for Me"	Tim Miner	Miner	3:38
Total length:				59:40

Japanese edition bonus tracks
No.	Title	Writer(s)	Producer(s)	Length
15.	"Crazy Love"	Leiber	Leiber	4:31
16.	"Highschool Crush"	Jon Lind; John Andrew Schreiner; Abdul	Lind	4:36
Total length:				73:35

Sample credits

- "Ho-Down" samples "Ain't Got a Gal in Town" by Cab Calloway and His Orchestra

== Personnel ==
Adapted from AllMusic.

- Paula Abdul – all vocals
- Bryan Abrams, Cha'n Andre, Robb Boldt, Robbie J. Brown, Mark Calderon, Cindy & Janie Cruse, Valerie & Worthy Davis, Bruce DeShazer, Ofra Haza, Marva King, Tanya Smith, Sandra St. Victor, Kevin Thornton, Sam Watters, Monalisa Young – backing vocals
- Dallas Austin – various instruments
- Charlie Barnett – percussion
- Rocky Bryant – keyboards, synthesizers, drums, percussion
- Keith Carlock – drums, percussion
- Vince Denham – tenor saxophone
- Walt Fowler, Ralph Rickert, Dan Savant – trumpet
- Ronnie Garrett, Tracy Wormworth – bass guitar
- Grant Geissman – banjo
- Lili Haydn – violin
- Howard Hersh, Peter Lord Moreland, John Andrew Shreiner, V. Jeffrey Smith – keyboards
- Eric Jorgenson – trombone
- Shaun LaBelle – electric bass guitar, synthesizers
- John Leftwich – horns
- Oliver Leiber – keyboards, synthesizers, guitars, electric sitar, drums, percussion
- Iki Levy – percussion
- Keith Lewis – percussion and various programming
- Karl Messerschmidt – tuba
- Tim Miner – electric bass, keyboards, backing vocals
- Michael Patterson – synthesizers
- Paul Peterson – electric piano
- Harihar Rao – sitar, tamboura
- John Shanks, Andy Timmons, Bill Wiseman – guitars
- Rick Sheppard – synthesizers, samples
- Daryl Simmons – keyboards, programming, drums, percussion, backing vocals
- Ralph Stacey – electric and bass guitars
- Gerri Sutyak – cello
- Albert Wing – tenor and alto saxophone, clarinet

== Charts ==
Chart performance for Head over Heels
Chart (1995)	Peak position
Australian Albums (ARIA)	27
Canada Top Albums/CDs (RPM)	21
Dutch Albums (Album Top 100)	74
Japanese Albums (Oricon)	32
UK Albums (Official Charts)	61
US Billboard 200	18
US Top 100 Pop Albums (Cashbox)	42

== Certifications ==
Certifications for Head over Heels
Region	Certification	Certified units/sales
United States (RIAA)	Gold	500,000^{^}
^{^} Shipments figures based on certification alone.
