= Blowing Kisses in the Wind =

1991 single by Paula Abdul

Single by Paula Abdul

from the album Spellbound
- B-side: "Spellbound"
- Released: October 17, 1991
- Recorded: 1990
- Studio: Greene Street Recording (New York City, NY); Mad Hatter Studios (Los Angeles); Studio Masters (Los Angeles); Z Recording Studio (Brooklyn, NY)
- Genre: Pop
- Length: 4:42 (album version); 4:15 (edit)
- Label: Virgin
- Songwriter: Peter Lord
- Producers: Peter Lord; V. Jeffrey Smith

Paula Abdul singles chronology
"The Promise of a New Day" (1991)	"Blowing Kisses in the Wind" (1991)	"Vibeology" (1991)

Music video
- "Blowing Kisses in the Wind" on YouTube

"Blowing Kisses in the Wind" is a song by American singer and dancer Paula Abdul, taken from her second studio album, Spellbound (1991). Written by Peter Lord and produced by Lord and V. Jeffrey Smith, it was released as the album's third official single on October 17, 1991, exclusively to North America, Australia, and Japan, as the album's next single "Vibeology" would be released in Europe instead of this song. "Blowing Kisses in the Wind" utilizes the harpsichord. Sweet Pea Atkinson provided background vocals to the track.

The track became a commercial success, reaching numbers six and seven on the US Billboard Hot 100 and Canadian RPM Top Singles chart; in the former country, it is her most recent top-ten single to date. In 1998, it was ranked as the 26th most successful single by Virgin Records in the United States.

== Background ==
The song is a ballad in the same vein as the album's lead single "Rush Rush" and lyrically discusses unrequited love. Originally, Virgin Records had intended to release "Vibeology" as the third single from Spellbound following Abdul's performance of the song at the 1991 MTV Video Music Awards; however, it was cancelled in favor of "Blowing Kisses in the Wind" which was receiving airplay at the time, creating demand for the song.

== Critical reception ==
Billboard magazine gave the song a positive review saying, "Rack up another multiformat hit from Abdul's double-platinum epic, Spellbound, as she gets soft and romantic for an engaging pop ballad. Plush strings provide a warm and properly dramatic setting for her chirpy and charming voice." Vladimir Bogdanov of AllMusic described it as a "sweeping, adult love song" that helped gave her strong crossover appeal to the adult contemporary market without alienating her original fan base.

== Chart performance ==
"Blowing Kisses in the Wind" debuted at number 47 on the US Billboard Hot 100 chart, earning the "Hot Shot Debut" title for the week ending October 19, 1991. The following week, the song climbed to number 33, with that week gaining the title of "Greatest Airplay Gainer." The single eventually peaked at number six, remaining at that spot for three consecutive weeks, before falling down the chart. Overall, "Blowing Kisses in the Wind" spent seven weeks in the top 10, longer than her previous single "The Promise of a New Day" which peaked at number one. It was ranked at number 73 for the Billboard Year-End Hot 100 singles of 1992. It is one of her two top-ten hits to not top the chart, the other being "(It's Just) The Way That You Love Me", and is her eighth and final top ten single to date as of 2026. "Blowing Kisses in the Wind" would also hit the top ten of the Canada RPM Top Singles, hitting number seven on the chart and hit the top twenty of the RPM Adult Contemporary chart. The track would also become a top-forty hit in Poland despite it never being officially released in Europe.

== Music video ==
Abdul in the music video for "Blowing Kisses in the Wind."

The video was filmed immediately following her 1991 MTV Video Music Awards performance of "Vibeology". It was directed by BIG TV!, a team made up of Andy Delaney and Monty Whitebloom and whom Abdul had worked with multiple times. Abdul's friend and fellow Laker Girl Cindy Picker would also choreograph the music video. The video was released on November 9, 1991, on MTV, of which it was released as an "Exclusive." It was then released to Video Hits One (VH1) on November 23, 1991.

=== Synopsis ===
The music video features Abdul dancing on a theater stage, ballet-style with aerial dynamics that were also incorporated in her world tour. The video is mostly shot in the dark. She is featured singing on a microphone on the stage, which cuts to clips with Abdul performing ballet with a male dancer.

== Track listings and formats ==
US and Canadian cassette single, Japanese CD single

1. "Blowing Kisses in the Wind" – 4:42
2. "Spellbound" – 4:48

Australian CD single

1. "Blowing Kisses in the Wind" (Edit) – 4:15
2. "Blowing Kisses in the Wind" (LP) – 4:42
3. "Spellbound" – 4:48

== Personnel ==
Taken from the Spellbound booklet.

- Paula Abdul – lead vocals
- V. Jeffrey Smith and Peter Lord – programming and keyboards
- Clifford "Moonie" Pusey II – guitar
- Myra Singleton – bass
- Clare Fischer – string orchestra conductor and arranger
- Peter Lord – background vocals

== Charts ==
=== Weekly charts ===
Chart (1991)	Peak position
Canada Retail Singles (The Record)	6
Canada Top Singles (RPM)	7
Canada Adult Contemporary (RPM)	14
Canada Contemporary Hit Radio (The Record)	5
US Billboard Hot 100	6
US Adult Contemporary (Billboard)	5
US Top 40 Radio Monitor (Billboard)	5
US Contemporary Hit Radio (Radio & Records)	2
US Adult Contemporary (Radio & Records)	5
US Top 40 (Gavin Report)	2
US Crossover (Gavin Report)	2
US Adult Contemporary (Gavin Report)	4
US Cash Box Top 100	3

=== Year-end charts ===
Chart (1991)	Position
Canada Top Singles (RPM)	98
US Contemporary Hit Radio (Radio & Records)	81
US Adult Contemporary (Radio & Records)	86
US Top 40 (Gavin Report)	82
US Adult Contemporary (Gavin Report)	94
Chart (1992)	Position
US Billboard Hot 100	73
US Adult Contemporary (Billboard)	46
US Adult Contemporary (Radio & Records)	85
US Cash Box Top 100	28
