= Crazy Cool =

Single by Paula Abdul

from the album Head over Heels
- B-side: "The Choice Is Yours"
- Released: August 8, 1995
- Recorded: 1995
- Studio: Conway Recording Studios (Los Angeles, CA)
- Genre: Funk; pop
- Length: 4:42
- Label: Virgin; Captive
- Songwriters: Peter Lord; V. Jeffrey Smith; Sandra St. Victor
- Producers: Peter Lord; V. Jeffrey Smith

Paula Abdul singles chronology
"My Love Is for Real" (1995)	"Crazy Cool" (1995)	"Ain't Never Gonna Give You Up" (1996)

"Crazy Cool" is a song recorded by American recording artist Paula Abdul for her third studio album, Head over Heels (1995). It was written by Peter Lord, V. Jeffrey Smith, and Sandra St. Victor, produced by the former two, and released as the album's second single on August 8, 1995, by Virgin Records. The song was not released in the United Kingdom.

== Composition ==
"Crazy Cool" is performed in the key of C♯/D♭, with a moderate tempo of 88 beats per minute.

== Critical reception ==
Steve Baltin from Cash Box wrote, "The second single from Abdul’s Head Over Heels CD is successful when it follows the same slightly dark ambient tones of “My Love Is For Real”, the record’s first single. However, it loses its way during the overly bubbly chorus. Abdul obviously wanted to try something new on this record. Hopefully she learned the valuable lesson for next time of sticking to one’s own guns." Larry Flick of Billboard magazine responded positively to the track, saying Abdul has developed into "quite the seductress, as evident in her pouty delivery of this song's smoldering words." Reading Eagle, however, offered a more mixed opinion, reviewing that the song lacked the urgent rhythms of previous singles. Gavin Report wrote favorably of the track but regarded it as a downgrade from "My Love Is For Real".

== Chart performance ==
The single became Abdul's first since 1988 not to enter the top 40, reaching no higher than number 58 on the Billboard Hot 100 and was a hit on the dance charts. In Canada, the single performed slightly better, where it peaked at number 49 and remained on the chart for 15 weeks.

== Music video ==
The accompanying music video for "Crazy Cool" was directed by Matthew Rolston and shot at A&M Studios in Hollywood at the end of July 1995. Originally MTV refused to play the video. In the clip, Abdul holds a black cane on and against herself; she also pours a bottle of beer over her breasts while riding a mechanical bull. Rolston and Abdul claimed that it was simply part of the choreography, but MTV still said they would not play the clip unless it was edited down to a cleaner version. In the end, Rolston and Abdul admitted defeat and made the requested edits.

The "Single Remix Version" was the remix used in the video.

== Track listings and formats ==
US maxi-CD single

1. "Crazy Cool" (Single Remix Version) – 3:57
2. "Crazy Cool" (Jeep Mix) – 3:57
3. "The Choice Is Yours" (Edit) – 3:56
4. "Crazy Cool" (Urban Mix) – 4:00
5. "Crazy Cool" (Bad Boy Bill House Mix) – 3:47
6. "Crazy Cool" (Deep Dish's Crazy Cool Remix) – 10:08

US CD and cassette single (European CD single swaps tracks two and four)

1. "Crazy Cool" (Single Remix Version) – 3:57
2. "Crazy Cool" (Jeep Mix) – 3:57
3. "The Choice Is Yours" (Edit) – 3:56
4. "Crazy Cool" (Bad Boy Bill House Mix) – 3:47

US 12-inch single

1. "Crazy Cool" (Bad Boy Bill House Mix) – 6:03
2. "Crazy Cool" (Strike's Dub) – 6:10
3. "The Choice Is Yours" (Edit) – 3:57
4. "Crazy Cool" (Deep Dish's Crazy Cool Remix) – 11:28

Official Versions

- Single Remix Version – 3:56
- Urban Mix – 4:05
- Jeep Mix – 3:56
- Strike's Dub – 6:04
- Strike Vocal Mix – 6:44
- Deep Dish's Crazy Cool Remix – 11:28
- Bad Boy Bill House Mix – 3:47
- Bad Boy Bill Dub – 4:03
- Sharam Crazy Journey Mix – 12:39
- LP Version – 4:42
- Deep Dish's Crazy Cool Edit – 10:42

== Personnel ==
Taken from the Head over Heels album booklet.

- Paula Abdul – lead vocals
- Paula Abdul, Sandra St. Victor – background vocals
- V. Jeffrey Smith, Peter Lord – keyboards
- Tracy Wormworth – bass
- Rocky Bryant – drums
- John Andrew Schreiner – synths and vintage keys
- Oliver Leiber – talk box and wah wah guitars

== Charts ==
Chart (1995)	Peak position
Australia (ARIA)	76
Canada Top Singles (RPM)	49
Canada Adult Contemporary (RPM)	34
Canada Contemporary Hit Radio (The Record)	13
European Atlantic Crossovers (Music & Media)	16
European Hit Radio (Music & Media)	38
Germany (GfK)	89
Poland Airplay (Music & Media)	3
US Billboard Hot 100	58
US Dance Club Songs (Billboard)	13
US Pop Airplay (Billboard)	26
US Rhythmic Airplay (Billboard)	37
US Cash Box Top 100 Pop Singles	46
US Adult Contemporary (Gavin Report)	38
US Top 40 (Gavin Report)	17
US CHR/Pop (Radio & Records)	22
US CHR/Rhythmic (Radio & Records)	50

== Release history ==
Release dates and formats for "Crazy Cool"
Region	Date	Format(s)	Label(s)	Ref.
United States	August 8, 1995	Contemporary hit radio; rhythmic contemporary radio	Virgin; Captive	
