= Will You Marry Me? =

1992 single by Paula Abdul

Single by Paula Abdul

from the album Spellbound
- B-side: "Good Night, My Love (Pleasant Dreams)"
- Released: March 19, 1992
- Studio: Studio Masters (Los Angeles)
- Length: 4:24
- Label: Virgin
- Songwriters: Paula Abdul; Sandra St. Victor; Peter Lord; V. Jeffrey Smith
- Producers: Peter Lord; V. Jeffrey Smith

Paula Abdul singles chronology
"Vibeology" (1992)	"Will You Marry Me?" (1992)	"My Love Is for Real" (1995)

Music video
- "Will You Marry Me?" on YouTube

"Will You Marry Me?" is a song by American artist Paula Abdul, released as the fifth and final widely released single (the album's final single "Alright Tonight" was exclusively released in Canada) from her second studio album, Spellbound (1991). The song was written by Abdul, Peter Lord, Sandra St. Victor and V. Jeffrey Smith and produced by Lord and Smith. Stevie Wonder notably appears as a special guest playing the harmonica.

The track received moderate success, hitting the top ten in Canada.

== Content ==
"Will You Marry Me?" is performed in the key of G major, with Abdul's vocals ranging from B3–E5. The song is about the narrator pleading for her partner to marry her. It was coincidentally released just as Abdul had gotten engaged and married to actor Emilio Estevez. The single's B-side was a track from the Spellbound sessions called "Good Night, My Love (Pleasant Dreams)" which was only included in the international edition of the album. It was recorded for a compilation as well, called For Our Children, whose proceeds benefited the Pediatric AIDS Foundation.

== Critical reception ==
Larry Flick of Billboard magazine gave the track a positive review, saying "Overall warm reception to ballads from the multi-platinum Spellbound set bodes well for this retro-spiced tune. Harmonica cameo by Stevie Wonder sits well next to Abdul's charming vocal and track's glistening production values. Quite nice." Bryan Buss of AllMusic described the song as "skating that thin line between sweet and precious." Diane Rufer and Ron Fell of Gavin Report also wrote a positive review of the single saying, "We think this is a mute question now, but the single is a worthy play this time of the year in any case."

== Chart performance ==
Like the previous single "Vibeology" the single reached the top 20 on the Billboard Hot 100, stalling at number 19 and becoming a modest hit for Abdul. The song performed strongest in Canada where it reached number 6 on the RPM Top Singles chart. It gave Abdul her ninth top 10 single there. "Will You Marry Me?" however performed poorly outside North America, failing to enter the top-fifty in Europe or Australia.

== Music video ==
The video for "Will You Marry Me" was directed by Big TV!, a duo made up of Andy Delaney and Monty Whitebloom and whom Abdul have worked with multiple times before. It was added to MTV's playlist for the week of May 2, 1992. It was then released to VH1 on May 9, 1992.

=== Synopsis ===
The music video for the song featured a digital composite of five versions of Abdul wearing similarly coloured white outfits. Each "version" of Abdul performs a different style of dance to the song (ballet, jazz, etc...) and ultimately settle into a choreographed routine in which they dance with one another, concluding with one Abdul dancing with and being carried off by a translucent partner.

== Track listings ==
US cassette single

1. "Will You Marry Me?" (LP Version) – 4:24
2. "Goodnight, My Love" (Special Non-Album Track) – 3:12

UK CD single

1. "Will You Marry Me?" (Edit) – 3:43
2. "The Promise of a New Day" (East Coast Remix) – 4:54
3. "Good Night, My Love (Pleasant Dreams)" – 3:06
4. "Will You Marry Me?" (Album Version) – 4:25

Australian CD single

1. "Will You Marry Me?" (Edit) – 3:43
2. "Will You Marry Me?" (LP Version) – 4:25

== Personnel ==
Taken from the Spellbound booklet.

- Paula Abdul – lead vocals
- V. Jeffrey Smith and Peter Lord – programming and keyboards
- V. Jeffrey Smith – guitar
- Stevie Wonder – harmonica
- Sandra St. Victor – background vocals

== Charts ==
=== Weekly charts ===
Weekly chart performance for "Will You Marry Me?"
Chart (1992)	Peak position
Australia (ARIA)	54
Canada Contemporary Hit Radio (The Record)	4
Canada Top Singles (RPM)	6
Germany (GfK)	74
UK Singles (Official Charts)	73
US Billboard Hot 100	19
US Adult Contemporary (Billboard)	17
US Top 40 Radio Monitor (Billboard)	13
US Contemporary Hit Radio (Radio & Records)	5
US Adult Contemporary (Radio & Records)	16
US Top 40 (Gavin Report)	8
US Crossover (Gavin Report)	6
US Adult Contemporary (Gavin Report)	8
US Top 100 Pop Singles (Cashbox)	12

=== Year-end charts ===
1992 year-end chart performance for "Will You Marry Me?"
Chart (1992)	Peak position
Canada Top Singles (RPM)	78
US Contemporary Hit Radio (Radio & Records)	75
US Top 40 (Gavin Report)	79
US Adult Contemporary (Gavin Report)	83

== Release history ==
Release dates and format(s) for "Will You Marry Me?"
Region	Date	Format(s)	Label(s)	Ref.
United States	March 19, 1992	7-inch vinyl; cassette	Virgin	
United Kingdom	July 27, 1992	7-inch vinyl; 12-inch vinyl; CD; cassette	Virgin	
