= Ain't Never Gonna Give You Up =

Single by Paula Abdul

from the album Head over Heels
- Released: December 28, 1995
- Recorded: 1994
- Studio: Rumbo Recorders (Los Angeles, CA)
- Genre: Pop; funk
- Length: 3:30
- Label: Virgin
- Songwriters: Bryan Abrams; Elliot Wolff; Howie Tee; Kevin Thornton; Mark Calderon; Curtis "Fitz" Williams
- Producer: Elliot Wolff

Paula Abdul singles chronology
| "Crazy Cool" (1995) | "Ain't Never Gonna Give You Up" (1995) | "Dance Like There's No Tomorrow" (2008) |

"Ain't Never Gonna Give You Up" is a song by American singer and dancer Paula Abdul, released as the third and final single from her third studio album Head over Heels (1995). The track features background vocals from the vocal group Color Me Badd. It was written by Bryan Abrams, Elliot Wolff, Howie Tee, Kevin Thornton, Mark Calderon, and Curtis "Fitz" Williams, with Wolff producing the track. It was released on December 28, 1995 by Virgin Records.

Following the moderate performance of "My Love Is For Real" and "Crazy Cool", which became Abdul's first single since 1988 to miss the top 40 in the U.S., "Ain't Never Gonna Give You Up" was even less of a chart success. It became Abdul's first official single to miss the US Billboard Hot 100 altogether and had little airplay on both radio and MTV. The track would be Abdul's last overall music release until her collaboration with American Idol judge Randy Jackson, "Dance Like There's No Tomorrow", in 2008, over 12 years later.

== Critical reception ==
John Perry from NME noted "the spankin' summery smooch" of "Ain't Never Gonna Give You Up". Larry Flick of Billboard gave it a positive review saying, "Latest offering [...] is a springy pop/funk ditty that features a harmonious vocal appearance by Color Me Badd. The song is riddled with festive Staxx music references and amusing sing-along refrains."

== Track listing ==
US, Australian, European single

1. "Ain't Never Gonna Give You Up" (Single Edit) – 3:28
2. "Ain't Never Gonna Give You Up" (Livingsting Remix) – 3:49
3. "Ain't Never Gonna Give You Up" (Livingsting Club Mix) – 3:38
4. "Love Don't Come Easy" – 4:03

== Charts ==
Weekly chart performance for "Ain't Never Gonna Give You Up"
| Chart (1996) | Peak position |
|---|---|
| US Bubbling Under Hot 100 Singles (Billboard) | 12 |
| US Top 40 (Gavin Report) | 36 |
