= Spellbound (Paula Abdul album) =

Studio album by Paula Abdul
- Released: May 14, 1991
- Recorded: September 1990 – March 1991
- Studios: Greene Street Recording (New York City, New York); Z Recording (Brooklyn, New York); Hollywood Sound Recording; Institute of Social Disruption; Studio Masters; Sunset Sound (each Los Angeles, California); Mad Hatter (Silver Lake, California); Ocean Way Recording (Hollywood, California); Paisley Park (Chanhassen, Minnesota)
- Genre: Dance-pop
- Length: 49:03
- Labels: Virgin; Captive
- Producers: Peter Lord; Paisley Park; V. Jeffrey Smith; Don Was; Jorge Corante

Paula Abdul chronology
| Shut Up and Dance: Mixes (1990) | Spellbound (1991) | Head over Heels (1995) |

Singles from Spellbound
- 1. "Rush Rush" Released: April 24, 1991; 2. "The Promise of a New Day" Released: July 1991; 3. "Blowing Kisses in the Wind" Released: October 17, 1991; 4. "Vibeology" Released: October 21, 1991; 5. "Will You Marry Me?" Released: March 19, 1992

Professional ratings
Review scores
| Source | Rating |
|---|---|
| AllMusic | 3/5 stars |
| Chicago Tribune | 3/4 stars |
| Robert Christgau | (dud) |
| The Encyclopedia of Popular Music | 3/5 stars |
| Entertainment Weekly | C+ |
| Los Angeles Times | 2.5/4 stars |
| Music & Media | (favorable) |
| NME | 5/10 |
| Rolling Stone | 3/5 stars |
| Slant | 4/5 stars |

Spellbound is the second studio album by American singer Paula Abdul, released on May 14, 1991, via Virgin Records and Captive Records. Production was handled by Peter Lord, Paisley Park, V. Jeffrey Smith, Don Was, and Jorge Corante.

The album, although receiving mixed reviews citing that it showcased her limitations as a singer, became a commercial success and topped the US Billboard 200, alongside cracking the top-ten in Australia, Canada, Sweden, and the United Kingdom. Six singles in total were released, including the Billboard Hot 100 number one singles "Rush Rush" and "The Promise of a New Day", the latter becoming her sixth and to-date final number one single. Other singles included the US top-ten hit "Blowing Kisses in the Wind", "Vibeology", which Abdul performed at the 1991 MTV Video Music Awards, "Will You Marry Me?", and the Canada exclusive single "Alright Tonight". The album is currently certified 3× platinum in the United States.

Following the release of the album, Abdul embarked on her first world tour, entitled "Under My Spell Tour", between 1991 and 1992.

Spellbound won a Grammy Award for Best Recording Package. The album art was art directed by Melanie Nissen, designed by Inge Schaap, and lettered by Margo Chase.

== Critical reception ==
Writing for Entertainment Weekly, David Browne gave the album a C+ and remarked that its overproduction only highlights Abdul's limitations as a singer. In a retrospective review for Slant Magazine, Eric Henderson gave the album four out of five stars. He commented that, despite being uneven, the album makes Abdul "sound like a human being". In 2003, Slant Magazine included Spellbound in its list of "50 Essential Pop Albums".

== Commercial performance ==
The album debuted at number five on the Billboard 200 in its first week and rose four spots to number one the following week. It stayed at the summit for two consecutive weeks, selling 88,000 and 89,000 units respectively. The album distinguished itself by becoming the lowest selling number-one album in the Nielsen SoundScan era at the time of its release—a distinction it held until 2004, when Outkast's Speakerboxxx/The Love Below sold 86,000 copies while at number one. This was primarily due to the newly implemented SoundScan tracking system, which had not been implemented into every major music chain, thus sales were not entirely accurate. Nevertheless, the album became a best-seller and emerged as the best selling album for the month of June, spending 16 weeks within the top 10, and was certified three-times platinum by the RIAA in January 1992. Overall, the album spent 70 weeks on the Billboard 200 chart and was ranked as the 18th best-charting of the year 1991 (and 40th best-charting of the year 1992).

== Track listing ==
US and Canadian edition
| No. | Title | Writer(s) | Producer(s) | Length |
|---|---|---|---|---|
| 1. | "The Promise of a New Day^{[Q]}" | Paula Abdul; Peter Lord; Sandra St. Victor; V. Jeffrey Smith | Lord; Smith | 4:32 |
| 2. | "Rock House^{[Q]}" | Abdul; Lord; St. Victor; Smith | Lord; Smith | 4:11 |
| 3. | "Rush Rush" | Lord | Lord; Smith | 4:52 |
| 4. | "Spellbound^{[Q]}" | Abdul; Lord; St. Victor; Smith | Lord; Smith | 4:48 |
| 5. | "Vibeology" | Lord; St. Victor; Smith | Lord; Smith | 5:16 |
| 6. | "U^{[Q]}" | Prince | Paisley Park | 4:05 |
| 7. | "My Foolish Heart" | Lord; Smith | Lord; Smith | 4:10 |
| 8. | "Blowing Kisses in the Wind^{[Q]}" | Lord | Lord; Smith | 4:41 |
| 9. | "To You^{[Q]}" | Jorge Corante; Colin England | England; Corante | 3:31 |
| 10. | "Alright Tonight^{[Q]}" | John Hiatt | Don Was | 4:28 |
| 11. | "Will You Marry Me?" | Abdul; Lord; St. Victor; Smith | Lord; Smith | 4:24 |

International edition
| No. | Title | Writer(s) | Producer(s) | Length |
|---|---|---|---|---|
| 6. | "Will You Marry Me?" | Abdul; Lord; St. Victor; Smith | Lord; Smith | 4:24 |
| 7. | "U^{[Q]}" | Prince | Paisley Park | 4:05 |
| 8. | "My Foolish Heart" | Lord; Smith | Lord; Smith | 4:10 |
| 9. | "Blowing Kisses in the Wind^{[Q]}" | Lord | Lord; Smith | 4:41 |
| 10. | "To You^{[Q]}" | Jorge Corante; Colin England | England; Corante | 3:31 |
| 11. | "Alright Tonight^{[Q]}" | John Hiatt | Don Was | 4:28 |
| 12. | "Good Night, My Love (Pleasant Dreams)" | George Motola; John Marascalco | Was | 3:14 |

^{[Q]} denotes songs mixed using QSound.

== Personnel ==
- Paula Abdul – lead vocals, Synclavier II
- Sweet Pea Atkinson – backing vocals
- Sir Harry Bowens – backing vocals
- Sally Dworsky – backing vocals
- Colin England – backing vocals
- The Family Stand – backing vocals
- Peter Lord – backing vocals, keyboards, production
- Arnold McCuller – backing vocals
- Sandra St. Victor – backing vocals
- Mike Campbell – guitar
- Mark Goldenberg – guitar
- Randy Jacobs – guitar
- Clifford Moonie Pusey – guitar
- V. Jeffrey Smith – guitar, keyboards, production
- Jorge Corante – keyboards, production
- Tom Hammer – keyboards
- Ivan Neville – keyboards
- Jamie Muhoberac – organ
- Tim Drummond – bass
- Curt Bisquera – drums
- Rocky Bryant – drums
- Paulinho da Costa – percussion
- Greg Adams – trumpet
- Steve Grove – tenor saxophone
- Stephen Kupka – baritone saxophone
- Stevie Wonder – harmonica
- Stuart Canin – violin
- Billy Heaslip – lighting director
- Robert Lobetta – photography
- Wolfgang Aichholz – engineer
- Ed Cherney – engineer
- Don Feinerg – engineer
- Arne Frager – engineer
- Rod Hui – engineer
- Michael Koppelman – engineer
- Greg Laney – engineer
- Dave Pensado – engineer
- Don Was – production
- Paisley Park – production

== Charts ==
=== Weekly charts ===
Weekly chart performance for Spellbound
| Chart (1991) | Peak position |
|---|---|
| Australian Albums (ARIA) | 3 |
| Canada Top Albums/CDs (RPM) | 6 |
| European Albums (Music & Media) | 11 |
| Finnish Albums (Suomen virallinen lista) | 20 |
| French Albums (SNEP) | 36 |
| Dutch Albums (Album Top 100) | 45 |
| Japanese Albums (Oricon) | 12 |
| German Albums (Offizielle Top 100) | 17 |
| Hungarian Albums (MAHASZ) | 14 |
| New Zealand Albums (RMNZ) | 14 |
| Spanish Albums (Promusicae) | 48 |
| Swedish Albums (Sverigetopplistan) | 6 |
| Swiss Albums (Schweizer Hitparade) | 25 |
| UK Albums (Official Charts) | 4 |
| US Billboard 200 | 1 |
| US Top R&B/Hip-Hop Albums (Billboard) | 31 |

=== Year-end charts ===
Year-end chart performance for Spellbound
| Chart (1991) | Position |
|---|---|
| Australian Albums (ARIA) | 62 |
| Canada Top Albums/CDs (RPM) | 29 |
| European Albums (Music & Media) | 74 |
| German Albums (Offizielle Top 100) | 87 |
| Swedish Albums (Sverigetopplistan) | 27 |
| US Billboard 200 | 18 |
| Chart (1992) | Position |
| US Billboard 200 | 40 |

== Certifications ==
Certifications for Spellbound
| Region | Certification | Certified units/sales |
|---|---|---|
| Australia (ARIA) | Gold | 35,000^{^} |
| Canada (Music Canada) | 2× Platinum | 200,000^{^} |
| Japan (RIAJ) | Gold | 100,000^{^} |
| Sweden (GLF) | Platinum | 100,000^{^} |
| United Kingdom (BPI) | Gold | 100,000^{^} |
| United States (RIAA) | 3× Platinum | 3,000,000^{^} |
^{^} Shipments figures based on certification alone.
