= The Promise of a New Day =

1991 single by Paula Abdul

Single by Paula Abdul

from the album Spellbound
- Released: July 1991
- Studio: Studio Masters (Los Angeles); Sunset Sound (Los Angeles)
- Genre: Dance-pop; funk; new jack swing
- Length: 4:32 (album version); 4:13 (7-inch edit)
- Label: Virgin; Captive
- Songwriters: Paula Abdul; Peter Lord; Sandra St. Victor; V. Jeffrey Smith
- Producers: Peter Lord; V. Jeffrey Smith

Paula Abdul singles chronology
"Rush Rush" (1991)	"The Promise of a New Day" (1991)	"Blowing Kisses in the Wind" (1991)

Music video
- "The Promise of a New Day" on YouTube

"The Promise of a New Day" is a song by American singer Paula Abdul; it serves as the opening track to her second studio album, Spellbound (1991). The track, written by Abdul, Peter Lord, Sandra St. Victor, and V. Jeffrey Smith and produced by Lord and Smith, was released as the album's second single in July 1991 in the United States. The song lyrically finds Abdul singing optimistically about a relationship, with a vague sub-context of improvement of the world. It was also her first single released under her own label, Captive Records.

Despite mixed critical reception, "The Promise of a New Day" became another hit single for Abdul. It topped the US Billboard Hot 100 in September 1991, becoming Abdul's sixth and final number-one song as of 2026. Internationally the track entered the top 10 in Canada, the top 20 in Finland, and the top 40 in Australia, Belgium, the Netherlands, New Zealand, and Sweden.

== Background ==
In an interview with Songfacts, when asked how the song came to be, co-writer Peter Lord said, "Paula had an idea for the title and feel for the song and we built it from there."

== Critical reception ==
The song received mixed to positive reviews from music critics. In a review of Spellbound for the New York Times News Service republished in The Dispatch, Simon Reynolds said that the track "feebly gestures at the social-awareness-by-numbers of Janet Jackson's second album Rhythm Nation 1814." Billboard magazine gave the track a positive review saying it is "a lyrically uplifting ditty that percolates with an insinuating, new jack-ish groove." Dave Sholin of Gavin Report reviewed it favorably saying, "Backed by an intriguing beat, America's most lovable singer/dancer/choreographer provides another new twist to her familiar sound."

== Chart performance ==
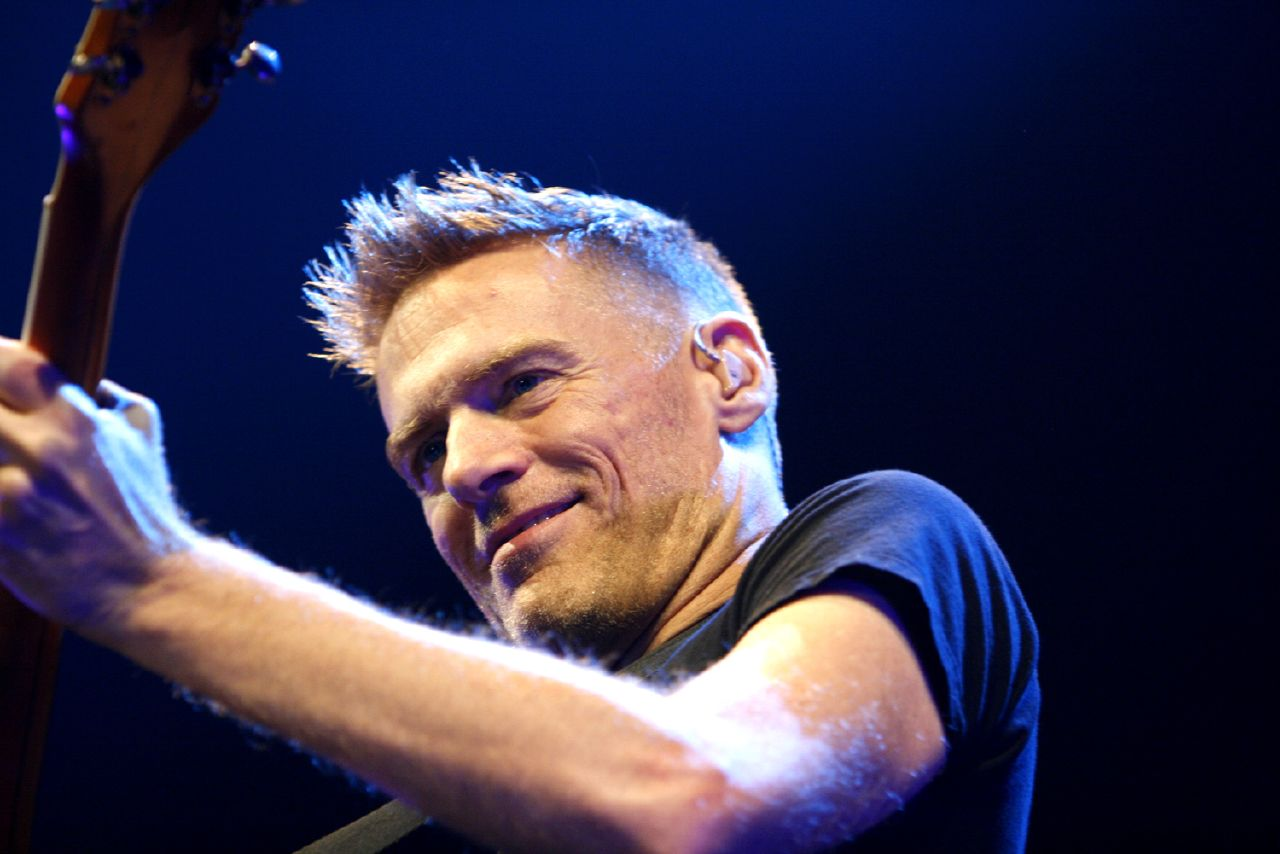
"The Promise of a New Day" displaced Bryan Adams's (pictured in 2007) "(Everything I Do) I Do It for You" from the top spot.

"The Promise of a New Day" debuted at number 40 on the US Billboard Hot 100 chart for the week ending July 20, 1991, claiming the spot of "Hot Shot Debut," meaning the highest new entry. The following week, the single climbed to No. 26, with this week claiming the Greatest Airplay Gainer. The song reached No. 1 on the chart on September 14, 1991, and ended the reign of Bryan Adams' long-running No. 1 hit, "Everything I Do (I Do It For You)". The following week, it fell to No. 5 and dropped off the top 40 only four weeks later. It was Abdul's sixth chart-topping single and her last No. 1 single to date. Its rapid tumble from the number one spot was attributed to the implementation of Nielsen SoundScan by Billboard in 1991, which provided more accuracy and was more sales-oriented; this affected other entries such as Roxette's "Fading Like a Flower (Every Time You Leave)". Abdul's declining success as a recording artist was evident in the performances of preceding singles, and she would only reach the top 40 four more times.

== Music video ==
Abdul in the video for "The Promise of a New Day".

The music video was directed by Big TV!, a duo made up of Andy Delaney and Monty Whitebloom, marking the first of multiple times Abdul would work with them. The live waterfall and tropical footage were filmed on location in Hawaii, but Abdul was unable to attend the shoot due to prior commitments. Filming and production took place on July 8, 1991, where Abdul and a number of background dancers filmed on a sound stage in Los Angeles and were later edited into the video through green screen. The video would be released on August 17, 1991, on MTV as an exclusive, where it was shortly placed on heavy rotation.

The video attracted controversy due to the fact that special lenses were used for filming. This was so that editors could fit in more dancers on screen, but it also unintentionally made Abdul look taller and a lot thinner than she actually was. The video was later mocked on In Living Color, where it was parodied as "Promise of a Thin Me" and took jabs at Abdul's singing voice and weight.

== Track listings ==
- US 7-inch and cassette single
- Canadian cassette single
- Australian 7-inch single
- Japanese mini-CD single
1. "The Promise of a New Day" (7-inch edit) – 4:13
2. "The Promise of a New Day" (West Coast 12-inch) – 5:35
- UK 7-inch and cassette single

A. "The Promise of a New Day" (7-inch edit) – 4:13
B. "The Promise of a New Day" (West Coast 7-inch edit) – 3:55

- UK and Australian 12-inch single
- UK CD single
1. "The Promise of a New Day" (7-inch edit) – 4:13
2. "The Promise of a New Day" (West Coast 12-inch) – 5:35
3. "The Promise of a New Day" (extended club version) – 6:50
- UK limited-edition 12-inch single

A1. "The Promise of a New Day" (West Coast 12-inch) – 5:35
B1. "The Promise of a New Day" (extended club version) – 6:50
B2. "The Promise of a New Day" (album version) – 4:32

== Charts ==
=== Weekly charts ===
Chart (1991)	Peak position
Australia (ARIA)	31
Belgium (Ultratop 50 Flanders)	39
Canada Retail Singles (The Record)	8
Canada Contemporary Hit Radio (The Record)	1
Canada Top Singles (RPM)	2
Canada Adult Contemporary (RPM)	13
Europe (European Dance Radio)	13
Europe (European Hit Radio)	15
Finland (Suomen virallinen lista)	15
Germany (GfK)	86
Luxembourg (Radio Luxembourg)	16
Netherlands (Dutch Top 40 Tipparade)	2
Netherlands (Single Top 100)	39
New Zealand (Recorded Music NZ)	26
Sweden (Sverigetopplistan)	37
UK Singles (Official Charts)	52
UK Airplay (Music Week)	18
US Billboard Hot 100	1
US Adult Contemporary (Billboard)	25
US Top 40 Radio Monitor (Billboard)	5
US Cash Box Top 100	1
US Adult Contemporary (Gavin Report)	18
US Crossover (Gavin Report)	4
US Top 40 (Gavin Report)	1
US Adult Contemporary (Radio & Records)	26
US Contemporary Hit Radio (Radio & Records)	1

=== Year-end charts ===
Chart (1991)	Position
Canada Top Singles (RPM)	32
Canada Adult Contemporary (RPM)	91
US Billboard Hot 100	41
US Cash Box Top 100	19
US Top 40 (Gavin Report)	23
US Contemporary Hit Radio (Radio & Records)	19

== Release history ==
Region	Date	Format(s)	Label(s)	Ref.
United States	July 1991	7-inch vinyl; cassette	Virgin	
Australia	August 12, 1991	7-inch vinyl; 12-inch vinyl; cassette	Virgin	
Australia	August 19, 1991	CD	Virgin	
United Kingdom	August 19, 1991	7-inch vinyl; 12-inch vinyl; CD; cassette	Virgin	
Japan	August 21, 1991	Mini-CD	Virgin	
