= Rush Rush (Paula Abdul song) =

1991 single by Paula Abdul

- Standard artwork (UK 12-inch vinyl single pictured)

Single by Paula Abdul

from the album Spellbound
- B-side: "Rush Rush" (dub mix)
- Released: April 24, 1991
- Recorded: 1990
- Studio: Greene Street (New York City); Z (Brooklyn, New York); Studio Masters (Los Angeles)
- Length: 4:56
- Label: Virgin
- Songwriter: Peter Lord
- Producer: Peter Lord & Vernon Jeffrey Smith

Paula Abdul singles chronology
"Opposites Attract" (1989)	"Rush Rush" (1991)	"The Promise of a New Day" (1991)

Music video
- "Rush Rush" on YouTube

"Rush Rush" is a song by American singer Paula Abdul, taken from her second studio album, Spellbound (1991). It was released on April 24, 1991, by Virgin Records as the lead single from the album. Written by Peter Lord and produced by Peter Lord and V. Jeffrey Smith (both members of the Family Stand), the song achieved success in the United States, where it topped the Billboard Hot 100, and became a worldwide hit.

== Background ==
"Rush Rush" was a departure for Abdul stylistically, as it was her first ballad released as a single, following the six uptempo singles from her debut LP. Lyrically, "Rush Rush" is about the desire for a lover who will give their all in a relationship.

First presented to Abdul as a demo by the Family Stand in 1990, she became intent on it becoming Spellbound's first single. In late 1990 at Studio Masters, Abdul laid down a scratch vocal for the track, which was never intended to make it to the song's final mix. However, the producers felt that its unpolished sound was needed to give the song its ingenuous tone, to match its subject matter and accompanying promotional video clip. The scratch vocal ended up on the final cut in March 1991.

== Chart performance ==
"Rush Rush" debuted on the US Billboard Hot 100 at number 36 on May 11, 1991, and reached number one five weeks later, on June 15, 1991, remaining there for five consecutive weeks. At the time, it was the longest-running number one since Madonna's "Like a Virgin" spent six weeks at number one during 1984 and 1985. The song also spent five weeks atop the Billboard Adult Contemporary chart. The song was ranked as the 64th-most-successful song of the 1990s in the United States. On the Billboard All Time chart between 1958 to 2018, the song ranked as the 77th-most successful single of all time in the United States. Outside of the U.S., the song also reached number one in Canada and number two in Australia. In the United Kingdom, "Rush Rush" peaked at number six on the UK Singles Chart.

== Music video ==
The video reimagines the 1955 James Dean/Natalie Wood film Rebel Without a Cause, including iconic location shots at Griffith Observatory, a black 1949 Mercury, and a climactic street race. With Keanu Reeves filling James Dean's role of Jim, opposite Abdul as Judy, several scenes from the movie are duplicated shot-for-shot. The video was directed by Stefan Würnitzer in April 1991 and produced by Karen Rohrbacher for Lucasfilm Commercial Productions. The British Top of the Pops aired an alternate version of the video, re-edited to contain more "performance shots" and less story. Many more shots of Abdul dancing in the orange dress were present.

== Track listings and formats ==
- 7-inch and cassette single
1. "Rush Rush" (7-inch edit) – 4:19
2. "Rush Rush" (dub mix) – 5:56
- 12-inch single

A1. "Rush Rush" (dub mix) – 5:56
B1. "Rush Rush" (album version) – 4:56
B2. "Rush Rush" (7-inch edit) – 4:19

- CD single
1. "Rush Rush" (7-inch edit) – 4:19
2. "Rush Rush" (album version) – 4:56
3. "Rush Rush" (dub edit) – 5:56
- Japanese mini-CD single
1. "Rush Rush" – 4:20
2. "Rush Rush" (dub mix) – 5:59

== Charts ==
=== Weekly charts ===
Chart (1991)	Peak position
Australia (ARIA)	2
Austria (Ö3 Austria Top 40)	23
Belgium (Ultratop 50 Flanders)	12
Canada Retail Singles (The Record)	1
Canada Contemporary Hit Radio (The Record)	1
Canada Top Singles (RPM)	1
Canada Adult Contemporary (RPM)	2
Denmark (IFPI)	9
Europe (Eurochart Hot 100)	9
Europe (European Airplay Top 50)	1
Europe (European Hit Radio)	1
Finland (Suomen virallinen lista)	13
France (SNEP)	24
Germany (GfK)	12
Greece (IFPI)	6
Ireland (IRMA)	11
Luxembourg (Radio Luxembourg)	3
Netherlands (Dutch Top 40)	9
Netherlands (Single Top 100)	6
New Zealand (Recorded Music NZ)	7
Norway (VG-lista)	9
Quebec (ADISQ)	1
Sweden (Sverigetopplistan)	7
UK Singles (Official Charts)	6
UK Airplay (Music Week)	2
US Billboard Hot 100	1
US Adult Contemporary (Billboard)	1
US Hot R&B/Hip-Hop Songs (Billboard)	20
US Cash Box Top 100	1

=== Year-end charts ===
Chart (1991)	Position
Australia (ARIA)	19
Belgium (Ultratop)	79
Canada Top Singles (RPM)	8
Canada Adult Contemporary (RPM)	12
Europe (Eurochart Hot 100)	55
Europe (European Hit Radio)	4
Germany (Media Control)	46
Netherlands (Dutch Top 40)	50
Netherlands (Single Top 100)	42
Sweden (Topplistan)	32
UK Singles (OCC)	56
US Billboard Hot 100	4
US Adult Contemporary (Billboard)	9
US Cash Box Top 100	3

=== Decade-end charts ===
Chart (1990–1999)	Position
Canada (Nielsen SoundScan)	48
US Billboard Hot 100	64

=== All-time charts ===
Chart (1958–2018)	Position
US Billboard Hot 100	77

== Certifications ==
Region	Certification	Certified units/sales
Australia (ARIA)	Gold	35,000^{^}
Sweden (GLF)	Gold	25,000^{^}
United States (RIAA)	Platinum	1,000,000^{‡}
^{^} Shipments figures based on certification alone.^{‡} Sales+streaming figures based on certification alone.

== Release history ==
Region	Date	Format(s)	Label(s)	Ref.
United States	April 24, 1991	7-inch vinyl; cassette	Virgin	
Australia	May 6, 1991	7-inch vinyl; 12-inch vinyl; cassette	Virgin; Captive	
Australia	May 13, 1991	CD	Virgin; Captive	
Japan	May 13, 1991	Mini-CD	Virgin Japan	
United Kingdom	June 10, 1991	7-inch vinyl; 12-inch vinyl; CD; cassette	Virgin; Captive	

== Cover versions ==
- Eliana recorded the song for her album "Primavera" with the title "Como um Beijo em Noite de Luar" ("Like a Kiss on a Moonlight Night"). It was released as a single.

== See also ==
- List of European number-one airplay songs of the 1990s
