= Like Water for Chocolate (album) =

Studio album by Common
- Released: March 28, 2000
- Recorded: 1999–2000; Electric Lady Studios (New York, New York); Studio A (Dearborn Heights, Michigan)
- Genres: Hip-hop; alternative hip-hop; conscious hip-hop; progressive rap
- Length: 77:51
- Label: MCA
- Producers: Questlove (also exec.); Common (co-exec.); Derek Dudley (co-exec.); J Dilla; James Poyser; DJ Premier; D'Angelo; Karriem Riggins

Common chronology
One Day It'll All Make Sense (1997)	Like Water for Chocolate (2000)	Electric Circus (2002)

Singles from Like Water for Chocolate
- 1. "The 6th Sense" Released: February 15, 2000; 2. "The Light" Released: July 18, 2000; 3. "Geto Heaven Remix T.S.O.I. (The Sound of Illadelph)" Released: April 16, 2001

Like Water for Chocolate is the fourth studio album by American rapper Common, released on March 28, 2000, through MCA Records. It was Common's first major label album and was both a critical and commercial breakthrough, receiving widespread acclaim from major magazine publications and selling 70,000 copies in its first week. The album was certified Gold on August 11, 2000, by the Recording Industry Association of America. According to Nielsen SoundScan, the album had sold 748,000 copies by March 2005. The video for "The Light" was frequently shown on MTV, adding to Common's exposure. The album also formally marked the formation of the Soulquarians, a collective composed of Questlove (of The Roots), J Dilla (formerly of Slum Village), keyboardist James Poyser, soul artist D'Angelo and bassist Pino Palladino, among numerous other collaborators. This group of musicians would also be featured on Common's next album, Electric Circus.

The album's cover photo, 1956 Alabama by Gordon Parks, is a photo of a young black woman in Alabama, dressed for church, and drinking from a "Colored Only" drinking fountain.

== Conception ==
=== Background ===
Following 1997's One Day It'll All Make Sense, Common moved to New York City where he began collaborating with the Soulquarians at Electric Lady Studios. It was there that Ahmir Thompson (Questlove) who oversaw the album's production, introduced Common to D'Angelo. Thompson had been doing a great deal of producing there with several members of the Soulquarians, including D'Angelo. The track "Geto Heaven Part Two" was originally supposed to be a track on D'Angelo's 2000 album Voodoo, but was traded for "Chicken Grease," a track which Common had intended to include on Like Water for Chocolate. Questlove on "Chicken Grease":

By mid '99 the Soulquarians were in full swing (D, Me, Jay Dee, James Poyser) and we were working on Common's Like Water for Chocolate when we came up with this lethal jam. It was so good that D pulled me to the side and said 'I ain't no Indian giver ... but I ain't lettin Com walk off with this song..' He called me 3 times that morning begging to ask Com for that track. Com agreed, and we named it 'Chicken Grease' after a phrase that Prince uses when he wants his guitarist to play a 9th minor chord while playing 16th notes.

— ?uestlove

=== Title significance ===
The title Like Water for Chocolate comes from the 1989 Laura Esquivel novel Like Water for Chocolate, which was adapted into the movie of the same name in 1992. The phrase "Like water for chocolate" is of Spanish origin (translated, como agua para chocolate). In many Latin American countries, hot chocolate is made with water rather than milk. The phrase refers to someone who has reached their boiling point, like water ready to be used to make chocolate. In an interview with Combustible the Poet, Common compared the main character Tita de la Garza's passion for food with his passion for music:

Actually the album is named after a movie of the same title. In the movie the main character was a really good cook. She would always be cooking for people. Whenever she would cook, she would really put a lot of emotion into it. So when people would eat her cooking, they were able to feel the same emotions she felt while cooking it. You feel me? So this is the same thing. I put all my heart, my mind and my rawness into these tracks. So I hope that people can feel that when they listen to the album.

In an interview on MTV, Common added:

I first saw the title and thought that it was real interesting, and I was like, 'Man, this is different.' It made me think, 'What does it mean?'. And it was appealing to me enough to dig into a meaning for it. So, I used "Like Water For Chocolate" to represent the water side in me, which is a Pisces, and the chocolate represents the soul, the blackness in the music.

Another popular interpretation of the album title ties in the phrase with the image on the cover of the album. Using the word 'chocolate' to symbolise people of dark skin color and the words 'like water' to describe the racially provocative concept of providing drinking water of exactly the same likeness for two different races alludes to the famous image and the themes of race that are found within the lyrical content of the album.

== Music ==
Like Water for Chocolate is notable for its Afrocentric themes. It borrows from the Afrobeat genre on the track "Time Travelin' (A Tribute To Fela)", the Tony Allen-sampling "Heat" and the Slum Village-assisted "Thelonius". MC Lyte and Mos Def join Common for the amusing "A Film Called (Pimp)" and "The Questions," respectively. In the former, Common sends up his own "conscious" image with a skit depicting him as a hypocritical woman-beater.

Like Common's previous two albums, Like Water for Chocolate closes with spoken word recited by Common's father Lonnie "Pops" Lynn. A slightly altered version of the album was released after its success on the charts, with the Macy Gray-assisted "Geto Heaven Remix T.S.O.I. (The Sound of Illadelph)" replacing the original.

=== Lyrical content ===
Like previous albums from Common, the subject matter discussed in Like Water for Chocolate is of a socially conscious nature. Typically, conscious hip-hop's greatest following is underground, and conscious hip-hop artists do not achieve great mainstream success. Yet despite being Common's first commercially successful album, Like Water for Chocolate maintains the same level of concern and social responsibility that had previously been seen in Common's first three albums. The album contains significant afrocentric elements which are particularly evident on "Time Travelin' (A Tribute to Fela)" and "Time Travelin' (Reprise)." Both tracks discuss the ills of modern society and are a tribute to Fela Kuti, a pioneer of Afrobeat music and a prominent human rights activist, with "Time Travelin' (Reprise) featuring Kuti's son, Femi Kuti. Track 2, "Heat" samples Tony Allen, Fela Kuti's one-time fellow band member and co-founder of the Afrobeat genre.

Also unique are "Payback is a Grandmother" and "A Song for Assata." "Payback is a Grandmother" is a continuation of the series of "Stolen Moment" songs that appeared on One Day It'll All Make Sense, whereby Common weaves a fictional tale in which he pursues a thief (on this occasion the thugs who have robbed his grandmother). Amidst the intricate caper, the song emphasizes the importance of family values. As Common says in the song's intro "I don't know what was on y'all niggaz birds to go up to the boat—and start robbin old folks". The song ends in a skit involving police officers at the scene of a crime where, breaking out of character, one of the officers can be heard saying "the skit definitely needs more added to it ... Someone get Prince Paul on the phone please"—the last remark recognizing Prince Paul's reputation as a pioneer of the album skit.

"A Song for Assata" chronicles the arrest, trial, incarceration and Cuban political asylum of Assata Shakur (a member of the Black Panther Party, after whom Common named his daughter, Omoye Assata Lynn). The spoken-word piece at the end of the track is a quote from Assata Shakur. During the album's creation, Common traveled to Havana, Cuba, where he met and talked with Shakur. The excerpt used details Shakur's thoughts on what freedom is and what it means to be free. As she notes:

I know a whole more about what freedom isn't
Than about what it is, cause I've never been free.
I can only share my vision with you of the future, about what freedom is.

Working as both a battle song and self-reflection, the sensuous "Nag Champa (Afrodisiac for the World)" sees Common proclaiming himself "The Earth, Wind, and Fire of hip hop" while admitting "By Rakim and Short I been inspired"—a comment which compounds the two very contrasting rap artists. Common goes on to note:

The mind is funny, how it's spent on gettin' it [money]
I'm sittin wit descendants of Abraham
Who say the jam is "Money, Cash, Hoes"

"Nag Champa" is one of the rare occurrences in which Common's frequent collaborator, producer J Dilla, takes on the role of singer. Common later explained:

When I was working on Like Water for Chocolate I would go to Detroit like two to three times a month. When we would go to Jay Dee's basement we would always burn nag champa incense, that's where I got that title from. I was listening to Slum Village a lot, so I was influenced by them. With "Nag Champa," which was either the first or the second song for Like Water for Chocolate, we had it for a long time with no chorus. We kept trying but there wasn't nothing good coming out. I took T3 and them to the studio to work with me on the chorus; T3 started chanting something, he didn't finish, but he had a little idea. Jay Dee heard and started really singing it and got it together. Jay had an incredible voice-he actually was going to do a singing album. We used to talk about that when he would stay in LA.

— Common

=== Production ===
Although Questlove was the album's executive producer, a large deal of the production work was handled by Jay Dee (aka J Dilla) of Slum Village and The Ummah. Common and Jay Dee both hailed from the Great Lakes region (Jay Dee from Detroit and Common from Chicago) and were good friends. The track "Thelonius" was even placed on both Like Water for Chocolate and Slum Village's 2000 release Fantastic, Vol. 2.

Common also wanted to work with DJ Premier, citing Gang Starr as one of his favorite groups to listen to. In an interview with New Jeru Poet, Common described his motivation to work with DJ Premier:

Like you said, being that he is one of the most respected producers, I really loved his music throughout the time. Gang Starr has always been one of my favorite groups. I've always wanted to work with him. It was time. I connected with him and seen him in a couple of places. I told him that I wanted to work with him. It took a little time to get up with him but eventually, we got up. That was the last song I recorded for 'Like Water For Chocolate'. We released 'Dooinit' first and then the single and video for 'The 6th Sense'. Then, we followed it up with 'The Light'.

== Reception ==
Professional ratings
Review scores
Source	Rating
AllMusic	4.5/5 stars
Consumer Guide	A−
Entertainment Weekly	B
NME	8/10
Pitchfork	8.7/10
Rolling Stone	3.5/5 stars
The Rolling Stone Album Guide	4/5 stars
The Source	4/5 stars
Spin	8/10
USA Today	3.5/4 stars

Like Water for Chocolate received widespread acclaim from music critics. Rolling Stone's Kris Ex called Common "a hip-hop MC willing to actually examine himself through his art". NME's Stevie Chick described him as a "great storyteller" who is "equal parts philosopher and documentarian." Spin's Peter S. Scholtes praised Like Water for Chocolate as "his most aggressive and powerful record yet", and The Wire also hailed it as his best album. Akiba Solomon of The Source wrote that the album finds "a more worldly Common ... creating full-fledged jazz, funk and soul songs". In Mojo, Andy Gill called Like Water for Chocolate the "most user-friendly contribution so far to the wave of 'conscious' rap." RapReviews critic Steve "Flash" Juon wrote: "From 'Payback is a Grandmother' all the way to the finale 'Pop's Rap III' you'll find your ears have been smothered in a sweet darkness that Dove has never been able to wrap in foil and sell for ninety-nine cents. You may in fact be coming down off a hip-hop sugar high. Not to worry – just hit random play and any track on this album will give you another fix."

Q described Like Water for Chocolate as "wholemeal hip hop: chewy and a wee bit bland but nutritious all the same." In a mixed review, Sal Cinquemani of Slant Magazine felt that the album "certainly attempts to make change (musically and socially), but part of my disappointment comes from the high expectations that naturally arise when an artist tries to break from the norm", concluding that "maybe if there were more hip-hop artists like him, the burden wouldn't be placed solely on one rapper's shoulders."

In 2004, PopMatters' Marc Lamont Hill named the album his personal favorite, writing:

To me, a favorite album isn't necessarily the best album in the collection. A favorite album is the one that you wrap yourself in when you're feeling happy, sad, angry, lonely, or nostalgic. A favorite album is the one that you feel personally connected to in ways that are difficult to explain. For me, that album is Common's Like Water For Chocolate.

— Marc Lamont Hill

The music online magazine Pitchfork placed Like Water for Chocolate at number 169 on their list of top 200 albums of the 2000s.

The album's hit single, "The Light" received a 2001 Grammy Award nomination for Best Rap Solo Performance.

The album was included in the book 1001 Albums You Must Hear Before You Die.

=== Accolades ===
Publication	Country	Accolade	Year	Rank
Addicted to Noise	USA	Albums of the Year	2000	19
Aftenposten	Norway	Albums of the Year	2000	33
Amazon.com	USA	Albums of the Year	2000	61
Barnes & Noble.com	USA	Albums of the Year	2000	54
BigO	Singapore	Albums of the Year	2000	4
Dagsavisen	Norway	Albums of the Year	2000	13
Ink Blot Magazine	USA	Albums of the Year	2000	3
Iguana	Spain	Albums of the Year	2000	24
Intro	Germany	Albums of the Year	2000	2
Les Inrockuptibles	France	Albums of the Year	2000	21
Musik Express/Sounds	Germany	Albums of 2000	2001	28
Muzik Magazine	UK	Albums of the Year	2000	10
Natt & Dag	Norway	Albums of the Year	2000	—
Nöjesguiden	Sweden	Albums of the Year	2000	2
Trax	France	Albums of the Year	2000	62
OOR	Netherlands	Albums of the Year	2000	45
Rock de Lux	Spain	Albums of the Year	2000	6
Spex	Germany	Albums of the Year	2000	9
The Village Voice	USA	2000 Pazz & Jop Poll	2000	24
Wall of Sound	USA	Albums of the Year	2000	17
Zundfunk	Germany	Albums of the Year	2000	6

=== Later albums ===
Following the success of LWFC, Common continued collaborating with the Soulquarians for his next album, Electric Circus. It featured the Soulquarians more prominently than Like Water for Chocolate, but was not nearly as successful because of its more eclectic vision, and relatively poor promotion from MCA Records. Electric Circus was considered a commercial disappointment, selling just over 200,000 copies, whereas its predecessor sold over twice as many.

== Track listing ==
Original Release
No.	Title	Writer(s)	Producer(s)	Length
1.	"Time Travelin' (A Tribute to Fela)" (featuring Vinia Mojica, Roy Hargrove and Femi Kuti)	Lonnie Lynn; Michael Archer; Ahmir Thompson; James Poyser; James Yancey	D'Angelo; Questlove; James Poyser; J Dilla	6:37
2.	"Heat"	Lynn	J Dilla	3:41
3.	"Cold Blooded" (featuring Rahzel, Roy Hargrove and Black Thought)	Lynn; Thompson; Archer; Rahzel Brown; Tariq Trotter; Kelo Saunders; George Clinton Jr.; Glenn Goins; Garry Shider	D'Angelo; Questlove; Kelo Saunders; The Roots	4:58
4.	"Dooinit"	Lynn; Yancey	J Dilla	3:37
5.	"The Light"	Lynn; Yancey; Bobby Caldwell; Norman Harris; Bruce Malament	J Dilla	4:21
6.	"Funky for You" (featuring Bilal and Jill Scott)	Lynn; Yancey; Poyser; Bilal Oliver	J Dilla; James Poyser	5:55
7.	"The Questions" (featuring Mos Def)	Lynn; Yancey; Poyser; Dante Smith	J Dilla; James Poyser	4:09
8.	"Time Travelin' (Reprise)"	Lynn; Archer; Thompson; Poyser; Yancey	D'Angelo; Questlove; James Poyser; J Dilla	1:33
9.	"The 6th Sense" (featuring Bilal)	Lynn; Oliver; Christopher Martin; Kejuan Muchita; Albert Johnson	DJ Premier	5:19
10.	"A Film Called (Pimp)" (featuring Bilal and MC Lyte)	Lynn; Yancey; Oliver	J Dilla	6:05
11.	"Nag Champa (Afrodisiac for the World)"	Lynn; Yancey	J Dilla	5:10
12.	"Thelonius" (featuring Slum Village)	Lynn; Yancey; Titus Glover; R.L. Altman III	J Dilla	4:41
13.	"Payback Is a Grandmother"	Lynn; Yancey; James Brown; Fred Wesley; John Starks	J Dilla	4:30
14.	"Geto Heaven Part Two" (featuring D'Angelo)	Lynn; Thompson; Archer; Peter Lord; Sandra St. Victor; Vernon Smith	D'Angelo; Questlove; James Poyser	5:18
15.	"A Song for Assata" (featuring Cee-Lo)	Lynn; Poyser; Thomas Burton	James Poyser	6:48
16.	"Pops Rap III... All My Children" (featuring Lonnie "Pops" Lynn)	Lonnie Lynn Sr.; Erykah Badu; Anthony Scott; Karriem Riggins	Karriem Riggins	5:09
Total length:				77:51

Alternate version
No.	Title	Writer(s)	Producer(s)	Length
14.	"Geto Heaven Remix T.S.O.I. (The Sound of Illadelph)" (featuring Macy Gray)	Lynn; Thompson; Poyser	Questlove; James Poyser	5:18
Total length:				5:18

Sample credits

- "Cold Blooded" contains elements from "Funkin' for Fun", written by George Clinton Jr., Glenn Goins, and Garry Shider; performed by Parliament.
- "The Light" contains elements from "Open Your Eyes", written by Bobby Caldwell, Norman Harris, and Bruce Malament; performed by Bobby Caldwell.
- "The 6th Sense" contains elements from "Allustrious", written by Kejuan Muchita and Albert Johnson; performed by Mobb Deep.
- "Payback Is a Grandmother" contains elements from "The Payback", written by James Brown, Fred Wesley, and John Starks; performed by James Brown.
- "Geto Heaven Part Two" contains replayed elements from "Ghetto Heaven", written by Peter Lord, Sandra St. Victor, and Vernon Smith.
- "Pops Rap III... All My Children" contains re-sung elements from "Next Lifetime", written by Erykah Badu and Anthony Scott.

* Track listing, production credits, and sample credits are taken from the album's liner notes.

== Personnel ==
- Common – lead vocals (1–15), handclaps (3)

Musicians

- Dwight Adams – trumpet (16)
- Baatin – additional vocals (11, 12), handclaps (11)
- Bilal – background vocals (6, 9, 10)
- Black Thought – background vocals (3), handclaps (3)
- D'Angelo – lead vocals (14), piano (14), additional keyboards (1, 8), claves (3), handclaps (3)
- Orrin Evans – keyboards (16)
- Larry Gold – string arrangements and conducting (15)
- Richie Goods – bass
- Cee-Lo Green – background vocals (15)
- Roy Hargrove – trumpet (1, 3, 8), handclaps (3)
- Stephon Harris – vibes (16)
- Antonio Hart – flute (10, 14)
- Jay Dee – lead vocals (2), background vocals (11), additional vocals (2, 12), scratches and cuts (2, 4, 13)
- Jef Lee Johnson – guitar (1, 8, 11, 15)
- Femi Kuti – additional vocals (1)
- Monie Love – background vocals (7)
- Lonnie "Pops" Lynn – lead vocals (16)
- MC Lyte – additional vocals (10)
- Melina – congas (1, 8)
- Vinia Mojica – additional vocals (1, 8)
- Pino Palladino – bass (14)
- John Paxton – trombone (16)
- James Poyser – harp (14), Rhodes (14, 15), OBE (14), bass (15), organ (15), vocoder (6), additional keyboards (5), handclaps (3)
- DJ Premier – scratches and cuts (9)
- Questlove – drums (3, 14, 15), bass (3), handclaps (3)
- Rahzel – background vocals (3)
- Karriem Riggins – drums (16)
- Jill Scott – background vocals (6)
- Mista Sinista – scratches and cuts (10, 13)
- T3 – additional vocals (11, 12), handclaps (11)

Technical personnel

- Terry Baily – assistant engineer (10)
- Tom Coyne – mastering
- Dave Dar – assistant engineer (1, 6, 8)
- Vidal Davis – vocal engineer (1, 8)
- Russell Elevado – engineer (3, 14), mixing (1, 3, 8, 10, 14)
- Todd Fairall – engineer (2, 4–7, 10–13)
- Andy Haller – engineer (10)
- Jason Hofer – assistant engineer (2)
- John Horesco – assistant engineer (15)
- Nick Hura – assistant engineer (4, 5, 10, 11)
- Dylan Koski-Budabin – assistant engineer (5–7, 11–13)
- Steve Mandel – assistant mix engineer (1–4, 8, 10, 14)
- Kevin Packer – engineer (15)
- Joe Pirrera – engineer (1, 6, 8)
- Bob Power – mixing (2, 4–7, 11–13, 15, 16)
- Eddie Sancho – mixing (9)
- Kenyatta Saunders – engineer (3)
- John Seymour – engineer (16), assistant engineer (13)
- Dexter Thibou – engineer (9, 12), assistant mix engineer (9, 12)
- Ahmir Thompson – mixing (1, 3, 8, 10, 14)
- Michael Tocci – engineer (12, 15), assistant engineer (6, 10, 13, 14), assistant mix engineer (6, 7, 12, 13, 15, 16)

== Charts ==
=== Weekly charts ===
Chart (2000)	Peak position
UK R&B Albums (Official Charts)	19
US Billboard 200	16
US Top R&B/Hip-Hop Albums (Billboard)	5

=== Year-end charts ===
Chart (2000)	Position
US Billboard 200	156
US Top R&B/Hip-Hop Albums (Billboard)	46

=== Singles ===
Year	Title	US Pop	US R&B	US Rap	US Rhythmic
2000	"The Light"	44	12	13	21
2000	"The 6th Sense"	—	87	14	—
2001	"Geto Heaven, Part 2"	—	61	—	—

== Certifications ==
Region	Certification	Certified units/sales
United States (RIAA)	Gold	500,000^{^}
^{^} Shipments figures based on certification alone.
