= Moon in Scorpio (The Family Stand album) =

Studio album by the Family Stand
- Released: 1991
- Genre: Rock, R&B, funk
- Label: East West
- Producer: The Family Stand

The Family Stand chronology
| Chain (1990) | Moon in Scorpio (1991) | Connected (1998) |

Moon in Scorpio is an album by the American band the Family Stand, released in 1991. The album was a commercial disappointment, with the band receiving more attention for its contributions to Paula Abdul's Spellbound.

== Production ==
The album was produced by the Family Stand. Vernon Reid contributed some guitar parts. "Plantation Radio" is about the needless segregation found in radio programming playlists. "The Education of Jamie" is about the omnipresence of white culture.

== Critical reception ==
Professional ratings
Review scores
| Source | Rating |
|---|---|
| AllMusic | 4/5 stars |
| Boston Herald | A |
| Robert Christgau | (dud) |
| Los Angeles Times | 3/4 stars |
| The Rolling Stone Album Guide | 3.5/5 stars |

Billboard declared that Sandra St. Victor "has the sassiness of Tina Turner and the range of Chaka Khan." The New York Times called Moon in Scorpio a "full-bodied meltdown of soul, hip-hop and corrosive psychedelia," writing that "the Family Stand is fighting for musical and polemic freedom in a pop world where black artists are supposed to submit to cosmetic surgeons and let their whizbang producers do the talking." The Washington Post considered it "a potent hard-rock-and-funk concoction that rings with blood-sweat-and-tears intensity."

AllMusic wrote that the album's "meaty blend of R&B and rock was a creative triumph," and called it "an underexposed gem that's well worth searching for." The Rolling Stone Album Guide deemed it "a tripped out explosion of talent."

== Track listing ==
| No. | Title | Length |
|---|---|---|
| 1. | "New World Order" | 3:38 |
| 2. | "Shades of Blue" | 5:04 |
| 3. | "You'll Never Be" | 4:36 |
| 4. | "Plantation Radio" | 4:58 |
| 5. | "Sky Is Falling" | 4:57 |
| 6. | "Shelter" | 4:23 |
| 7. | "Winter in My Heart" | 5:12 |
| 8. | "Free Spirit" | 5:09 |
| 9. | "Moon in Scorpio" | 7:15 |
| 10. | "Quiet Desperation" | 4:58 |
| 11. | "Chakra Love" | 5:05 |
| 12. | "In the Midst of Revolution" | 1:41 |
| 13. | "The Education of Jamie" | 7:06 |
| 14. | "Where Does Mommy Live?" | 5:08 |
| 15. | "Say Love" | 4:46 |
| 16. | "Boom Shock" | 1:19 |

== Personnel ==
- Peter Lord – keyboards, vocals
- V. Jeffrey Smith – multiple instruments
- Sandra St. Victor – vocals
