= Mark de Clive-Lowe =

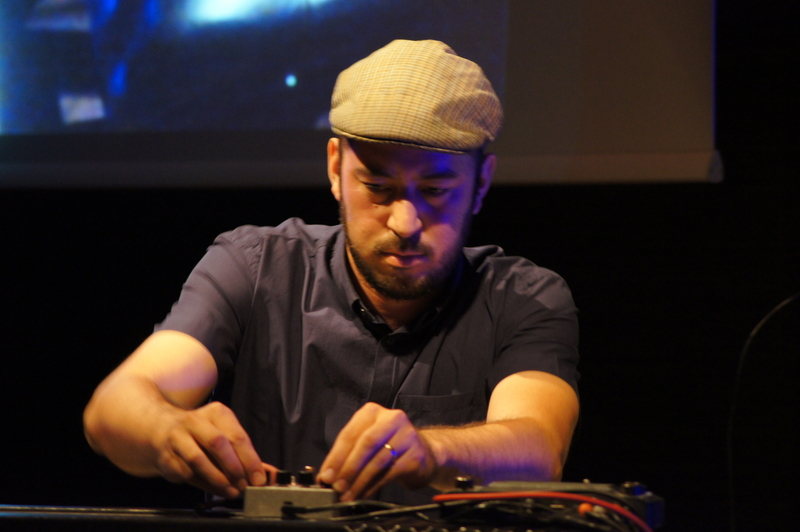
- Mark de Clive-Lowe performs live on 54th Ljubljana Jazz Festival in Ljubljana, Slovenia on 6 July 2013.

Background information
- Born: Mark de Clive-Lowe; 16 August 1974 (age 51)
- Origin: New Zealand
- Genres: Jazz, R&B, dance, electronic, pop
- Occupations: Musician, deejay, music producer
- Instruments: Keyboards, piano, electronics
- Years active: 1995–present
- Website: https://www.mdcl.tv

Mark de Clive-Lowe (born 16 August 1974) is a Japan-based Japanese-New Zealand musician, composer, DJ and producer raised in Auckland and now based in Tokyo, Japan.

== Early life ==
Born in Auckland, New Zealand, de Clive-Lowe was raised bi-culturally and bilingually by his Japanese mother, and New Zealand father who had previously lived for over two decades in Japan. He cites his family upbringing in New Zealand as culinarily, culturally, and linguistically Japanese as well as traditionally patriarchal.

At the age of 4 he was enrolled in piano lessons by his father. He developed an early awareness of jazz through his father's record collection and oldest brother's piano playing, although his formal musical training remained predominantly classical throughout his childhood.

De Clive-Lowe spent time growing up and cultivating musical influences in both New Zealand and Japan. His initial exposure to Japanese culture outside of home life came from visiting every summer with his family from the age of 10. During his early teenage years in New Zealand, exposure to New jack swing through friends sparked an interest in other musical genres alongside his classical training. Experimentation with synths and collecting imported hip hop on vinyl earned him his first production and electronic music experiences, and provided the opportunity to collaborate with local hip hop and R&B artists. He moved to Japan alone to complete his final year of high school, and cites immersion in the Tokyo jazz club scene during that year as a key factor in his decision, on return to his family in New Zealand, to definitively pursue a career in music over planned higher education in law.

In 1994, Mark studied jazz at Berklee College of Music for two semesters. He dropped out and returned to New Zealand in 1995 seeking immersion in the professional jazz music scene.

== Music career ==
In 1996, De Clive-Lowe toured Japan as part of a jazz trio with bassist Tomokazu Sugimoto and drummer Nobuaki Fuji.

De Clive-Lowe came to international prominence during his decade living in London, UK. From 1998 to 2008 de Clive-Lowe was a regular collaborator with a community of producers including Bugz in the Attic, 4Hero and Restless Soul. He is a veteran of the UK's broken beat movement, blending jazz, electronics, funk and percussion-heavy world music. He has been involved with over 200 releases, collaborating artists including Lauryn Hill, Jody Watley, Shirley Horn, UK soul singer Omar, percussionist Sammy Figueroa, bass player Pino Palladino.

Having recorded two locally released solo albums for New Zealand independent label Tap Records in the late 1990s (plus an album as a member of the group Jazz in the Present Sense), his third album Six Degrees was released worldwide in 2000 (Universal Jazz/emarcy). De Clive-Lowe released his next full-length album Tide's Arising 22 March 2005 on ABB Soul/Antipodean and Columbia in Japan. The album features Pino Palladino and Bémbé Ségué. Tide's Arising was cited as one of the most groundbreaking new jazz albums from the UK in 2005.

Mark de Clive-Lowe's 2012 solo album, Renegades, was released 14 November 2011 on Tru Thoughts Records. The album features Omar, Sheila E., Nia Andrews, Tawiah, Ovasoul7 and Sandra Nkake. The Why featuring Nia Andrews was released as the first single in early October 2011. His 2013 album is a collaboration with the Rotterdam Jazz Orchestra Take the Space Trane (Tru Thoughts) recorded live at De Doelen, Rotterdam. He has also produced all tracks on the studio album for US singer Sy Smith, Fast and Curious released in March 2012 and all tracks on the studio album for US singer Sandra St. Victor of The Family Stand, Oya's Daughter released September 2013.

The 2014 album Church features guests including Miguel Atwood-Ferguson, Nia Andrews, Robin Eubanks et al. showcases the club night party "Church" de Clive-Lowe founded with Nia Andrews in Santa Monica, CA in 2010. A mixture of jazz club, dance club and live remix experiment, the event has been resident in Los Angeles, New York and done pop ups in Chicago and Philadelphia. The album was remixed by international DJ/producers for the 2015 Church Remixed release. In 2016, de Clive-Lowe released his tribute to Blue Note Records with #Bluenoteremixed Vol.1. Recorded live in one take, the mixtape style release sees de Clive-Lowe remixing samples from the Blue Note Records catalogue on the fly, joined by guests including Illa J, Bambu, John Robinson, Pino Palladino, Nia Andrews and Nomad Pendergrast.

2017's release Live at the Blue Whale was recorded at downtown LA's Blue Whale jazz club with de Clive-Lowe on piano, keyboards and live electronics and drum programming along with saxophonist Josh Johnson, bassist Brandon Eugene Owens and Gene Coye on drums paying tribute to his own inspirational favourites: Yusef Lateef, Sun Ra and Ahmad Jamal.

He is a recipient of the 2021 U.S.-Japan Creative Artists Fellowship.

=== Mashibeats ===
In 2010, de Clive-Lowe formed independent record label Mashibeats (pronounced 'mash-ee'), honouring a nickname given to him by Kaidi Tatham of Bugz in the Attic. Much of his own music has been self-released on Mashibeats throughout his career.

De Clive-Lowe is a proponent of community engagement models of creator funding. He has hosted events promoting the potential benefits of blockchain technology for artists in a Web3 economy. His album Motherland, filmed while on an artist residency in Japan in summer 2019, was minted and sold as an NFT.

In 2020, he began creating a community engagement model around Mashibeats funded through the use of "$MASHI" coin, a form of tradeable digital asset backed by the Rally token ($RLY), a sidechain to Ethereum. The "$MASHI" coin can be used gain exclusive access to De Clive-Lowe's new music releases, community music events, or to purchase NFTs allowing participation in Mashibeats community competitions.

== Personal life ==
De Clive Lowe has a son, Masina, born in 2003.

He has two brothers. His eldest brother, Ian, exposed him to live jazz in Auckland at a young age.

== Discography ==
=== Albums ===
- past present (tone poems across time) (Impressive Collective / Barely Breaking Even, 2025)
- Hotel San Claudio (Soul Bank / !K7 Music, 2023)
- Freedom: Celebrating the Music of Pharoah Sanders (Soul Bank / !K7 Music, 2022)
- Motherland (self-released, not on label, 2022)
- Dreamweavers (Mother Tongue, 2020)
- CHURCH Sessions (World Galaxy / Alpha Pup, 2019)
- Heritage II (Ropeadope, 2019)
- Heritage (Ropeadope, 2019)
- Live at the Blue Whale (Mashibeats/ Ropeadope, 2017)
- #Bluenoteremixed Vol. 1 (self-released, not on label, 2016)
- Church Remixed (Mashibeats/Ropeadope, 2015)
- Church (Mashibeats/Ropeadope, 2014)
- Take the Space Trane with the Rotterdam Jazz Orchestra (Tru Thoughts, 2013)
- Renegades (Tru Thoughts, 2012)
- Leaving This Planet (Mashibeats, 2011)
- Journey 2 the Light (Freedom School [Jp], 2007)
- Freesoul Sessions Vol. 1 (Antipodean, 2007)
- The Politik (Antipodean, 2006)
- Face (Columbia Japan, 2006)
- Tide's Arising (Columbia Japan, 2004; Antipodean/ABB Soul, 2005)
- Melodius Beats Vol. 1 (Antipodean, 2003)
- Six Degrees (Kog Transmissions/Universal, 2000)
- Island of Nuvonesia (Kog Transmissions [NZ], 2000)
- Vision (Tap, 1997)
- First Thoughts (Tap Records [NZ], 1996)

=== EPs ===
- Bread & Souls: A Family Gathering Chapter 4 (Mashibeats/Minipan 2024)
- Bread & Souls: A Family Gathering Chapter 3 (Mashibeats/Minipan 2024)
- Bread & Souls: A Family Gathering Chapter 2 (Mashibeats/Minipan 2024)
- Bread & Souls: A Family Gathering Chapter 1 (Mashibeats/Minipan 2024)
- Midnight Snacks Vol. 4 (Mashibeats, 2024)
- Midnight Snacks Vol. 3 (Mashibeats, 2022)
- Midnight Snacks Vol. 2 (Mashibeats, 2021)
- Midnight Snacks Vol. 1 (Mashibeats, 2021)
- Freesoul Sessions EP03 (Antipodean)
- Freesoul Sessions EP02 (Antipodean)
- Freesoul Sessions EP01 (Antipodean)
- Tide's Arising Album Sampler (Antipodean)
- Day by Day/El dia perfecto Remixes – (Universal Jazz)
- State of the Mental/Traveling Remixes (ABB Soul/Antipodean)

=== Singles ===
- "heart"
- "Dragon" (featuring Al Fraser, Mahina-Ina Kingi-Kaui)
- "Tiger" (featuring Al Fraser)
- "Moonlight" (featuring Blu)
- "Twilight" (feat. Lady Alma)
- "Keep It Moving" (feat. Lady Alma)
- "Mezmerized" (feat. Lyric L)
- "4.Y.V."
- "Relax...Unwind" (feat. Abdul Shyllon)
- "The Way That It Goes" (feat. Maiya James)
- "Nites Like These"
- "Move on Up" (feat. Cherie Mathieson)
- "Better Days"/"Chocolate Sunday"
- "Truth" (with Sy Smith)
- "Lovergirl (Syberized)" (with Sy Smith)
- "The Why"(feat. Nia Andrews)
