= Progressive rap =

Subgenre of hip-hop music

- Other names: Progressive hip-hop
- Stylistic origins: Hip-hop; avant-garde; jazz; rock; soul
- Cultural origins: 1980s–1990s, United States
- Typical instruments: Vocals; sampler; bass; keyboard; drums; guitar
- Derivative forms: Homo hop; political hip-hop

Other topics
- Alternative hip-hop; gangsta rap; golden age hip-hop; progressive music; underground hip-hop

Progressive rap (or progressive hip-hop) (Note: "Hip-hop" is traditionally used by academics and intellectuals within hip-hop culture to distinguish the culture's aspects of artistic authenticity and political consciousness from more problematic dimensions that are instead relegated under the term "rap", such as commercialism, violence, and sexism, according to Marc Lamont Hill. Writing in 2010, Hill explains that this "hip-hop/rap" spectrum is often used as a theoretical framework to "evaluate hip-hop artists" and "enables fans, artists, and critics to mimic the elitist postures of earlier European traditions by creating high/low distinctions within the culture.") is a broad subgenre of hip-hop that aims to progress the genre thematically with socially transformative ideas and musically with stylistic experimentation. Developing through the works of innovative US hip-hop acts during the 1980s and 1990s, it has also been known at various points as conscious, underground, and alternative hip-hop.

Progressive rap music critically examines social issues, political responsibility, and existential concerns, particularly in the context of African-American life and youth culture. Common themes include social injustice, inequality, status, identity, and religion, with discourses around ideologies such as Afrocentricity and Black religiosity. Unlike the genre's more commercially-dominant counterpart gangsta rap, prog-rap artists typically disavow intracultural violence and economic materialism in favor of constructive and educational responses such as consciousness, uplift, heritage, humor, and activism.

Productions in the genre often take on avant-garde approaches and wide-ranging influences, such as jazz, rock, and soul. Examples have included the works of De La Soul, Fugees, Outkast, early Kanye West, and Kendrick Lamar. The music of such acts, especially in the 21st century, has impacted the mainstream sensibilities of hip-hop while countering racist stereotypes pervasive in Western popular culture.

== Themes and characteristics ==
While progressive hip-hop culture functions as the voice of resistance for America's black youth, it also provides a blueprint for the possibilities of social change and has been utilized as a politicizing tool to inform youth about significant social problems.

— Shawn Ginwright (2004)

Progressive rap music is defined by its critical themes around societal concerns such as structural inequalities and political responsibility. According to Lincoln University professor and author Emery Petchaur, artists in the genre frequently analyze "structural, systematic, and reproduced" sources of oppression and inequality in the world, while Anthony B. Pinn of Rice University describes it as a form of hip-hop that examines dehumanizing social conditions and cycles of poverty "producing limited life options and despair". Meanwhile, academics Shawn Ginwright and Julio Cammarota observe critiques of racism, colonialism, capitalism, and patriarchy that are intended to raise consciousness of social issues and politicize young people into activism. Petchaur, drawing from her experiences teaching high school, adds that the music frequently makes connections to critical consciousness that can variously shape the intellectual sensibilities of young students who are "deeply invested in hip hop".

In the context of other rap forms, progressive hip-hop is identified as a thematic subset alongside "status rap", which expresses concerns about social status and mobility, and gangsta rap, which examines similar existential crises and contradictions as progressive rap. However, it typically avoids gangsta rap's documentarian qualities in favor of actively constructive and educational responses to issues afflicting society, particularly black people, resulting in narratives that promote their history, culture, political involvement, and intrinsic value. In Pinn's words, it "seeks to address these concerns without intracommunal aggression and in terms of political and cultural education, providing an interpretation of American society and a constructive agenda (e.g. self respect, knowledge, pride, and unity) for the uplift of Black America". He adds that works of the genre also utilize "a more overt dialogue with and interpretation of Black religiosity". In a corollary analysis, fellow scholar Evelyn L. Parker says that progressive rap "seeks to transform systems of injustice by transforming the perspective of their victims" while demonstrating "the clear prophetic voice reflecting the rage caused by the dehumanizing injustices that African Americans experience".

Progressive hip-hop has been noted for often overlapping with counterpart forms such as gangsta and status rap, as "rappers may display characteristics of more than one category on a particular album or during the course of their career", according to the CERCL Writing Collective. (Note: The Center for Engaged Research and Collaborative Learning (CERCL) is a rotating group of graduate students at Rice University who have written in collaboration with their founding director Anthony B. Pinn, including Breaking Bread, Breaking Beats (2014), a collection of essays examining the intersection of hip-hop culture and religion.) Within progressive traditions of hip-hop, clinical psychologist and documentarian Janice Haaken identifies subgenres like political hip-hop and homo hop. However, she notes that these have largely eluded mainstream culture because of the commercial dominance of gangsta rap and the precarious position rap music in general holds in the popular imagination of the West, which often stereotypes the music with vulgar associations of culturally marginalized youth rebellion. Noting its presence on the outside of the mainstream, Fort Worth Star-Telegram journalist Cary Darling writes that this form of hip-hop has been "alternately labeled 'progressive,' 'alternative,' 'underground' or 'conscious'", (Note: The CERCL Writing Collective also confirms "conscious rap" as being synonymous with progressive rap.) while essentializing them collectively as a return to the creative spirit of hip-hop's golden era:

It can include everything from jazz-like improvisation to rock-ish noise, from hard-edged politics to avant-gardist abstraction. What these artists have in common is moving beyond hip-hop's obsession with materialism and turf wars, and making good on its initial promise of experimentalism and adventure.

== Fashion ==
As with fashion in other hip-hop forms, individuals operating within progressive rap circles follow a distinct dress code that acts as a response to societal oppression. Like gangsta rap in particular, progressive and conscious rappers communicate ideas of protest against socioeconomic conditions through the use of anti-fashion, an aesthetic concept that involves styles of dress contrary to prevailing fashions. This includes donning Afrocentric clothing to represent the valorization of African cultural heritage.

== History ==
=== 1980s–1990s: Early developments ===
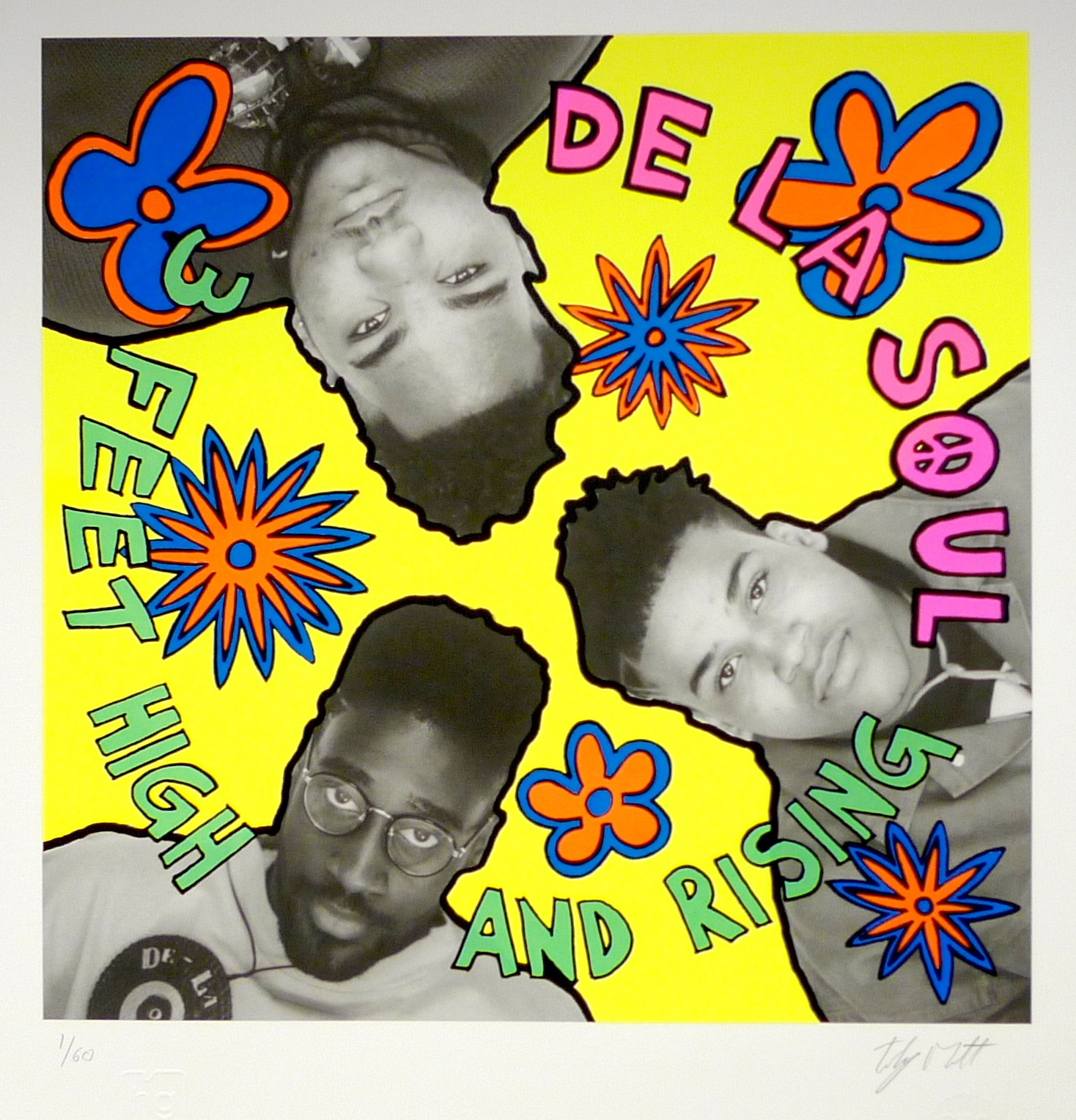
Cover print of De La Soul's 1989 album 3 Feet High and Rising

Grandmaster Flash and the Furious Five's 1982 song "The Message" and the music of Public Enemy are cited by both Pinn and Parker as formative examples of progressive rap. Parker specifically highlights "The Message" for how it communicates anger about chaotic urban life, particularly in the refrain: "Don't push me, 'cause I'm close to the edge / I'm tryin' not to lose my head / It's like a jungle sometimes, it makes me wonder how I keep from going under." In the late 1980s and early 1990s, political hip-hop emerged with an intellectual paradigm of Afrocentricity that shaped the element of discourse in progressive rap.

At the turn of the 1990s, groups such as De La Soul, A Tribe Called Quest, and Brand Nubian emerged with works that "defined the term progressive hip-hop", according to Greg Kot, who credits them with "setting the standards for thematic genius in the idiom". De La Soul in particular "taught rappers back in 1989 that you could make interesting and successful music without relying on venomous stares and snarling poses", as Cheo Hodari Coker writes. These groups were part of an acclaimed collective of progressive-rap acts known as the Native Tongues that also included Jungle Brothers, Monie Love, Queen Latifah, Black Sheep, Busta Rhymes, and Mos Def.

While highly successful with critics, the progressive rap music of this period failed to capture a sizable audience within hip-hop's traditionalist base of artists and fans, who gravitated more toward hardcore stylings in the genre. De La Soul's 1989 debut album 3 Feet High and Rising, with its mix of collected sounds ranging from soul to psychedelic music, received widespread acclaim and sold well outside of the rap market. But the group's success was soon overshadowed by the sudden rise of gangsta rap in the early 1990s. "De La Soul went from the front of the hip-hop pack to the back of an appealing and colorful dead-end street", as Chris Nickson recounts.

As hardcore and gangsta rap forms progressively dominated commercial hip-hop in the 1990s, groups such as A Tribe Called Quest, Beastie Boys, and the eclectic Afrocentric Arrested Development continued to offer a marketable alternative. A Tribe Called Quest's early-1990s albums The Low End Theory (1991) and Midnight Marauders (1993) were especially influential in their fusion of abstract lyrics with music samples based in jazz, inspiring subsequent works by Common, The Roots, and Fugees. Common achieved underground success with his 1994 single "I Used to Love H.E.R." and went on to join The Roots in a developing collective and online community known as Okayplayer, featuring like-minded progressive rap musicians who emphasized the "organic" elements of hip-hop. In 1996, Fugees gained mainstream recognition with their second album The Score and its supporting singles "Fu-Gee-La" and "Killing Me Softly". Seeking to restore a sense of musicality they believed had been lost among the Black underclass, the trio incorporated soulful melodies, harmonic refrains, and live instrumentation (bass, keyboard, drums, and guitar) that drew on reggae, doo-wop, and Latin influences, while performing tough-minded raps about socially conscious and urban realist ideas.

I was so stupid, fighting for a block that I didn't even own, getting shot at and being near a lot of my friends when they got killed. I got lucky, because God felt like that wasn't my true role. I'm not gonna rap about that, like a lot of other rappers do in the name of 'keeping it real.' If you went through Vietnam and have flashbacks, you don't always want to talk about that stuff. I just want to live, be happy and chill.

— Pras of the Fugees (1996)

The Fugees' individualistic style attracted a variety of audiences outside of the trio's hardcore fanbase while affiliating them with alternative hip-hop, a designation they hated for suggesting only a fringe appeal to their music. "If we were truly 'alternative,' brothers in the 'hood wouldn't be getting with our music", Fugees member Pras told the Los Angeles Times in 1996. "You got the Mobb Deep fans loving it and the Red Hot Chili Peppers fans loving it. ... That's mass appeal." Reporting on their impact for the Times, Coker said the trio occupy a unique space that avoids contemporary rap's pointless braggadocio, overused "P-Funk" samples, misogynistic attitudes, and luxury fantasies, while remaining distinct from "critically acclaimed but commercially cold [alternative] acts" such as Arrested Development, P.M. Dawn, and Digable Planets. "By redefining the creative center of hip-hop", Coker explained, "the trio is stepping out as the freshest and possibly most important progressive hip-hop act since De La Soul".

By the late 1990s, progressive rap acts like Black Star and Juggaknots were helping inspire and shape what would become the underground hip-hop subculture of the years that followed. The underground scene in New York's West Village in particular helped establish the careers of future solo progressive rappers such as Black Star members Mos Def and Talib Kweli, as well as Jean Grae, although as a female rapper she struggled to attract interest from record labels. Meanwhile, Fugees member Lauryn Hill had embarked on a solo career, duetting with Common on his single "Retrospect for Life" (1997) and releasing her hugely successful debut album The Miseducation of Lauryn Hill (1998). XXL magazine said at the time that the album not only reveals Hill to be "the most exciting voice of a young, progressive hip-hop nation, it raises the standards for it."

=== 2000s: Competing in the mainstream ===
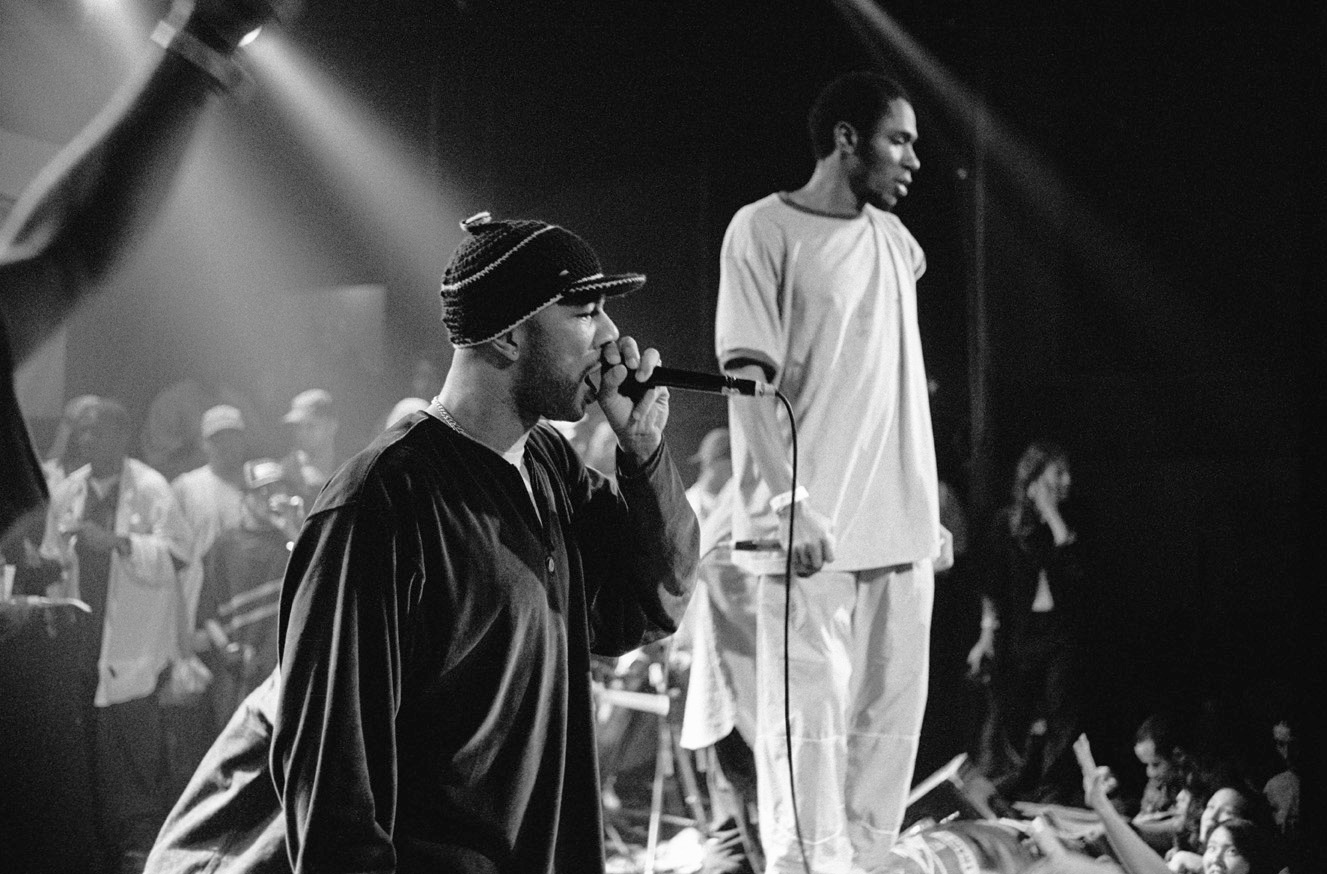
Common (left) and Mos Def in 1999

In the early 2000s, some progressive-rap acts achieved mainstream success with records that "ruminated on hip-hop's post-millennial direction" and that were produced "in an avant-garde vein purposely intended to evolve the [genre]", as Miles Marshall Lewis chronicles. In 2000, The Roots won a Grammy Award for their song "You Got Me" (1999), while Mos Def's acclaimed debut album Black on Both Sides (1999) received a Gold sales certification. Both acts were frequent collaborators with Common and appeared on his commercially successful Like Water for Chocolate (2000).

Drawing on influences from jazz, R&B, funk, and African music, Like Water for Chocolate was Common's attempt to "expand hip hop" and his "mind to different styles of music, to different approaches", as he explained to MTV News for an article published "Common Moves Toward a Progressive Hip-Hop". Inspired as well by the radical spoken-word group the Last Poets, he performed teasing and playfully boastful raps around themes of life, the music industry, cultural quirks, and relationships, with the latter explored through "The Light"'s advocacy for respecting women and denunciation of the word "bitch". Common said that he, Mos Def, and The Roots were among a movement of jazz-influenced progressive artists trying to compete commercially with more austerely produced mainstream rappers like Jay-Z and DMX, who had outsold them significantly up to that point. Interviewed for the same piece, Jungle Brothers rapper Afrika Baby Bam expressed support for the younger artists and believed they were close to accomplishing their goal.

They're not watering themselves down with the mainstream. They're strengthening their influence from within, and it's making people believe in what they're saying and what they're doing and look their way.

— Afrika Baby Bam of Jungle Brothers (2000)

Groups such as The Roots, Jurassic 5, and Dilated Peoples continued to release minor commercial breakthroughs during the first half of the decade. Among the most eclectic prog-rap successes from the early 2000s, in Lewis's opinion, were Outkast's Stankonia (2000) and The Roots' Phrenology (2002).

In 2003, Outkast released the experimental and eccentric double album Speakerboxxx/The Love Below, comprising one half of Big Boi's virtuosic progressive rap and another half of André 3000's musically wide-ranging and sung love songs. Avoiding tributes to crime or violence, Big Boi touched on themes of single-parent life, organized religion, post-9/11 infringement of civil liberties, prostitution, and social fashion, with raps set to austere techno beats, funk grooves, and multitracked soul vocals. The production's inventive vocal and rhythmic manipulation, unorthodox in-song stylistic changes, and oddly bawdy humor received comparisons to Parliament-Funkadelic and Mothers of Invention, along with more traditional 1970s R&B reference points in Sly Stone, Curtis Mayfield, and Marvin Gaye. Hailed by critics as the best album of 2003 and aided by the pop-soul hits "Hey Ya!" and "The Way You Move", the double album was a pivotal release in both rap and pop music, according to The Independent's Andy Gill, who predicted its standing "alongside the likes of 3 Feet High and Rising, It Takes a Nation of Millions to Hold Us Back and The Marshall Mathers LP – the kind of album that changes the game completely, that renders its competitors suddenly obsolete and old-hat."

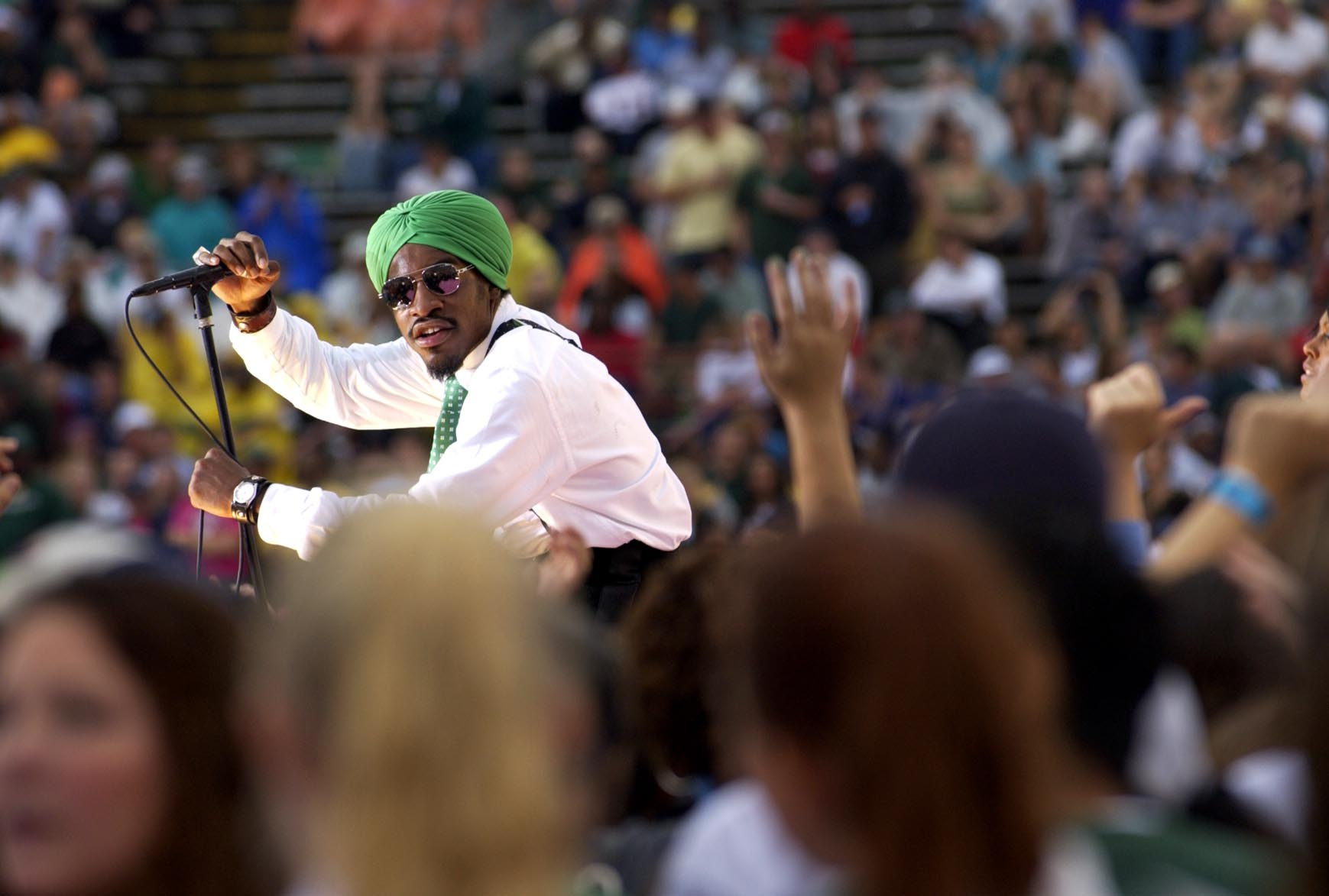
André 3000 of Outkast in 2003

Later in the decade, Common and fellow Chicago hip-hop artist Kanye West achieved further success with progressive rap records that explored contradictions in identity. Particularly in West's case, it often gave "expression to positive rage against systems that oppress communities" in a way that Parker compares to Arrested Development. On his debut album The College Dropout (2004), the rapper-producer infused pop music sensibilities into an otherwise "conscious or progressive hip-hop" which "melded intelligence and awareness with a stylish sense of cool that appealed to a broad range of fans", according to Darling, who also notes the contemporaneous success of the West-produced Common album Be (2005). Highsnobiety writer Shahzaib Hussain recognizes West's opening trilogy of education-themed albums, including Late Registration (2005) and Graduation (2007), as "a triumvirate of uber-successful records that cemented his role as a progressive rap progenitor".

As industry sales declined past the mid 2000s, and other rap stars resorted to pop collaborations for mainstream appeal, West remained a highly profitable yet experimental artist impacting both pop and hip-hop markets with progressive records like the Daft Punk-sampling "Stronger" (2007). His commercial success during this period encouraged more rappers to gravitate toward the center of mainstream and alternative hip-hop forms, "when this visionary megalomaniac was remaking the rap mainstream in his own image", as Stereogum's Chris Deville details. Toward the end of the 2000s, while suffering losses in his personal life, West began to alienate the pop-culture audience with notorious on-air incidents and a polarizing departure in the downbeat and Auto-Tune-processed sounds of 808s & Heartbreak (2008), although that album too proved commercially successful and influential on the stylistic direction of hip-hop.

=== 2010s–present: Varied directions ===
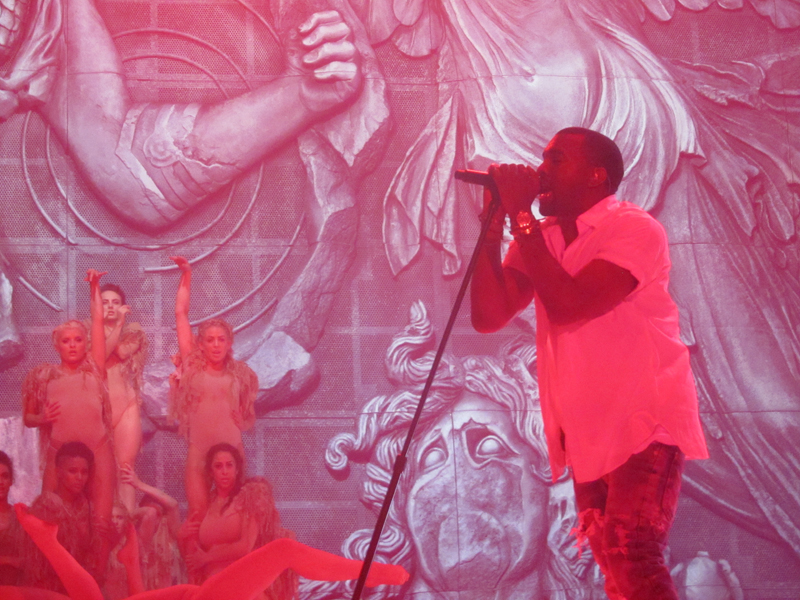
Kanye West performing in 2011

In 2010, West returned from an elaborate recording process with My Beautiful Dark Twisted Fantasy, which set the rapper's egocentric meditations on his fame against an instrumentally varied and layered maximalist production that utilized samples, rhythm tracks, keyboards, guitars, orchestral arrangements, and a host of additional vocalists. His use of samples from progressive rock records on songs such as "Power" in particular lent the album the "prog-rap" epithet, although Deville argues that the music as a whole "borrows more from prog's pageantry and bombast than its maze-like compositional structure". According to Robert Christgau, the album "rescued [West's] faltering music from his staggering celebrity" and articulated his "personality disorders far more subtly and satirically" than his next album Watch the Throne (2011), a top-selling collaboration with his former major-label recruiter Jay-Z that West produced in a "funkier and less ornate variant" of its predecessor's prog-rap.

While My Beautiful Dark Twisted Fantasy was widely acclaimed and publicly redeemed West, much of the rapper's musical work through the rest of the decade would prove inferior to fans and become progressively overshadowed by stories surrounding his celebrity family life, provocative public statements, mental health issues, and nonmusical ventures.

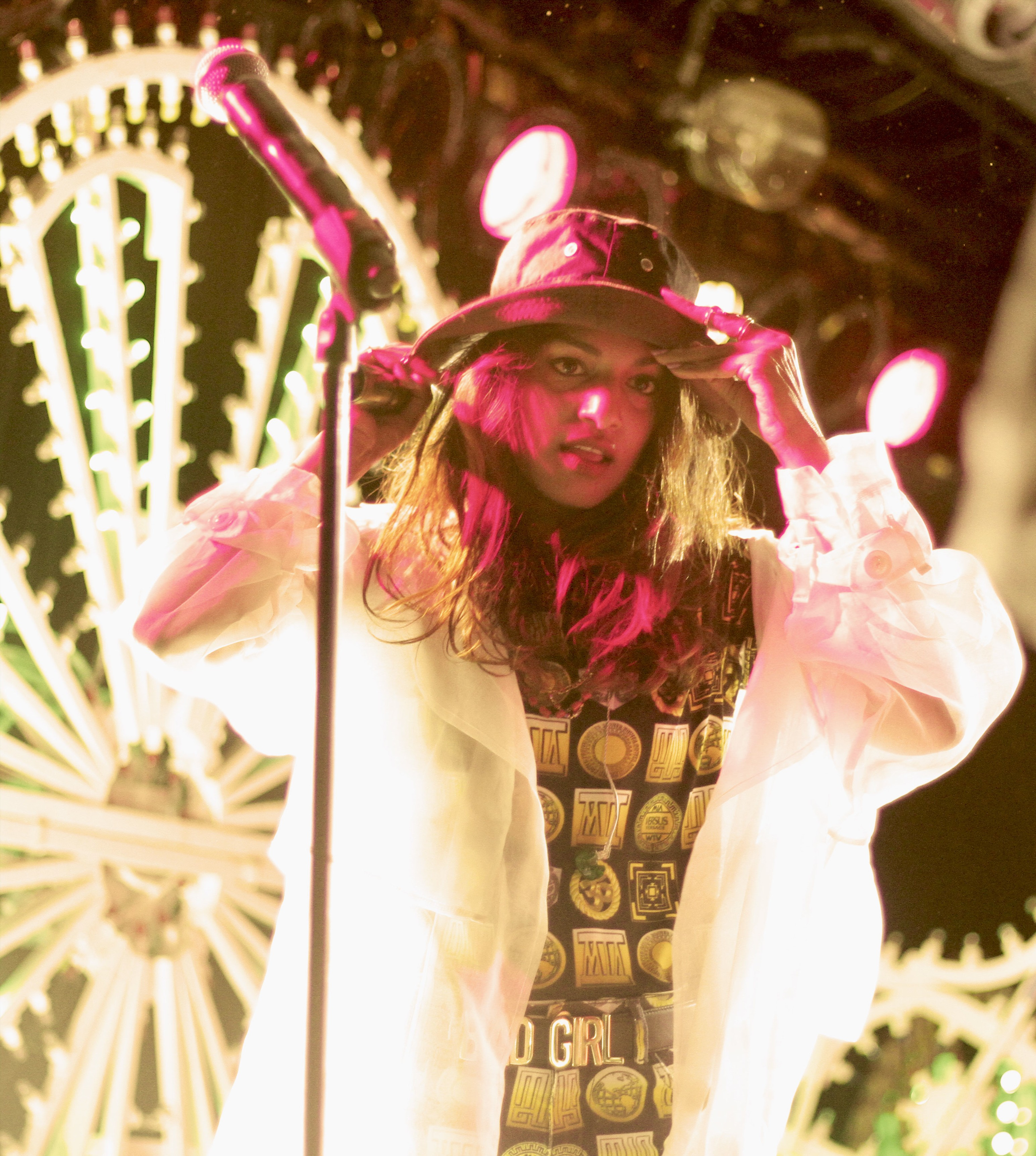
M.I.A. in 2014

During the 2010s, a progressive hip-hop and electronic music scene emerged along the US West Coast centering on musicians such as rapper Kendrick Lamar, producer-DJs Flying Lotus and the Gaslamp Killer, bassist Thundercat, and rap duo Shabazz Palaces. American studies and media scholar William Hoynes points to Lamar with his progressive rap music for being in a tradition of African-American artists and activists that have "worked both inside and outside of the mainstream to advance a counterculture that opposes the racist stereotypes being propagated in White-owned media and culture". Lamar's Los Angeles-based independent label Top Dawg Entertainment became known for producing album-oriented progressive rap, being home to fellow rappers Jay Rock, Ab-Soul, and Schoolboy Q. Mello Music Group, another independent label based in Tucson, has hosted a community of progressive-rap acts, including veteran artists Kool Keith, Pete Rock, and O.C., alongside younger musicians like Open Mike Eagle, Oddisee, Apollo Brown, and L'Orange.

In 2016, Vice journalist Mike Vinti reported on a development of progressive rap within the UK hip-hop scene. According to Vinti, it is being "driven by fresh minds like Gaika, Kojey Radical and Sub Luna City, who are working deliberately outside the confines of grime and traditional UK hip-hop to create genuinely progressive rap that rivals the US for creativity, urgency, and importance, and portrays a much broader Black British music landscape than you hear on the radio." While arguing that American hip-hop was in a creative and commercial decline, Marcus Dowling wrote contemporaneously that the English rapper M.I.A. remained a progressive-rap innovator for conceiving a globalized gaze of class- and gender inequality in a musical style that melds trap, contemporary dance, and deconstructed forms of rapping. "In the 21st century, it's entirely arguable that white is black, black is white, and things are obviously a bit difficult to understand", Dowling contended in regards to modern hip-hop. "It's up to a wild, diverse, hyper-intellectualized and new-age brown woman to lead us."

== See also ==
- Album era
- Conscious hip-hop
- Hip-hop and social injustice
- Jazz rap
- Political hip-hop
- Progressive soul
- Progressivism
- Radicalization
- Soulquarians
- Whiteness studies

== Bibliography ==
- CERCL Writing Collective (2014). Breaking Bread, Breaking Beats: Churches and Hip-Hop: A Basic Guide to Key Issues. Augsburg Fortress Publishers. ISBN 978-0800699260.
- Hill, Marc Lamont (2010). "Critical Pedagogy Comes at Halftime". In Dyson, Michael Eric; Daulatzai, Sohail (eds.). Born to Use Mics: Reading Nas's Illmatic. Basic Books. ISBN 978-0465002115.
- Nickson, Chris (2004). Hey Ya!: The Unauthorized Biography of Outkast. Macmillan. ISBN 0312337353.
