= The Light (Common song) =

Single by Common

from the album Like Water for Chocolate
- Released: July 18, 2000
- Genre: Hip-hop
- Length: 4:21
- Label: MCA
- Songwriters: Lonnie Lynn; James Yancey; Bobby Caldwell; Ramel Werner; Norman Harris; Bruce Malament
- Producer: Jay Dee

Common singles chronology
"Full Moon" (2000)	"The Light" (2000)	"Geto Heaven Remix T.S.O.I. (The Sound of Illadelph)" (2001)

Music video
- "The Light" on YouTube

Audio sample
- "The Light": file; help

"The Light" is the second single from Common's 2000 album Like Water for Chocolate. It was produced by Jay Dee and features keyboards performed by James Poyser. It samples "Open Your Eyes" as performed by Bobby Caldwell and the drums from "You're Gettin' a Little Too Smart" by the Detroit Emeralds. Framed as a love letter, it is a confession of Common's love for a woman – specifically, his girlfriend at the time, Erykah Badu (in 2012, Common acknowledged in a video for RapGenius that the song was about her).

"The Light" is Common's first single to chart on the Billboard Hot 100, where it peaked at No. 44.

In 2024, Common explained to Drink Champs that his "Digga-da, digga-da, digga-digga-da-da" ad lib was a placeholder. He wasn't able to find anything else to fill it and left it in.

== Chart performance ==
After the release of Like Water for Chocolate, the song almost immediately attained the status of one of hip-hop's few "precious" love songs and women's anthems. The song gave Common his best chart positions in the US. It peaked at No. 44 on the Billboard Hot 100, No. 21 on the Rhythmic Top 40 chart and No. 12 on the Hot R&B/Hip-Hop Singles & Tracks chart. Additionally, it reached No. 13 on the Hot Rap Singles chart, a feat that Common had previously surpassed.

== Reception ==
AllMusic writer Steve Huey said that "The Light" as well as "The 6th Sense" are "quintessential Common, uplifting and thoughtful [songs that] helped bring him a whole new audience."

Cynthia Fuchs of PopMatters described it as a "charming, tender, and undeniably soulful declaration of affection and respect." The music video (directed by Nzingha Stewart) features Common, Erykah Badu and "recognizable sensual delights" including "a homemade Minnie Riperton cassette, a mango, a pink lava lamp [and] a deeply green water-beaded leaf."

The song was listed at number 268 on Pitchfork's "Top 500 songs of the 2000s".

The song received a 2001 Grammy Award nomination for Best Rap Solo Performance.

== Alternate versions ==
- A live seven-minute version featuring vocals by Erykah Badu and Bilal, scratching by DJ Dummy, keyboards by James Poyser and Omar Edwards, bass guitar by Adam Blackstone, drums by Questlove, guitar by Kevin Hanson and percussion by Frank "Knuckles" Walker is featured on Dave Chappelle's Block Party 2006 soundtrack.
- A remix featuring vocals by Erykah Badu was released by Motown Records as a single in 2000 for the Bamboozled soundtrack.
- The original version is featured on compilations such as The Source Presents: Hip Hop Hits, Vol. 4 (2000), Grammy R&B/Rap Nominees 2001, Pure R&B Vol. 2, and Wrap It Up (all from 2001), The Hip Hop Box (2004) and Hip Hop: Gold (2006).
- "The Light '08 (It's Love)", a remake made by Common and producer Just Blaze, featuring Marsha Ambrosius, was released in 2008 for a Smirnoff advertising campaign.

== Track listings ==
"The Light" US version released on July 18, 2000.

=== US version ===
==== A-side ====
1. "The Light (Album Version)" (4:02)
2. "The Light (instrumental)" (4:07)
3. "The Light (Acappella)" (3:42)

==== B-side ====
1. "Funky for You (Album Version)" (4:28)
2. "Funky for You (instrumental)" (4:26)
3. "Funky for You (radio edit)" (4:28)

=== Import ===
"The Light" import released on March 3, 2000

==== A-side ====
1. "The Light (Album Version)"

==== B-side ====
1. "The 6th Sense (Something U Feel) (Album Version)"
2. "The Light (instrumental)"

=== Remix ===
"The Light" remix released on October 31, 2000

==== A-side ====
1. "The Light (remix) (radio)" (4:01)
2. "The Light (remix) (Main)" (6:03)

==== B-side ====
1. "The Light (remix) (instrumental)" (5:49)
2. "The Light (remix) (Acapella)" (5:56)

== Charts ==
=== Weekly charts ===
Chart (2000)	Peak position
UK Singles (Official Charts)	56
UK Hip Hop/R&B (Official Charts)	6
US Billboard Hot 100	44
US Hot R&B/Hip-Hop Songs (Billboard)	12
US Hot Rap Songs (Billboard)	13
US Rhythmic Airplay (Billboard)	21

=== Year-end charts ===
Chart (2000)	Position
UK Urban (Music Week)	39
US Hot R&B/Hip-Hop Songs (Billboard)	40

== See also ==
- Progressive rap
