= Geto Heaven Remix T.S.O.I. (The Sound of Illadelph) =

2001 single by Common and Macy Gray

Single by Common featuring Macy Gray

from the album Like Water for Chocolate (alternate edition)
- Released: April 16, 2001
- Recorded: Electric Lady Studios (New York City, New York)
- Genre: Hip-hop
- Length: 5:18
- Label: MCA
- Songwriters: Lonnie Lynn, Ahmir Thompson, James Poyser
- Producer: Soulquarians

Common singles chronology
"The Light" (2000)	"Geto Heaven Remix T.S.O.I. (The Sound of Illadelph)" (2001)	"In the Sun" (2001)

Macy Gray singles chronology
"Demons" (2001)	"Geto Heaven Remix T.S.O.I. (The Sound of Illadelph)" (2001)	"Request + Line" (2001)

"Geto Heaven Remix T.S.O.I. (The Sound of Illadelph)" is the third single from rapper Common's 2000 album Like Water for Chocolate. It features Macy Gray and was produced by Questlove and James Poyser, both of whom are members of the Soulquarians. Its title is a reference to MFSB's 1974 "TSOP (The Sound of Philadelphia)"; it contains positive lyrics that are pro-woman and slightly religious. It is featured on the alternate release of Like Water for Chocolate, but on the original pressing, a song named "Geto Heaven Part 2" is found instead. "Geto Heaven Part 2" features D'Angelo and was originally intended to be on the latter's 2000 album Voodoo. The remix reached number sixty-one on the Hot R&B/Hip-Hop Songs chart. A music video directed by Nzingha Stewart was made for the remix.

== Track listings and formats ==
CD single

1. "Geto Heaven Remix T.S.O.I. (The Sound of Illadelph)" (Radio Edit)
2. "Geto Heaven Remix T.S.O.I. (The Sound of Illadelph)" (Extended Mix)
3. "Geto Heaven Remix T.S.O.I. (The Sound of Illadelph)" (Brooklyn Funk Remix)
4. "Geto Heaven Remix T.S.O.I. (The Sound of Illadelph)" (Video)

12" single

- Side A:
1. "Geto Heaven Remix T.S.O.I. (The Sound of Illadelph)" (Extended Radio Edit) – 4:21
2. "Geto Heaven Remix T.S.O.I. (The Sound of Illadelph)" (Radio Edit) – 4:02
- Side B:
1. "Geto Heaven Remix T.S.O.I. (The Sound of Illadelph)" (Instrumental) – 5:24
2. "Geto Heaven Remix T.S.O.I. (The Sound of Illadelph)" (Acappella) – 5:26

== Charts ==
Chart (2001)	Peak position
UK Singles Chart	48
UK R&B Singles Chart	11
U.S. Billboard Hot R&B/Hip-Hop Songs	61

== See also ==
- List of Common songs
