= The 6th Sense =

Single by Common featuring Bilal

from the album Like Water for Chocolate
- B-side: "Dooinit"
- Released: February 15, 2000
- Recorded: 1999 D&D Studios, New York City, New York
- Genre: Hip-hop
- Length: 5:19
- Label: MCA
- Songwriters: Lonnie Lynn; Bilal Oliver; Chris Martin; Kejuan Muchita; Albert Johnson
- Producer: DJ Premier

Common singles chronology
"Hurricane" (1999)	"The 6th Sense" (2000)	"Full Moon" (2000)

Music video
- "The 6th Sense" on YouTube

"The 6th Sense" is the first single from Common's 2000 album Like Water for Chocolate. It was produced by DJ Premier, making it the only song on Common's 2000 album not produced by a member of the Soulquarians. It features Premier's trademark chorus with scratched samples; the samples are from "Memories Are Here to Stay" by the Intruders and "Allustrious" by Mobb Deep. The chorus also features singing by neo-soul artist Bilal. The song's lyrics discuss afrocentricity, hip-hop culture and various social issues. "The 6th Sense" begins with an introduction in which Common states "the revolution will not be televised, the revolution is here" referencing the famous Gil-Scott Heron song named "The Revolution Will Not Be Televised". "The 6th Sense" was also a B-side of the following single, "The Light".

The song reached No. 87 on the Hot R&B/Hip-Hop Singles & Tracks chart and No. 14 on the Hot Rap Singles chart.

A music video directed by Andrew Dosunmu was made for "The 6th Sense". The video features Common rapping in a stationary car alongside Bilal, while chaos ensues outside of the car.

== Critical reception ==
"The 6th Sense" received positive recognition from multiple sources: Mark Anthony Neal of PopMatters considered it to be a classic song and Common's best single besides "I Used to Love H.E.R." AllMusic writer Steve Huey considered "The 6th Sense" as well as "The Light" as "quintessential Common, uplifting and thoughtful [songs that] helped bring him a whole new audience." Rashaun Hall of BarnesandNoble.com said that "[t]he freestyle-sounding lead single [...] showcases Common's fluid flow backed by a dense, DJ Premier beat that knocks harder than the NYPD." Pitchfork writer Taylor Clark declared that on "The 6th Sense", "Common gets iller than syphilis over an addictive track supplied by Gang Starr's DJ Premier."

There is a popular remix of the song produced by 9th Wonder, which utilizes the same scratches by DJ Premier, and was shared on many P2P networks as a free download. The remix was also featured on some of 9th Wonder's remix compilations.

== Track listing ==
=== A-side ===
1. "The 6th Sense (Album Version)"
2. "The 6th Sense (instrumental)"
3. "The 6th Sense (Acapella)"

=== B-side ===
1. "Dooinit (Album Version)"
2. "Dooinit (instrumental)"

== Chart positions ==
Chart (2000)	Peak position
U.S. Billboard Hot R&B/Hip-Hop Songs	87
U.S. Billboard Hot Rap Tracks	14
UK Singles Chart	56

== See also ==
- List of Common songs
