= Chain (The Family Stand album) =

Studio album by the Family Stand
- Released: 1990
- Genre: R&B, rock
- Label: Atlantic
- Producer: Jeffrey Smith, Peter Lord

The Family Stand chronology
Chapters: A Novel by Evon Geffries and the Stand (1987)	Chain (1990)	Moon in Scorpio (1991)

Chain is an album by the American band the Family Stand, released in the United States in 1990. The first single, "Ghetto Heaven", was a hit in dance clubs; "Chain" was also released as a single. The band supported the album with a North American tour. Chain peaked at No. 52 on the UK Albums Chart.

== Production ==
The Family Stand hoped to craft a nonmainstream album that would still be played on Black radio; according to the band, Atlantic Records delayed Chain due to doubts about radio success. Their chief influence was Sly and the Family Stone. Sandra St. Victor sang lead on "In Summer I Fall". "Little White, Little Black Lies" examines racism in Christianity. The rap in "Twisted" implores the Jackson family to avoid additional plastic surgery; the track includes a snippet of a Malcolm X speech. The title track urges listeners to avert the bad habits of their parents. "Ovasaxed" is a saxophone-led instrumental.

== Critical reception ==
Professional ratings
Review scores
Source	Rating
AllMusic	3/5 stars
The Kansas City Star	3/4 stars
The Rolling Stone Album Guide	3/5 stars

The Toronto Star called the album "a virtually seamless blend of vintage soul, hip-hop, modern rhythm 'n' blues and rock, decorated around the edges with jazzy frills." USA Today deemed it "in-depth music that moves the mind as well as the butt." The Los Angeles Times opined that St. Victor "displays a dynamic and impressive range." The Star Tribune concluded that "the quirky 'Twisted' is the gem here... It's a 1990 answer to Prince's socially conscious 'Sign o' the Times'." The Chicago Tribune considered Chain to be "one of the great lost albums of 1990."

AllMusic determined that "the title track ... is melodic in a muddy way, the muffled sound gives the shuffling rhythm an eerie effect."

== Track listing ==
No.	Title	Length
1.	"Ghetto Heaven (Remix)"
2.	"Twisted"
3.	"Only"
4.	"In Summer I Fall"
5.	"Ovasaxed"
6.	"Sweet Liberation"
7.	"The Last Temptation"
8.	"Chain"
9.	"Avenue Lust"
10.	"Little White, Little Black Lies"
11.	"Ghetto Heaven"
