= New World Order (album) =

Studio album by Curtis Mayfield
- Released: October 1, 1996
- Recorded: February–June 1996
- Genres: Soul, R&B
- Length: 63:01
- Label: Warner Bros.
- Producers: Curtis Mayfield, Brian Fleming, Carlos Glover, Narada Michael Walden, James Fischer, Erik "E-Smooth" Hicks, Organized Noize, Daryl Simmons, Arnold Hennings

Curtis Mayfield chronology
Take It to the Streets (1990)	New World Order (1996)

New World Order is R&B/soul singer-songwriter Curtis Mayfield's final studio album. The album reached No. 24 on the US Billboard Top R&B/Hip-Hop Albums chart, and No. 44 on the UK Albums chart.

== Critical reception ==
Professional ratings
Review scores
Source	Rating
AllMusic	3/5 stars
The Independent	(favourable)
Muzik	10/10
NME	7/10
The New York Times	(favourable)
Rolling Stone	4/5 stars
Vibe	(favourable)

New World Order was the only Curtis Mayfield album written, recorded and released after a life-changing accident in August 1990 left him paralyzed from the neck down. Mayfield continued to compose and sing, and his vocals were recorded, usually line-by-line, while he was lying on his back.

AllMusic described the album as "a touching, moving comeback". Rolling Stone called the LP "a triumphant return". NME said that the album was inconsistent but that "when it peaks, you'll believe that one man's voice can heal the gravest wounds."

New World Order was Grammy nominated for "Best R&B Album". Both the album's title track and the song "Back to Living Again" were also Grammy nominated for "Best Male R&B Vocal Performance".

== Singles ==
"New World Order" got to No. 14 on the Billboard Adult R&B Songs chart. "No One Knows About a Good Thing (You Don't Have to Cry)" also rose to No. 21 on the Billboard Adult R&B Songs chart.

== Track listing ==
No.	Title	Length
1.	"New World Order"	5:36
2.	"Ms. Martha"	4:21
3.	"Back to Living Again"	5:11
4.	"No One Knows About a Good Thing (You Don't Have to Cry)"	5:19
5.	"Just a Little Bit of Love" (featuring Blaise Mayfield and Lisa Coates)	5:27
6.	"We People Who are Darker than Blue" (featuring Roger Troutman)	5:02
7.	"I Believe in You" (duet with Sandra St. Victor)	4:58
8.	"Here But I'm Gone"	5:18
9.	"It Was Love That We Needed"	4:14
10.	"The Got Dang Song"	5:17
11.	"The Girl I Find Stays On My Mind"	3:58
12.	"Let's Not Forget"	3:42
13.	"Oh So Beautiful" (featuring Erik "E Smooth" Hicks)	4:38

== Personnel ==
- Curtis Mayfield – vocals
- Craig Love, Carlos Glover, Gary Thompson, Tomi Martin, Martin Terry – guitar
- Charles Pettaway, Preston Crump, Ralphe Armstrong, Ralph Stacey, George Grier, Lebrian Scott – bass
- Mavis Staples
- Aretha Franklin
- Erik "E Smooth" Hicks – writer, producer, vocals, keyboards, drum programming

== Charts ==
=== Weekly charts ===
Chart (1996–1997)	Peak position
Swedish Albums (Sverigetopplistan)	46
UK Albums (Official Charts)	44
UK R&B Albums (Official Charts)	7
US Billboard 200	137
US Top R&B/Hip-Hop Albums (Billboard)	24

=== Year-end charts ===
Chart (1997)	Position
US Top R&B/Hip-Hop Albums (Billboard)	83
