= Ghetto Heaven =

Single by The Family Stand

from the album Chain
- B-side: "Remix"
- Released: 1990
- Genre: Hip hop; dance; funk; R&B
- Length: 3:56 (original); 4:50 (remix)
- Label: Atlantic Records
- Songwriters: Peter Lord; Sandra St. Victor; V. Jeffrey Smith
- Producer: Peter Lord

The Family Stand singles chronology
"Ghetto Heaven" (1990)	"In Summer I Fall" (1990)

Music video
- "Ghetto Heaven" on YouTube

"Ghetto Heaven" is a song by American soul and R&B group the Family Stand, released in 1990 by Atlantic Records as the group's debut single, from their second album, Chain (1989). The song features vocals by lead-singer Sandra St. Victor, who also co-wrote it, and was an international hit, peaking at number ten in the UK in April 1990. Eight years later, in January 1998, the song again charted on the UK Singles Chart, peaking at number 30. Additionally, it was a top-10 hit in Luxembourg and a top-20 hit in New Zealand. Its accompanying music video featured the group performing in an urban city setting. American band Lisa Lisa and Cult Jam sampled "Ghetto Heaven" on their 1991 hit "Let the Beat Hit 'Em".

== Chart performance ==
"Ghetto Heaven" charted in several countries, in both Europe and Oceania. In Luxembourg, it peaked at number nine in its second week on the Radio Luxembourg singles chart in April 1990, after debuting at number 19. It then dropped to number 15, 17, 16, 14 and 16. In the Netherlands, it reached number 23 on Dutch Top 40, while reaching number 22 on the Single Top 100. In New Zealand, the song charted for eight weeks at the Recorded Music NZ singles chart, peaking at number 20 in its first week, on July 1, 1990.

In the UK, "Ghetto Heaven" debuted at number 24 on the UK Singles Chart on March 25. It climbed to number 13, staying there for two weeks, then climbing to number 12, before peaking at number ten on April 22. It stayed at that position for two weeks, before dropping to number 12, 17, 19, 37 and 57. On the Eurochart Hot 100, the single reached its highest position as number 24 on May 12, 1990.

== Critical reception ==
Andrew Hamilton from AllMusic commented, "The much ballyhooed 'Ghetto Heaven' attempts to capture the power of Marvin Gaye and Curtis Mayfield in social significancy but has the impact of a mosquitoe." Bill Coleman from Billboard magazine stated, "This multitalented outfit stands to win on its own terms this time out with an aggressively funky R&B track of considerable merit." He also named it "brilliant", and "music with a message" with a groove enhanced by mixes by Jazzie B & Nellee Hooper of Soul II Soul. Greg Sandow from Entertainment Weekly viewed it as "a look at how people use love, liquor, and religion to escape the troubles of life".

A reviewer from Music & Media wrote, "A hip-hop number with a classic soul vocal. Soul II Soul meets early 70s Tamla Motown with a hint of Chaka Khan. Highly recommended." British magazine Music Week ranked the song number five in their Top 10 list 'Pick of the Year - Dance'. Music Week editor Andy Beevers wrote, "As far as lyrics go, 'Ghetto Heaven' [...] is the strongest record to hit the dancefloor and the chart, since Prince's 'Sign o' the Times'. It is an eloquent portrayal of people temporarily escaping the drudgery of ghetto life through love, religion, drink and drugs." Carol Irving from Smash Hits complimented it as "a brooding, deeply groovy work of genius" and "so brilliant". Frank Owen from Spin described "Ghetto Heaven" as "Soul II Soul/'Funky Drummer'-ish". Mitch Potter from Toronto Star remarked the "percolating funk" of the song, "a portrait of oppressive street life that describes three escape routes (drugs, love, religion)".

== Track listing ==
"I know when I do it, and I think I probably perform it the most, I always have to flip the song to keep it fresh. I have to find a way to make it feel fresh to me. When I hear the original, or the remix that became the hit, it feels timeless to a certain degree but in my head, I still hear people saying, "That was Soul II Soul, right?" No! It was the Family Stand so I don't want to be reminded. I try to flip it and make it feel more us. Lyrically-speaking, and the melody, I still think it's a great song."

— Sandra St. Victor talking to PopMatters about the song.
- 7" single, UK
1. "Ghetto Heaven" (Remix Edit)
2. "Ghetto Heaven" (Original Version)
- 12" single, Europe
1. "Ghetto Heaven" (Remix) — 4:55
2. "Ghetto Heaven" (Original Version) — 4:00
3. "Ghetto Heaven" (Original Version) — 4:51
- CD maxi, Europe
1. "Ghetto Heaven" (The Remix) — 4:50
2. "Ghetto Heaven" (The Dub) — 4:50
3. "Ghetto Heaven" (The Original) — 3:56

== Charts ==
=== Weekly charts ===
Chart (1990)	Peak position
Europe (Eurochart Hot 100)	24
Israel (Israeli Singles Chart)	11
Luxembourg (Radio Luxembourg)	9
Netherlands (Dutch Top 40)	23
Netherlands (Single Top 100)	22
New Zealand (Recorded Music NZ)	20
UK Singles (OCC)	10
UK Dance (Music Week)	2
UK Club Chart (Record Mirror)	1

Chart (1998)	Peak position
Scotland (OCC)	43
UK Singles (OCC)	30
UK Dance (OCC)	5
UK Hip Hop/R&B (OCC)	6

=== Year-end charts ===
Chart (1990)	Position
UK Club Chart (Record Mirror)	1
