= Shawn Ginwright =

- Occupations: Author, University Professor
- Writing career
- Subjects: Multicultural education, Critical theory, Youth activism

Shawn A. Ginwright is an American author and professor. He is the Jerome T. Murphy professor of practice at Harvard Graduate School of Education. He is a former professor of Africana Studies at San Francisco State University. His research examines the ways in which youth in urban communities navigate through the constraints of poverty and struggle to create equality and justice in their schools. Ginwright has also been noted for his studies in hip hop academics.

== Career ==
Ginwright earned his Doctorate of Philosophy in Education at the University of California at Berkeley in 1999. He completed his Master of Arts in Communication at San Diego State University in 1992, and he earned his Bachelor of Arts in Speech Communication at San Diego State University in 1989.

Ginwright is formerly the co-founder and CEO of Flourish Agenda. He was the co-founder of Leadership Excellence Inc., a non-profit organization for urban communities located in downtown Oakland, California.

Ginwright has also been openly critical of Oprah Winfrey and Bill Cosby for their comments that "further demonstrate class warfare taking place within the Black community".

== Bibliography ==
- The Four Pivots: Reimagining Justice, Reimagining Ourselves. North Atlantic Books. (2022)
- Hope and Healing in Urban Education: How Urban Activists and Teachers are Reclaiming Matters of the Heart. Routledge. (2015).
- Black Youth Rising: Activism and Radical Healing in Urban America. Critical Youth Studies. Teachers College Press. (2010).
- Beyond Resistance! Youth Activism and Community Change: New Democratic Possibilities for Practice and Policy for America's Youth. Critical Youth Studies. Routledge. (2006) with Noguera, P. and Cammarota, J.
- "Toward a Politics of Relevance: Race, Resistance and African American Youth Activism." SSRC. (2006)
- Black In School: Afrocentric Reform, Urban Youth and the Promise of Hip-Hop Culture. Teachers College Press. (2004)
- Youth Organizing: Expanding Possibilities for Youth Development. Funder's Collaborative on Youth Organizing: Occasional Papers Series. (2003)
- with Cammarota. "New Terrain in Youth Development: The Promise of a Social Justice Approach," Social Justice., 29(4). (2002)
- "Classed Out: The Challenges of Social Class in Black Community Change," Social Problems, 49(4), 544-562. (2002)
- "From Assets to Agents: Social Justice, Organizing and Youth Development," New Directions in Youth Development. 96, Winter. (2002)
- "Critical Resistance: American Racism and African American Youth," Youth Development Journal, August 2001. Issue 3. (2001)
- "Identity For Sale; The use of racial and cultural identity in urban school reform," Urban Review. (32), 87-104. (1999)
- Identity For Sale: The Afrocentric Movement and the Black Urban Struggle in Oakland Public Schools. Dissertation, University of California Berkeley. (1999)
- Perceived Intercultural Training Effectiveness in the Workplace, Thesis, San Diego State University. (1992)
