= Sandra St. Victor =

American singer-songwriter

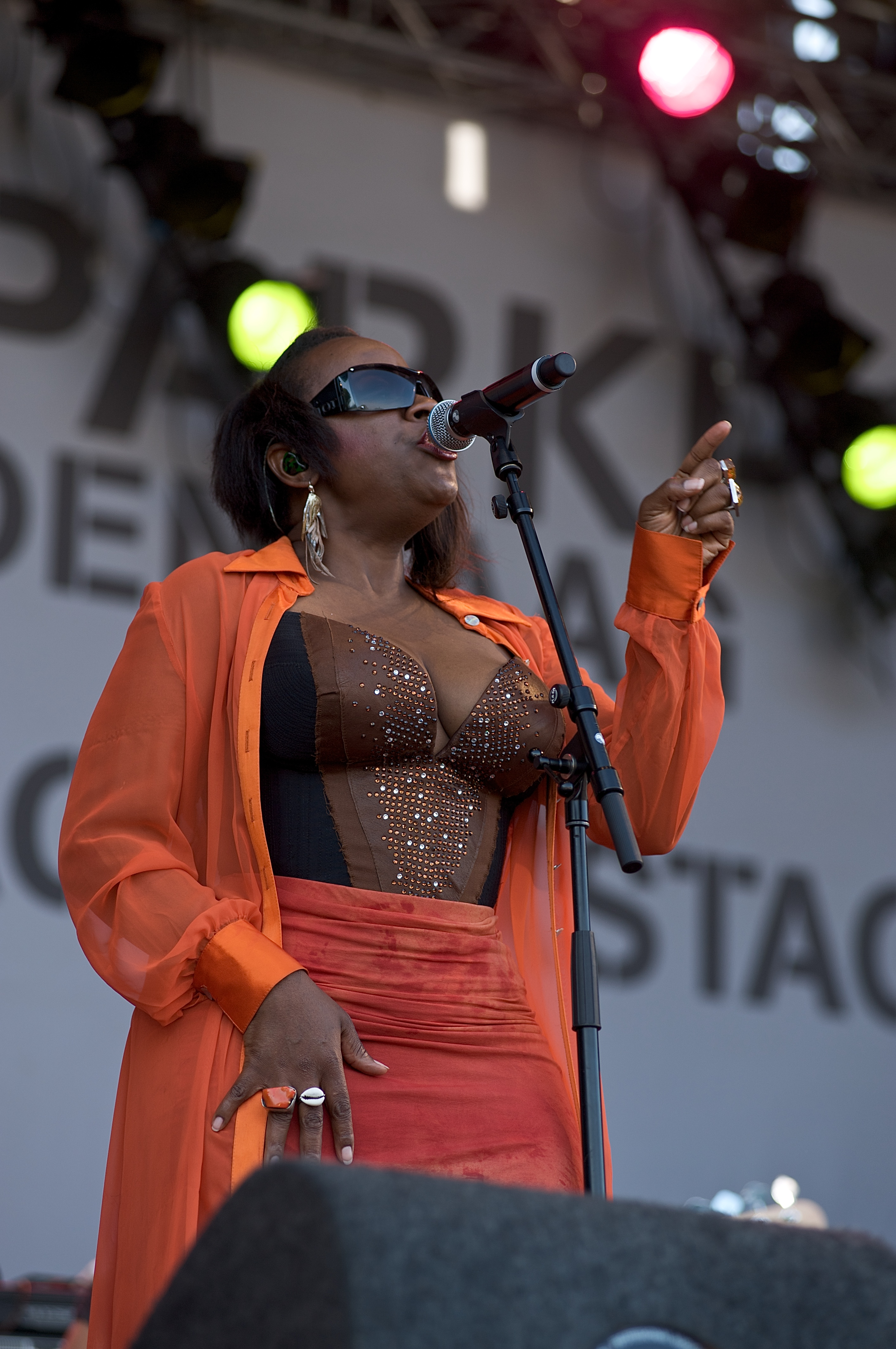

Background information
- Born: Sandra Kay Matthews; May 28, 1963 (age 63)
- Origin: Dallas, Texas, U.S.
- Genres: R&B, soul, jazz
- Occupations: Singer-songwriter, record producer, arranger, pianist
- Instruments: Piano, clarinet, vocals
- Years active: 1980–present
- Labels: Atlantic; East West; Elektra; Warner Bros.; Shanachie
- Formerly of: The Family Stand, Daughters of Soul
- Website: www.sandrastvictor.com

Sandra Kay Matthews, known professionally as Sandra St. Victor, is an American singer-songwriter most known for her work as lead singer of the Family Stand and their international hit single "Ghetto Heaven". She attended Booker T. Washington High School for the Performing and Visual Arts, (Arts Magnet) High School studying all styles of music. She received scholarships in music to Kansas University and Bishop College in Dallas, Texas, where she continued her studies, until dropping out. She joined a local band in Dallas, and began touring Texas and Louisiana. The band was led by jazz guitarist Zachary Breaux.

== Career ==
St. Victor moved to New York in the early 1980s on the offer of Roy Ayers to join his touring band Ubiquity. After seeing her sing with Ayers at the upper west side's Mikell's, Chaka Khan asked St. Victor to join her touring outfit, and help her find and audition the new background singer unit.

St. Victor toured with Khan throughout the 1980s as well as Freddie Jackson and Glenn Jones. Alongside touring, she made her name on the session circuit honing her chops with some of New York's finest voices, such as Lisa Fischer, Cindy Mizelle, Audrey Wheeler, Brenda White King, Tawatha Agee and Curtis King. In 1986, St. Victor was introduced to Peter Lord and Jeffrey Smith via Lisa Fischer at a Luther Vandross concert in Dallas, Texas, where she was visiting family. St. Victor had met Fischer years before in Houston, Texas, before she moved to New York. Fischer was on tour with the Crystals at the time. Lord and Smith were known R&B producers and needed someone to sing their demos. St. Victor fit the bill. She and the boys hit it off right away. Their three distinct musical backgrounds, classical, soul, pop, rock, jazz, melded together in the studio creating something exciting enough for them to want to record as a team. Hence the beginning of The Family Stand.

St. Victor began her solo career in 1993 signing to Elektra Records and recording the never-released Sanctuary. Although never released as a St. Victor work, the album has had several songs used by other artists, including the title track "Sanctuary", words used by Prince on his Emancipation CD, retitled and set to his own music as "Soul Sanctuary". "I'll Never Open My Legs Again" was used by Chaka Khan on her Come 2 My House CD retitled "I'll Never B Another Fool", "Whatever You Want" was used by Tina Turner, and "Love Is" was also used by Prince for an unreleased band under his production. The song was renamed "Van Gogh". Serbian band Van Gogh also covered the song. St. Victor's original work languishes still today on the record company's shelf.

In 1996, Warner Brothers released St. Victor's Mack Diva Saves the World, a more solid radio effort than her Family Stand work, critically acclaimed as well, but still no radio support. Around this time, she was featured on legend Curtis Mayfield's final album New World Order recording a duet with him called "I Believe in You". Going independent in 2001, Gemini: Both Sides was released via Expansion in the UK, and JVC in Asia, becoming an underground favorite amongst connoisseurs.

During the Family Stand years, St. Victor also wrote for Paula Abdul, with bandmates Peter Lord and V. Jeffrey Smith. Later, St. Victor discovered R&B group Profyle from Shreveport, LA and got them signed to Motown Records. Her song, "Lady" by Profyle, co-written with Tom Hammer, was covered by the Temptations, and nominated for a Grammy Award in 2003. She co-wrote 3 songs on stand-alone vocalist Lalah Hathaway's CD Self Portrait, released in 2009, with one of the songs, "That Was Then", being nominated for a Grammy Award.

=== 2010s–present ===
Moving to Europe in the early part of the decade, St. Victor formed a touring unit called Daughters of Soul. This 2-hour show featured Nona Hendryx of LaBelle, Joyce Kennedy of Mother's Finest, Deniece Williams, Caron Wheeler of Soul II Soul, Lalah Hathaway (daughter of Donny Hathaway), Indira Khan (daughter of Chaka Khan), Simone (daughter of Nina Simone), and Leah McCrae (daughter of George and Gwen McCrae). Daughters of Soul toured the festival circuit doing Nice Jazz, Pori Jazz, Java Jazz in Jakarta, among others. St. Victor also rejoined Chaka Khan on tour in Europe, and toured with Leon Ware doing Montreux Jazz, Vienna Jazz, and North Sea Jazz in the Netherlands.

In 2010, SSV's Sinner Child experimented in different ways, with several genres. The plan was to release mini EPs, dance, blues, soul, rock, piano and voice with the group. The first EP, at my spheres was produced by underground beatmaster Mark De Clive-Lowe. 2013 saw the release of Oya's Daughter, St. Victor's first full-length release since Gemini: Both Sides (2001). The album, produced by Mark De Clive-Lowe was released on Shanachie Entertainment internationally. After a mini hiatus to restart her Daughters of Soul project, St. Victor returned to the studio with producer Mark Batson to work on new music.

St. Victor's next album Eleven was released September 18, 2026 on vinyl-focused independent label Mother Tongue Records featuring guest appearances from Lalah Hathaway, Mocean Worker, Mark de Clive-Lowe, and others.

She moved to the Netherlands where she lives with her husband and 2 daughters Irisa and Naima; she has an older daughter in the United States named Maanami.

== Discography ==
- Mack Diva Saves the World (1996), Warner Bros.
- Gemini: Both Sides (2001), Expansion
- Oya's Daughter (2013), Shanachie
- Sanctuary (2018), independent self-release
- Eleven (2026), Mother Tongue
