= The Family Stand =

American soul and R&B group

- Origin: United States
- Genres: Soul, R&B
- Years active: 1987–present
- Labels: Atlantic; East West
- Members: Sandra St. Victor; Peter Lord Moreland; Vernon Jeffrey Smith
- Past members: Jacci McGhee
- Website: www.thefamilystand.net

The Family Stand is an American soul and R&B group based in New York City, active since the late 1980s, consisting of Sandra St. Victor, Peter Lord Moreland, and Vernon Jeffrey Smith.

== Early career ==
Chain brought them their international hit "Ghetto Heaven", which was remixed by Nellee Hooper & Jazzy B of Soul II Soul in 1990. The group's single "Ghetto Heaven" also reached #10 in the UK Singles Chart in April 1990. At the same time The Family Stand members were largely responsible for creating the songs on Paula Abdul's album Spellbound.

Moon in Scorpio, the album that became their swan song, was released in 1991. Lord labeled the album The Family Stand's "greatest artistic achievement."

== Connected ==
After discussion between the three, and disappointment with the lack of record company support, the group decided not to record again for the label. Lead vocalist St. Victor began to launch her solo career, and was replaced with Keith Sweat's former background vocalist Jacci McGhee in 1995. The reformed group came out with Connected.

== 2000s ==
The original trio reunited in 2006 for a concert at New York City Central Park's Summerstage, which inspired a reunion tour and new album, 2007's Super Sol Nova. Their latest release in 2010 was a single, "Story", chronicling the madness of the American justice system where an innocent boy can easily be lost. The follow-up full length project is entitled, In A Thousand Years.

In 2011, The Family Stand member V. Jeffrey Smith played bass on the song "Black Hand Side" on rapper Pharoahe Monch's 2011 album W.A.R. (We Are Renegades).

In 2013, The Family Stand contributed a track to a benefit album to raise funds for Donovan Drayton's release from prison.

== Discography ==
=== Albums ===
| Year | Album | Label |
|---|---|---|
| 1987 | Chapters: A Novel by Evon Geffries and the Stand | Atlantic Records |
| 1990 | Chain | Atlantic Records |
| 1991 | Moon in Scorpio | East West America/Atlantic Records |
| 1997 | Connected | East West America/Atlantic Records |
| 2007 | Super Sol Nova | Rounder Europe/Go! Entertainment |
| 2010 | In A 1,000 Years | Digital-only release via Bandcamp |

=== Singles ===
| Year | Title | Artist | Label |
|---|---|---|---|
| 1988 | "Sex W/O Love" | Evon Geffries & The Stand | Atlantic Records |
| 1988 | "Why Does It Hurt When We Kiss?" | Evon Geffries & The Stand | Atlantic Records |
| 1990 | "Ghetto Heaven" | The Family Stand | Atlantic Records |
| 1990 | "In Summer I Fall" | The Family Stand | Atlantic Records |
| 1990 | "Sweet Liberation" | The Family Stand | Atlantic Records |
| 1992 | "Shades of Blue" | The Family Stand | East West America/Atlantic Records |
| 1997 | "You Don't Have to Worry" | The Family Stand | East West America/Atlantic Records |
| 2010 | "Story" | The Family Stand | Strategic Soul Ventures |
